= List of canals in the United States =

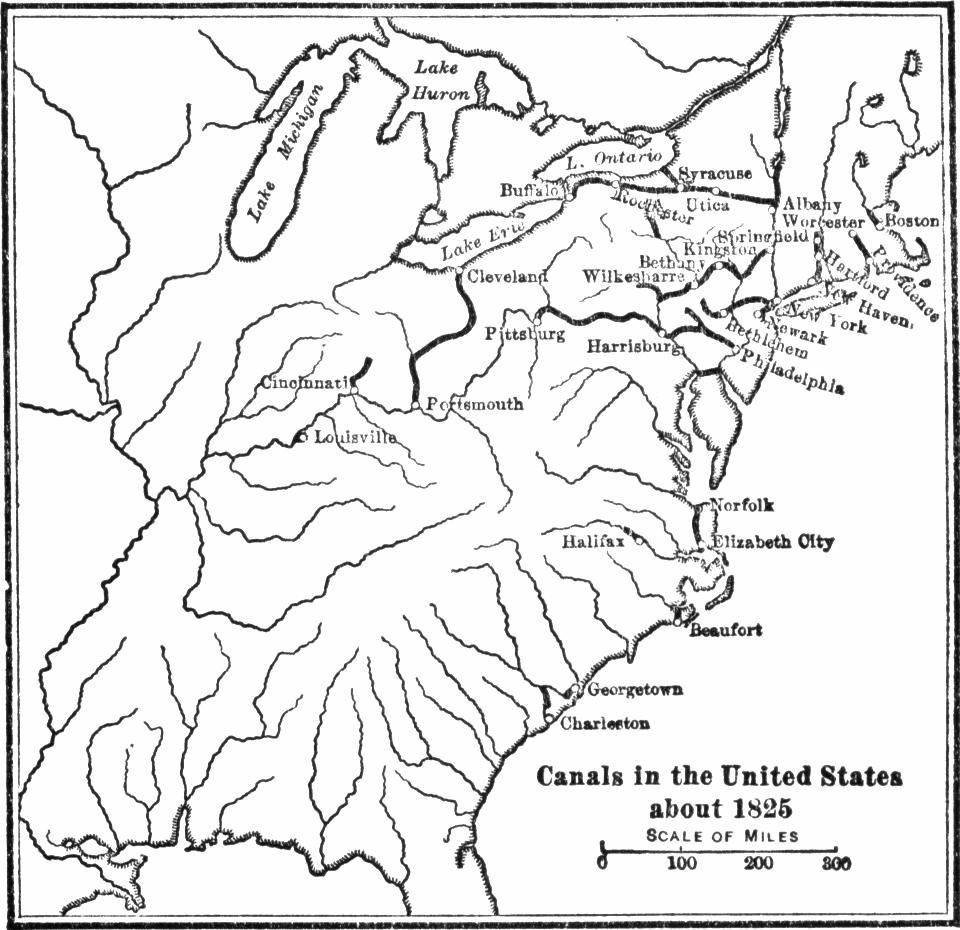
USA canals circa 1825

The following is a list of canals in the United States:

== Transportation canals in operation ==
This list includes active canals and artificial waterways that are maintained for use by boats. Although some abandoned canals and drainage canals have stretches that can be paddled in a small craft, such as a canoe, they are not included in this list.

Name	Place	State	Navigable length	Notes
Albemarle and Chesapeake Canal	Chesapeake	VA	8.5 mi (13.7 km)	Two canals 30 miles (48 km) apart in two states
Albemarle and Chesapeake Canal	Currituck County	NC	5.5 mi (8.9 km)	Two canals 30 miles (48 km) apart in two states
Alligator–Pungo Canal	Hyde County, Tyrell County	NC	22 mi (35 km)	
Assawoman Canal	Sussex County	DE	4 mi (6.4 km)	Part of the Intracoastal Waterway
Atlantic Intracoastal Waterway	East Coast			Part of the Intracoastal Waterway
Augusta Canal	Augusta; Columbia County	GA	6.8 mi (10.9 km)	Not navigable to other waterways
Bricktown Canal	Bricktown	OK	1 mi (1.6 km)	Has water taxi service. Not navigable to other waterways
Barkley Canal	Lyon County	KY	1.25 mi (2.01 km)	
Cal-Sag Channel	Cook County	IL	16 mi (26 km)	Part of the Illinois Waterway
Calcasieu Ship Channel	Calcasieu Parish, Cameron Parish	LA	36.5 mi (58.7 km)	
Canaveral Barge Canal	Merritt Island	FL	6 mi (9.7 km)	
Cape Cod Canal	Barnstable County	MA	7 mi (11 km)	Part of the Intracoastal Waterway
Cape May Canal	Cape May County	NJ	3.3 mi (5.3 km)	Part of the Intracoastal Waterway
Cayuga–Seneca Canal	Seneca County	NY	20 mi (32 km)	
Chain of Rocks Canal	Madison County	IL	9 mi (14 km)	The most downstream lock on the Upper Mississippi River
Champlain Canal	Upstate New York	NY	60 mi (97 km)	
Chesapeake & Delaware Canal	Cecil County	MD	14 mi (23 km)	Part of the Intracoastal Waterway
Chesapeake & Delaware Canal	New Castle County	DE	14 mi (23 km)	Part of the Intracoastal Waterway
Chicago Sanitary and Ship Canal	Cook County, Will County	IL	28 mi (45 km)	Part of the Illinois Waterway
Clam Lake Canal	Cadillac	MI	0.33 mi (0.53 km)	
Corpus Christi Ship Channel	Corpus Christi	TX		
Cumberland and Oxford Canal	Naples	ME	0.04 mi (0.064 km)	Only the Songo Lock is still in use
Delcambre Canal	Iberia Parish	LA	12 mi (19 km)	
Dismal Swamp Canal	Chesapeake	VA	22 mi (35 km)	Part of the Intracoastal Waterway
Dismal Swamp Canal	Camden County	NC	22 mi (35 km)	Part of the Intracoastal Waterway
Duluth Ship Canal	Duluth	MN	0.33 mi (0.53 km)	
Erie Canal	Upstate New York	NY	363 mi (584 km)	
Galveston and Brazos Canal	Brazoria County	TX		
Gowanus Canal	Brooklyn	NY	1.8 mi (2.9 km)	
Great Lakes Waterway	Great Lakes region			Has many branches. Reaches into Canada
Gulf Intracoastal Waterway	Gulf Coast		1,050 mi (1,690 km)	Part of the Intracoastal Waterway
Harlem River Ship Canal	New York	NY	8 mi (13 km)	Now indistinguishable from the Harlem River
Haulover Canal	Brevard County	FL	1.25 mi (2.01 km)	Part of the Intracoastal Waterway
Houston Ship Channel	Houston	TX	50 mi (80 km)	
Illinois Waterway	Northern and Central Illinois	IL	336 mi (541 km)	
Indiana Harbor and Ship Canal	East Chicago	IN	6.75 mi (10.86 km)	Has two branches
Industrial Canal (Inner Harbor Navigation Canal)	New Orleans	LA	5.5 mi (8.9 km)	
Intracoastal Waterway			3,000 mi (4,800 km)	Consists of many canals and natural waterbodies
Keweenaw Waterway	Houghton County	MI	24.5 mi (39.4 km)	
Lake Washington Ship Canal	Seattle	WA	8 mi (13 km)	
Lauritzen Canal	Richmond	CA	0.32 mi (0.51 km)	
Lechmere Canal	East Cambridge	MA	0.2 mi (0.32 km)	
Lewes and Rehoboth Canal	Sussex County	DE	9 mi (14 km)	Part of the Intracoastal Waterway
Louisville and Portland Canal	Louisville	KY	2 mi (3.2 km)	
Matagorda Ship Channel	Matagorda County	TX	2 mi (3.2 km)	
McClellan–Kerr Arkansas River Navigation System		AR	445 mi (716 km)	
McClellan–Kerr Arkansas River Navigation System	Eastern Oklahoma	OK	445 mi (716 km)	
New Jersey Intracoastal Waterway	Monmouth to Cape May counties	NJ	117.7 mi (189.4 km)	Part of the Intracoastal Waterway; includes the Point Pleasant Canal and Cape May Canal
Ogden Slip	Chicago	IL	0.35 mi (0.56 km)	
Okeechobee Waterway	South Florida	FL	154 mi (248 km)	
Oswego Canal	Oswego County	NY	23.7 mi (38.1 km)	
Point Pleasant Canal	Point Pleasant	NJ	2 mi (3.2 km)	Part of the Intracoastal Waterway
Port Townsend Ship Canal	Jefferson County	WA	0.9 mi (1.4 km)	
Portage Lake Canal	Houghton County	MI	2.5 mi (4.0 km)	Part of Keweenaw Waterway
Sabine–Neches Waterway	Southeast Texas	TX	64 mi (103 km)	
Sabine–Neches Waterway	Calcasieu Parish	LA	64 mi (103 km)	
Sacramento Deep Water Ship Channel	Solano County, Yolo County	CA	43 mi (69 km)	
Smith Canal	Stockton	CA	2.4 mi (3.9 km)	
St. Clair Flats Canal	Clay Township	MI		
St. Lawrence Seaway	Jefferson County, St. Lawrence County	NY	370 mi (600 km)	Spans into Canada
St. Lucie Canal (C-44)	Martin County	FL	26 mi (42 km)	Part of the Okeechobee Waterway
Stockton Channel	Stockton	CA	2.5 mi (4.0 km)	
Stockton Deepwater Shipping Channel	San Joaquin County, Contra Costa County	CA	41 mi (66 km)	
Shinnecock Canal	Hampton Bays	NY	0.9 mi (1.4 km)	
St. Marys Falls Canal (Soo Locks)	Sault Ste. Marie	MI	2 mi (3.2 km)	Part of the Great Lakes Waterway
Sturgeon Bay Ship Canal	Door County	WI	1.3 mi (2.1 km)	
Tennessee–Tombigbee Waterway	Northeast Mississippi	MS	234 mi (377 km)	
Tennessee–Tombigbee Waterway	Southwest Alabama	AL	234 mi (377 km)	
Victoria Barge Canal	Victoria County, Calhoun County	TX	35 mi (56 km)	
West Neebish Channel	Chippewa County	MI	6 mi (9.7 km)	Part of the Great Lakes Waterway
Wiley-Dondero Canal	St. Lawrence County	NY	9.2 mi (14.8 km)	Part of the St. Lawrence Seaway

The United States also built the Panama Canal on territory it controlled.

== Abandoned transportation canals ==
Name	State	Opened	Closed	Length	Notes
Alexandria Canal	VA	1843	1886	7 mi (11 km)	
Bald Eagle and Spring Creek Navigation	PA	1837	1865		
Baillie-Grohman Canal	WA	1889	1902?	5,049 ft (1,539 m)	
Bank's Canal	VA				
Beardstown and Sangamon Canal	IL				
Beaver and Erie Canal	PA	1844	1872	136 mi (219 km)	Part of the Pennsylvania Canal
Bellows Falls Canal	VT	1802	1858		
Black River Canal	NY	1855	1925	35 mi (56 km)	
Blackstone Canal	RI	1828	1848	45 mi (72 km)	
Blackstone Canal	MA	1828	1848	45 mi (72 km)	
Brunswick–Altamaha Canal	GA	1854	1860	12 mi (19 km)	
Cascade Locks and Canal	OR	1896	1938		
Cascade Locks and Canal	WA	1896	1938		
Celilo Canal	OR	1915	1957		
Celilo Canal	WA	1915	1957		
Chemung Canal	NY	1833	1878		
Chenango Canal	NY	1836	1878	97 mi (156 km)	
Chesapeake and Ohio Canal	MD	1830	1924	184.5 mi (296.9 km)	
Chesapeake and Ohio Canal	DC	1830	1924	184.5 mi (296.9 km)	
Clinton–Kalamazoo Canal	MI	1843		13 mi (21 km)	Partially completed
Codorus Navigation	PA	1832	1850	11 mi (18 km)	
Colbert Shoals Canal	AL				Flooded by Pickwick Lake
Columbia Canal	SC	1824			Now used for hydroelectic power
Conestoga Navigation	PA	1826		18 mi (29 km)	
Conewago Canal	PA	1797		1 mi (1.6 km)	
Cross Florida Barge Canal	FL			30 mi (48 km)	Partially completed
Culpeper Gold Mine Canal	VA				
Cumberland and Oxford Canal	ME	1832	1873	38 mi (61 km)	Songo Lock remains open
Deep Run Canal	VA				
Delaware and Hudson Canal	PA	1828	1917	108 mi (174 km)	
Delaware and Hudson Canal	NY	1828	1917	108 mi (174 km)	
Delaware and Raritan Canal	NJ	1834	1932	66 mi (106 km)	
Delaware Canal	PA	1832	1931	60 mi (97 km)	Part of the Pennsylvania Canal
Des Moines Rapids Canal	IA				
Enfield Falls Canal	CT	1829		5.25 mi (8.45 km)	
Farmington Canal (New Haven and Northampton Canal)	CT	1828	1847	56 mi (90 km)	Continued into Massachusetts as the Hampshire and Hampden Canal
Ficklin's Canal	VA				
Fox–Wisconsin Waterway	WI				Partially restored
Franklin Line	PA	1833	1837	22 mi (35 km)	Part of the Pennsylvania Canal
Fredericksburg Canal	VA				
Genesee Valley Canal	NY	1840	1878	124 mi (200 km)	
Hampshire and Hampden Canal	MA		1847	30 mi (48 km)	Continued into Connecticut as the Farmington Canal
Hennepin Canal	IL	1907		75.2 mi (121.0 km)	
Hocking Canal	OH	1841	1890	56 mi (90 km)	
Illinois and Michigan Canal	IL	1848	1933	96 mi (154 km)	
Indiana Central Canal	IN			8 mi (13 km)	Partially completed
James River and Kanawha Canal	VA				Only Virginia portion completed
Junction Canal	PA	1854	1871	18 mi (29 km)	
Junction Canal	NY	1854	1871	18 mi (29 km)	
Landsford Canal	SC	1823		2 mi (3.2 km)	
Lehigh Canal	PA	1821	1942	72 mi (116 km)	A mule-drawn tourist barge operates at the National Canal Museum
Leiper Canal	PA	1829	1852	3 mi (4.8 km)	
Love Canal	NY				
Main Line of Public Works	PA				
Miami Canal	FL				
Miami and Erie Canal	OH	1844	1913	274 mi (441 km)	
Middlesex Canal	MA	1803	1851	27 mi (43 km)	
Milan Canal	OH	1839	1868		
Mississippi River–Gulf Outlet Canal	LA	1968	2009	76 mi (122 km)	
Morris Canal	NJ	1829	1924	107 mi (172 km)	
Muscle Shoals Canal	AL				Drowned under Wilson Lake?
Ohio and Erie Canal	OH	1827	1913	308 mi (496 km)	
Patowmack Canal (Potomac Canal)	MD	1795	1828		Consists of the Little Falls Canal, Great Falls Canal, Seneca Falls Canal, Payne's Falls Canal, and House Falls Canal
Patowmack Canal (Potomac Canal)	VA	1795	1828		Consists of the Little Falls Canal, Great Falls Canal, Seneca Falls Canal, Payne's Falls Canal, and House Falls Canal
Pawtucket Canal	MA	1796			
Pennsylvania Canal	PA				
Pennsylvania and Ohio Canal	PA	1840	1877	82 mi (132 km)	
Pennsylvania and Ohio Canal	OH	1840	1877	82 mi (132 km)	
Portage Canal	WI	1876	1951	2 mi (3.2 km)	
Powell's Canal	VA				
Rapidan Dam Canal of the Rappahannock Navigation	VA				
Sandy and Beaver Canal	PA	1848	1852	73 mi (117 km)	
Sandy and Beaver Canal	OH	1848	1852	73 mi (117 km)	
Santee Canal	SC	1800	1865	22 mi (35 km)	
Savannah Ogeechee Canal	GA				
Schuylkill Navigation	PA	1825	1931	108 mi (174 km)	
Schuylkill and Susquehanna Navigation Company	PA				
Delaware and Schuylkill Navigation Company	PA				
Skinker's Canal	VA				
Snake Castle Canal	VA				
South Hadley Canal	MA	1795			
Spring Valley Canal	VA				
Susquehanna Canal	MD	1802	1840	9 mi (14 km)	
Susquehanna and Tidewater Canal	PA	1840	1894	43 mi (69 km)	
Susquehanna and Tidewater Canal	MD	1840	1894	43 mi (69 km)	
Suwannee Canal	GA				
Taylor's Canal	VA				
Union Canal	PA	1828	1885	82 mi (132 km)	
Wabash and Erie Canal	OH	1843	1874	460 mi (740 km)	
Wabash and Erie Canal	IN	1843	1874	460 mi (740 km)	
Walhonding Canal	OH	1842	1896	25 mi (40 km)	
Warren County Canal	OH	1840	1848	20 mi (32 km)	
Washington City Canal	DC	1815			
Wheatley's Canal	VA				
Whitewater Canal	IN	1839		76 mi (122 km)	
Wiconisco Canal	PA	1845	1889	12 mi (19 km)	

== Irrigation, industrial, and drainage canals ==
=== Alaska ===
- Davidson Ditch

=== Arizona ===
- Central Arizona Project
- Salt River Project Canals
  - Arizona Canal
- Yuma Project Canals

=== California ===
- All-American Canal
- Back Channel
- Beardsley Canal
- Buena Vista Canal
- California Aqueduct
- Calloway Canal
- Carrier Canal
- Coachella Canal
- Colorado River Aqueduct
- Contra Costa Canal
- Corning Canal
- Delta–Mendota Canal
- Eastside Canal
- Folsom South Canal
- Friant-Kern Canal
- Glenn Colusa Canal
- Inter-California Canal
- Kern Island Canal
- Los Angeles Aqueduct
- Madera Canal
- Orland South Canal
- Orland North Canal
- Pioneer Canal
- Putah South Canal
- Stine Canal
- Tehama Colusa Canal

=== Florida ===
- Hillsboro Canal
- Miami Canal
- North New River Canal
- Tamiami Canal
- West Palm Beach Canal

=== Hawaii ===
- Ala Wai Canal, Honolulu
- Waiolama Canal, Hilo

=== Idaho ===
- New York Canal

=== Illinois ===
- North Shore Channel (popular for canoeing and kayaking)

=== Louisiana ===
- 17th Street Canal
- Carondelet Canal
- Florida Canal
- London Avenue Canal
- New Orleans Outfall Canals
- Orleans Canal
- Washington-Palmetto Canal

=== Massachusetts ===
- Holyoke Canal System
- Lowell Power Canal System

=== Michigan ===
- Edison Sault Power Canal

=== Montana ===
- Billings Bench Water Association Canal
- Huntley Project

=== Nebraska ===
- Loup Canal

=== New Jersey ===
- Cape May Canal
- Delaware and Raritan Canal
- Dundee Canal
- Morris Canal
- Point Pleasant Canal
- Raritan Water Power Canal
- Washington Canal

=== Texas ===
- American Canal
- Franklin Canal
- Riverside Canal (El Paso)
- Texas Irrigation Canals

=== Washington ===
- Banks Lake Feeder Canal
- Centralia Canal
- Tieton Main Canal
- Yelm Ditch (defunct)

== Natural inlets called canals ==
Behm Canal, Duncan Canal, Lynn Canal, and Portland Canal in Alaska, and Hood Canal in Washington are natural inlets that use the name canal.

== Canals by state ==
These are man made canals in each state that have been given a name and may consist of a narrow irrigation or drainage ditch to a large ship, municipal water and/or irrigation canal. States with extensive agricultural acreage may have many hundred to thousands of canals. USGS Topographical map numbers and latitudes and longitudes of each canal, usable as inputs into Google, Bing, etc. maps, are usually given.

Canals in each state
State	Number of canals	Ref.	State	Number of canals	Ref.
Alabama	21		Montana	858
Alaska	23		Nebraska	209
Arizona	289		Nevada	263
Arkansas	6		New Hampshire	10
California	2,903		New Jersey	41
Colorado	1,888		New Mexico	69
Connecticut	8		New York	116
Delaware	54		North Carolina	151
Florida	245		North Dakota	69
Georgia	25		Ohio	22
Hawaii	125		Oklahoma	9
Idaho	1,540		Oregon	661
Illinois	278		Pennsylvania	11
Indiana	2,239		Rhode Island	3
Iowa	299		South Carolina	33
Kansas	27		South Dakota	91
Kentucky	62		Tennessee	61
Louisiana	45		Texas	299
Maine	7		Utah	575
Maryland	44		Vermont	1
Massachusetts	26		Virginia	59
Michigan	1,668		Washington	237
Minnesota	1,451		West Virginia	2
Mississippi	185		Wisconsin	89
Missouri	287		Wyoming	1085
Total canals	18,241

== See also ==
- List of canals
- Sheep Creek
