= Beardsley Canal =

Canal in California, United States

Coordinates: 35°24′56″N 119°03′22″W

Beardsley Canal is an irrigation canal in Kern County, California. It originates at the Kern River, east of Gordon's Ferry and just west of the First Point of Measurement. It is the first diversion from the river in the San Joaquin Valley for agriculture irrigation (Hart Park has two canals, but are used exclusively for aesthetics and reconnect to the river). It terminates at reservoirs located in Famoso, just east of SR 99 (Golden State Freeway).

From the diversion, the canal follows the course of the Kern River, until reaching the common diversion (used by the Carrier, Kern Island, and Eastside Canals). From there, it runs roughly west, through Oildale. After crossing Roberts Lane, the canal turns northwest, and crosses SR 99. It continues northwest, as it leaves urban development. It then crosses SR 99 again, now traveling on the east side of the freeway. At this point, it is running roughly parallel to the Friant-Kern Canal and the Calloway Canal, which are farther west. The canal continues northwest, until terminating at reservoirs in Famoso.
