= Susquehanna and Tidewater Canal =

Canal in Pennsylvania and Maryland

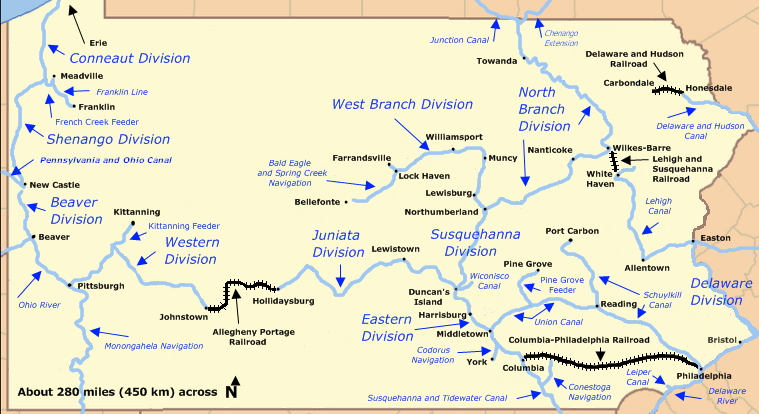
- Map of historic Pennsylvania canals and connecting railroads
- Interactive map of Susquehanna and Tidewater Canal

Specifications
- Locks: 29
- Status: Abandoned except for recreation and historic interest

History
- Original owner: Susquehanna Canal Company and Tidewater Canal Company
- Construction began: 1836
- Date completed: 1840
- Date closed: 1894

Geography
- Start point: Wrightsville, Pennsylvania
- End point: Havre de Grace, Maryland
- Branches: Conestoga Navigation, Codorus Navigation
- Connects to: Eastern Division Canal, Chesapeake Bay

The Susquehanna and Tidewater Canal between Wrightsville, Pennsylvania, and Havre de Grace, Maryland, at the head of the Chesapeake Bay, provided an interstate shipping alternative to 19th-century arks, rafts, and boats plying the difficult waters of the lower Susquehanna River. Built between 1836 and 1840, it ran 43 miles (69 km) along the west bank of the river and rendered obsolete an older, shorter canal along the east bank. Of its total length, 30 miles (48 km) were in Pennsylvania and 13 miles (21 km) in Maryland. Although rivalry between Philadelphia, Pennsylvania, and Baltimore, Maryland, delayed its construction, the finished canal brought increased shipments of coal and other raw materials to both cities from Pennsylvania's interior. Competition from railroads was a large factor in the canal's decline after 1855. Canal remnants, including a lock keeper's house, have been preserved in Maryland, and locks 12 and 15 have been preserved in Pennsylvania.

A copy of a detailed survey blueprint of the entire canal system including structures and property ownership details was donated (date unknown) by the Safe Harbor Water Power Corporation to Millersville University (assessed on 10/06/2016 in the MU Archives at Sp. Coll. Map 386.409748 S128 Folio). The survey consists of 67 pages, 98 x 30 cm. and is undated but the assumption is the original was created while the canal was in use. The assumed final page (68) which would be a survey of the final lock in Havre de Grace, MD is missing. An original copy (undated) of the survey is located in the Archives of Safe Harbor Dam as of 2022 (Brookfield Renewable). That document is also missing the final page 68.

The survey was completed in 1875 after the January 1, 1872 lease of the Canal to the Reading Railroad. Support for a date of the survey having been completed in 1875 include the fact that the John Bair Warehouse (now Tucquan Club) completed in 1879 (date stone in surviving building) was not on the survey (see map page 23). However, the York Furnace Bridge ruins are indicated. The bridge was destroyed in 1856. This suggests a date between 1856 and 1879.

The confirmation comes from the biography of William H. Dechant of Reading. See Reading and Berks County, Pennsylvania: A History, Volume 3, page 198, Lewis Historical Pub. Co., New York, 1925, by Cyrus T. Fox. Therein it specifically confirms that Mr Dechant, a young surveyor for Reading Railroad, completed the survey in 1875 from Columbia, PA to Havre de Grace, MD. Also see, The_Aegis_and_Intelligencer_Fri__Jul_30__1875, page where it states Mr Dechant finished a complete map of the canal to Havre de Grace in 1875.

== History ==
=== Competition ===
In the 1820s, seeking raw materials from and trade with Pennsylvania's interior counties, residents of the large port city of Baltimore favored building a canal along the lower Susquehanna linking the Chesapeake Bay to Pennsylvania's Main Line of Public Works at Columbia, Pennsylvania, across the river from Wrightsville. Residents of the rival port city of Philadelphia, fearing loss of trade to Baltimore, argued against the proposal. In 1829, completion of the Chesapeake and Delaware Canal across an isthmus south of Philadelphia, resolved the impasse by shortening the water link between Havre de Grace and Philadelphia to 74 miles (119 km). Since this was only 20 miles (32 km) further by water than from Havre de Grace to Baltimore, the Susquehanna and Tidewater Canal stood to benefit both cities. In 1835, the Susquehanna Canal Company of Pennsylvania joined the Tidewater Canal Company of Maryland in privately funding and building the canal. Construction began in 1836 and was finished in 1840.

=== Debt ===
Despite toll collections rising from $42,000 in its first year to about four times that amount by 1850, the canal company faced money problems. Construction costs had totaled $3.5 million; with only $1.25 million in start-up capital, the company had borrowed heavily, and it struggled to pay its debts. After 1855, toll revenue fell; flood damage, railroad competition, and the disruptions of the Civil War hastened the decline. In 1872, the company sold its assets to the Philadelphia and Reading Railway Company, which used the canal to haul coal to Baltimore until 1894, during the Reading's first receivership (caused by the Panic of 1893). The Pennsylvania Railroad opened the Columbia and Port Deposit Railroad across the river in 1877.

=== Infrastructure, cargo ===
The canal had 29 locks overcoming 231 feet (70 m) of elevation. At Wrightsville and the Columbia–Wrightsville canal basin, it connected with the Pennsylvania Canal's Eastern Division, part of the Main Line of Public Works. Cargo included coal, lumber, grain, and iron, much of it bound for Baltimore or Philadelphia. Boats passed through a weigh lock at York Furnace, where tolls were paid. Teams of mules walked on towpaths beside the canal and pulled the boats. At the upper terminus, across the river from Columbia, a wooden bridge with a two-tier tow path allowed mules going in opposite directions to cross the Susquehanna River simultaneously without colliding. From the canal outlet at Havre de Grace, tugs pulled the boats to Baltimore or other destinations. Mules on the Baltimore boats waited in Havre de Grace for the return journey, while boats bound for Philadelphia took their mules with them to use on the next towpath canal.

== Earlier canal ==
Long before the opening of the Susquehanna and Tidewater Canal, the Maryland legislature of 1783, hoping to open a reliable trade route along the lower Susquehanna River, had granted a charter to a company of 40 men, mostly from Baltimore, to build a canal called the Susquehanna Canal.James Brindley (1745–1820) was the Chief Engineer for the project until it was suspended in 1786 for lack of funds. The Proprietors of the Susquehanna Canal, as the company was called, succeeded by 1802 in completing a canal of 9 miles (14 km) along the east bank of the river from the Chesapeake Bay to the Pennsylvania state line. The Proprietors hoped the Pennsylvania legislature would allow an extension on the other side of the state line; however, no canal below Columbia, Pennsylvania, was approved by Pennsylvania until after the opening in 1829 of the Chesapeake and Delaware Canal. It cut across the northern isthmus of the Delmarva Peninsula and made a lower Susquehanna canal more appealing to Philadelphia. A combination of high costs, faulty construction, and low revenues led the Proprietors to sell the Susquehanna Canal at a loss in 1817, and it was abandoned entirely in 1840 when the Susquehanna and Tidewater Canal opened on the opposite side of the river. The Susquehanna Canal was also known as the Port Deposit Canal or the Conowingo Canal, not to be confused with the Conewago Canal upstream near York Haven.

== Remnants ==
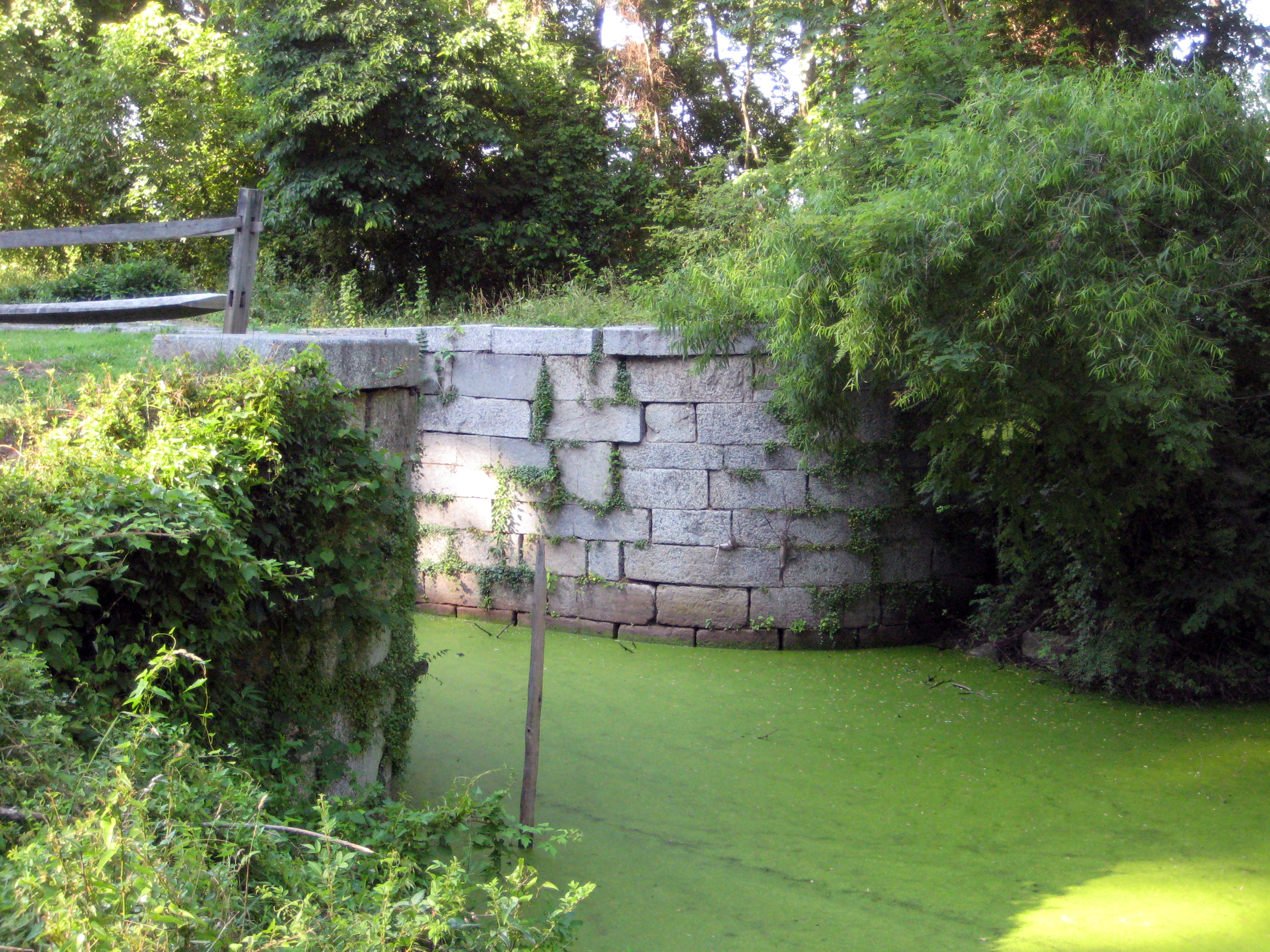
Southern end of a lock at the abandoned town of Lapidum, Maryland

Remnants of the canal can be seen at Susquehanna State Park in Harford County, Maryland, 3 miles (4.8 km) northwest of Havre de Grace as part of the Southern Terminal, Susquehanna and Tidewater Canal historic district listed on the National Register of Historic Places. The Susquehanna Museum in Havre de Grace has restored the lock house and other infrastructure at the southern terminus of the canal. On the Pennsylvania side, Lock #12 has been preserved by PPL along Pennsylvania Route 372 at the south end of the Norman Wood Bridge across the Susquehanna River. A footpath along the river leading from Lock 12 <39.813674, -76.328744> passes under highway Route 372 to the ruins of Locks 13. Lock 14 no longer exists. Preserved Lock 15 <39° 48.009'N 76° 18.481'W> is accessible by car 1.5 miles south of Lock 12 along River Road where can be found interpretive panels about the canal operation. Lock 11 (removed) was located at the spillway (kayak feature) of the Holtwood Dam.

== Corporate successor ==
As a corporate entity, the corporation known as The Proprietors of the Susquehanna Canal still exists, having been purchased by the Philadelphia Electric Company, and now owned by its successor, Exelon. Its rights as a Maryland corporation, dating to 1783, allowed the construction of the Conowingo Dam.

== Points of interest ==
| Feature | Coordinates | Description |
|---|---|---|
| Columbia | 40°02′01″N 76°30′16″W | Borough at the western terminus of the Philadelphia and Columbia Railroad and the southern terminus of the Eastern Division Canal |
| Peach Bottom | 39°45′03″N 76°13′33″W | Village near the midpoint of the canal |
| Havre de Grace | 39°32′57″N 76°05′30″W | City at the southern terminus |

== See also ==
- List of canals in the United States
