= Beardstown and Sangamon Canal =

The Beardstown and Sangamon Canal was a canal plan developed in the mid-1830s, with avid backing by Abraham Lincoln, then an Illinois state legislator, to make large portions of the Sangamon River between Springfield, Illinois, and Beardstown, Illinois, navigable via a canal to the junction with the Illinois River, which in turn flows into the Mississippi River.

Geographical location and the lack of transportation facilities handicapped the growth of central Illinois. In the 1830s, as pioneers settled there, they realized that there was a need for better transportation facilities to move their crops and goods to markets along the Mississippi River. Much of the land was still vacant, but Springfield and the outlying villages could consume only a small fraction of the produce of the county's farmers, and shipping costs made it uneconomical to send corn and wheat to distant markets.

In the mid-1830s, canals offered the cheapest, most practical means of transportation. The Sangamon River was too shallow in many spots for deeper draft steamers that would be required to carry goods and produce to market. There were several proposals for solving the river's transportation problem with private financing. As a state legislator from the area, Lincoln pushed for incorporation of a company to undertake the canal project.

In 1836, the Illinois Legislature chartered the Beardstown and Springfield Canal Company, capitalized at $200,000 and authorized to dig a canal part of the way and to improve the Sangamon River's channel into Mason County, near Beardstown, at the junction with the deeper Illinois River.

Following the company's successful incorporation, Lincoln remained an avid backer of the project. On February 13, 1836, he addressed a large crowd in Petersburg, Illinois, promoting the Beardstown and Sangamon Canal. At the meeting, the company's charter was read and a plea for subscriptions was made. Two weeks later, Lincoln purchased a share of stock in Beardstown and Sangamon Canal Company, paying $1 down and owing $4. Seventy-eight shares additional share were bought by 65 others local residents.

The incorporators had enthusiastic backing from local residents and newspapers, but the project was abandoned when an engineering survey of the proposed canal route and accompanying river improvements put the cost at $811,082.

== See also ==
- List of canals in the United States
