= Southern Terminal, Susquehanna and Tidewater Canal =

Historic district in Maryland, United States

- U.S. National Register of Historic Places
- U.S. Historic district
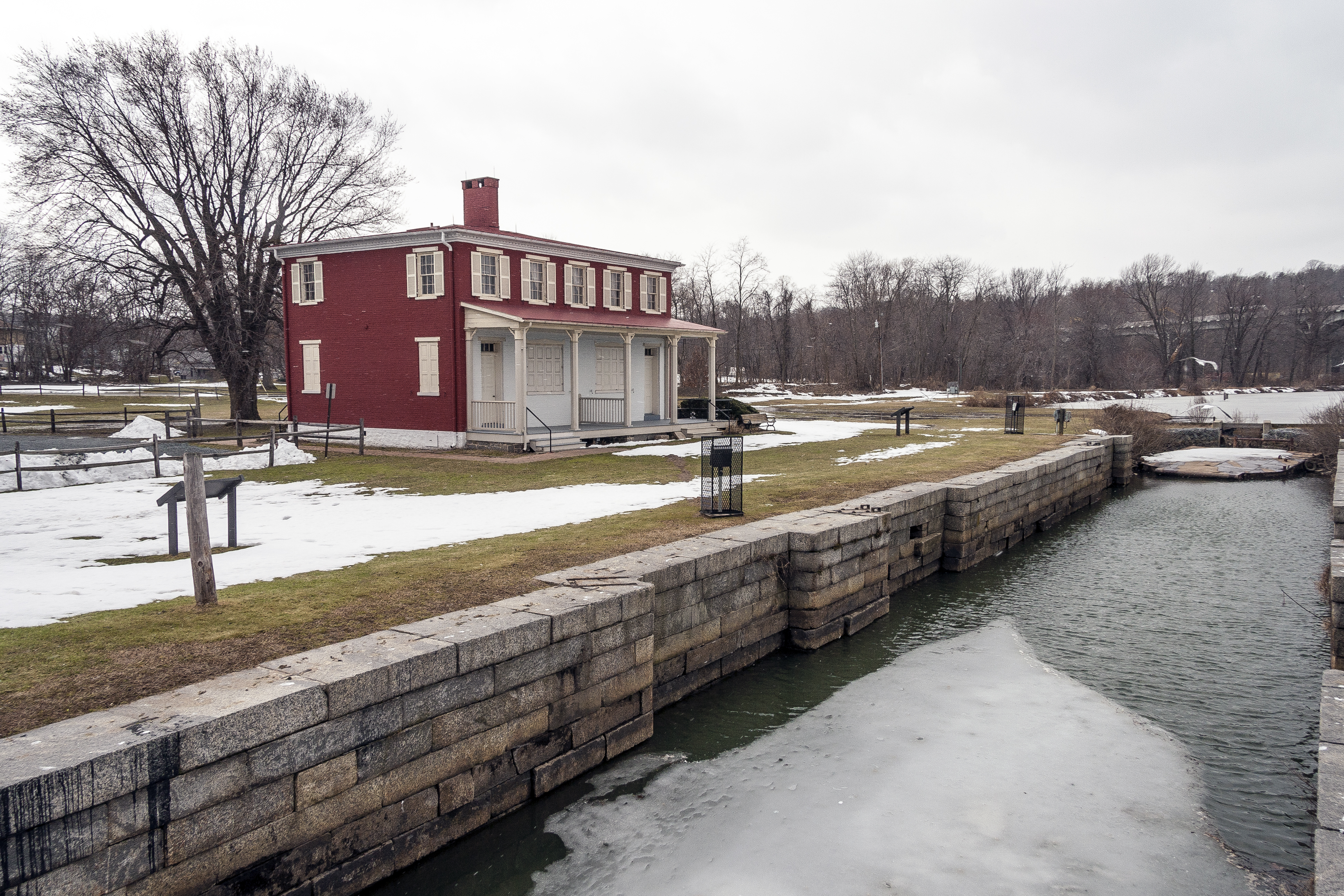
- Susquehanna and Tidewater Canal in 2010

- Location within Maryland Location within the United States
- Location: N of Erie St. between Conesteo St. and the Susquehanna, Havre de Grace, Maryland
- Coordinates: 39°33′24″N 76°5′41″W
- Area: 33 acres (13 ha)
- Built: 1836
- NRHP reference No.: 76001000
- Added to NRHP: May 28, 1976

The Southern Terminal, Susquehanna and Tidewater Canal is a national historic district at Havre de Grace, Harford County, Maryland, United States. Located along the western bank of the Susquehanna River near its mouth at the Chesapeake Bay, it includes the Lock Master's House, the canal's outlet lock, and the foundations of a bulkhead wharf along the river side of the lock. Most of the structures built to serve aspects of the Susquehanna and Tidewater Canal operations are no longer standing, but the locations of warehouses, stables, and several other buildings, including a broom factory, are shown on old city maps.

It was added to the National Register of Historic Places in 1987.
