= Eastside Canal =

Coordinates: 35°18′17″N 118°54′16″W

Eastside Canal is an irrigation canal in Kern County, California. It originates from a common diversion at Manor Street in Bakersfield, which also serves the Carrier Canal and Kern Island Canal. The common diversion originates from the Kern River, about 1 mile (1.6 km) south of Gordon's Ferry. The canal terminates south of Bear Mountain Boulevard (SR 223), just west of Arvin.

From the common diversion, the canal travels south, roughly parallel to the Kern Island Canal. After crossing SR 178 (Crosstown Freeway), it turns southeast. It continues southeast, running through the center of Lake Street. At Williams Street, the canal shifts south following the Union Pacific Railroad's right-of-way. At Canal Street, the canal crosses the railroad tracks, but continues to travel southeast. At Fairfax Road, it turns south. It continues traveling roughly south, until it terminates near Arvin.
