= Miami Canal =

Canal in Florida, United States

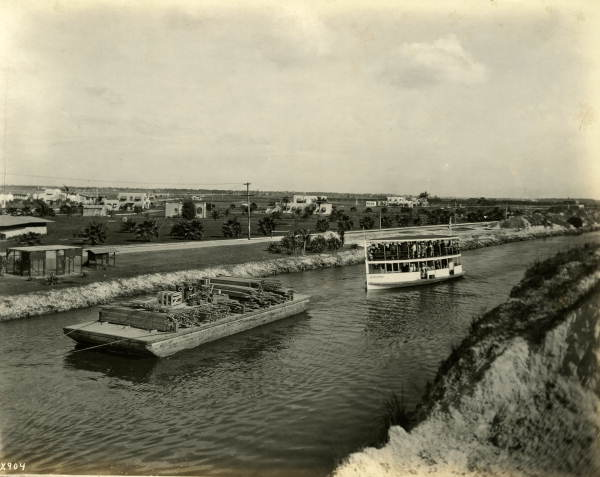
- Passenger launch "Biscayne" approaching barge in Hialeah, Florida
- Interactive map of Miami Canal
- Location: Broward, Palm Beach, Miami-Dade
- Country: United States
- Coordinates: 26°7′47.31″N 80°37′17.21″W

Specifications
- Length: 77 miles (124 km)
- Status: Open

Geography
- Start point: Lake Okeechobee
- End point: Biscayne Bay
- Beginning coordinates: 26°39′35.24″N 80°49′21.22″W
- Ending coordinates: 25°47′56.35″N 80°14′59.18″W

The Miami Canal, or C-6 Canal, flows from Lake Okeechobee in the U.S. state of Florida to its terminus at the Miami River, which flows through downtown Miami. The canal flows in a south and southeasterly direction for approximately 77 miles, and passes through three counties: Broward, Palm Beach, and Miami-Dade.

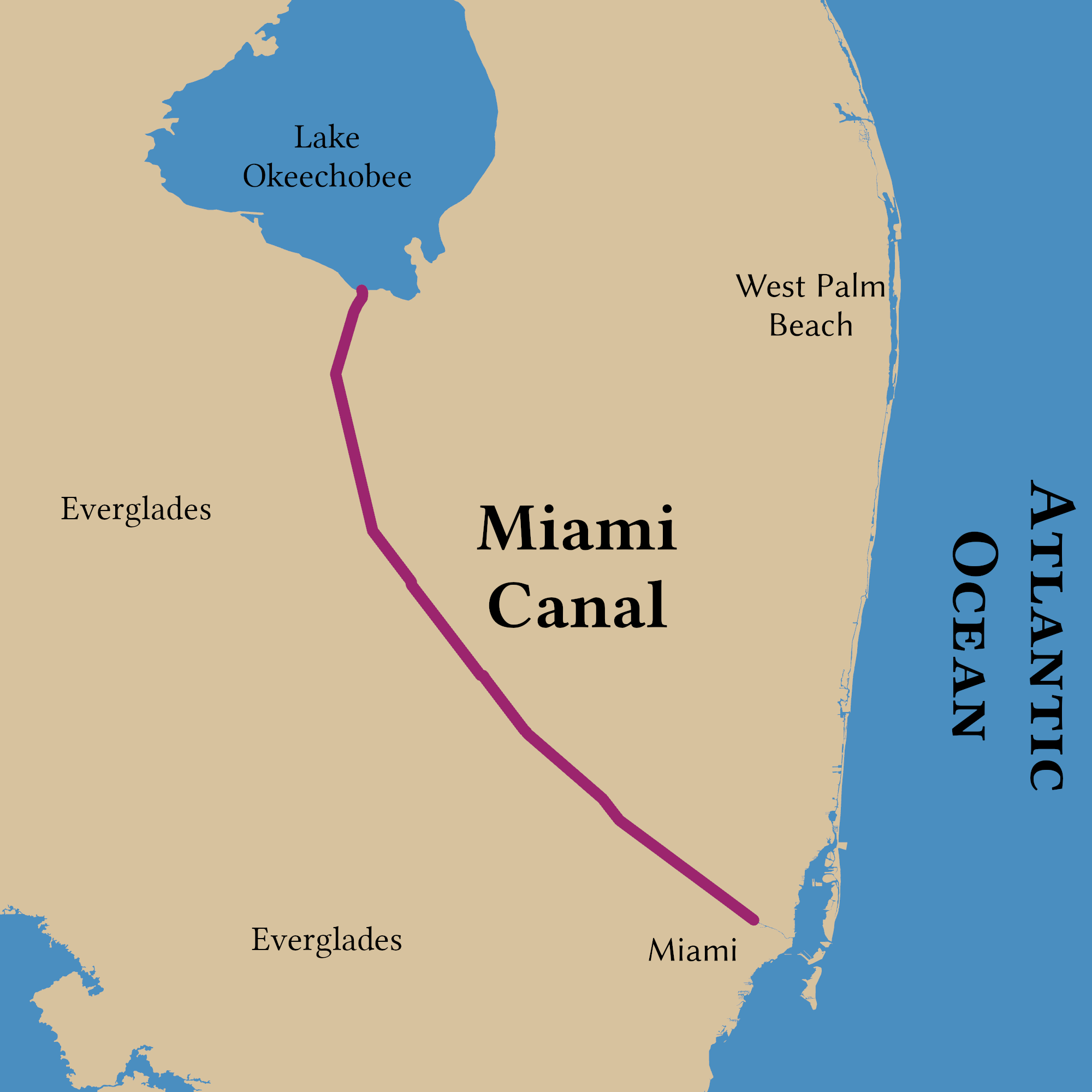
Course of the canal

It was constructed in the early part of the 20th century to drain the Everglades Agricultural Area (EAA). Removing the canal was proposed as part of the Restoration of the Everglades.

== See also ==
- Tamiami Canal
