= Pioneer Canal =

Irrigation Canal in California, United States

Coordinates: 35°21′06″N 119°11′27″W

Pioneer Canal is an irrigation canal in Kern County, California, United States. It originates from the Kern River just east of the Stockdale Highway bridge. It terminates at reservoirs just east of Interstate 5 (Westside Freeway).

From the diversion, the canal travels northwest to the Westside Parkway. It then travels west, past the Allen Road interchange and water recharge basins. While the Westside Parkway shifts south, the canal continues to travel roughly west, although it is gradually shifting north. It travels through additional recharge ponds at Enos Lane (SR 43). It continues west until it terminates at reservoirs just east of Interstate 5 and south of Rosedale Highway (SR 58).
