= Buena Vista Canal =

Canal in California, United States

Coordinates: 35°16′02″N 119°09′46″W

Buena Vista Canal is an irrigation canal in Kern County, California. It originates from the Carrier Canal at Coffee Road. The canal terminates at Lake Webb (and Buena Vista Lakebed) and the Kern River.

From the diversion, the canal travels southwest (although it is routed around California State University, Bakersfield). Just east of Enos Lane (SR 43), part of the canal joins with the Kern River. A second branch travels south to Lake Evans (Buena Vista Lakebed), where it terminates.
