= Codorus Navigation =

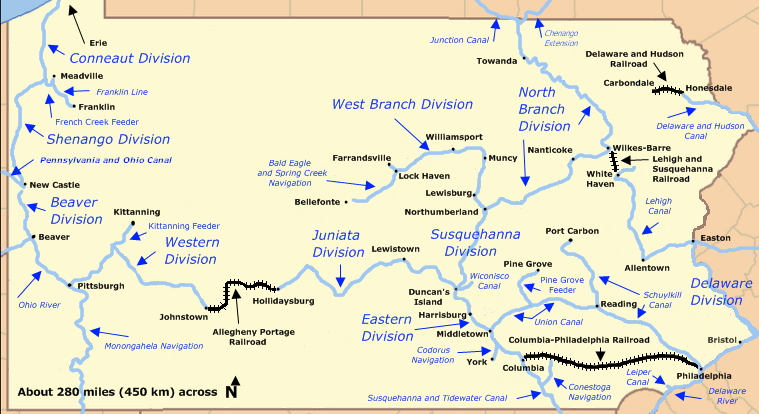
- Map of historic Pennsylvania canals and connecting railroads

Specifications
- Locks: 13
- Status: Abandoned except for recreation and historic interest

History
- Original owner: Codorus Navigation Company
- Date of first use: 1832
- Date completed: 1833
- Date closed: ~1850

Geography
- Start point: York
- End point: Susquehanna River at the mouth of Codorus Creek
- Connects to: Susquehanna River

The Codorus Navigation Company, based in York in south-central Pennsylvania, was formed in 1829 to make a navigable waterway along Codorus Creek from York, Pennsylvania, to the Susquehanna River, a distance of 11 miles (18 km). Plans called for 3 miles (4.8 km) of canal, 8 miles (12.9 km) of slack-water pools, 10 dams, and 13 locks with an average lift of about 7 feet (2.1 m).

The first 3 miles (4.8 km) of the system were finished in 1832, allowing boats named Codorus and Pioneer to run passenger excursions between York and Barnitz's Springs. After the entire system was opened to boats, arks, and rafts in 1833, the first ark to reach York carried 40,000 feet (12,192 m) of lumber and 100 passengers, and later arrivals brought such cargo as stone, coal, and shingles.

Plans originally included a second canal from the mouth of Codorus Creek along the Susquehanna to calm water above Chestnut Ripples. This would have made entrance into the Codorus system easier for craft coming down the river, but the extension canal, though started, was never finished. Competition from the York and Maryland Railroad, which connected York to Baltimore by 1838, and the Wrightsville, York and Gettysburg Railroad, which began operations in 1840, put the Codorus canal out of business by about 1850.

Codorus Navigation was one of several privately funded canals such as the Union Canal that operated in Pennsylvania during the same era as the Pennsylvania Canal. Though the canal fell into disuse in the middle of the 19th century, parts of its graded towpath, once used by the mules that pulled the boats, are becoming part of a rail trail along Codorus Creek between York and John Rudy County Park. The trail of 5.5 miles (8.9 km), a northern extension of Heritage Rail Trail County Park, will join 42 miles (68 km) of existing trail that begins in Ashland, Maryland, and ends in York. Construction began on the trail extension in 2006.

== Points of interest ==
Feature	Coordinates	Description
York	39°57′45″N 76°43′40″W	City at the western terminus
Mouth of Codorus Creek	40°03′30″N 76°38′39″W	Creek mouth near the eastern terminus

== See also ==
- List of canals in the United States
