= Lock No. 1, North New River Canal =

- U.S. National Register of Historic Places
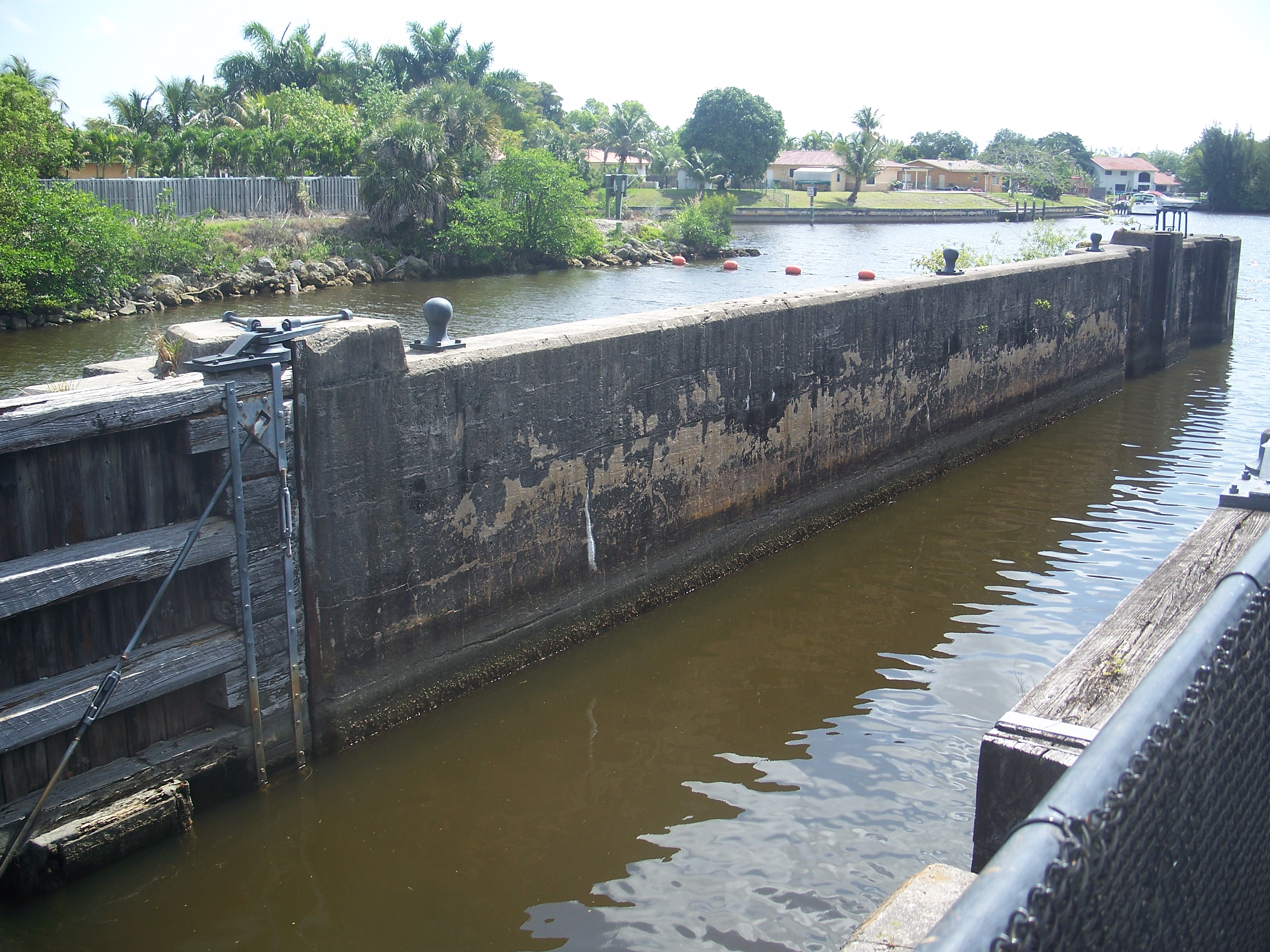
- View of lock looking east and showing wooden gate with rack-and-pinion mechanism

- Location within Florida Location within the United States
- Location: Davie / Plantation, Florida, USA
- Coordinates: 26°5′41″N 80°13′45″W
- NRHP reference No.: 78000932
- Added to NRHP: 17 February 1978

Lock No. 1, North New River Canal (also known as the Sewell Lock or Broward Memorial Lock), which opened in 1912, is a historic lock on the North New River Canal located between Davie and Plantation, Florida, United States. It is located south of Plantation on SR 84. On February 17, 1978, it was added to the U.S. National Register of Historic Places.

The lock is on the south bank of the North New River Canal about 54 miles (87 km) southeast of the origin of the canal at Lake Okeechobee. Lock No. 1 was the first lock constructed in the South Florida canal system built by Napoleon B. Broward. It was designed by world renowned engineers Major S. Sewell and Ben Johnson and built by the Furst-Clark Construction Company. The lock consisted of six-foot-thick concrete walls and large wooden gates that were operated by a hand-driven rack-and-pinion mechanism.

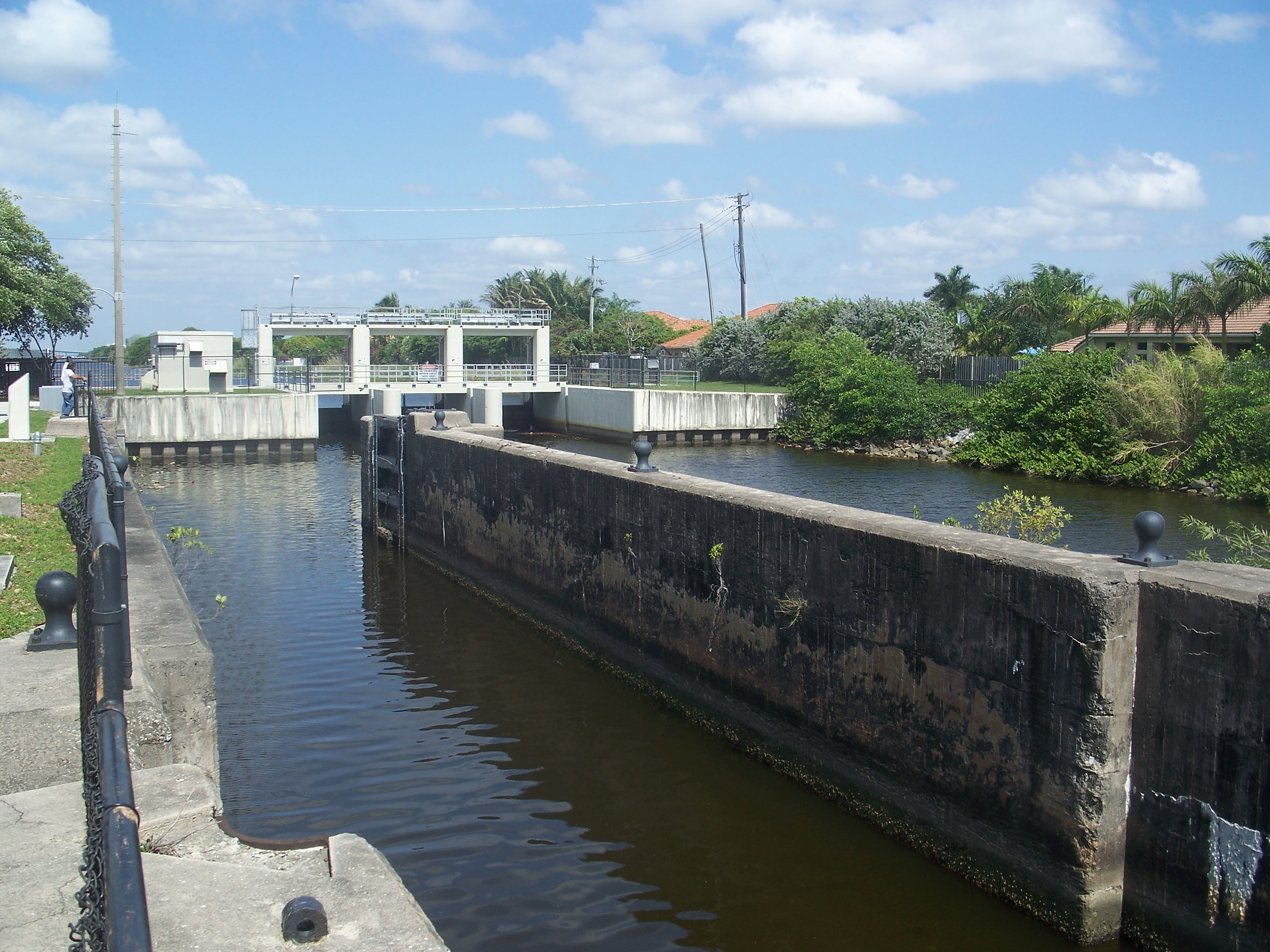
View of lock looking west and showing modern water control structure in background

Part of the Everglades Drainage District, the lock played a vital role in early operations of the New River Canal, a major transportation artery connecting Fort Lauderdale, the Everglades, and Lake Okeechobee. Using the canal and lock, boats brought lumber, farm equipment and people to communities such as Okeelanta and South Bay in the state's interior section south of Lake Okeechobee. The boats then ferried produce from the communities' farms back to the coast, where the goods were shipped north by rail.

Due to shoaling in the canal and the construction of roads and rail links, the lock was closed to boat traffic in 1926. After the lock was listed in the National Register of Historic Places in 1978, local historical groups militated for the construction of a park surrounding the lock. In 1992, the South Florida Water Management District removed a flood control spillway running perpendicular to the old lock structure, and built a modern concrete water control structure just west of the lock. At the same time, various governmental and county groups worked together to restore the lock, which is now the centerpiece of Broward Memorial Lock Park.
