= Stine Canal =

Irrigation canal in Kern County, California

Coordinates: 35°17′29″N 119°05′45″W

Stine Canal is an irrigation canal in Kern County, California. It originates from the Carrier Canal adjacent to SR 99 (Golden State Freeway). It terminates at a reservoir on Bear Mountain Boulevard (SR 223), just east of Gosford Road.

From the diversion, the canal travels south, following North Stine Road. After passing Stockdale Highway, North Stine Road becomes Stine Road. Around Ming Avenue, both the road and the canal turns southwest. Just south of Planz Avenue, Farmers Canal branches from Stine Canal, traveling west. Stine canal continues south, roughly parallel to Stine Road. At Taft Highway (SR 119), the canal shifts west, and runs parallel to Ashe Road. It continues traveling south, but continues to shift west. It eventually terminates at a reservoir on Bear Mountain Boulevard, just east of Gosford Road.
