= Orleans Canal =

Coordinates: 30°00′37″N 90°05′58″W

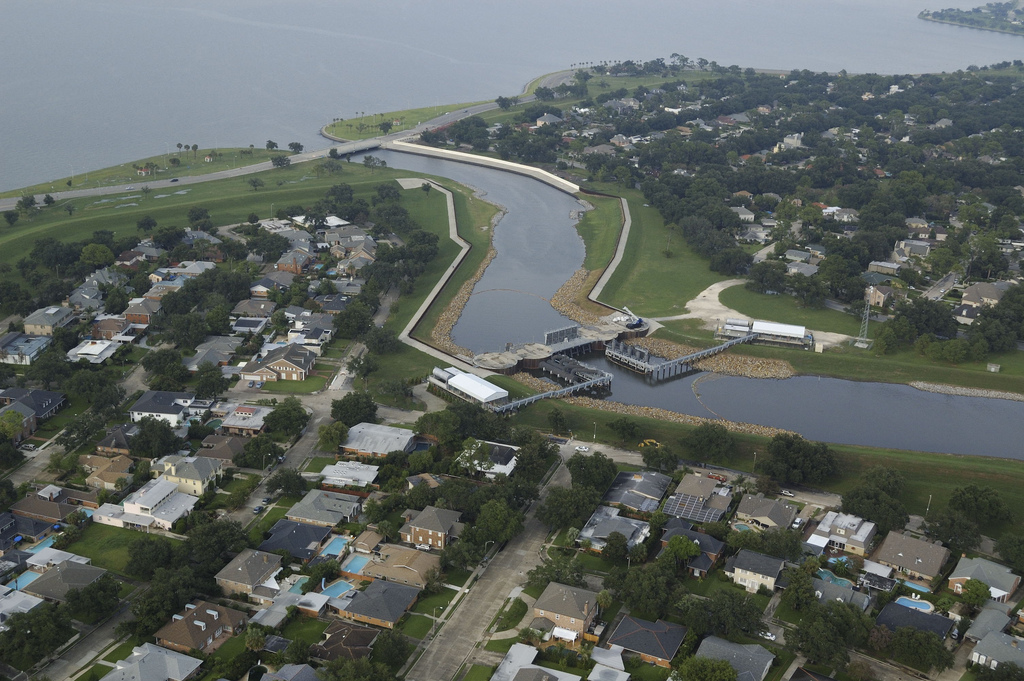
North end of the Orleans Avenue Canal, 2010

The Orleans Canal is a drainage canal in New Orleans, Louisiana. The canal, along with the 17th Street Canal and the London Avenue Canal, form the New Orleans Outfall Canals. The current version of the canal is about 2 km long, running along the up-river side of City Park, through the Lakeview and Lakeshore neighborhood, and into Lake Pontchartrain. It is part of the system used to pump rain water out of the streets of the city into the Lake. The Canal has also been known as the Orleans Avenue Canal, the Orleans Outfall Canal, the Orleans Tail Race, and early on, the Girod Canal.

== History ==
The earliest version of the Orleans Canal did not include any of the current route. It was a drainage ditch dug alongside of Orleans Avenue in the 1830s, running from the Tremé neighborhood into Bayou St. John. It was part of a city drainage plan by state engineer George T. Dunbar. The "Bienville Drainage Machine" was constructed, basically a large paddle-wheel powered by a steam engine, at the corner of Hagen and Bienville Streets, which pushed the current of the Orleans Canal out towards the lake, perhaps the first of what would become many mechanical pumps for removing water from city streets. Dunbar's plans included many other improvements to the city's drainage, but the Panic of 1837 largely halted further implementation plans for decades.

The canal was expanded during the developments and civic improvements in New Orleans in the 1870s. In 1871 drainage improvements rerouted and extended the canal, changing its terminus from the Bayou to the lake. The Canal Street, City Park, and Lake Railroad Company was formed in 1873, and the line was complete and running by 1877. The railway ran from the developed part of the city which still hugged the Mississippi River, with a stop at City Park (which at the time extended only 1 block back from Metairie Road—modern City Park Avenue), then taking a bend at the Lakefront to terminate at Spanish Fort Amusement Park. Much of its route ran alongside the straight line of the canal, which was dug deeper, providing fill for the railway right-of-way through the low swampy area running from Metairie Ridge to the lake. While some 19th-century city maps show a grid of streets in this area, in reality these streets were not extended into this area, and it remained a swamp with little development until the mid-20th century. At the time, the main intention of the canal was to remove water from the developed area on the lake side of the machine, not from the swampy ground along closer to the lake along most of the canal's length.

The first decade of the 20th century saw further improvements. A second pumping station was added closer to the lake at Florida Boulevard (near the current I-610). In 1906 the steam locomotive running along the line was replaced with electric streetcars. The early 20th century a greatly improved drainage pumping system designed by A. Baldwin Wood was installed.

Starting in the late 1920s, the Lake Pontchartrain shore line was extended and lake side levees constructed. The portion of the canal on the river side of Metairie Ridge was enclosed to become sub-street drainage. The levees along the canal further back were raised, as the former swamp was developed after World War II, the area on the downriver side becoming an extension of City Park and on the upriver side the Lakeview residential neighborhood. The level of the water in the canal in this section was and is often higher than the surrounding streets.

== Reconstruction after Hurricane Katrina ==
During Hurricane Katrina in 2005, the Orleans Canal levees and floodwalls did not fail. The Army Corps of Engineers determined this was due, in part, to the presence of an unintended 100-foot-long ‘spillway,’ a section of legacy wall that was significantly lower than the adjacent newer floodwalls adjacent to Pump Station No. 7 at the south end of this canal. The unintended ‘spillway’ was located in an area where eventual floodwall (I-wall) construction would require coordinated efforts between the OLB, the S&WB, the DOTD and, possibly, the Federal Highway Administration. This had not been resolved at the time of Hurricane Katrina’s arrival, so floodwaters simply poured through the open gap, which served to partially relieve water levels within the canal.

This inadvertent ‘spillway’ (gap in the I-wall) was located under a viaduct carrying Interstate-610 where the top of the existing earthen levee crest lay approximately 5–6 feet below the tops of the adja- cent concrete floodwalls. Completion of the floodwall would have likely caused the brick walls of the old pump station to fail unless they had been significantly reinforced. The presence of this spillway (gap) was a sore spot on the record of the Orleans Levee Board and the New Orleans Sewerage & Water Board. Had the canal walls of the 17th Street Canal and the London Avenue Canal not been breached, this spillway could have allowed overtopping for several hours resulting in significant flooding, although not catastrophic flooding. In the end, however, the failures of the 17th Street and London Avenue Canals made this issue moot.

The 17th Street Canal and the London Avenue Canal both experienced catastrophic failures. All three canals were supposedly engineered to the same specifications before the hurricane, and all presumably experienced very similar conditions during the storm.

After Hurricane Katrina, the Bush administration ordered that the new hurricane protection should be able to withstand a storm that has a 1% chance of occurring every year. This is called a "100 year storm." The Army Corps of Engineers decided that, to meet that requirement, new pumping stations and permanent closures would be built on all three of the New Orleans Outfall canals.

== See also ==
- Drainage in New Orleans
- Effect of Hurricane Katrina on New Orleans
- Levee failures in Greater New Orleans, 2005
