= Kern Island Canal =

Irrigation canal in USA

Coordinates: 35°18′55″N 119°01′14″W

Kern Island Canal is an irrigation canal in Kern County, California. It primarily irrigates farmland located on the Kern Lakebed, south of Bakersfield. It originates from a common diversion at Manor Street in Bakersfield, which also supplies the Carrier Canal and Eastside Canal. The common diversion originates from the Kern River about 1 mile (1.6 km) south of Gordon's Ferry.

The canal travels south, roughly parallel to Union Avenue. At 30th Street, just north of SR 178 (Crosstown Freeway), it shifts farther west, running closer to R Street. From here, the canal travels through the Mill Creek Linear Park and Central Park. From there, it continues to meander south until just north of Brundage Lane, where it diverges. The three branches are known as the West, Central, and East Branch. They terminate at the Kern Lakebed.

Part of the canal was dug with the Souther Ditch Plow. It is capable of cutting a furrow 5 feet wide and 3 feet deep. The plow weighed 1,400 pounds and used 40 oxen to pull. It has been restored and is located at the Kern County Museum.
