= 17th Street Canal =

Canal in Louisiana, United States of America

Coordinates: 30°00′41″N 90°07′19″W

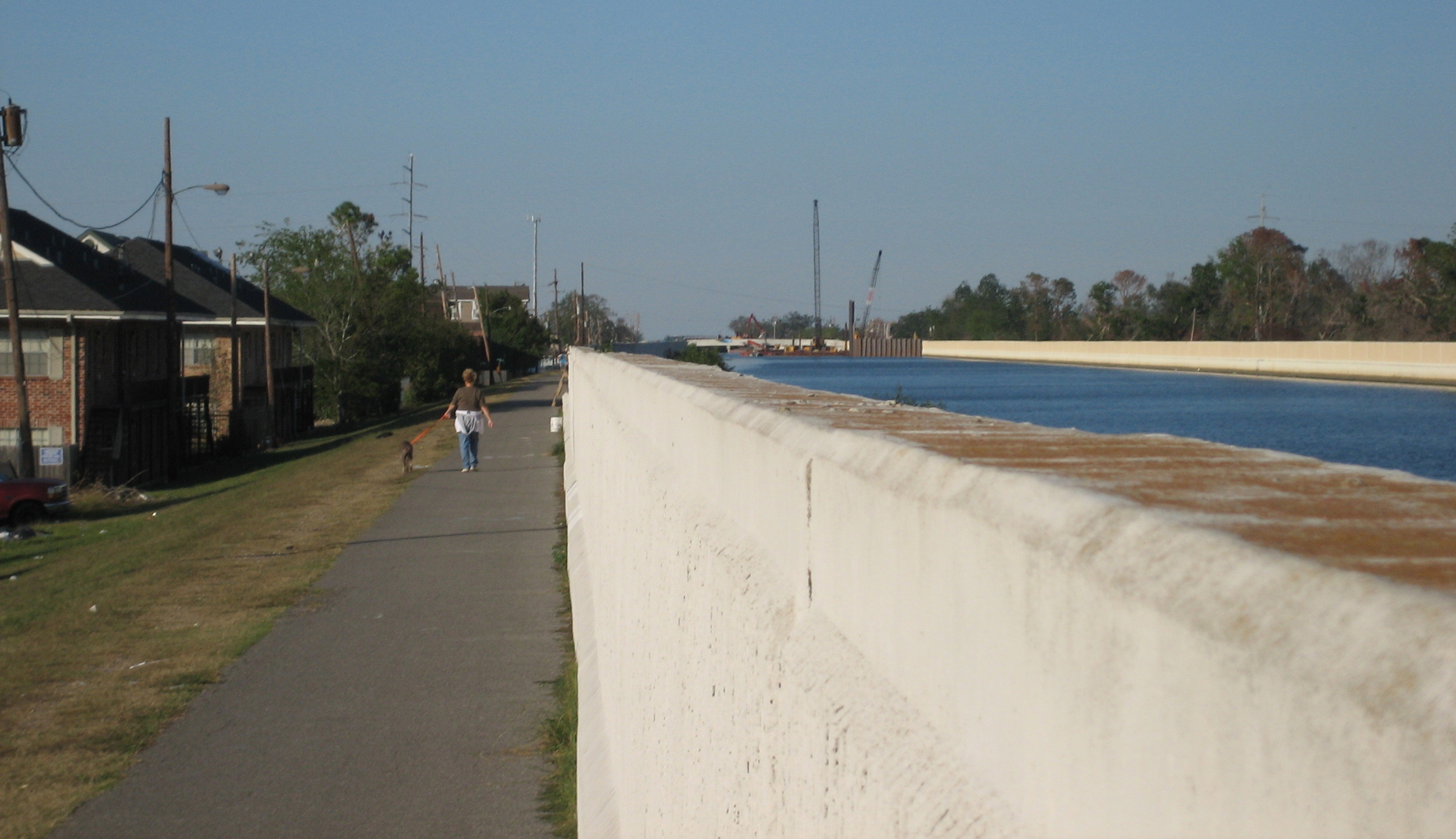
A woman walks her dog along the levee beside the flood wall on the Metairie side of the canal, November 11, 2005. In the background to the right, ongoing repairs in the breach on the New Orleans side can be seen.

The 17th Street Canal is the largest and most important drainage canal in the city of New Orleans. Operating with Pump Station 6, it moves water into Lake Pontchartrain. The canal, along with the Orleans Canal and the London Avenue Canal, form the New Orleans Outfall Canals. The 17th Street Canal forms a significant portion of the boundary between the city of New Orleans and Metairie, Louisiana. The canal has also been known as the Metairie Outlet Canal and the Upperline Canal.

== History ==
The canal that was to become later known as the 17th Street Canal seems to have had its origin at the start of the 1850s as a canal dug through swampy ground to raise a parallel right of way where the Jefferson and Lake Pontchartrain Railway was built. The railway, in business from 1853 through 1864, connected the town of Carrollton, Louisiana (along the Mississippi River front) with a shipping port on Lake Pontchartrain at what became Bucktown, Louisiana, a distance of about 8 km (5.0 mi). At the time, most of the land between the two terminals was undeveloped swamp.

Meanwhile, in 1858, a secondary canal was built to aid in drainage in the low swampy area in "back of town" from Carrollton, with its head at what is now the intersection of Dublin and Palmetto streets, connecting to the Railway canal a short distance on the river side of the Metairie Ridge.

The railway was discontinued on December 31, 1864, as competing rail lines between the river and lake were more successful. The city of New Orleans annexed Carrollton, and the canal became the boundary line between Orleans Parish and Jefferson Parish. As the canal marked the up-river limit of Orleans Parish, it became known as the Upperline Canal.

The spur canal in the back of Carrollton was beside a projected street numbered "17th Street" (although at the time there was little actual development in back of Claiborne Avenue), and that canal was thus the first to be known as the "17th Street Canal", a name which would later come to commonly refer to the large canal which this is connected to.

=== Improved drainage with pumping stations ===
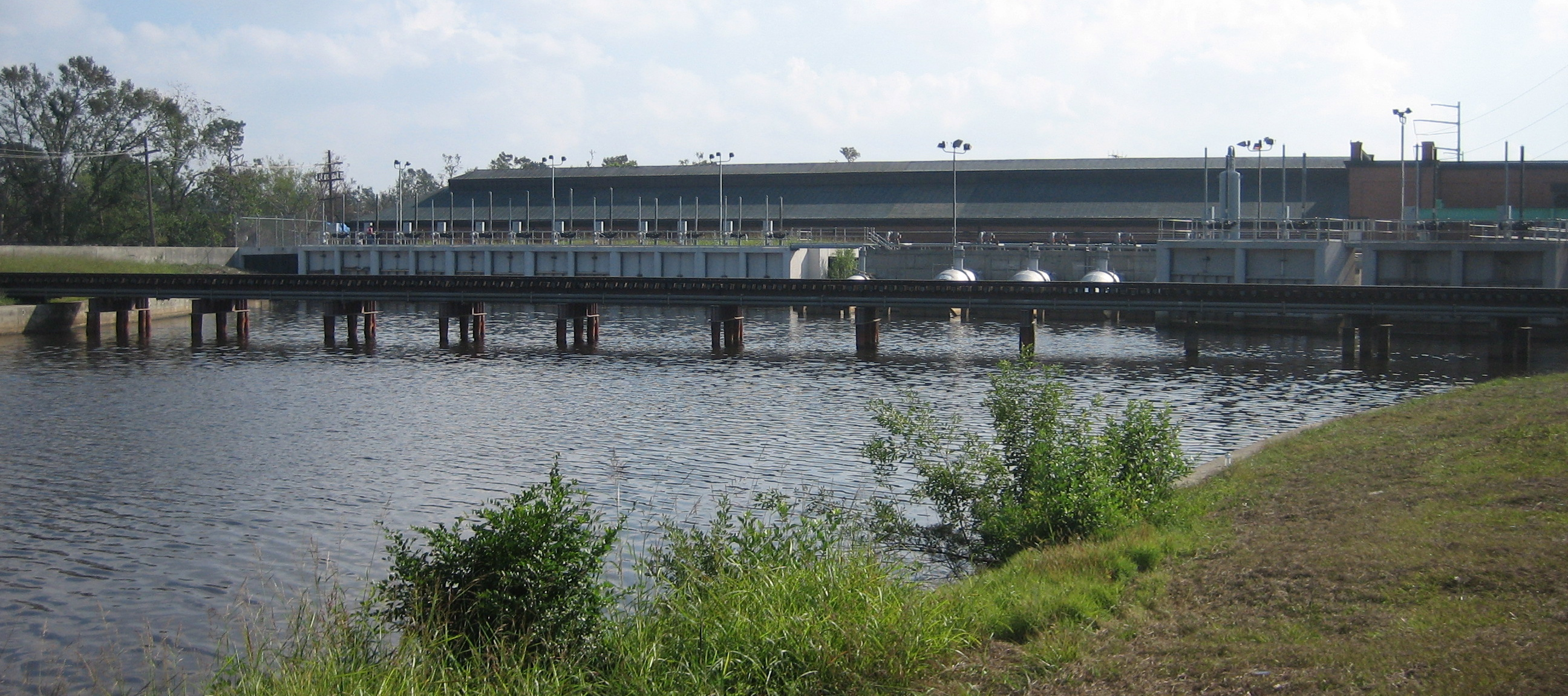
"Pumping Station 6" astride the Canal from the back (lake) side

By the 1870s, a steam engine powered pump known as the "Dublin Street Machine" at the back of the Carrollton neighborhood was used to drain that neighborhood, pumping the water out the Upperline Canal. Use of the canal to pump water from the streets of the city into Lake Pontchartrain grew with the city. The Claiborne Canal connected with the 17th and Upperline Canal system via a canal along Dublin Avenue; thus the canal served to carry rain water to the lake from the majority of Uptown New Orleans above the New Basin Canal. Another canal, Hoey's Canal, was added connecting to the Upperline from up river to help drain the back of the Jefferson Parish communities along the riverfront, now known as "Old Jefferson".

In 1894, "17th Street" was renamed "Palmetto Street" (later redesignated Palmetto Avenue), but the canal continued to be popularly known by the old street name.

In 1899 a new pumping station was opened atop the Canal a couple blocks back from Metairie Road. In the early 20th century, new high-efficiency pumps designed by A. Baldwin Wood were installed, and remain in operation.

At the start of the 21st century, Pumping Station 6, or the Metairie Pumping Station, astride the canal had 15 pumps capable of moving over six billion gallons of water a day through the station. Runoff from substantial areas of Uptown New Orleans, Metairie, and surrounding neighborhoods drains into the canals and basins on the river side of the pumping station, which pulls the water up into the portion of the 17th Street Canal flowing into Lake Pontchartrain.

=== 20th century: Residential development of the "Back of Town" ===
When the Station 6 was constructed, it was at the "back" end of the developed part of town. As the area alongside the canal closer to the lake was largely undeveloped swamp, it was originally of little concern if waters pumped out of the city topped the canal and flowed into the swamp during heavy rains.

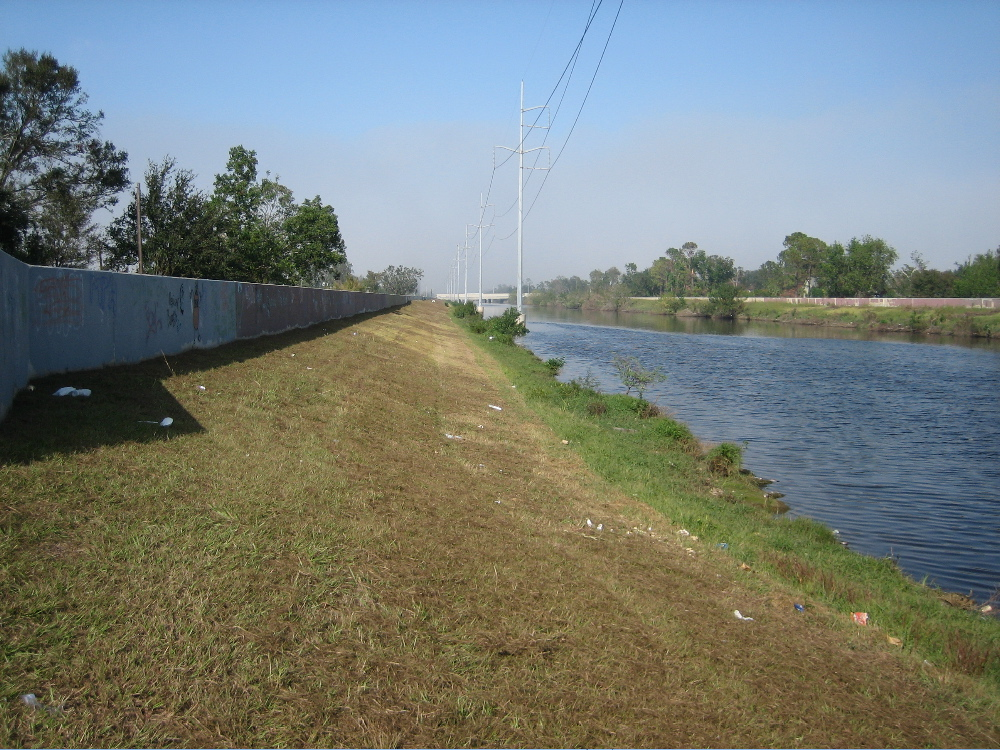
A portion of the 17th Street Canal, looking lakeward from behind the Metairie Road Pumping Station. Note the levees topped with concrete flood walls.

In the late 1920s and the 1930s, a project dredged fill along the lakefront, creating new land in what had been Lake Pontchartrain and creating a sizable levee along the lake side. However, no efforts were made to raise the swampland between Metairie Ridge and the new lakefront fill. The areas along the Canal from Metairie Ridge to the Lake were substantially developed for residential use after World War II, and levees along the "back" sections of the Canal were raised. The water level of the canal is often significantly higher than the surrounding streets.

After Hurricane Betsy, improved flood protection for the city and its canals to cope with storm surge from hurricanes was mandated, resulting in increasing the size and height of the canal levees. In 1998 Hurricane Georges elevated the level of Lake Pontchartrain, pushing lake waters into the canal. A report noted that there was at least one place where the water came within inches of topping the flood wall. An upgrade of the canal levees, flood walls, and bridges began in 1999. The canal was considered in good shape at the start of the 2005 Atlantic Hurricane Season.

Before Katrina arrived, the 17th Street Canal was the largest and most important drainage canal in the city of New Orleans. Operating with Pumping Station No. 6 – which at that time was the most powerful pumping station in the world – the 17th Street Canal was capable of conveying 9,200 cubic feet per second (cfs) of water, more than the Orleans Avenue and London Avenue Canals combined. (The Orleans Avenue Canal, at maximum capacity, could pump 2,200 cfs and the London Avenue Canal, at maximum capacity, could pump 5,200 cfs.)

== Hurricane Katrina ==
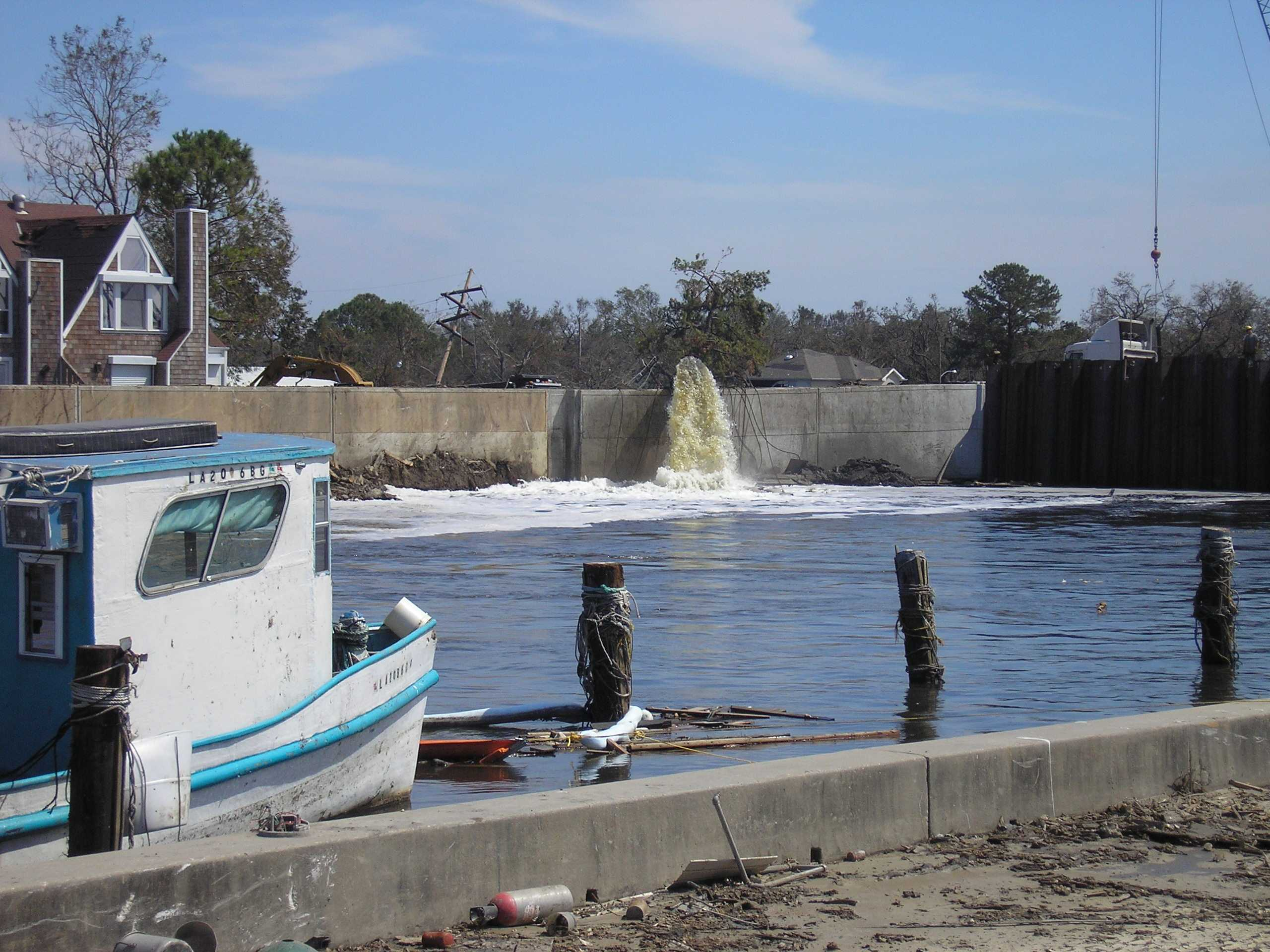
Water is pumped out of the Lakeview neighborhood of New Orleans into the 17th Street Canal.

At about 6:30 am on August 29, 2005, a portion of the I-wall along the east side of the 17th Street Canal adjacent to the 6900 block of Bellaire Drive split open, sending torrents of water into New Orleans' Lakeview neighborhood. The water level in the Canal at the time of failure was about 5 feet lower than the top of the I-wall, well below the design water level. The breach released storm-surge floodwaters that destroyed buildings, homes, and infrastructure, throughout all but the highest areas within the city. The initial breach expanded to a nearly 450-foot wide gap. Thirty-one (31) victims were recovered from areas directly flooded due to the breach of the 17th Street Canal levee.

=== Investigations into the breach ===
Two teams investigated the failure, the Interagency Performance Evaluation Task Force (IPET) and the Independent Levee Investigation Team (ILIT). The studies confirmed that the canal flood wall failed at significantly lower water level than the top of the flood wall due to faulty design. In August 2007, the Corps announced the results of an engineering analysis applying more stringent post-Katrina design criteria which showed the maximum safe load on some of the surviving flood walls is only 7 feet (2.1 m) of water, which is half the original 14-foot (4.3 m) design intent.

On November 10, 2005, an article in the Times-Picayune revealed that sonar soundings discovered that the steel sheet pilings of the levee flood wall were 2.1 m (7 ft) less deep than engineering specifications. Sample pilings pulled up were found to be of the length specified in the design (17 feet), but it was then revealed that this length was less than the actual depth of the canal, in retrospect an obvious engineering mistake. Current analysis concludes that the catastrophic breach was due to faulty design, rather than storm surge higher than what the canal was designed to withstand. According to an article published in the August 2015 issue of the official journal of the World Water Council, the Army Corps of Engineers misinterpreted the results of a Sheet Pile Load test (E-99 Study) conducted in the mid-1980s and concluded they needed to drive sheet pilings to depths of not more than 17 feet, rather than the necessary 31 to 46 feet. This move saved millions but greatly reduced overall engineering reliability.

== Reconstruction after Katrina ==
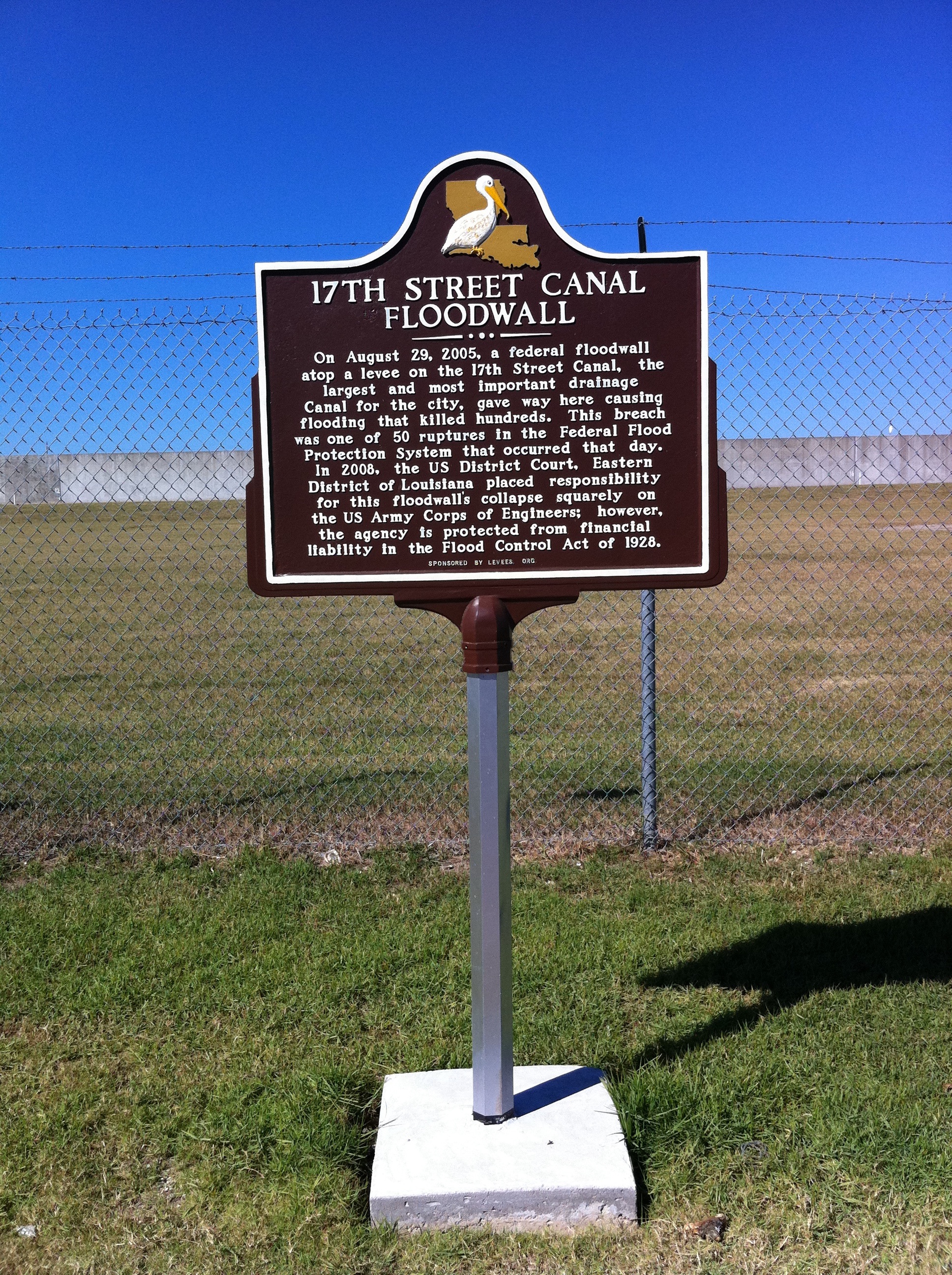
Louisiana State Historic Plaque at the site of the 17th Street Canal levee breach. Vetted and fact checked by the Louisiana Office of Historic Preservation.

The Corps constructed a permanent auxiliary pump station. During a hurricane event, the gate will be closed and its pump station will operate in tandem with local Pump Station 6 to act as a barrier to storm surge and lake flooding. In January 2006, the U.S. Army Corps of Engineers announced it had finished the temporary repairs of the breached section of the levee, and construction of more permanent repairs would commence. As a temporary measure, the corps constructed storm-surge barrier gates and an interim pump station at the lake end of the canal. In February 2007, a contract was awarded to WESTON Solutions to increase the pumping capacity of the 17th Street Canal.

In June 2008, plans were announced by the Corps of Engineers to clear private land for access to the flood wall and levee. This land comprises the backyards along Bellaire Drive on the New Orleans (east) side of the canal. On July 7, 2008, a state court judge ruled the Corps could continue, but that property owners could seek compensation. Plans to clear encroachments on the west (Jefferson Parish) side of the canal were to begin with field surveys in early 2009.

A whistle blower claimed the temporary pumps have inadequate capacity to prevent the canal from overflowing and predicted failure of both the pumps and gates. But on September 1, 2008, the gates were closed as Hurricane Gustav approached the Louisiana coast. Both hydraulic and direct drive pumps were operated without problem for several hours during the peak storm surge. The gates remained closed for 18 hours and pumps were operated over a 9-hour period to keep the city from flooding.

In August 2010, the grassroots group Levees.org installed a plaque, vetted and fact checked by the Louisiana State Office of Historic Preservation, at the levee breach site. The text of the plaque reads as follows:

On August 29, 2005, a federal floodwall atop a levee on the 17th Street Canal, the largest and most important drainage canal for the city, gave way here causing flooding that killed hundreds. This breach was one of 50 ruptures in the federal Flood Protection System that occurred that day. In 2008, the US District Court placed responsibility for this floodwall's collapse squarely on the US Army Corps of Engineers; however, the agency is protected from financial liability in the Flood Control Act of 1928.

In 2017, seventeen Patterson pumps are set to be operational as part of the New Orleans Permanent Canal Closures and Pumps (PCCP) project with the 17 Street Canal receiving six large capacity and two smaller pumps. The large pumps are rated at 1,800 cfs and are the centerpiece of the project which is designed to handle a 100-year storm.

== See also ==
- Drainage in New Orleans
- London Avenue Canal
- Industrial Canal
- Effect of Hurricane Katrina on New Orleans
- U.S. Army Corps of Engineers civil works controversies (New Orleans)
