= Tamiami Canal =

Canal in South Florida

Coordinates: 25.7952°N 80.2445°W

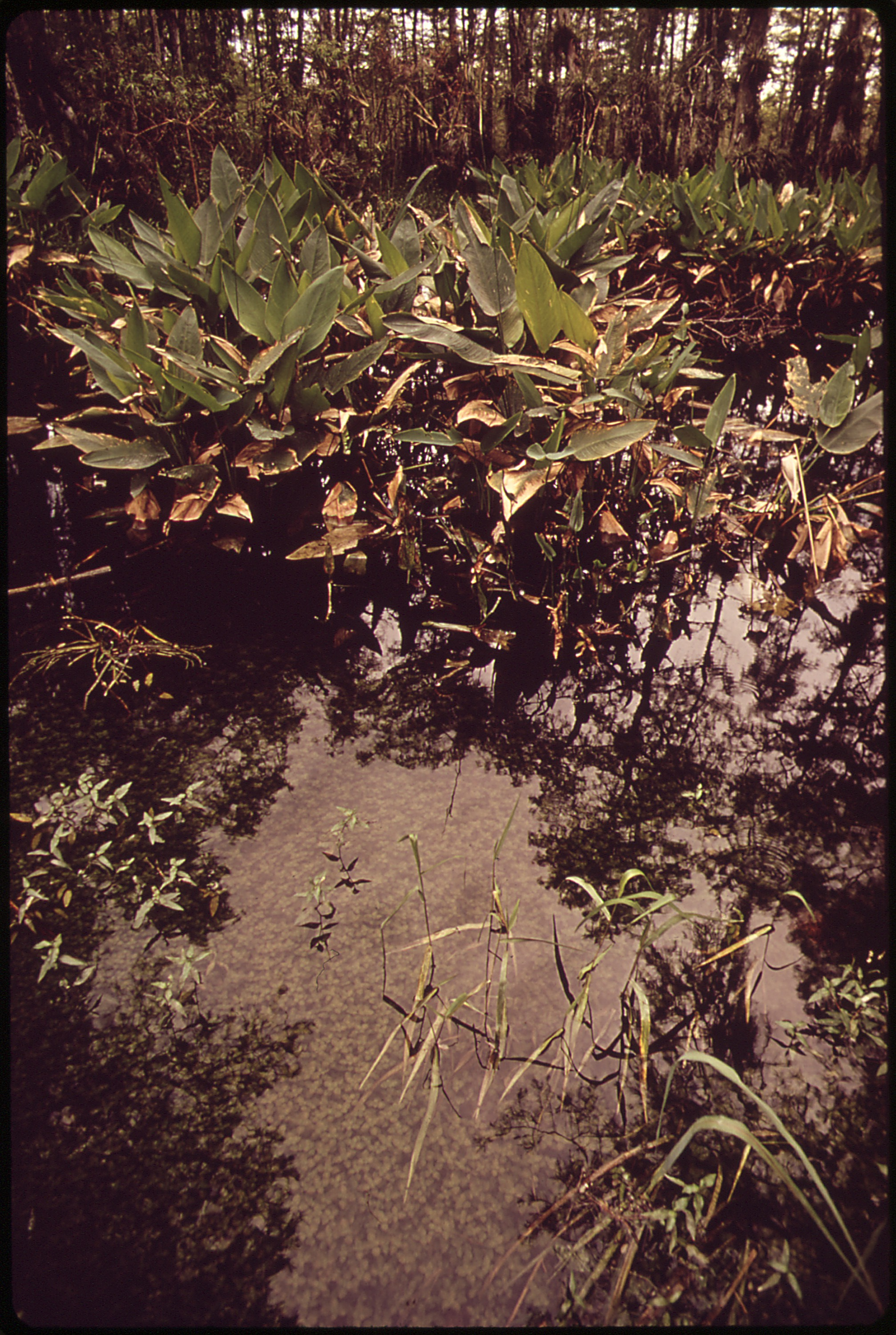
Tamiami Canal area

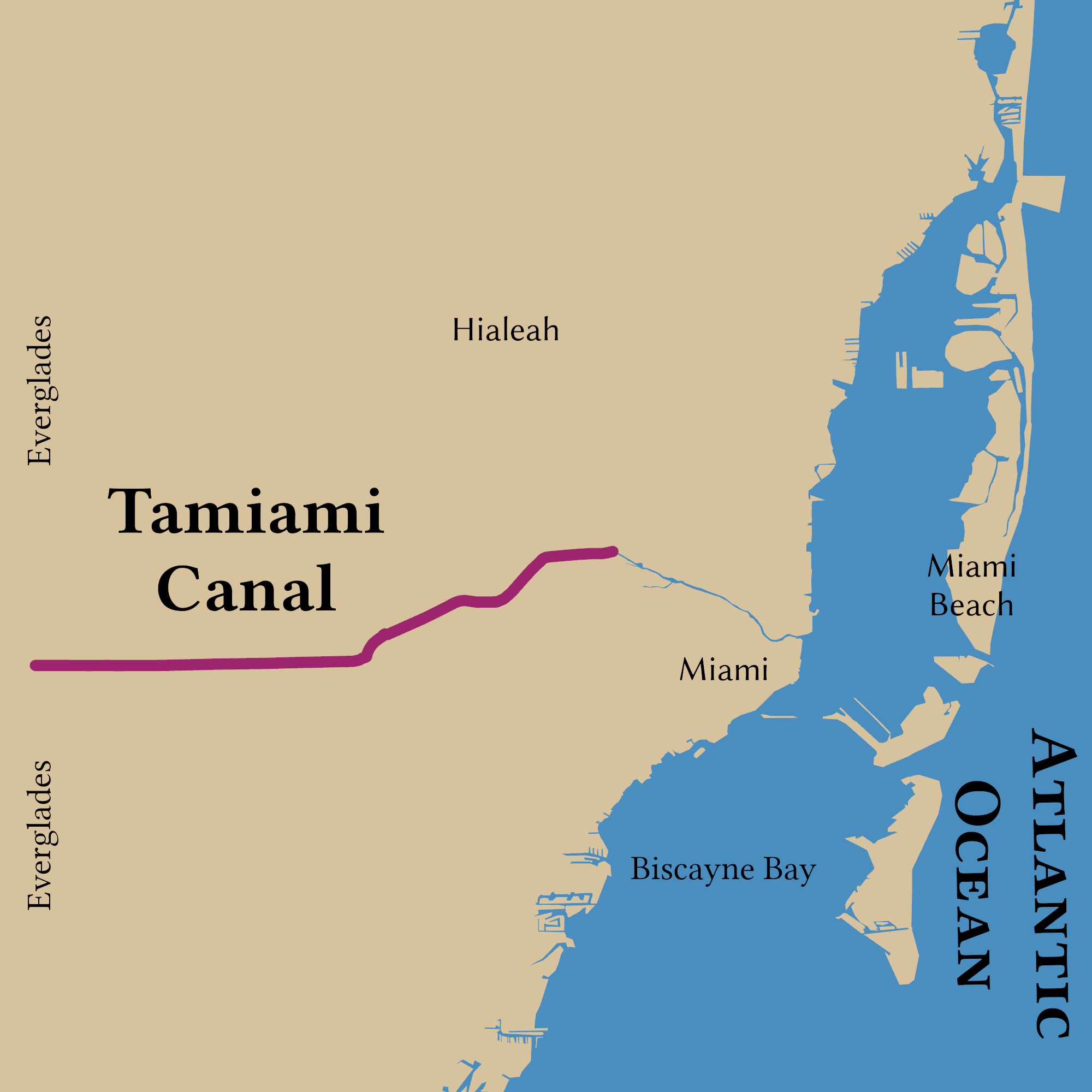
Path of the canal

The Tamiami Canal or C-4 Canal, is a canal located in southern Florida in the United States. It flows in a west to east direction from the western part of the state in the Everglades past the Miami International Airport to a salinity control center near the Miami River. It averages 8 feet (2.4 metres) in depth and is over 100 feet (30 metres) wide in some areas.

In 2019, a worm-shaped amphibian caecilian, Typhlonectes natans, was found living in the canal. Normally found in Venezuela and Colombia, its capture was the first record of a caecilian in the United States.

== See also ==
- Miami Canal
