= Conewago Canal =

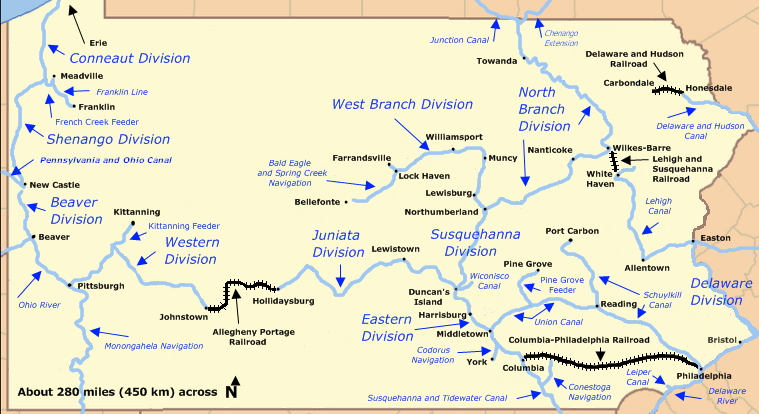
- Map of historic Pennsylvania canals and connecting railroads
- Interactive map of Conewago Canal

Specifications
- Locks: 3
- Maximum height AMSL: 384 ft (117 m) (Elevation of York Haven)
- Status: Abandoned

History
- Original owner: Francis Thomas
- Principal engineer: James Brindley, nephew of the James Brindley who built the Duke of Bridgewater's canals in England
- Construction began: 1793
- Date completed: 1797

Geography
- Start point: York Haven
- End point: York Haven

The Conewago Canal, on the west bank of the Susquehanna River below York Haven, Pennsylvania, 11 miles (18 km) south of Harrisburg in York County, enabled late 18th and early 19th century rivercraft to safely bypass rapids at Conewago Falls. Work on the canal of less than 1 mile (1.6 km) began in 1793 and was completed in 1797. Robert Morris, a Philadelphia financier, organized the project, which was carried out by chief engineer James Brindley, the nephew of a well-known British engineer of the same name. Two lift locks overcame 19 feet (6 m) of elevation between the ends of the canal, and a guard lock blocked unwanted water, particularly during floods. Cargo could go upstream as well as down. A boat going upriver could navigate the canal in 37 minutes compared to the whole day it would take 30 or 40 men to pull it upriver along the bank.

Despite the canal, flow variations limited the use of the river for shipping to a few months each year. In addition, river boat captains disliked paying the toll required to use the privately owned canal. River arks, a kind of boat less susceptible to damage from rocks in the rapids, made it possible to run the rapids and avoid the toll. The Eastern Division of the Pennsylvania Canal, which ran between Columbia and the mouth of the Juniata River, later bypassed this same section of the river.

== History ==
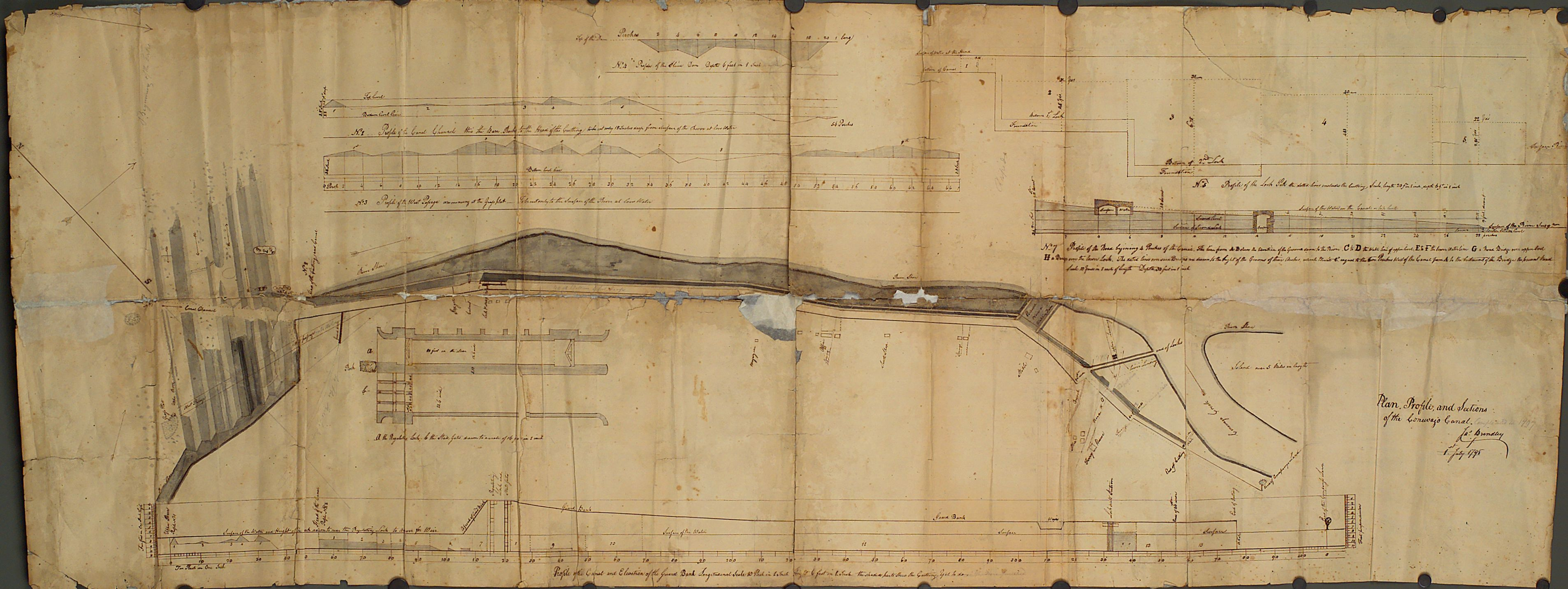
1795 Plan of Conewago Canal by James Brindley

Because of the state's underlying geology, the Susquehanna River and its tributaries above Conewago Falls were more navigable than the lower river. Upstream, keelboats and Durham boats could transport cargo on these streams, but the Susquehanna's last 50 miles (80 km) or so to the Chesapeake Bay were fast, shallow, and rocky. Until completion of the Conewago Canal, most boats stopped at Middletown, unloading cargoes of lumber, wheat, and iron for shipment to Philadelphia over 100 miles (161 km) of poor road. Middletown, on the east bank of the river, and York Haven on the west bank became important flour milling centers because shipping barrels of flour in wagons from the Susquehanna Valley to Philadelphia or Baltimore was less expensive than shipping unmilled loads of wheat. In 1791, the Pennsylvania legislature authorized funds to improve navigation on the Susquehanna River above Columbia to enhance trade to and from Philadelphia. Though privately funded, the Conewago Canal became part of these general plans.

Pennsylvania's plans for east–west trade also included an improved highway, the Philadelphia and Lancaster Turnpike, 64 miles (103 km) of stone and gravel built by a private company in 1794. An extension of 10 miles (16 km) from Lancaster to Columbia and the Susquehanna River was added in 1803. After 1797, boats could use the Conewago Canal to bypass the rough water and continue to Columbia, where cargoes were unloaded for shipment by wagon. After 1803, the improved road went all the way from Columbia to Philadelphia.

On October 3, 2026, the Pennsylvania Historical and Museum Commission (PHMC) dedicated a state historical marker commemorating the canal. The marker was erected near the intersection of North Front Street and Pennsylvania Avenue, in front of the York Haven Library and borough office. The Emigsville Band performed as a part of the ceremony.

== See also ==
- List of canals in the United States
