= Carrier Canal =

Coordinates: 35°21′49″N 119°03′58″W

Carrier Canal is an irrigation canal in Kern County, California. It originates from a common diversion at Manor Street in Bakersfield, which also supplies the Kern Island Canal and Eastside Canal. The common diversion originates from the Kern River about 1 mile (1.6 km) south of Gordon's Ferry. There are additional diversions from the Kern River at Golden State Highway (SR 204 freeway) and Coffee Road. The canal terminates at the Kern River, near Enos Lane west of Bakersfield. For its entire length, it runs roughly parallel to the Kern River.

The canal was created as a result of the Kern River Miller-Haggin Water Agreement of 1888. The compromise guarantees a certain percentage of water from the Kern River, measured at the First Point of Measurement, near Gordon's Ferry, reaches the Second Point of Measurement, near Enos Lane. The canal is used to divert water from the Kern River between those two points. Stine Canal and Buena Vista Canal, which branch from the Carrier Canal, are used to deliver water to other customers south of Bakersfield.
