= Gordon's Ferry =

Historic site in California

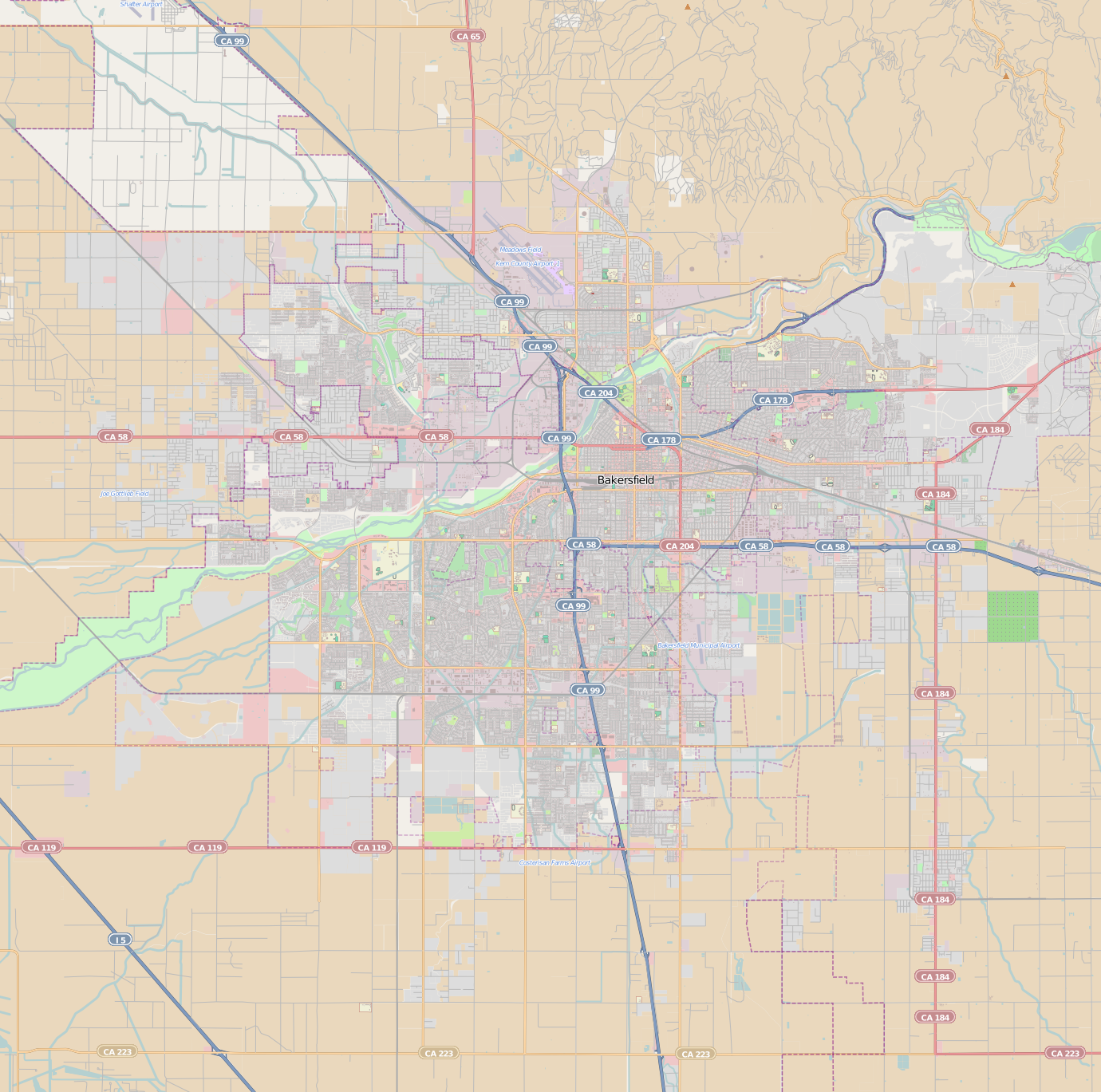
- Location within Bakersfield, California Location within California
- 35°25′32″N 118°58′4″W
- Location: Bakersfield, California

History
- Built: Ferry (1853), Bridge (1901)

Site notes
- Area: Northeast Bakersfield
- Governing body: City of Bakersfield

California Historical Landmark
- Official name: Gordon's Ferry on the Kern River
- Designated: January 17, 1937
- Reference no.: 137

Gordon's Ferry is both a geographical location and a historic site in Bakersfield, California. It is located where China Grade Loop crosses the Kern River and meets with Alfred Harrell Highway in Northeast Bakersfield. It is named after a ferry that used to cross the river near the existing bridge. It was one of the only eastern crossings, until 1877, when the Jewett Avenue bridge was constructed farther west. It is California Historical Landmark #137.

== History ==
The 49ers, on their way to the gold fields during the California Gold Rush, used this place as a ford crossing. In 1853, as the Kern River Gold Rush began, Major Aneas Gordon begin operating a ferry at the crossing of the Stockton - Los Angeles Road. It was an overhead cable type, with a flat bottom boat. With a growing number of settlers coming to the region, the ferry experienced much traffic.

=== Butterfield Overland Mail ===
In 1857, the Butterfield Overland Mail 1st Division was established and used the ferry on its San Francisco to St. Louis postal route. The stage company would establish a station at that location (one of six in Kern County), which was called the Kern River Station.

Butterfield Overland Mail continued to use the ferry until the outbreak of the American Civil War in 1861. Because the original route crossed into the Confederacy, the U.S. postmaster directed Butterfield to change to the Central Overland Route. Kern River Station would continue to be used by other stagecoach companies until the railroad made them obsolete. The ferry would continue to be used by settlers and residents until 1877, when the Jewett Avenue bridge was constructed to the west.

=== Oilfield and bridges ===
As a river crossing, Gordon's Ferry sat empty for many years. However, oil was discovered in the Kern River Oil Field in 1899 (the first oil discovery in Kern County). The oilfield was just north of Gordon's Ferry. Oil was hauled out by trains, which were located in Sumner and Bakersfield, which is south of the river. As a result, in 1901 a wooden bridge was constructed at the previous ferry crossing.

It would later be replaced with the concrete bridge that exists today. In 1937, the site would be declared a California Historical Landmark—the first in Kern County.

The California Historical Landmark reads:

NO. 137 GORDON'S FERRY ON THE KERN RIVER - Gordon's Ferry was an overhead cable-type of ferry operated during the 1850s by Major Gordon. An adobe station house was located on the south bank of the Kern River, just a few yards to the west of this marker, which also served as a station on the Butterfield Overland Mail Route from 1856 to 1860. Registered June 6, 1934.

The marker is located near the Kern River bridge, on China Loop, 1,000 ft South of Round Mountain Road, Bakersfield.

== See also ==
- California Historical Landmarks in Kern County
- California Historical Landmark
