= Gap (landform) =

Low point in a ridge or line of hills

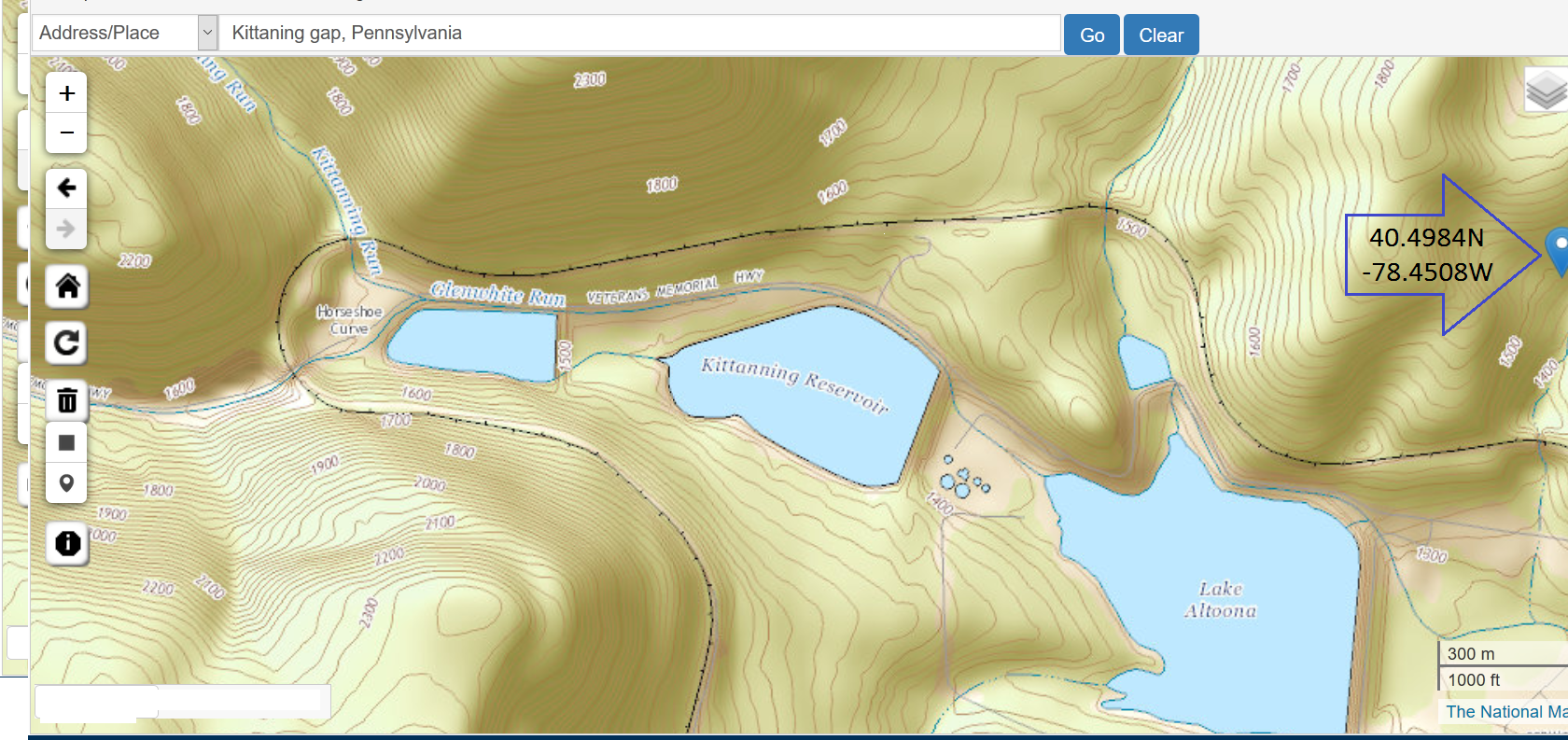
A zoomed in view of the image below showing the Location of Kittanning Gap, one of the gaps of the Allegheny, along a tributary of the Kittanning Run. • The USGS GNIS systems placement of the location of Kittanning Gap, is along a tributary of the Kittanning Run, not in the notch formed by the main stream. The black trace in this map forming a hairpin turn above the Lakes is the famous & historic Horseshoe Curve built by the Pennsylvania Railroad which crosses over four different streams sitting in the bottom end of water gaps in the view, and finishes its climb in a fifth, seen below in the next (zoomed out) map, just north of a sixth Blair Gap, where the historical Allegheny Portage Railroad climbed the Allegheny escarpment heading west.

A gap is a geological formation that is a low point or opening between hills or mountains or in a ridge or mountain range.

It may be called a col, notch, pass, saddle, water gap, or wind gap. Geomorphologically, a gap is most often carved by water erosion from a freshet, stream or a river. Gaps created by freshets are often, if not normally, devoid of water through much of the year, their streams being dependent upon the meltwaters of a snow pack. Gaps sourced by small springs will generally have a small stream excepting perhaps during the most arid parts of the year.

Water gaps of necessity often cut entirely through a barrier range and riverine gaps may create canyons such as the riverine gaps of the Danube River, Lehigh River Gorge, the Colorado River's Grand Canyon and the Genesee River. Such cuttings may expose millennia of strata in the local rock column writing the geologic record.
