= Bald Eagle Creek Path =

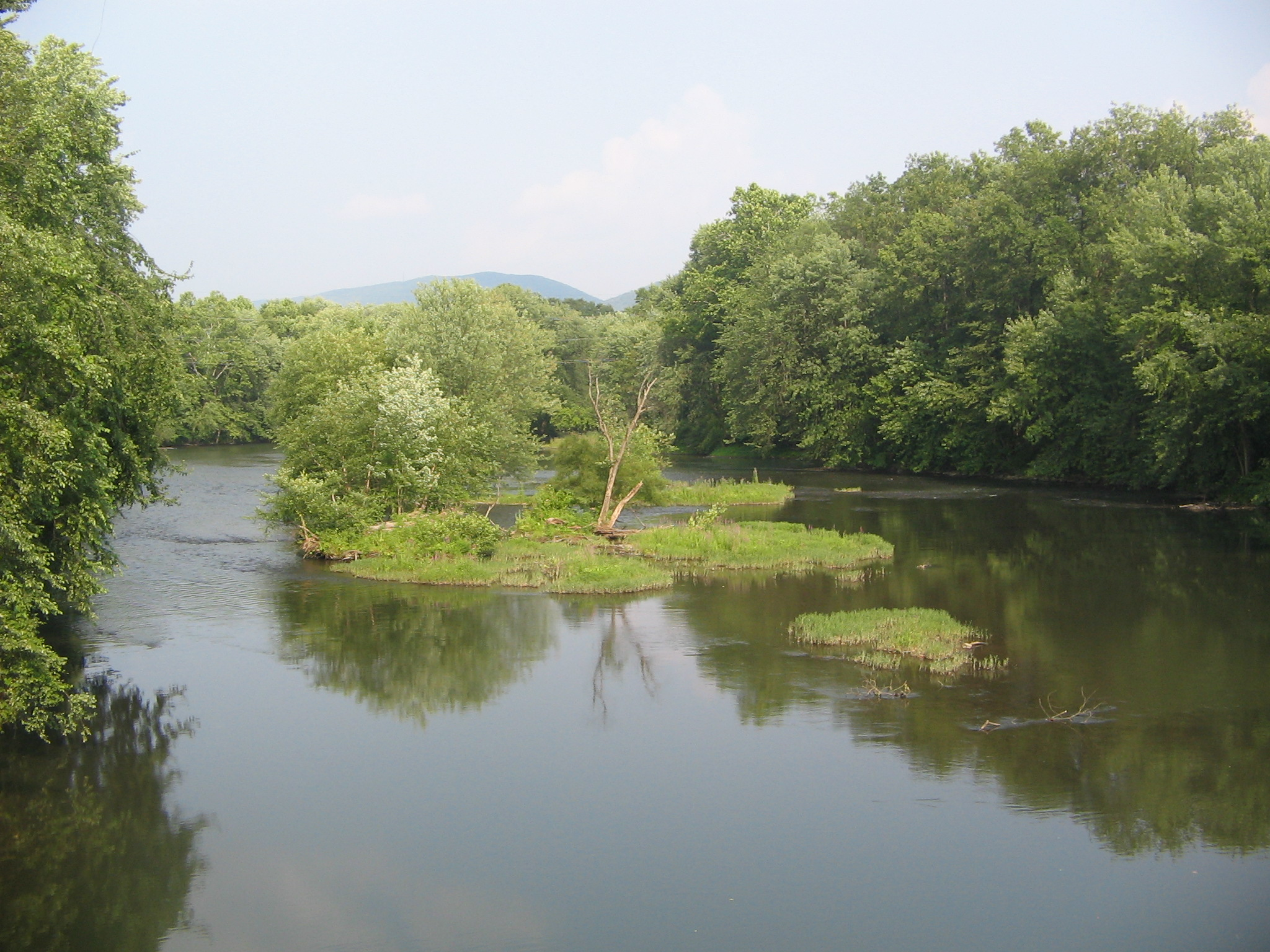
The Bald Eagle Creek Path took its name from Bald Eagle Creek, which the northern part of the trail followed.

The Bald Eagle Creek Path (also one of several known as the Warriors Path) was a major Native American trail in the U.S. State of Pennsylvania that ran from the Great Island (near modern-day Lock Haven) on the West Branch Susquehanna River southwest to what is now the village of Frankstown on the Frankstown Branch Juniata River. The path ran from Clinton County southwest through Centre County and a small part of Blair County to its southern end in Blair County. It was part of a "Warriors Path", an important connector between paths leading to New York and the Six Nations of the Iroquois and the Ohio River country in the north and west, and paths leading to what are now Maryland, Virginia, and the Carolinas in the south.

== Course ==
The Bald Eagle Creek Path started at the Great Island (today in the modern city of Lock Haven), which is in the West Branch Susquehanna River at the mouth of Bald Eagle Creek. The Great Island and surrounding area were home to several Native American villages, and were also at the intersection of multiple Native American paths. The Great Island Path went east to the village of Shamokin (modern day Sunbury) at the confluence of the West and North Branches of the Susquehanna River, and the Great Shamokin Path followed the West Branch to the same destination, connecting to a number of other paths leading north along the way. The Great Shamokin Path left the river and continued west from the Great Island; it led to Kittanning on the Allegheny River. The Sinnemahoning Path followed the West Branch west, then Sinnemahoning Creek north to the Allegheny River and the Iroquois beyond.

After leaving the Great Island, the path ran along the west side (left bank) of Bald Eagle Creek and soon crossed into what is now Centre County, where it passed through what is now Bald Eagle State Park. Opposite the Lenape (or Delaware) village of Bald Eagle's Nest (modern Milesburg), the path crossed the creek and went through the water gap in Bald Eagle Mountain made by Spring Creek. The path turned south again at the site of modern Bellefonte, and followed Buffalo Run along the eastern side of Bald Eagle Mountain as far as the modern village of Waddle. Continuing on a southwest course along the edge of Bald Eagle Mountain, the path left Centre County and crossed the extreme northwest corner of what is now Huntingdon County. There it passed the Native American village of Warriors Mark and followed Logan Spring Run into what is now Blair County.

In Blair County, the path followed Logan Spring Run to the Little Juniata River, then followed that upstream to modern Tyrone. Between what is now Tyrone and Bellwood, the path briefly crossed the Little Juniata to the west (left) bank, then crossed back again to the east (right) bank. Continuing southwest, the path reached the current site of Altoona and left the Little Juniata, heading south to what is now Hollidaysburg. There it followed the Beaverdam Branch Juniata River to the Frankstown Branch Juniata River at the modern village of Frankstown and the southern end of the path. Several paths met at the Native American village of Frankstown, including a Warriors Path that led south to Maryland, Virginia, and on to the Catawba and Cherokee peoples in North and South Carolina. The Kittanning Path was one of a few that led west from Frankstown to the Allegheny and Ohio Rivers.

== History ==
Bald Eagle or Woapalanee was a Lenape chief whose village at modern Milesburg, Pennsylvania was known as Bald Eagle's Nest or Wapalanewachschiechey. The identity of Bald Eagle is unclear though. One chief with that name, who was "friendly and respected" was murdered on the Monongahela River in 1773. Another Bald Eagle, for whom the historic record is less clear, is traditionally supposed to have been the leader of raiding parties against white settlers on the West Branch Susquehanna River during the American Revolutionary War. He killed a brother of Samuel Brady near Williamsport in 1778 and Brady killed him on the Allegheny River in what is now Clarion County the next year. In any case, Bald Eagle gave his name directly or indirectly to Bald Eagle Mountain, two Bald Eagle Creeks, the Bald Eagle Creek Path, Bald Eagle State Park, the Nittany and Bald Eagle Railroad, and Bald Eagle Township.

In 1949, the Pennsylvania Historical and Museum Commission put up a historical marker on Pennsylvania Route 150 near the borough of Howard commemorating the path, which it called the "Warriors Path". Wallace's book Indian Paths of Pennsylvania, originally published in 1964 and since updated, noted that many north–south paths were called Warriors Path, and called this Bald Eagle Creek Path.

While the path no longer exists, several highways approximate portions of its course. From Lock Haven to Milesburg to Bellefonte, Pennsylvania Route 150 follows the creek and general course of the path fairly closely. From Bellefonte to Tyrone, Pennsylvania Route 550 is a close approximation to the route of the path. From Tyrone to Hollidaysburg, US Route 220 and Interstate 99 approximately follow the path, and US Route 22 is on the same general route from Hollidaysburg to Frankstown.
