= Kittanning Run =

River in Pennsylvania, United States

Coordinates: 40.498333°N 78.450833°W

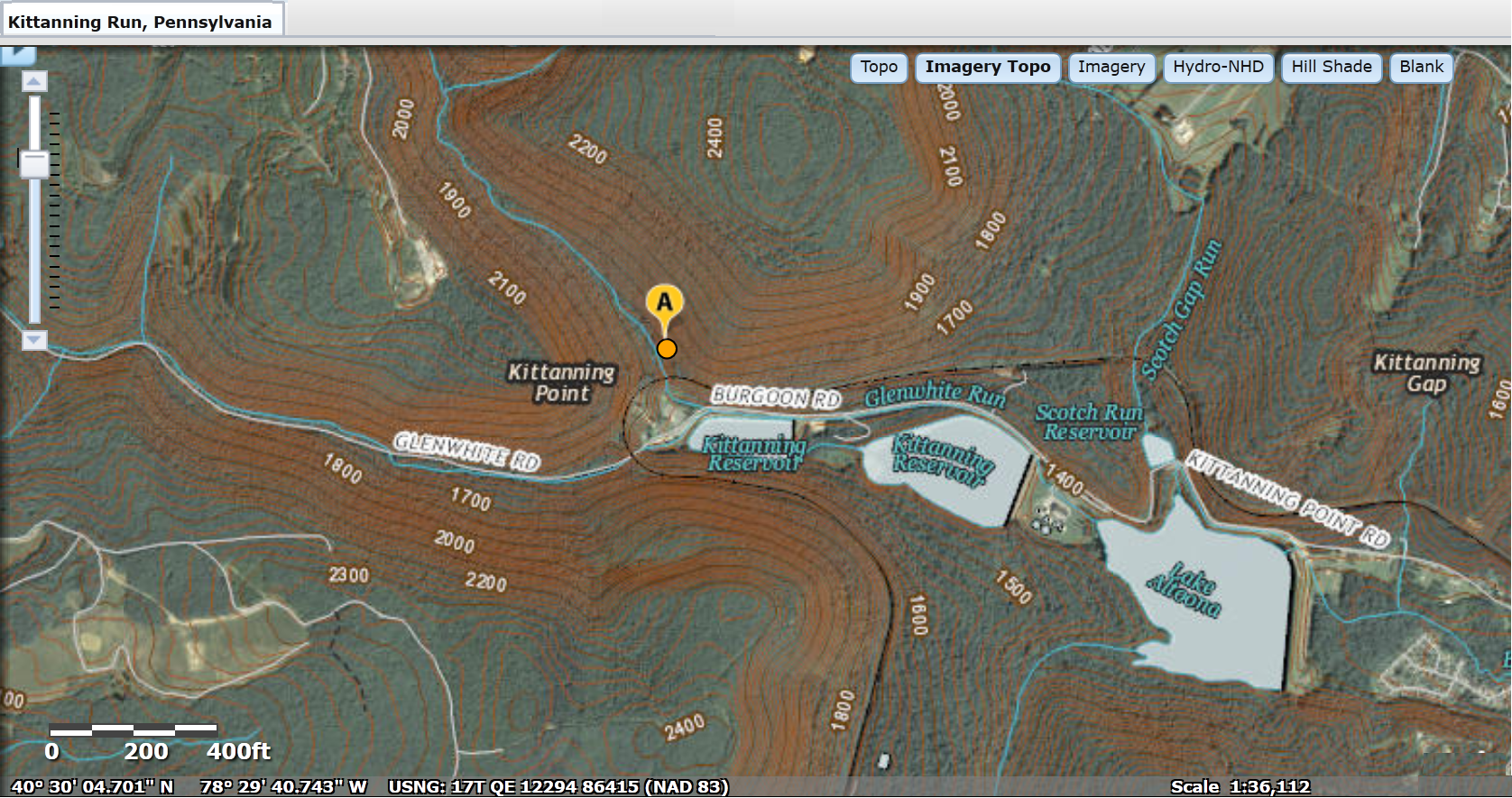
USGS combined topological and relief map mode view with search object 'Kittanning Run'. The Web software identifies the search item with short yellow point icon containing the 'A' (circled). • The dark trace forming a hairpin turn directly below that marker is the Pennsylvania Railroad's historically famous Horseshoe Curve.

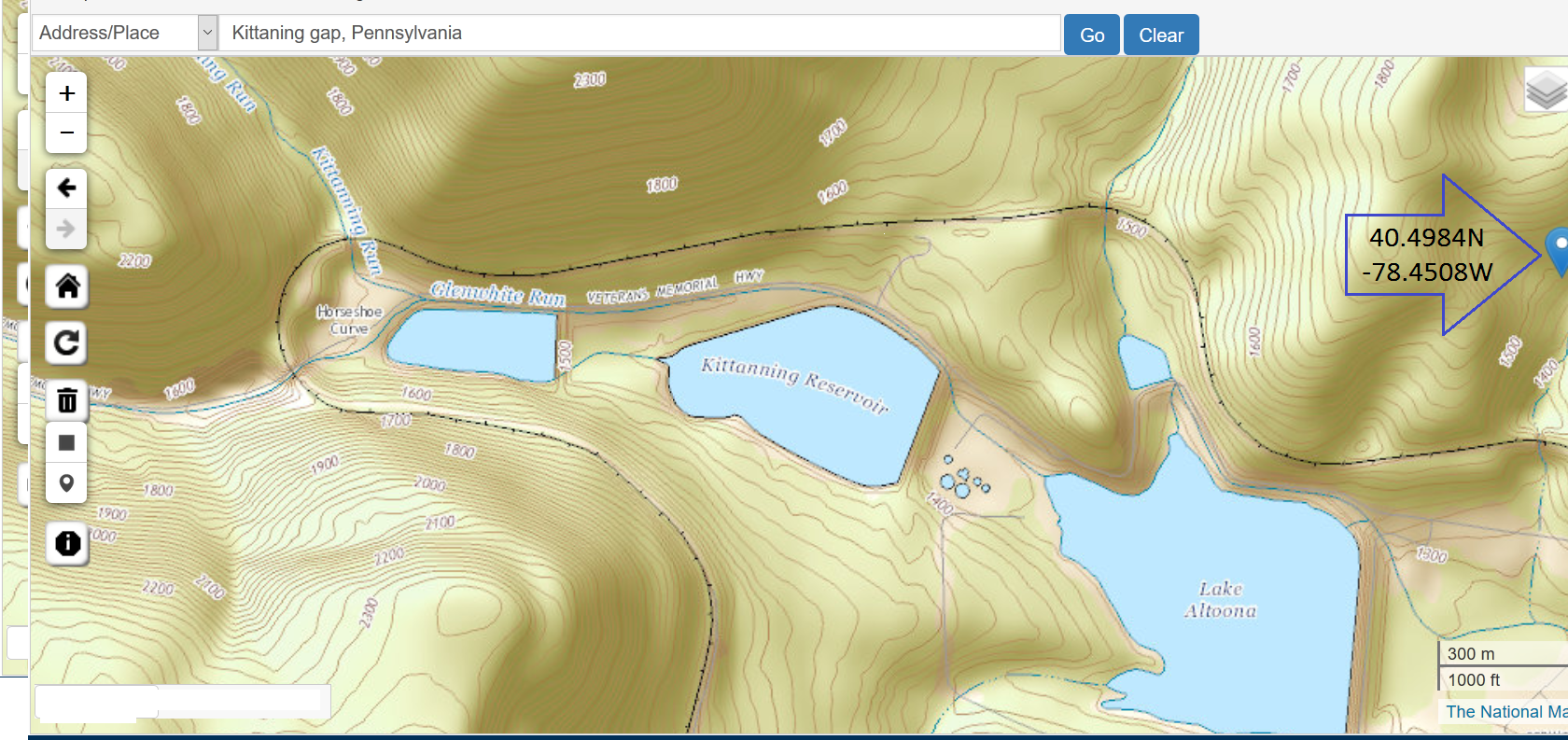
Location of Kittanning Gap, along a tributary of the Kittanning Run.

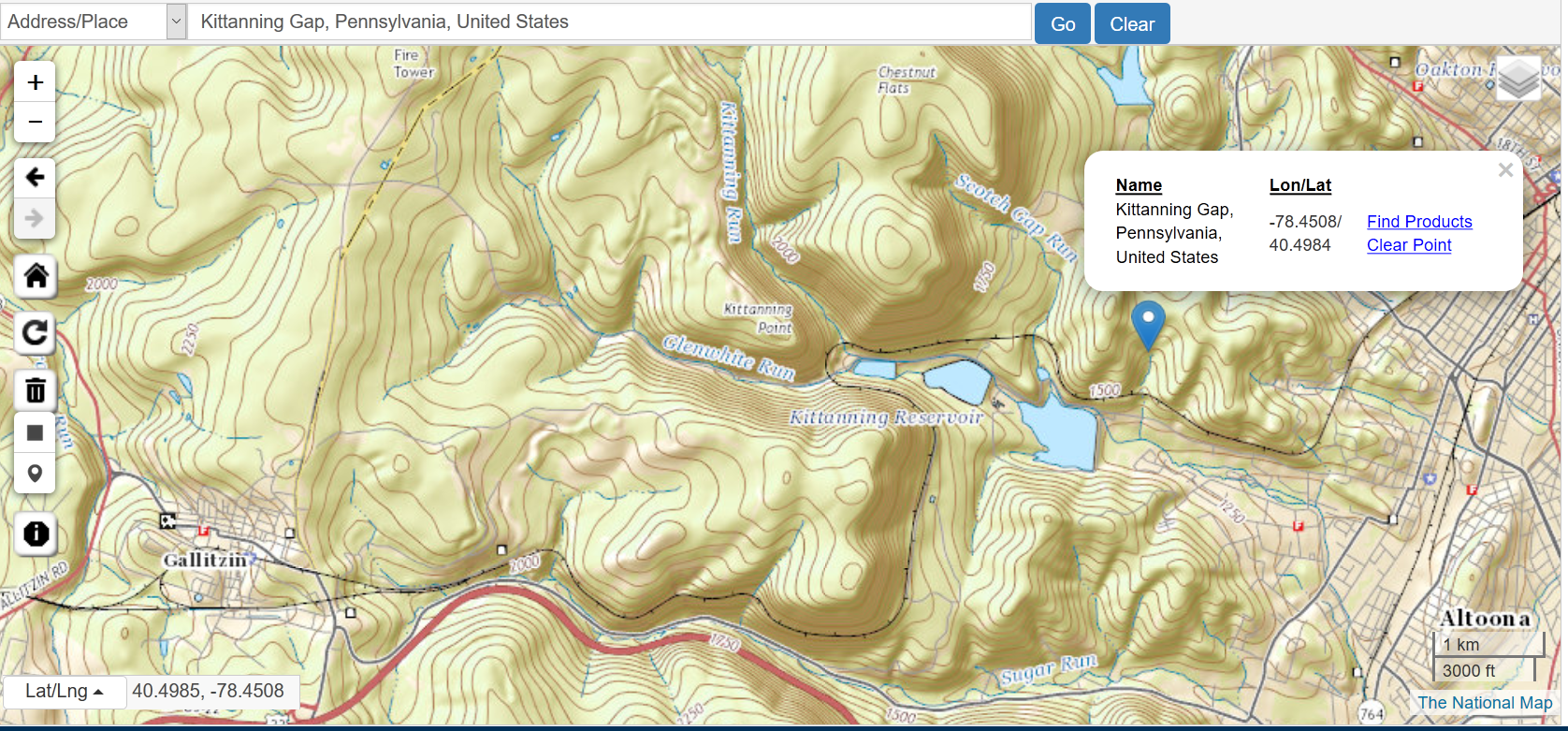
Location of Kittanning Gap.

The Kittanning Run is one of the several streams draining the Allegheny Plateau, each one cutting an abrupt valley, one of the gaps of the Allegheny— one of several climbing valleys used for centuries by the Amerindian native peoples to pass East-to-West through the Allegheny Front escarpment, a barrier ridge separating the flat highlands plateau, the Appalachian Plateau—from the many barrier ridges making up the local Ridge-and-Valley Appalachians in the Central Pennsylvania heartland.

The stream was very likely followed by the Kittanning Path connecting the Indian communities west of the Alleghenies, especially Kittanning Village with the large Indian settlements in the Susquehanna Valley and points east though the naming of the divergent run up through the Kittanning Gap suggests settlers may have bent the trail up to the plateau along a wider shallower grade, perhaps more suitable to settlers carts and Conestoga wagons migrating west.

Unlike the Pennsylvania Canal System which built the Allegheny Portage Railroad for the 1845 railroad line chartered (ordered, in effect) to cross the Allegheny Mountains. The challenge of constructing a railroad through the ridge led to the construction of the unique Horseshoe Curve in 1854, once trumpeted as the world's busiest railway, and now designated as a National Historic Landmark.

== History ==
In the 18th century the Kittanning Path passed through the gap, providing a route between central and western Pennsylvania for Native Americans and early white settlers. Why the gap is left of the Kittanning Run can only be speculated upon, but a topographical examination suggests for 16th-19th century peoples on foot or pulling a cart or Conestoga wagon, turning right up the gap would lead them across gentler climbing terrains, so may have been the path of choice up onto the tableland above versus the climbs along either bigger stream.
