= Kittanning Path =

Native American trail in Pennsylvania, USA

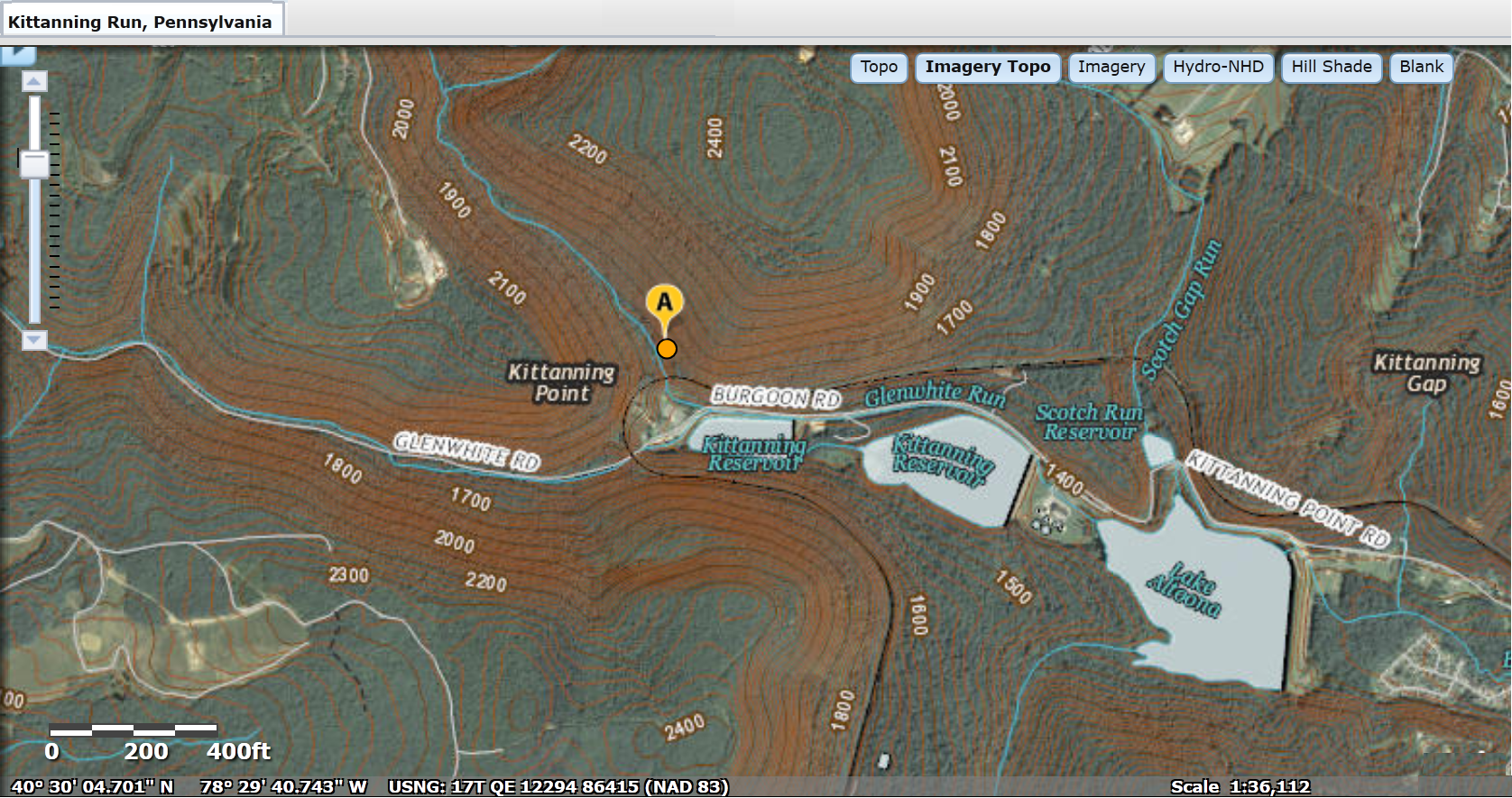
USGS combined Topo and relief map image of the Kittanning Point promontory looming above and overshadowing the valley and streams below, directly west and above the confluence of Kittanning Run (denoted by the yellow circle labeled 'A') and Glenwhite Run (the major right branch stream to the north of the reservoirs).: Foot travelers could follow either large stream or the smaller stream in the Kittanning Gap (lower down, at image right), or one of the several gaps of the Allegheny (to the south of this view) which were exploited by the Allegheny Portage Railroad or the Penn Central Railroad. Mule trains of Trappers could take steeper ravines than westward migrating white settlers with animal power towed vehicles such as Wagons and carts.; Each 'gap of the Allegheny Front' was one likely road for Amerindian and fur traders foot traffic to cross the Allegheny Front into the Allegheny Valley and reach the native settlement at Kittanning Village or beyond. Various gaps climb faster (steeper) or slower to the highland 700–900 feet (210–270 m) above.; The terrains above the front are part of the Appalachian Plateau, which presents as a larger-than-county sized region of low hills and small creeks, topped by the eastern continental divide.

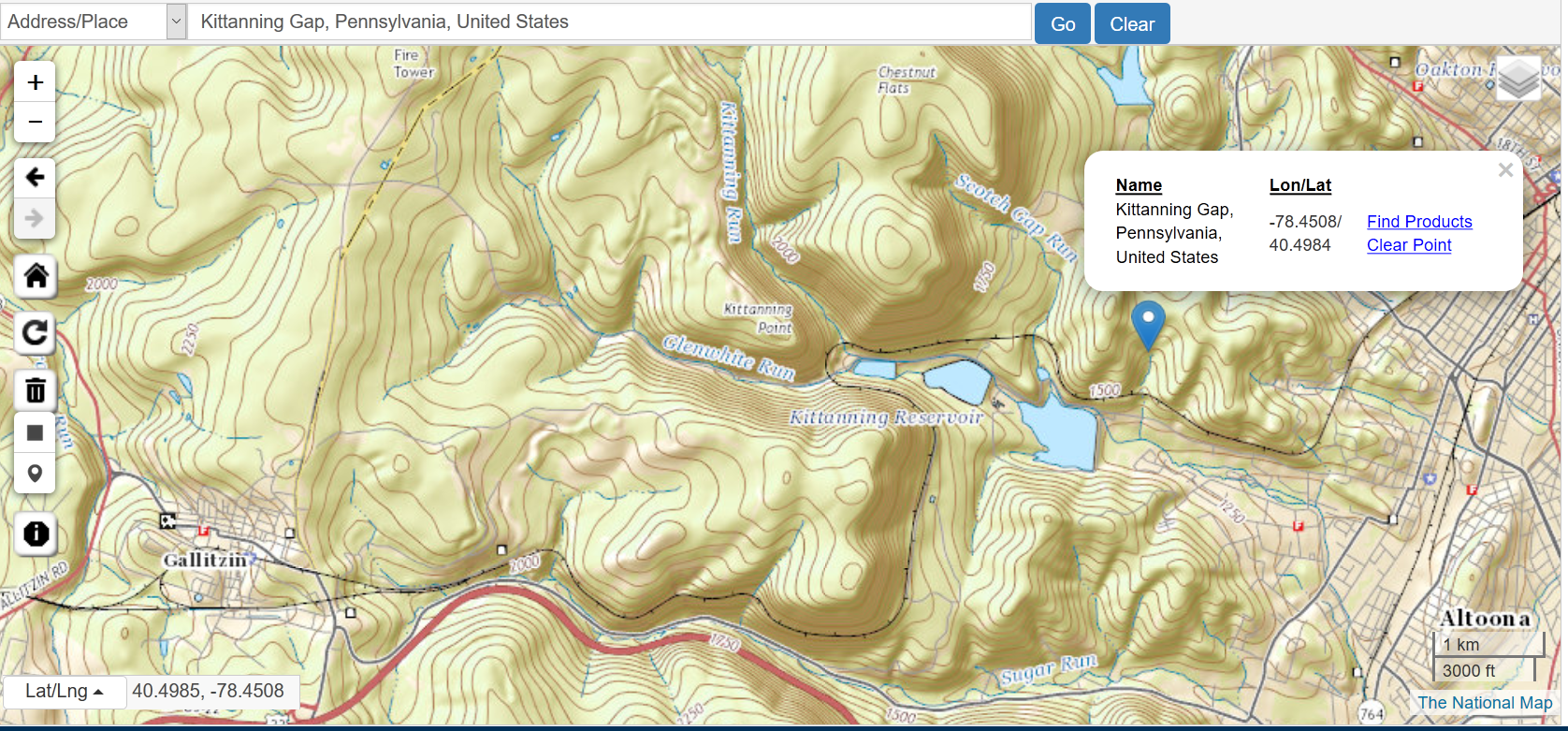
Location of Kittanning Gap after GNIS finding of 'Kittanning Gap, Pennsylvania' seen in USGS National Map viewer screenshot. The gap is located effectively in a western suburb of Altoona, PA.: The maps on this page also are showing the nearby PRR Horseshoe Curve, which crosses three other gaps, and the confluence of Kittanning Run with Glen White Run, which descends running nearly due west to east.; The Kittanning Gap gives this 'choice way' of climbing the escarpment to wagons or mule trains on the way to the west side of the Allegheny Mountains and Kittanning, PA along the Kittanning Path. Taking a right through the gap to climb above the escarpment by a circuitous route following a traverse across contours climbing the sides of slopes was longer, but quite a bit easier than attempting to pull farm wagons or Conestoga wagons up either of the steep narrow creek bed straight ahead... or some of the other gaps of the Allegheny Front.

The Kittanning Path was a major east-west Native American trail that crossed the Allegheny Mountains barrier ridge connecting the Susquehanna River valleys in the center of Pennsylvania to the highlands of the Appalachian Plateau and thence to the western lands beyond drained by the Ohio River. Kittanning Village was the first major Delaware (Lenape) Indian settlement along the descent from the Allegheny Plateau.

== Nature and the path ==
The path is made up of a "series of path alternatives" that pass through seasonally or directionally more or less difficult notches (Note: a succession of water gap valleys in the same upland region known as the gaps of the Allegheny cut in the edge of the plateau by the small streams which gather hundreds of feet below into tributary brooks of the West Branch Susquehanna River.)— the gaps were among only five places that could be crossed by animal power from east to west across the Appalachian Mountains west of New England. The Kittanny path (by other names (Note: The name of the Kittanny Path would be shaped as British colonials encroached on remnant eastern coastal Indian tribes, resulting in a westward migration of the Delaware people across the heartland of their vanished rival, the Susquehannock, into the west beyond the Alleghenies. This area had been emptied of tribes by internecine Amerindian wars prior to the advent of the first Dutch and French traders and explorers to enter the continent (after 1600). By the time of the 1750s, leading into the French and Indian War, the Kittany path had supported a westward migration of Delaware peoples for decades. One of their major towns west of the Appalachian ridge was known as Kittanning Village by whites, who gradually called these routes the Kittanning Path.)) would also come to be used first by Dutch, then English and British colonial fur traders, as well as Amerindian emigrants moving westwards before and after the French and Indian War and in the post-1780 (Note: The Sullivan Expedition (1779) broke the power of the Iroquois, who had previously defeated the power of the few remaining non-Iroquois in the Allegheny and upper Ohio valleys. Some Colonials had moved west even before the war, and the migration increased after the Revolution.) settlers migrations west of the Mountain as the American Revolution entered its final years.

For centuries the Kittanning Path, like the similar Chief Nemacolin's Trail to the south, was the overland route through very tough country (Note: These heavily forested mountains were virgin stands of mostly hardwoods, with trunk diameters starting above 34 in (86 cm)&mdash. Such girths are rarely seen in trees in the 21st century outside deep wilderness. In the 1600s-1840s the Appalachians were covered by such trees from upstate Maine to Northern Georgia.) for Native American peoples. They included Iroquoian-speaking tribes, such as the Erie, Susquehannock, and the Five Nations of the Iroquois confederacy, as well as the Algonquian-speaking Lenape, Miami, and Siouan Shawnee. Early European explorers and settlers also learned to use the Indian paths to cross the Allegheny Mountains barrier ridge.

The path made use of one of the few so-called gaps of the Allegheny that accompanied the feedwater streams draining into the Juniata River, a tributary of the Susquehanna. The path terminated on the Allegheny River due Northeast of Pittsburgh in what is now Armstrong County, Pennsylvania at the Native American Kittanning Village (at present-day Kittanning, Pennsylvania).

By the time of the French and Indian War, starting in 1754, Kittanning Village was believed by Europeans to be the largest Native American village in the Ohio Country west of the Alleghenies. It was located in an area of Pennsylvania that had been closed to white settlement by the original treaty of William Penn with the Lenape.

In an attempt to settle frontier borders and reduce conflict among Indian tribes, the English and Native Americans signed the Treaty of Fort Stanwix after the French and Indian War. It opened some of Pennsylvania west of the Alleghenies to white settlement. In the 1750s, this area had been the scene of a fierce raids by Native Americans against white settlement, and a major British retribution campaign.

A section of the original path is preserved in northwestern Cambria County.

== Description (East to West) ==
It began southeast of Altoona at Frankstown on the Juniata River. It ran west, crossing the Allegheny Ridge approximately 5 mi (8 km) west of Altoona at Kittanning Gap, later the location of the Horseshoe Curve railroad site.

The path ran northwest through Cambria County, passing east of Carrolltown. It entered Indiana County approximately 1 mi (1.6 km) south of Cherry Tree at "Canoe Place", the uppermost Native American canoe portage on the West Branch of the Susquehanna.

It followed a southwest course, through Yellow Creek State Park, then along the headwaters of Two Lick Creek, roughly past Uniontown, Pennsylvania (not the current Uniontown), Cookport, and Diamondville to U.S. Highway 422. It followed the approximate present course of the highway west and NNW through Indiana to Shelocta. It crossed into Armstrong County near Elderton and ended at the village of Kittanning on the east bank of the Allegheny.

== History ==
The path was in use as early as 1721. In 1744 the English trader John Hart was granted a license by colonial authorities to trade with the Indians in western Pennsylvania lands, which were then closed to white settlement. Hart established a way station campsite, called Hart's Sleeping Place, near the continental divide in Cambria County. The way station appeared on colonial maps and was used in 1752 by Gov. James Hamilton, and in 1754 by John Harris, the founder of Harrisburg. The last Native American encampment was recorded at the site in 1781.

In the 1750s the path became the raiding route taken by Lenape. Unhappy with a treaty that took away much of their land rights in western Pennsylvania, they raided white settlements in central Pennsylvania. In 1755, the Lenape chief Shingas used the trail to attack British settlements along the Juniata River, returning with captives to the village of Kittanning. In early August 1756, the Lenape used the path for a raid to burn Fort Granville near present-day Lewistown, when they also took prisoners.

After the fort was burned, the British dispatched Lt. Colonel John Armstrong for retaliation. He pursued the Lenape along the path and camped at Canoe Place in early September; he continued to the village of Kittanning, which he destroyed on 8 September. Armstrong earned the accolade among British colonials as "the Hero of Kittanning" for the raid. He later served as a Major General for the United States in the American Revolutionary War and was elected to the Second Continental Congress.

The path was also traveled by early German pioneer Conrad Weiser, who was accompanied by William Franklin, the son of Benjamin Franklin. Weiser recorded the journey in his journal.

The Kittanning Path is not to be confused with the Kittanning Road, which was built by American rebel forces in 1779 during the Sullivan Expedition. The Kittanning Road followed a more northerly course, running from Kittanning to the site of what is now Olean, New York.

== Preservation ==
The trail has been surveyed by historians through Cambria County. An authentic section of the original trail is preserved near Eckenrode Mill east of Carrolltown.

== See also ==
- Natchez Trace
- Nemacolin's Path
- Gaps of the Allegheny
- Cumberland Narrows
- Cumberland Gap
