= Gaps of the Allegheny =

Series of valleys in Pennsylvania, US

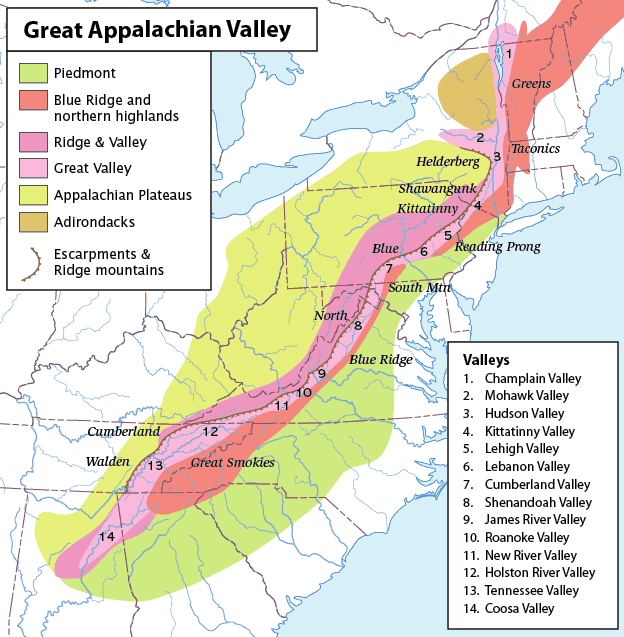
The barrier ridge of the Appalachian Mountain chain extends from New England to Georgia, and Alabama. Some of the local names, such as the Alleghenies for parts of the chain are marked; others are labeled on other maps on this page. Through the Appalachians west of the Berkshires, there were just five openings allowing east to west animal-powered travel within the United States up until the 1930s, (Note: Writing in 'Historic Indian Paths of Pennsylvania' in 1952, a preliminary study report to the Pennsylvania and Museum Commission on the state of his research under the direction of the State Historian S.K. Stevens, author Paul A. W. Wallace) giving emphasis as to the importance of the three interiors mountain passes like the Gaps of the Allegheny Ridge.

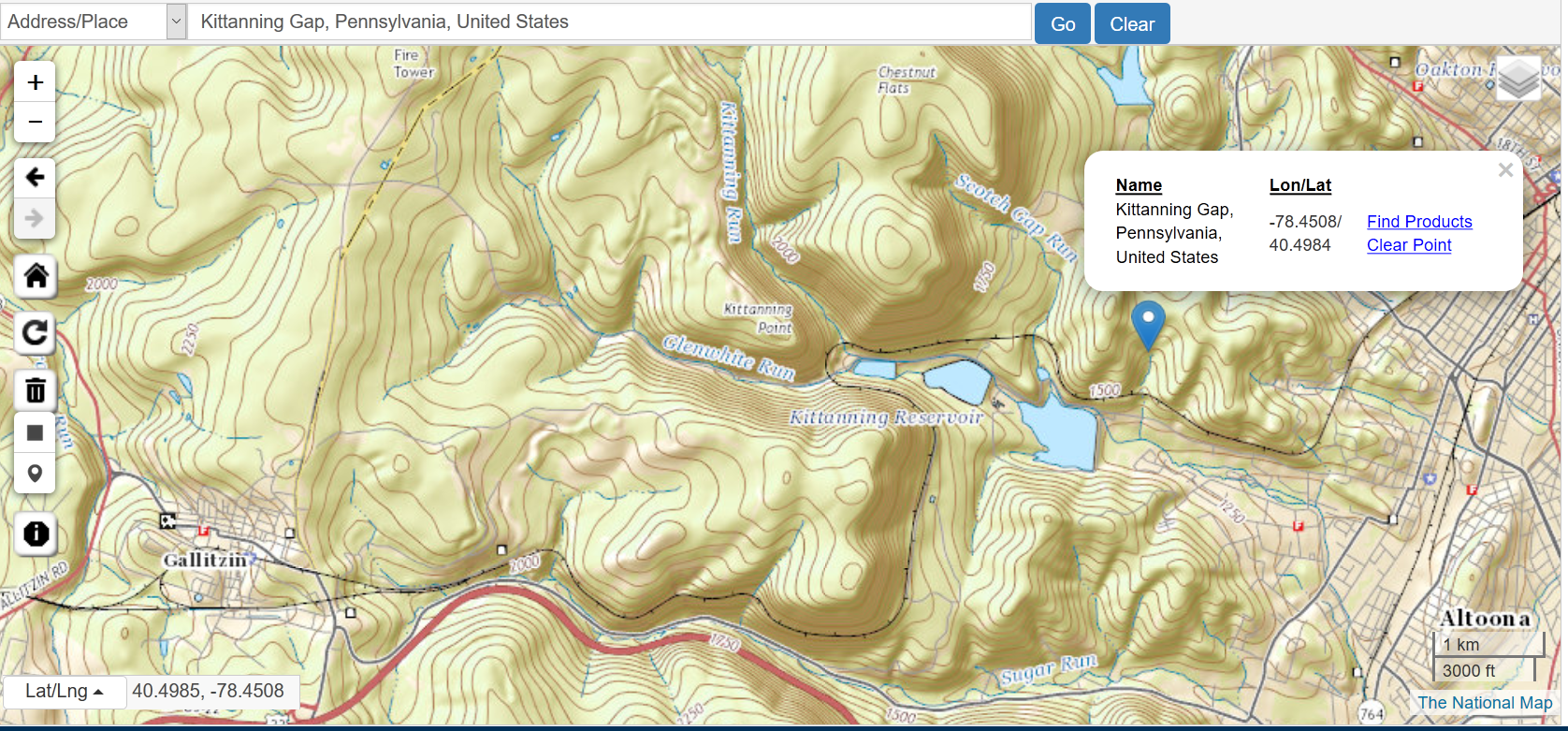
Location of Kittanning Gap after GNIS finding of 'Kittanning Gap, Pennsylvania' seen in USGS National Map viewer screenshot. The gap is located effectively in a western suburb of Altoona. • The maps on this page also are showing the nearby PRR Horseshoe Curve which crosses watercourses cutting three other gaps. GNIS software shows the Gap with the indicated 'A' marker well below the mouth of Kittanning Run. • The Kittanning Gap name likely signifies a 'choice way' of climbing the escarpment to wagons or mule trains on the way to the west side of the Allegheny Mountains and Kittanning, PA. Taking a right through the gap to climb up the escarpment was a bit easier than either steep narrow creek beds straight ahead. This was one alternative routing through the area along what the 19th century would call the Kittanning Path.

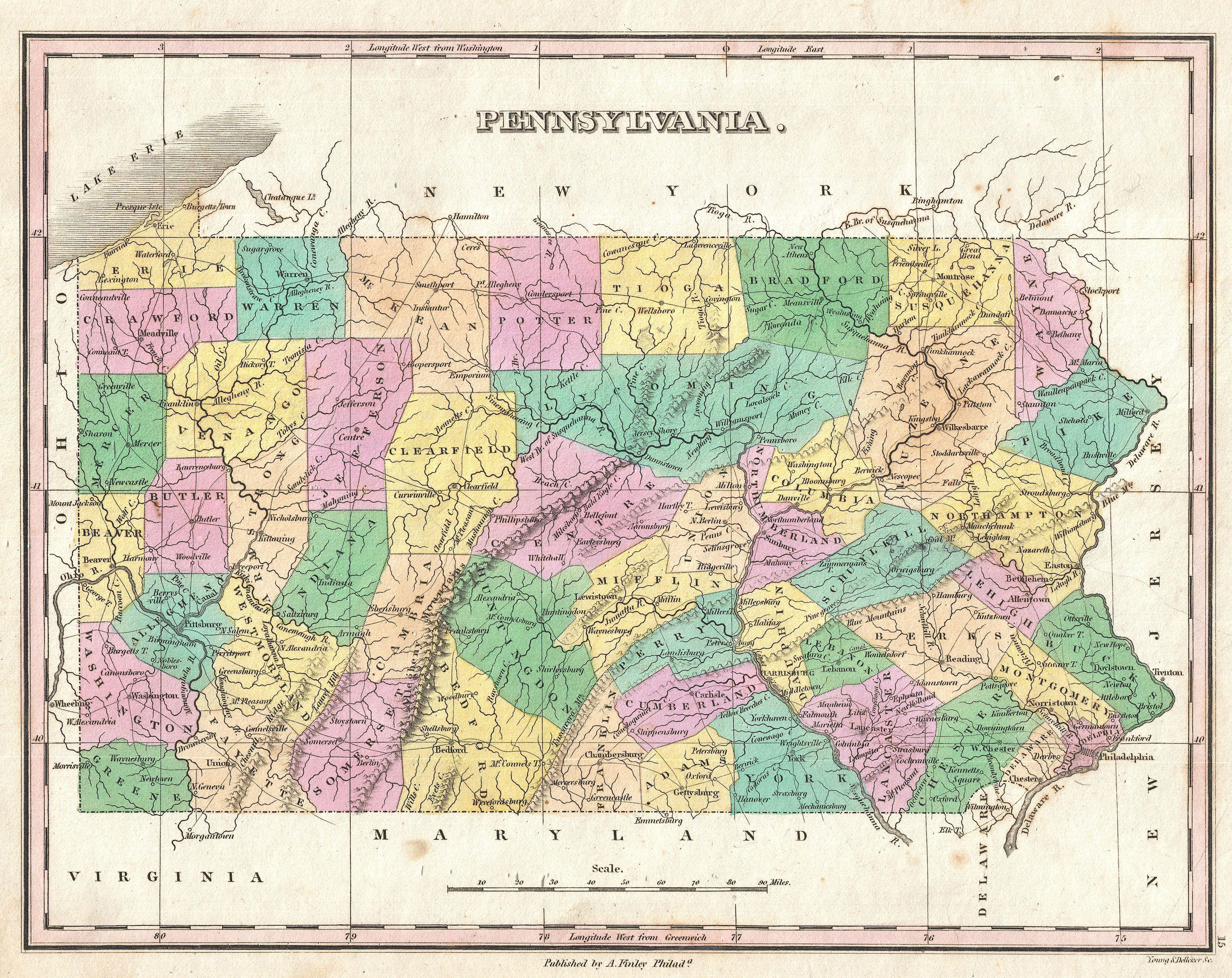
This 1827 map shows the political map, the main water courses, and their relation to the key barrier ridges as seen by a reputed cartographer preparing this official map in the early years of the Main Line of Public Works (1824). The Allegheny Ridge is prominently shown in the map center-left, the gaps of the Allegheny Front are located in the border area between Cambria County (uplands) and Huntingdon County (lowlands).

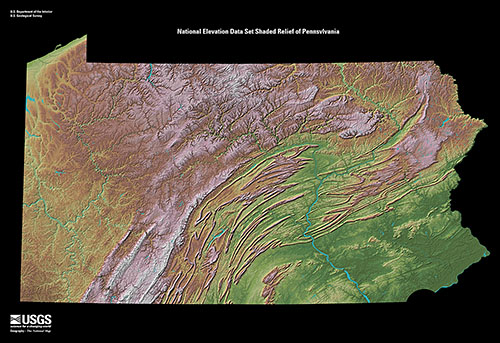
USGS - Appalachians Mountain chain showing the lines of the barrier ridges in central, western, and northwestern Pennsylvania. Counting the Hudson Valley north of the Catskills in New York and the southern end of the chain on the Georgian plains, there are exactly three narrow areas where water gaps allowed climbing up to mountain passes allowing passage across the mountains was possible to animal pulled transport vehicles.

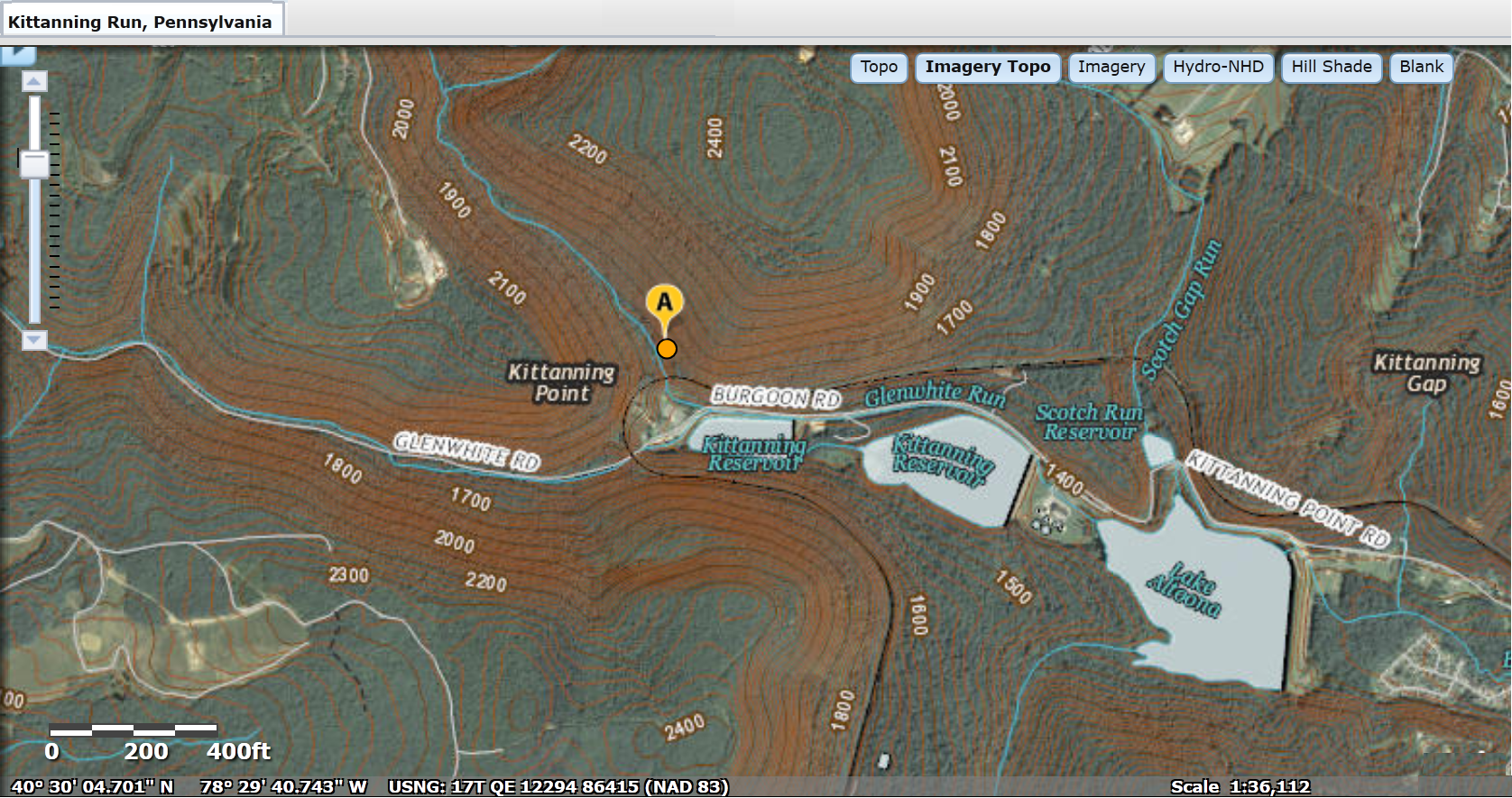
USGS combined topological and relief map mode view with search object "Kittanning Run". The Web software identifies the search item with short yellow point icon containing the 'A' (circled). This "official USGS confluence" is several miles from the official USGS Kittanning Gap; the dark trace forming a hairpin turn directly below the marker is the Pennsylvania Railroad's famous Horseshoe Curve.

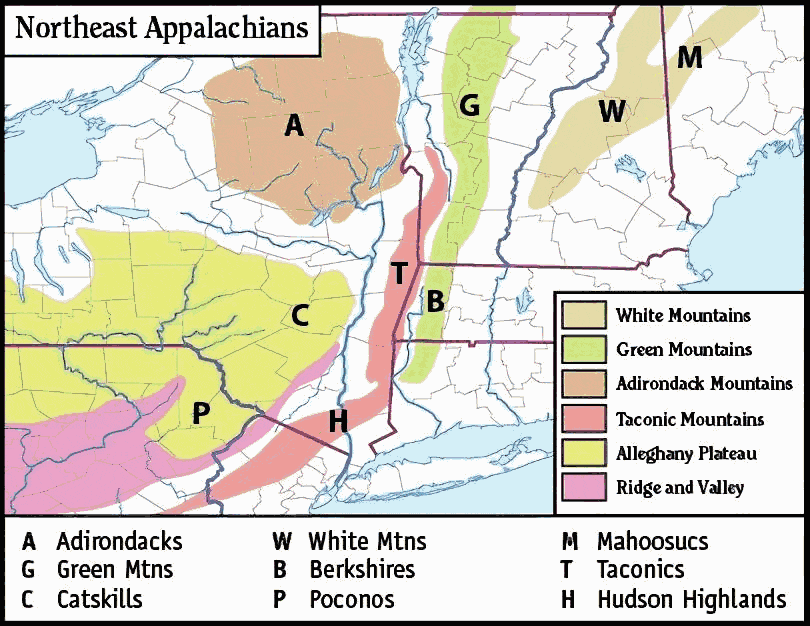
A closer look at the Appalachians and regional subordinate mountain ranges across New York State and New England.

USGS - Appalachians Mountain chain geomorphological classification zones in the Eastern United States.

The gaps of the Allegheny, meaning gaps in the Allegheny Ridge (now given the technical name Allegheny Front) in west-central Pennsylvania, is a series of escarpment eroding water gaps (notches or small valleys) along the saddle between two higher barrier ridge-lines in the eastern face atop the Allegheny Ridge or Allegheny Front escarpment. The front extends south through Western Maryland and forms much of the border between Virginia and West Virginia, in part explaining the difference in cultures between those two post-Civil War states. While not totally impenetrable to daring and energetic travelers on foot, passing the front outside of the water gaps with even sure-footed mules was nearly impossible without navigating terrain where climbing was necessary on slopes even burros would find extremely difficult.

The gaps, formed by small streams, provide several usable incline planes, or ramps, connecting the eastern river valley lowlands to the highlands atop the plateau to the west and north, that would otherwise have been unnavigable by animal powered wagons before the mid-1930s. As the map at right indicates, there were but five ways west from the eastern seaboard (colonies) to beyond the Appalachians barrier ridges. The gaps in the Allegheny, all west of present-day Hollidaysburg and Altoona, are by Hurlbert grouped as part of the Kittanning Gorge, with the eponymous name borrowed from the Lenape (Delaware nation, once centered in the Delaware Valley, ranging from New York Harbor to the northern Chesapeake, occupying the Lehigh Valley and eastern Pennsylvania, New Jersey, and Delaware), but made immigrants forced west of the Mountains into empty lands during the 18th century.

The streams cutting those various gaps either let out into the Susquehanna River tributaries, the Juniata River, or the West Branch of the Susquehanna, so gave the rich Pennsylvania Dutch country access to the interior and the ramp-like valleys climbing to the divide, as did the Main Branch of the Susquehanna and its tributaries climbing to the ridges overlooking both the Hudson and the Mohawk Valleys.

Hurlbert, in his study The Paths of Inland Commerce, makes a distinction between the gaps leading up from the Susquehanna across the divide from the Allegheny River, those in between the Monongahela and the Allegheny, and those reachable across the divide between the Potomac River, and the Monongahela and the Cheat Rivers — only grouping the first batch in his usage of gaps of the Allegheny.

Traversing the line of the Alleghenies southward, the eye notes first the break in the wall at the Delaware Water Gap, and then that long arm of the Susquehanna, the Juniata, reaching out through dark Kittanning Gorge to its silver playmate, the dancing Conemaugh. Here amid its leafy aisles ran the brown and red Kittanning Trail, the main route of the Pennsylvania traders from the rich region of York, Lancaster, and Chambersburg. On this general alignment the Broadway Limited flies today toward Pittsburgh and Chicago.

A little to the south another important pathway from the same region [i.e. Susquehanna basin] led, by way of Carlisle, Bedford, and Ligonier, to the Ohio. The "Highland Trail" the Indian traders called it, for it kept well on the watershed dividing the Allegheny tributaries on the north from those of the Monongahela on the south.

Farther to the south the scene shows a change, for the Atlantic plain widens considerably. The Potomac River, the James, the Pedee, and the Savannah flow through valleys much longer than those of the northern rivers. Here in the South commerce was carried on mainly by shallop and pinnace. The trails of the Indian skirted the rivers and offered for trader and explorer passageway to the West, especially to the towns of the Cherokees in the southern Alleghanies or Unakas; but the waterways and the roads over which the hogsheads of tobacco were rolled (hence called "rolling roads") sufficed for the needs of the thin fringes of population settled along the rivers.

Trails from Winchester in Virginia and Frederick in Maryland focused on Cumberland at the head of the Potomac. Beyond, to the west, the fingertips of the Potomac interlocked closely with the Monongahela and Youghiogheny, and through this network of mountain and river valley, by the "Shades of Death" and Great Meadows, coiled Nemacolin's Path to the Ohio. Even today this ancient route is in part followed by the Baltimore and Ohio and the Western Maryland Railway.

== Etymology ==
The terms gaps of the Allegheny and the formal geology term, the Allegheny Front, are from two different disciplines. The former is used by historians (most often) describing the local measures taken during the French and Indian War and Native American territories before the United States Constitution, or discussing the transport network east to west before the 1930s depression's public works projects drove hundreds of roads into and through the mountains years after wagon road turnpikes established corporate through-ways that generally went out of business with the rise of railroads.

These low water gaps of the Allegheny are located in an arc in the depression between higher barrier ridge-lines, a family or succession of half-mountain passes letting out in a similar series of water courses, albeit rising more gradually from the west, where the depressed upland was caused by the weight of the immense plateau glacier that flattened the Appalachian Plateau long ago. In the days before academia formed committees to standardize terms, place names were generally applied locally, copied by the USGS making regional maps, and in that era the last escarpment rising to the Allegheny Plateau was generally known as Allegheny Mountain or the Allegheny Ridge or just The Allegheny. The modern term of art, the Allegheny Front, was coined by physical geologists and other earth scientists interested in geomorphology reasoning out the processes that make one landscape terrain different from another in time, cause and space.

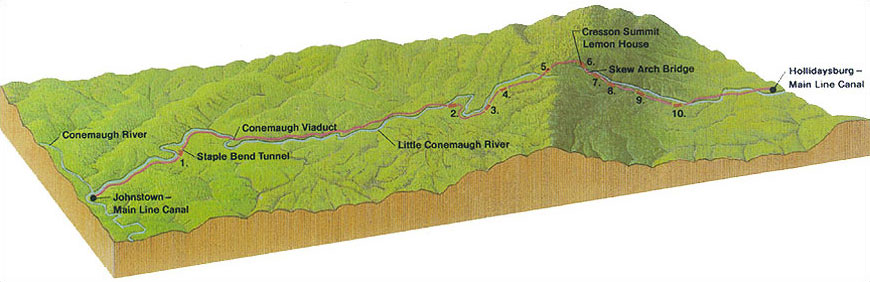
This profile of the Allegheny Portage Railroad crossing the Allegheny Front gives valuable perspective at how the escarpment of the front and steepness of the gaps of the Allegheny created the final barrier range preventing easy settlement of the colonial and post-revolutionary-war west (today's Mid-west). It also illustrates the upland nature of the western side of the Front, the Allegheny Plateau but less clearly demonstrates the general barrier range nature of the other ridgelines of the Ridge-and-Valley Appalachians.

== Greater geology ==
The geology of the curious ridge and valley formations are the remnants of an ancient fold-and-thrust belt, west of the mountain core that formed in the Alleghenian orogeny (Stanley, 421–2). Here, strata have been folded westward, and forced over massive thrust faults; there is little metamorphism, and no igneous intrusion. (Stanley, 421–2) The ridges represent the edges of the erosion-resistant strata, and the valleys portray the absence of the more erodible strata.

Smaller streams have developed their valleys following the lines of the more easily eroded strata but for a few water gaps. (Note: Smaller streams cutting the Ridge and Valley Appalachians in Pennsylvania are east to west, the Lehigh River, the Little Schuylkill River, the Schuylkill River, the Juniata River and Clearfield Creek.) But a few major rivers, such as the Delaware River, the Susquehanna River, the New River, and the Potomac River, are evidently older than the present mountains, having cut water gaps that are perpendicular to hard strata ridges. The evidence points to a wearing down of the entire region (the original mountains) to a low level with little relief, so that major rivers were flowing in unconsolidated sediments that were unaffected by the underlying rock structure. Then the region was uplifted slowly enough that the rivers were able to maintain their course, cutting through the ridges as they developed.

Valleys may be synclinal valleys or anticlinal valleys.

These mountains are at their highest development in central Pennsylvania, a phenomenon termed the Pennsylvania climax.

== History ==
In their wanderings, man and beast alike sought the heights, the passes that pierced the mountain chains, and the headwaters of navigable rivers. On the ridges the forest growth was lightest and there was little obstruction from fallen timber; rain and frost caused the least damage by erosion; and the winds swept the trails clear of leaves in summer and of snow in winter. Here lay the easiest paths for the heavy, blundering buffalo and the roving elk and moose and deer. Here, high up in the sun, where the outlook was unobstructed and signal fires could be seen from every direction, on the longest watersheds, curving around river and swamp, ran the earliest travel routes of the aboriginal inhabitants and of their successors, the red men of historic times. For their encampments and towns these peoples seem to have preferred the more sheltered ground along the smaller streams; but, when they fared abroad to hunt, to trade, to wage war, to seek new, material for pipe and amulet, they followed in the main the highest ways.

— Archer B. Hulbert, The Paths of Inland Commerce
CHAPTER II. The Red Man's Trail
A Chronicle of Trail, Road, and Waterway,
Volume 21 in The Chronicles of America Series

Below Canada, the geologic nature of successive barrier ridges of the Ridge and Valley Appalachians run from the valley of the Hudson, the Delaware Water Gap, down through all of northern Pennsylvania, sundering eastern and central Pennsylvania, Maryland, and North Carolina, Virginia from the eastern Great Lakes, Western Pennsylvania, West Virginia, West Kentucky, and Western Tennessee. Different gaps of the Allegheny had slopes that were more or less amenable to foot travel, pack mules, and possibly wagons, allowing Native Americans and the occasional trader, using one of the Kittanning Paths, and then, after about 1778–1780, settlers, to travel west into the relatively depopulated Ohio Country.

The gaps, like the other two major breaks inside the Appalachians barrier mountain chain, the Cumberland Narrows and Cumberland Gap well to the south, were the only ways to cross into the central lowlands of the Mississippi valley in the long decades before the railroads were born and tied the country together with steel using each as a transportation corridor ever since. Right up until the engineering projects that began with the political movement to connect cities and towns with roads better than dirt tracks in the 1920s, there simply were no ways in most areas to transit the barrier of these mountains without well developed wilderness skills.

Historically, one of the southern gaps, the Blair Gap was used for the upper sections of the Allegheny Portage Railroad, which as was authorized by the enabling acts in 1824 of Pennsylvania's Main Line of Public Works as part of the Pennsylvania Canal System which originally envisioned linking Pittsburgh to Philadelphia by canals. In the early 20th century, US Route 22 followed alongside the watercourse through that particular gap. Just to the north, the famous Horseshoe Curve built by the Pennsylvania Railroad crosses or utilizes no less than four gaps of the Alleghenies as it wends its way to cross the drainage divide in its two climb-saving tunnels built through the summit to its marshaling yard in Gallitzin, PA.

Until around the 1920s, after newly founded auto clubs gathered enough numbers for political clout to push for initiatives creating roads between towns, beside the railroads, the primary means of travel from town to town was on foot or, where hauling was needed, using wagons. There were only five ways through the Appalachians east to west: Around the south (plains or Piedmont area) in Georgia, the Cumberland Gap, (Note: The Cumberland Gap is the route explores famously by Daniel Boone from upstate North Carolina and far southern Virginia west through the gap into Kentucky and Tennessee's eastern landforms.) the Cumberland Narrows, (Note: The Cumberland Narrows is the center route of the three interior crossings. The routes rise from the Potomac River and Chesapeake Bay basin west of Cumberland, Maryland and is the gap exploited by Chief Nemacolin's Path, the Braddock Expedition, the National Pike, the Baltimore and Ohio Railroad, the Western Maryland Railway, and US Route 40 to reach the Allegheny Plateau connecting the major eastern coastal cities of Baltimore and Washington, D.C. to reach the Monongahela River in Fayette County, Pennsylvania or Wheeling, West Virginia on the Ohio River via the historic gateway towns of Uniontown and Brownsville, Pennsylvania. Alternatively, exploiting the relative flats after the main climb in Somerset County, Pennsylvania the Cumberland Narrows enables roads to jog north and descend from the plateau uplands following the watershed of the Youghiogheny River and descend to Pittsburgh. But the Youghiogheny descent also allows an easy cross-route cutting across the divide to the Allegheny valley and roads traveling upriver along the west side of the Alleghenies, connecting Maryland indirectly to the plains of the eastern Great Lakes near Erie, Pennsylvania and western New York State in the Buffalo and Rochester.) the gaps of the Allegheny Front, (Note: The terms gaps of the Allegheny and the Allegheny Front are from two different disciplines. The former used by historians describing the local measures taken during the French and Indian War and Amerindian territories before the United States Constitution.) and up the Hudson River then around the north end of the Catskills and across upstate New York, the so-called level water route to the Great Lakes.

All other transits involved difficult climbs a man on foot could only make with great difficulty, and which animal drawn transport could not. Geographically and geologically, without the large projects and engineering capabilities of the 20th century, there were exactly three internal regions where it was possible to get animal powered vehicles from the east side to the west side of the Appalachian Mountains, making five routes overall counting traveling around the plains at either end of the western chain.

Elsewhere, the mountains were pierced by various local and state roads during the public works projects of the Great Depression years sponsored by the Works Progress Administration in the 1930s, when and where large edifices were not needed; and where major engineering works were needed, these roads taken for granted so much today could not be constructed until capital and the 20th century technologies such as bulldozers, steam shovels, and steel bridges became available and politically necessary. These new roads, now all less than 100 years old so young in terms of geography, would greatly diminish awareness of how important the three bottleneck passes were through the mountains or the influence of the routes around the two ends.

== List of Gaps ==
The official USGS Geographic Name Identification System (GNIS) assigns the following names and the associated data for the various gaps of the Allegheny Ridge.

=== Blair Gap ===
Blair Gap, one of the gaps of the Allegheny, is a water gap along the eastern face atop the Allegheny Ridge or Allegheny Front escarpment. Like other gaps of the Allegheny, the slopes of Blair Gap were amenable to foot travel, pack mules, and possibly wagons, allowing Native Americans, and then, after about 1778–1780 settlers, to travel west into the relatively un-populated Ohio Country decades before the railroads were born and tied the country together with steel. Historically, the gap was used for the upper sections of the Allegheny Portage Railroad, which as was authorized by the enabling acts in 1824 of Pennsylvania's Main Line of Public Works as part of the Pennsylvania Canal System which originally envisioned linking Pittsburgh to Philadelphia by canals.

=== Kittanning Gap ===
The USGS official Kittanning Gap contains at best a small spring that is most active as a spring freshet. Examination of the topology however shows that notch leads to a series of climbable traverses and was quite possibly the route of choice for wagons climbing toward the gently rolling oddly folded hill country summit and divide near the source of Clearfield Creek, Pennsylvania. Having reached that height, the travelers had also climbed the escarpment, albeit by a longer more circuitous climb than by directly assaulting one of the steeper but narrower gaps cut by more vigorous streams.

=== The gap of Kittanning Run ===
Next upstream along Glen White Run and above Kittanning Gap is the gap carved by Kittanning Run, a creek which originates in a woodland above a field in a bedroom community in Gallitzin Township, Pennsylvania at an elevation a bit over 2,400 feet (730 m).

== See also ==
- Kittanning Path
