= Kittanning Gap =

Coordinates: 40.498333°N 78.450833°W

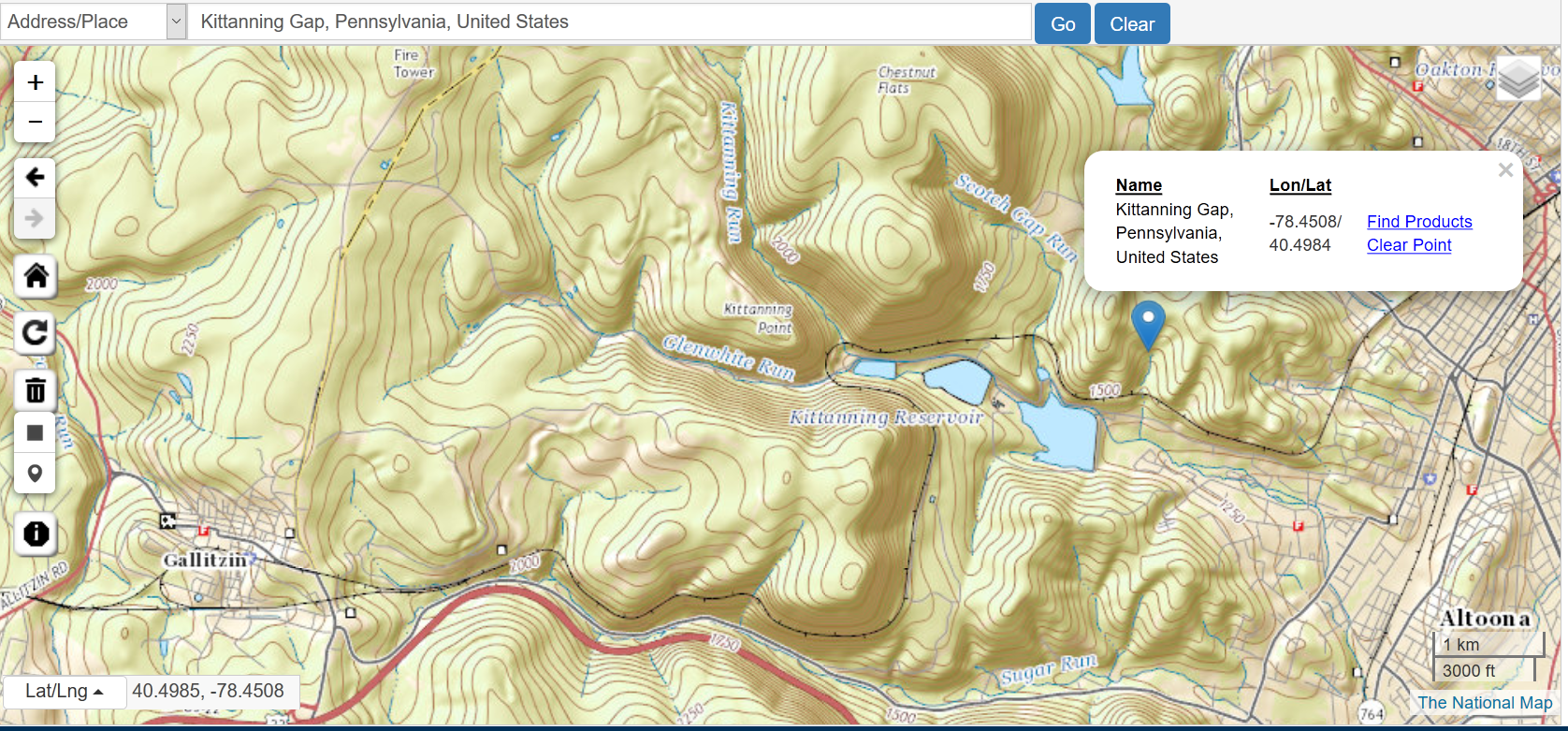
Location of Kittanning Gap after GNIS finding of 'Kittanning Gap, Pennsylvania' seen in USGS National Map viewer screenshot. The gap is located effectively in a western suburb of Altoona, PA. • The maps on this page also are showing the nearby PRR Horseshoe Curve which crosses three other gaps and the confluence of Kittanning Run with . • The Kittanning Gap gives this 'choice way' of climbing the escarpment to wagons or mule trains on the way to the west side of the Allegheny Mountains and Kittanning, PA along the Kittanning Path. Taking a right through the gap to climb up the escarpment was a bit easier than either steep narrow creek beds straight ahead..

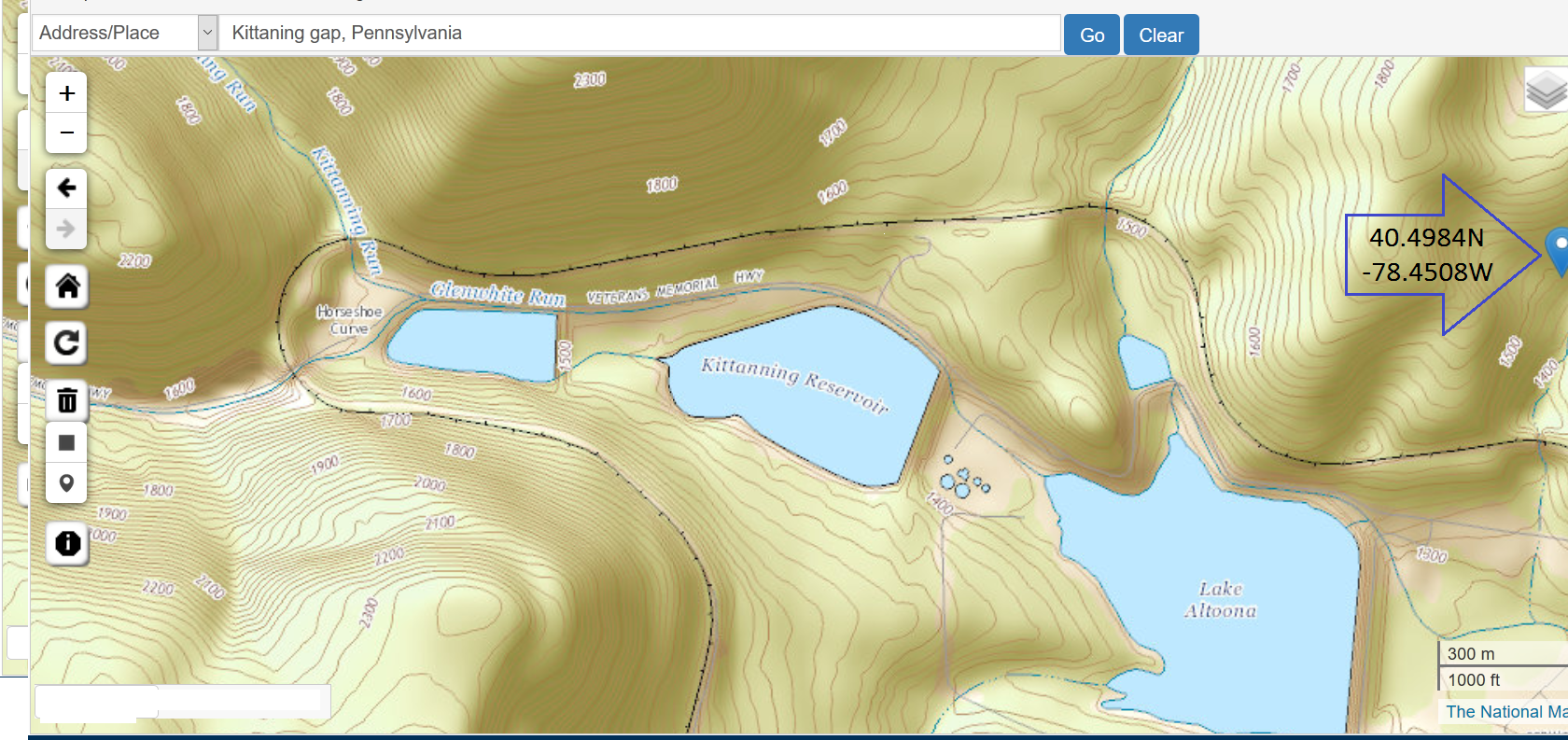
A zoomed in view of the image above showing the Location of Kittanning Gap, along a minor freshet (seasonal) tributary of the Glen White Run well below the confluence of Kittanning Run.

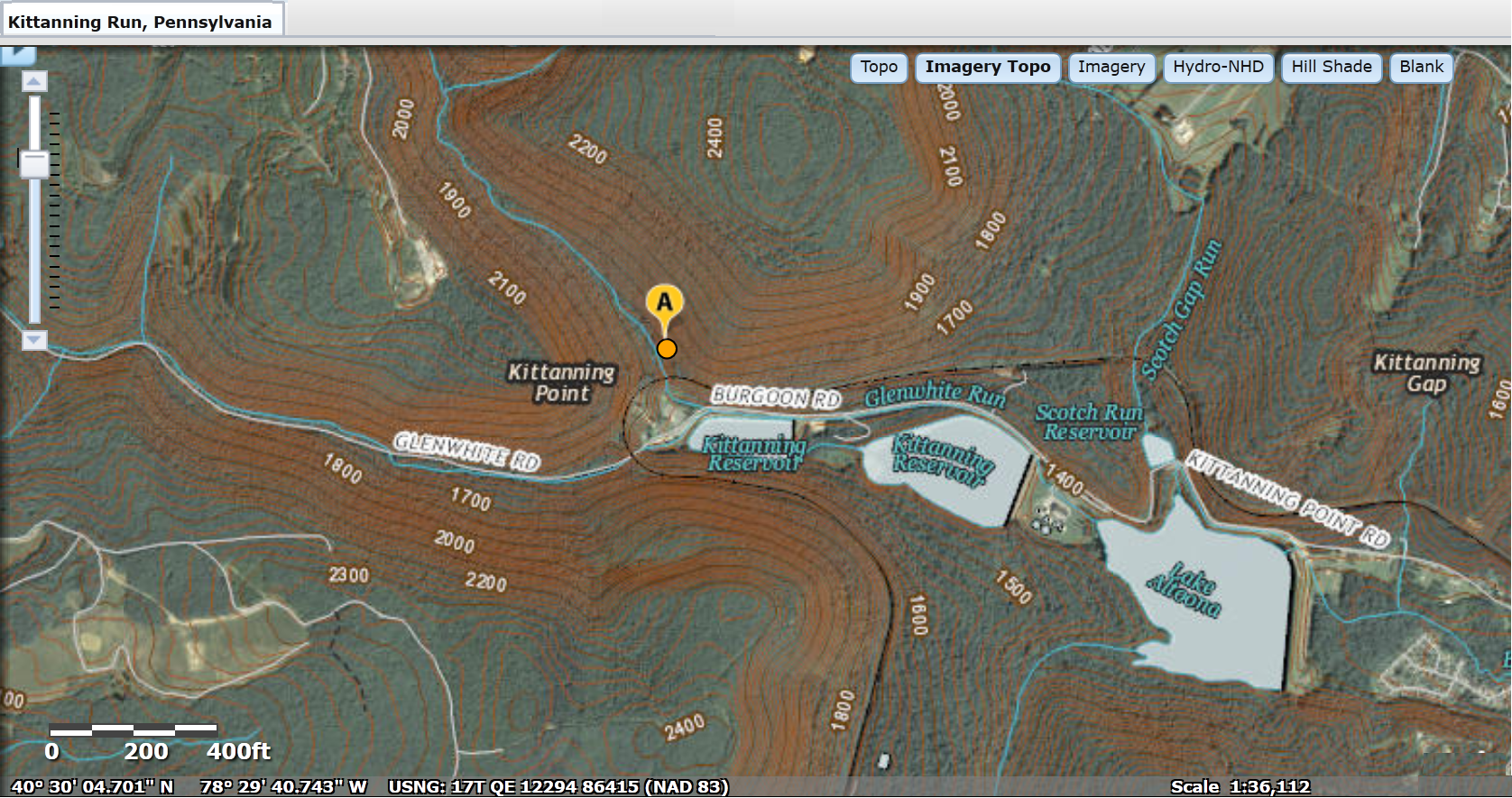
USGS combined topological and relief map mode view with search object 'Kittanning Run'. The Web software identifies the search item with short yellow point icon containing the 'A' (circled). Note that this 'official USGS confluence' is several miles from the official USGS Kittanning Gap. • The dark trace forming a hairpin turn directly below that marker is the Pennsylvania Railroad's famous Horseshoe Curve.

Kittanning Gap, one of the gaps of the Allegheny, is a now a relatively unimportant wooded ravine (water gap) along the ascent (at the foot) of the Allegheny Ridge (also called the 'Allegheny Front' or 'Allegheny escarpment') in central Pennsylvania in the United States. The gap was one of several optional paths of the Kittanning Path Amerindian trail turned into an emigrant route over the Alleghenies in the day of animal powered technology. The option up the gap was likely the 'better choice' of an ascending route for ox cart and wagon (such as those made downstream in Conestoga, Pennsylvania) encumbered white settlers pouring west across the Alleghenies escarpment.

The 1780s–1830s saw an increasing flood of emigrants into the Ohio Country and territories beyond after (and well before) (Note: An order to halt trans-Appalachian settling activities was one common cause of disenchantment with British rule after the French and Indian War. This motive was common along the frontier from Southern New York to Georgia.) the end of the American Revolution. It is located in Logan Township, Blair County, Pennsylvania just west of Altoona, PA, overlooking the former Pennsylvania Railroad trackage beginning to climb up alongside Glen White Run to the hard hairpin turn that begins at the confluence with the Kittanning Run before its famous traverse bends around in the famous Horseshoe Curve approximately 5 mi (8 km) west of Altoona.

The USGS does not use the Kittanning Run stream for an eponymous gap name since it follows local naming conventions and traditions. The Kittanning Gap is formed from the erosion valley of a seasonal freshet, so is lightly eroded compared to other gaps of the Allegheny which have larger flow volumes resulting in narrower, deeper valleys with steeper, harder to traverse walls.

However, topographical analysis shows the climb up from the Altoona Plateau up to the Allegheny Plateau through Kittanning Gap would bend first northerly then curve gradually climbing along several diverse hill sides as to path hooked back to resume a westward heading in the valley of Clearfield Creek coming out in the vicinity of Ashville, Pennsylvania but about a half-mile distant and on the opposite side of the summit that sources the Kittanning Run. In short, climbing more quickly and directly up the escarpment via either the valleys of Kittanning Run or Glen White Run was likely the route of choice (when footing was good) for foot traffic and mule trains, whilst the longer more round about but easier climb up the Kittanning Gap gave animal drawn wagon and carts the better easier path. Any one of these variations were collectively parts of the Kittanning Path as it became known.

== History ==
In the 18th century the Kittanning Path passed through the gap, providing a route between central and western Pennsylvania for Native Americans and early white settlers. Why the gap is left of the Kittanning Run can only be speculated upon, but a topographical examination suggests for 16th-19th century peoples on foot or pulling a cart or Conestoga wagon, turning right up the gap would lead them across gentler climbing terrains, so may have been the path of choice.

The lower valley of the Kittanning Path was later selected as the climbing approach for the 1845 railroad line chartered to cross the Allegheny Mountains. The challenge of constructing a railroad through the ridge led to the construction of the Horseshoe Curve in 1854, which was later designated a National Historic Landmark.
