= Bald Eagle Creek =

Bald Eagle Creek may refer to the following creeks in Pennsylvania, U.S.:

- Bald Eagle Creek (Little Juniata River tributary), in Blair County
- Bald Eagle Creek (West Branch Susquehanna River tributary), in Centre County
