= Allegheny Portage Railroad =

Railroad in central Pennsylvania, US

- U.S. National Register of Historic Places
- U.S. National Historic Landmark
- U.S. National Historic Site
- Pennsylvania state historical marker
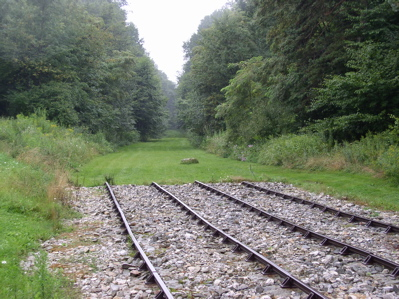
- Incline 6 Trail and Recreated Tracks

- Location within Pennsylvania Location within the United States
- Location: Blair and Cambria counties, Pennsylvania, United States
- Nearest city: Altoona, Pennsylvania, U.S.
- Coordinates: 40°27′15″N 78°32′25″W
- Area: 1,296 acres (524 ha)
- Built: 1831-1834
- Architectural style: Wood, Stone, Wrought Iron
- Visitation: 162,905 (2025)
- Website: Allegheny Portage Railroad National Historic Site
- MPS: Allegheny Portage Railroad MPS
- NRHP reference No.: 66000648

Significant dates
- Added to NRHP: October 15, 1966
- Designated NHL: December 29, 1962
- Designated PHMC: April 01, 1947

The Allegheny Portage Railroad was the first railroad constructed through the Allegheny Mountains in central Pennsylvania. It operated from 1834 to 1854 as the first transportation infrastructure through the gaps of the Allegheny that connected the midwest to the eastern seaboard across the barrier range of the Allegheny Front. About 36 miles (58 km) long overall, both ends connected to the Pennsylvania Canal, and the system was primarily used as a portage railway, hauling river boats and barges over the divide between the Ohio and the Susquehanna Rivers. Today, the remains of the railroad are preserved within the Allegheny Portage Railroad National Historic Site operated by the National Park Service.

The railroad was authorized as part of the Main Line of Public Works legislation in 1824. It had five inclines on either side of the drainage divide running athwart the ridge line from Blair Gap through along the kinked saddle at the summit into Cresson, Pennsylvania. The endpoints connected to the Canal at Johnstown on the west through the relative flats to Hollidaysburg on the east. The Railroad utilized wheeled barges to ride a narrow-gauge rail track with steam-powered stationary engines lifting the vehicles. The roadbed of the railroad did not incline monotonically upwards, but rose in relatively long, saw-toothed stretches of slightly-sloped flat terrain suitable to animal powered towing, alternating with steep cable railway inclined planes using static steam engine powered windlasses, similar to mechanisms of modern ski lifts.

Except for peak moments of severe storms, it was an all-weather, all-seasons operation. Along with the rest of the Main Works, it cut transport time from Philadelphia to the Ohio River from weeks to just 3–5 days. Considered a technological marvel in its day, it played a critical role in opening the interior of the United States beyond the Appalachian Mountains to settlement and commerce. It included the first railroad tunnel in the United States, the Staple Bend Tunnel, and its inauguration was marked with great fanfare.

== History ==
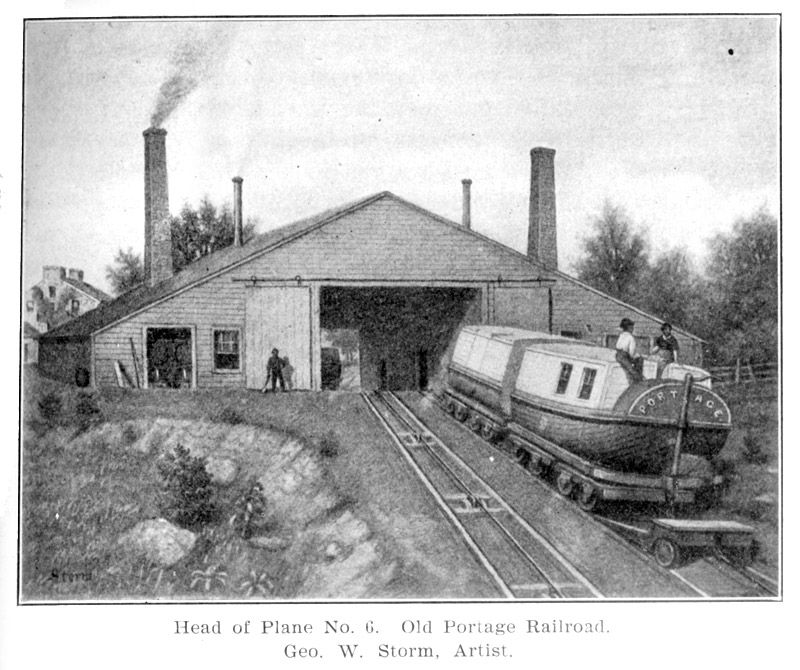
Old Portage Railroad, a drawing by George W. Storm, 1839

Construction of the Old Portage Railroad from Hollidaysburg to Johnstown, thirty six miles long, began in 1831 and took three years to complete. It included a tunnel 900 feet (274 m) long as well as a viaduct over the Little Conemaugh River upstream from Johnstown. The vertical ascent from Johnstown was 1,172 feet (357 m). The vertical ascent from Hollidaysburg was 1,399 feet (426 m). The project was financed by the Commonwealth of Pennsylvania as a means to compete with the Erie Canal in New York and the Chesapeake and Ohio Canal and Baltimore and Ohio Railroad in Maryland. The work was done largely through private contractors. The railroad utilized eleven grade lines and ten cable inclined planes, five on either side of the summit of the Allegheny Ridge, to carry loaded canal boats on flatbed railroad cars. Trains of two-three cars were pulled on grade lines by mules. On inclined planes, stationary steam engines pulled up and lowered down cars by hemp ropes switching to wire ropes in 1842.

The entire Main Line system connecting Philadelphia and Pittsburgh via the Philadelphia-Columbia railroad, the Columbia-Hollidaysburg canal, the Portage railroad linking Hollidaysburg to Johnstown, and a canal from Johnstown to Pittsburgh, was 400 miles (644 km) long. A typical ride took 4 days instead of the former 23-day horse-wagon journey. The Old Portage Railroad was in operation for twenty years being considered "the wonder of America." Charles Dickens wrote a contemporary account of travel on the railroad in Chapter 10 of his American Notes. Quoted at length in the Pennsylvania guide, Dickens "described travel on the Portage in 1842," describing aspects of the Portage Railroad's immediate social and geographic context, as well as mechanical strategies used by the Railroad for coping with the steep grades encountered on the route :

. . . Occasionally the rails were laid upon the extreme verge of a giddy precipice; and looking from the carriage window, the traveler gazes sheer down, without a stone or scrap of fence between, into the mountain depths below . . . It was very pretty travelling thus at a rapid pace along the heights of the mountains in a keen wind, to look down into a valley full of light and softness; catching glimpses, through the treetops, of scattered cabins; . . . men in their shirt sleeves, looking on at their unfinished houses, planning out tomorrow's work; and we riding onward, high above them, like a whirlwind. It was amusing, too, when we had dined, and rattled down a steep pass, having no other moving power than the weight of the carriages themselves, to see the engine, released long after us, come buzzing down alone, like a great insect, its back of green and gold so shining in the sun . . . It stopped short of us . . . when we reached the canal, and, before we left the wharf, went panting up this hill again, with the passengers who had waited our arrival for the means of traversing the road by which we had come.

— Federal Writers'Project, "Part III: Tours", Pennsylvania: A Guide to the Keystone State (1940)

In the 1850s, the Main Line of Public Works and its portage railroad was rendered obsolete by the advance of railway technology and railroad engineering. Early in 1846 the Legislature chartered the Pennsylvania Railroad (PRR) to cross the entire state in response to plans by the Baltimore and Ohio Railroad to reach the Ohio Valley through Virginia. In December 1852 trains started to run between Philadelphia and Pittsburgh shortening the travel time from 4 days to 13 hours.

Construction on the New Portage Railroad, a 40-mile realignment to cross the Allegheny Ridge bypassing inclines, started in 1851 and cost $2.14 million. The PRR raised sufficient investment and had enough quick success that they bought the existing Portage railroad and other parts of the Main Line of Public Works from the state on July 31, 1857. The PRR abandoned most of the line and used the rest as local branches; "anything of value was either sold or stripped from the Allegheny Portage Railroad."

Nearly half a century later, the graded roadbeds of the descending section east of the Gallitzin Tunnel were re-railed with standard gauge freight tracks. The line reopened as a freight bypass line in 1904.

Pennsylvania Railroad successor Conrail abandoned this line to Hollidaysburg and most of the branch trackage along the Juniata River in 1981 and removed the rails. The Allegheny Portage Railroad was designated as a National Historic Civil Engineering Landmark by the American Society of Civil Engineers in 1987.

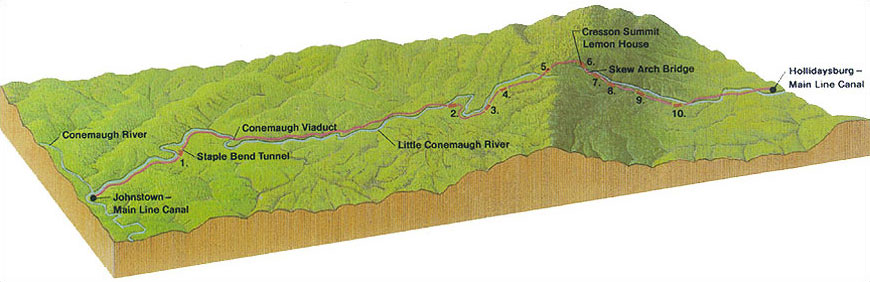
Profile of the original line of the Portage railroad from Hollidaysburg to Johnstown

== National Historic Site ==
The National Historic Site was established on 1,296 acres (524 ha) in 1964 and is about 12 miles (19.3 km) west of Altoona, in Blair and Cambria counties. The National Park Service operates a visitor center with interpretive exhibits near the old line. Nearby is the Samuel Lemon House, a tavern located alongside the railroad near Cresson that was a popular stop for railroad passengers; it has been converted into a historical museum by the National Park Service. The NPS also maintains a length of reconstructed track, an engine house with exhibits, a picnic area, and hiking trails.

A skew arch bridge, a masterwork of cut stone construction, is another feature of the site near the Lemon House. The bridge is 60.4 feet (18.4 m) long on the south elevation, 54.9 feet (16.7 m) long on the north elevation, and 22.2 feet (6.8 m) high. It was the only bridge on the line that was built to carry a road. The Staple Bend Tunnel is preserved in a separate unit of the historic site, 5 miles (8.0 km) east of Johnstown.

== Gallery ==
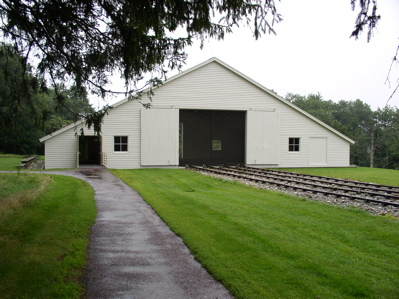
Exterior of Engine House 6 Exhibit Building

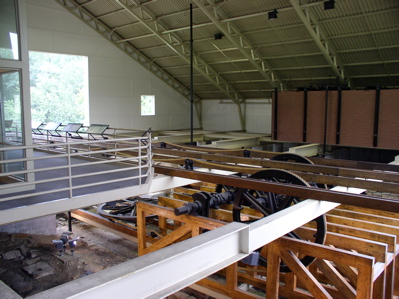
Interior of Engine House 6 Exhibit Building

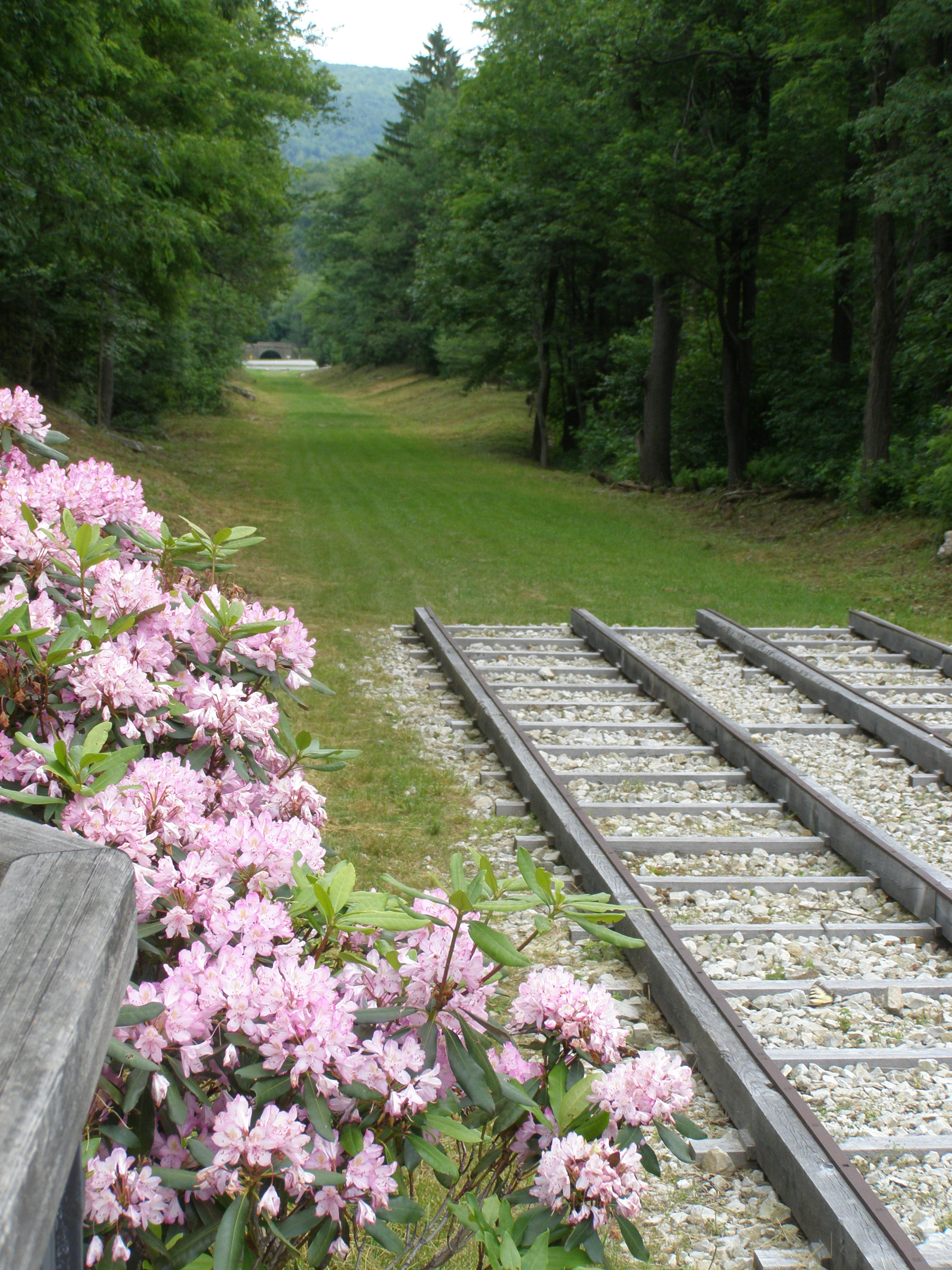
Incline looking from the Engine house

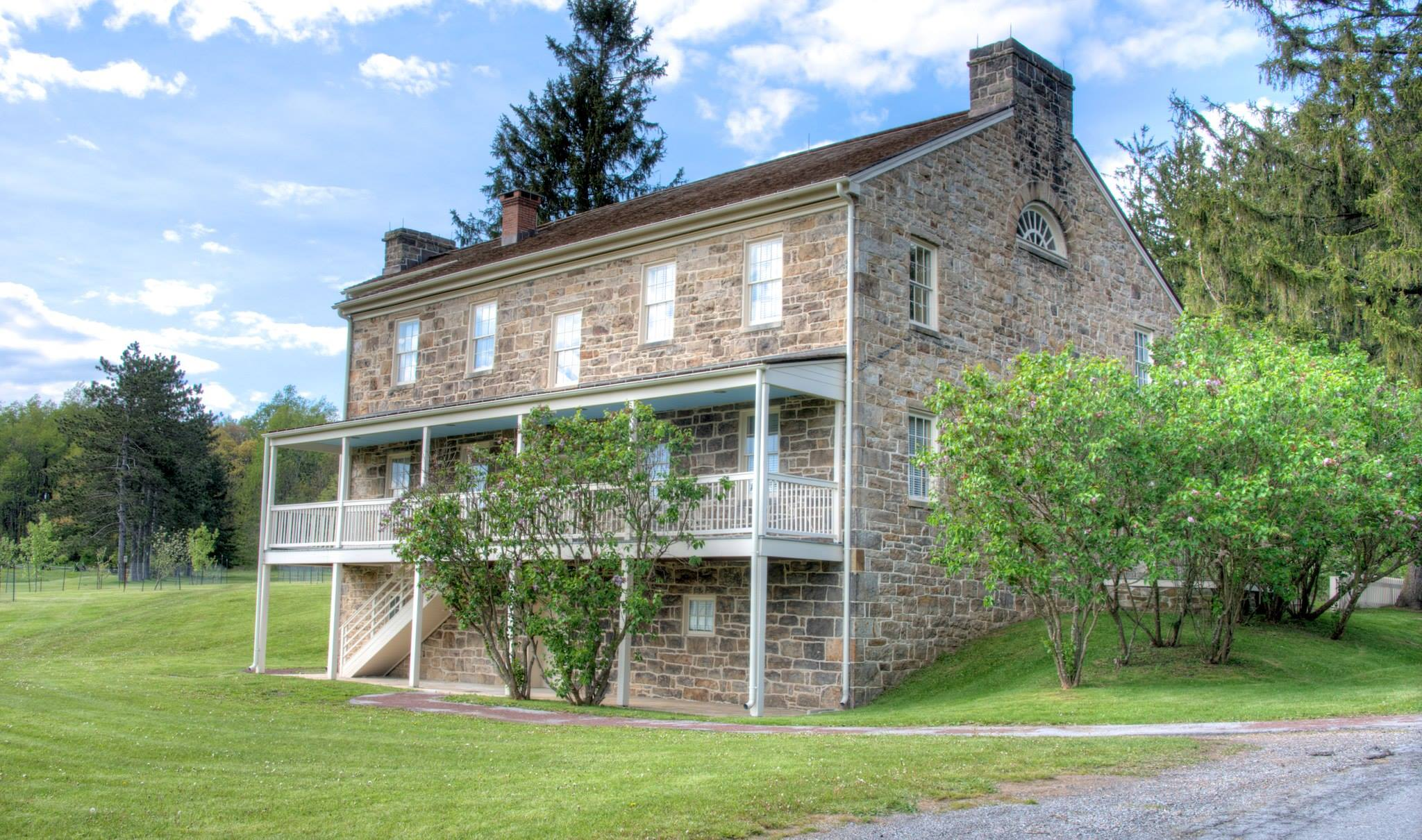
Exterior of the Lemon House

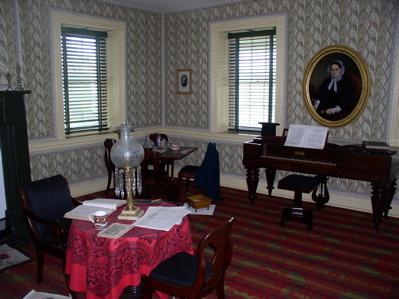
Inside the Lemon House

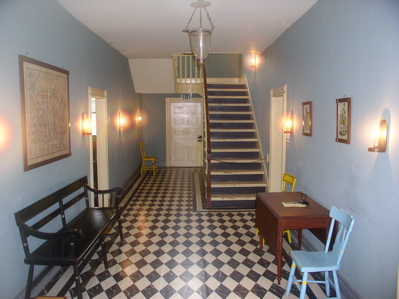
Inside the Lemon House

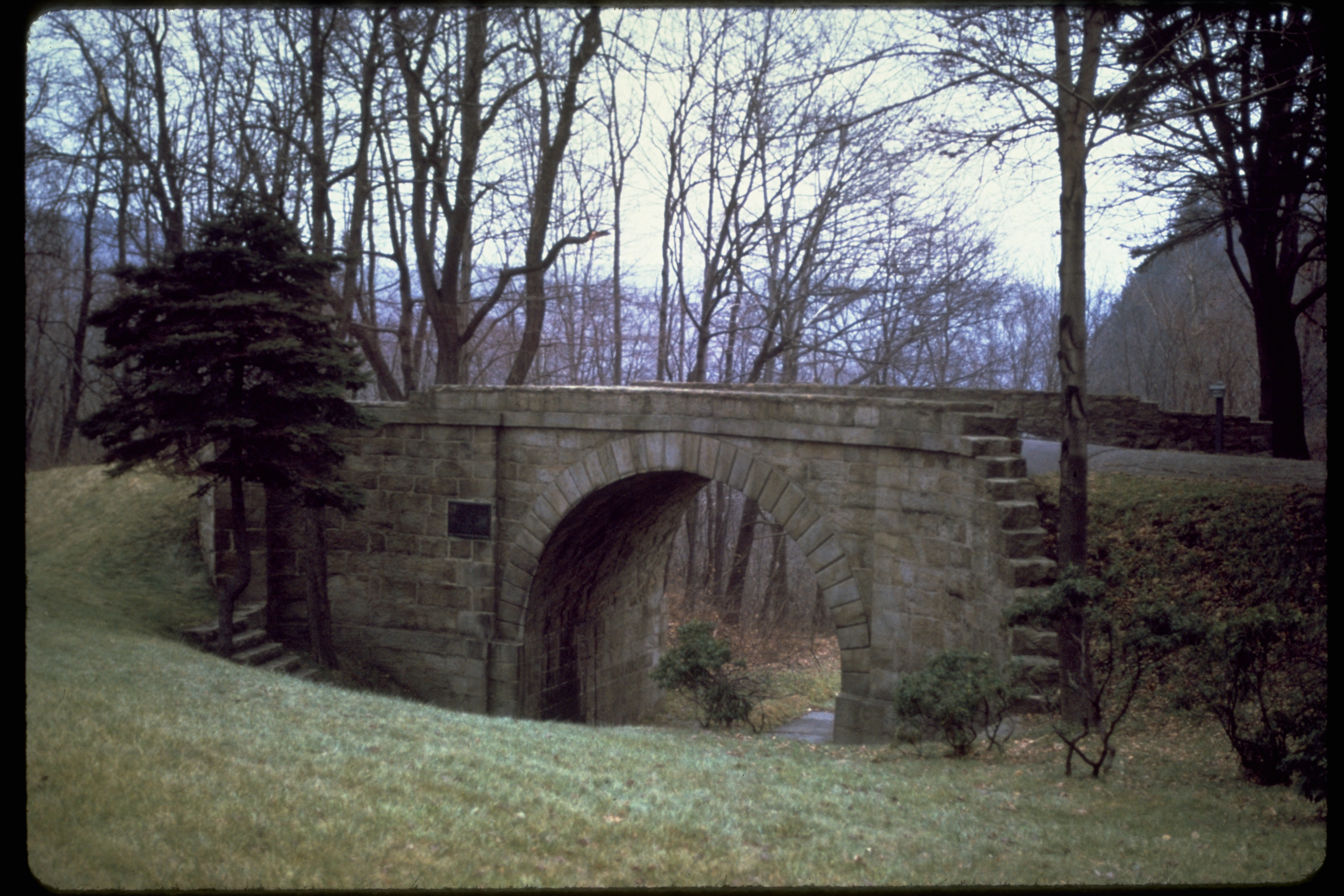
North face of the Skew Arch Bridge at the National Historic Site

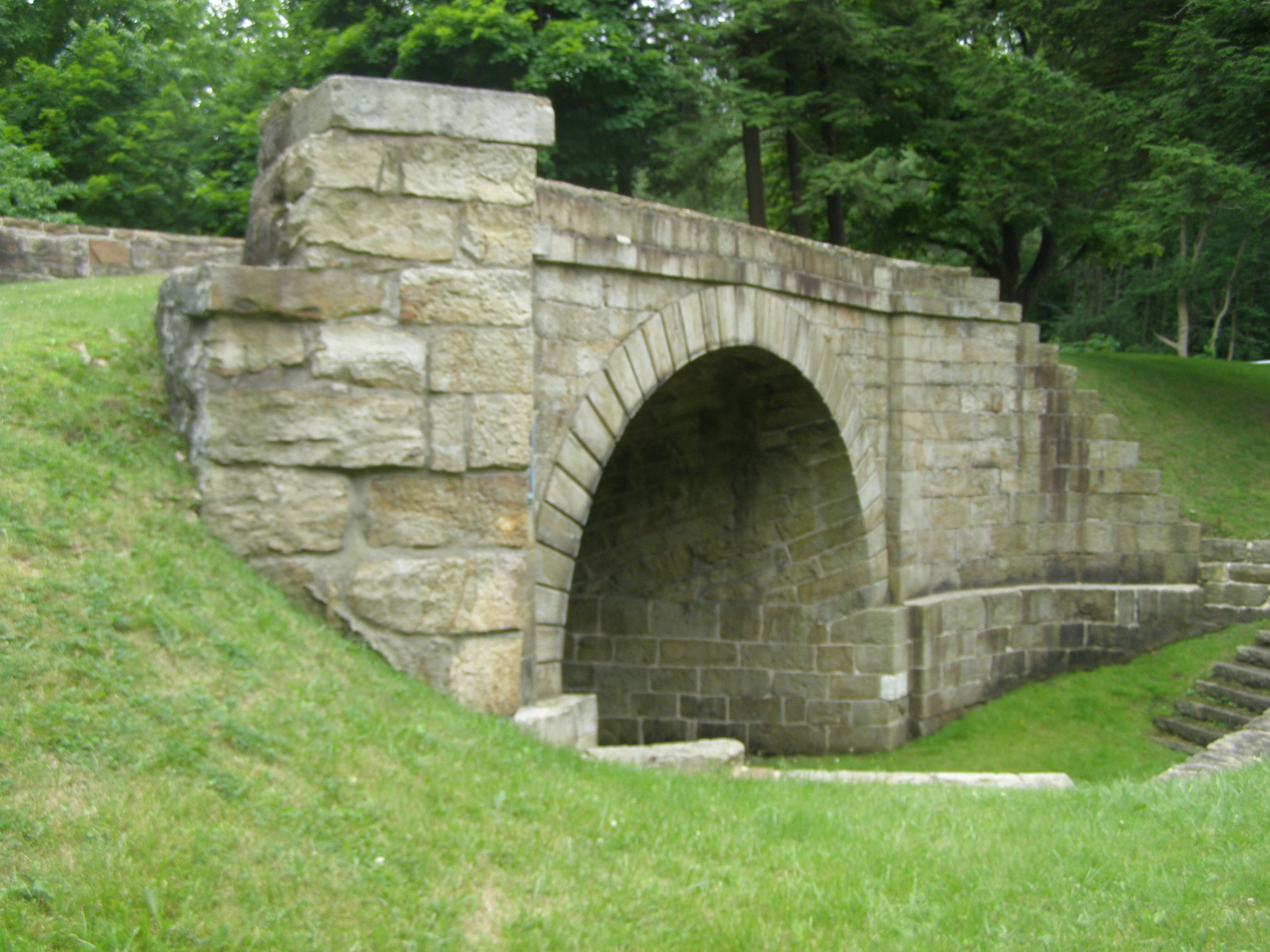
South face of the Skew Arch Bridge

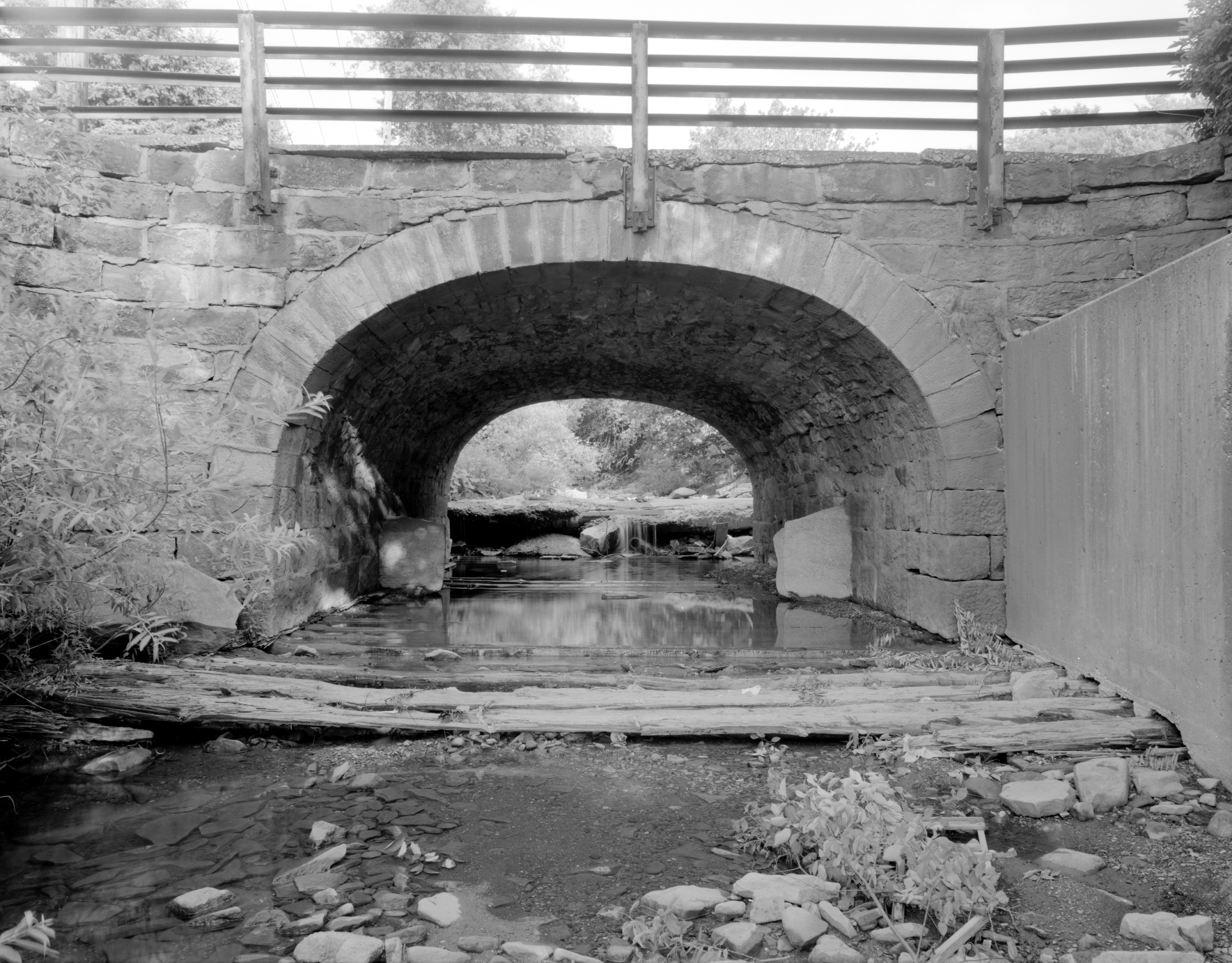
Lilly Culvert, built 1832, along the APRR

== See also ==
- National Register of Historic Places listings in Blair County, Pennsylvania
- National Register of Historic Places listings in Cambria County, Pennsylvania
- Bridge in Portage Township
- Horseshoe Curve (Pennsylvania)
- Muleshoe Curve
- Kittanning Path
- Lilly Bridge
- Morris Canal

== Bibliography ==
- Baumgardner, Mahlon J.; Hoenstine, Floyd G. (1952). The Allegheny Old Portage Railroad 1834-1854: Building Operation and travel between Hollidaysburg and Johnstown Pennsylvania. Cresson, Pennsylvania: Self Published by the Blair County Chapter and Cambria County Chapter of the Sons of the American Revolution.
- McKee, Harley J. (1980). Introduction to Early American Masonry: Stone, Brick, Mortar, and Plaster. The Preservation Press. ISBN 978-0891330066.
