= Horseshoe Curve (Pennsylvania) =

Rail curve in Altoona, Pennsylvania, US

- U.S. National Register of Historic Places
- U.S. National Historic Landmark
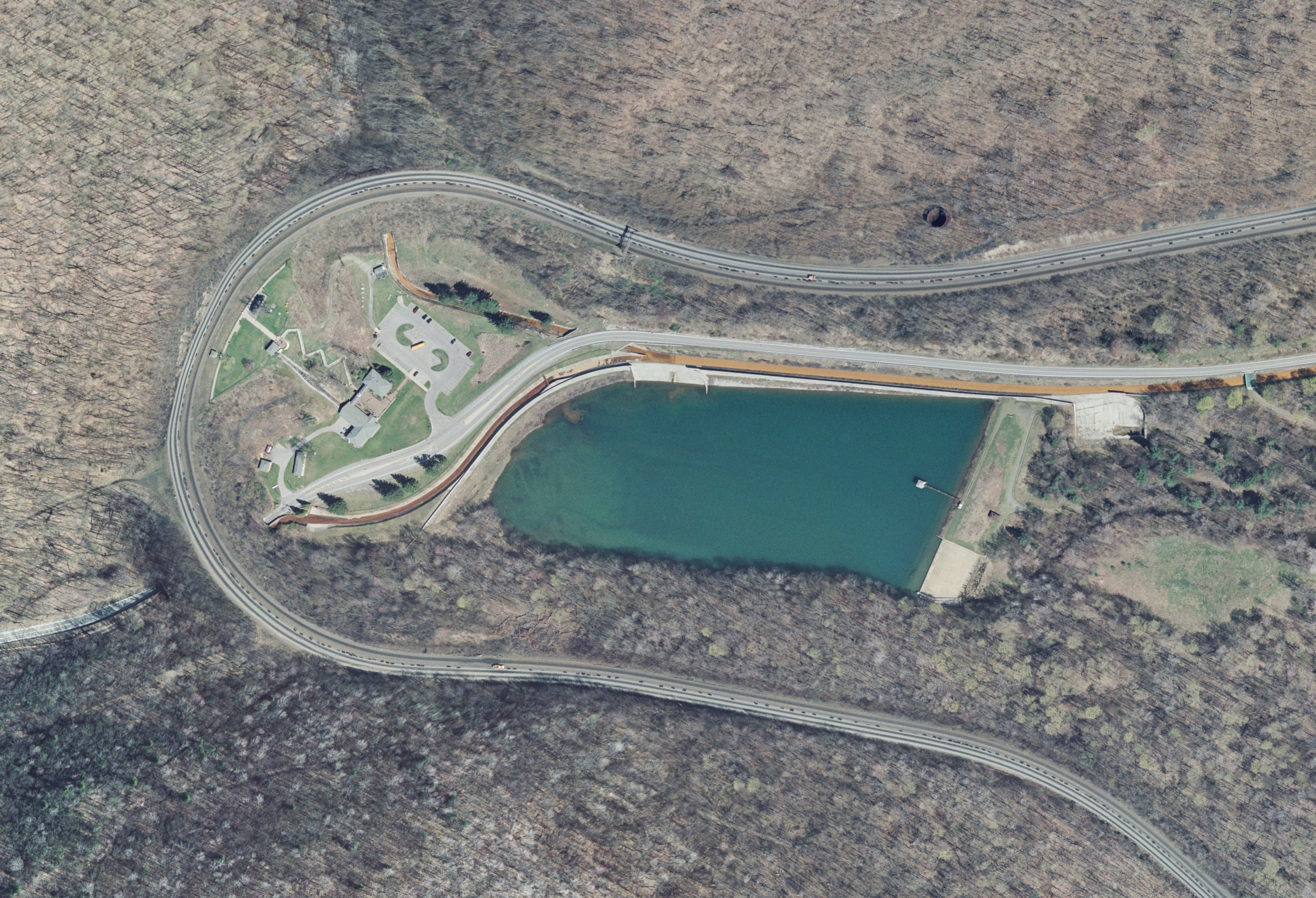
- A March 2006 aerial photo of Horseshoe Curve

- Location within Pennsylvania Location within the United States
- Location: Logan Township, Blair County, Pennsylvania, U.S.
- Nearest city: Altoona, Pennsylvania, U.S.
- Coordinates: 40°29′51.5″N 78°29′3″W
- Built: 1851–1854
- Built by: Pennsylvania Railroad
- Architect: John Edgar Thomson
- NRHP reference No.: 66000647

Significant dates
- Added to NRHP: November 13, 1966
- Designated NHL: November 13, 1966

The Horseshoe Curve is a three-track railroad curve on Norfolk Southern Railway's Pittsburgh Line in Blair County, Pennsylvania, United States. The curve is roughly 2,375 feet (700 m) long and 1,300 feet (400 m) in diameter. Completed in 1854 by the Pennsylvania Railroad as a way to reduce the westbound grade to the summit of the Allegheny Mountains, it replaced the time-consuming Allegheny Portage Railroad, which was the only other route across the mountains for large vehicles. The curve was later owned and used by three Pennsylvania Railroad successors: Penn Central, Conrail, and Norfolk Southern.

Horseshoe Curve has long been a tourist attraction. A trackside observation park was completed in 1879. The park was renovated and a visitor center built in the early 1990s. The Railroaders Memorial Museum in Altoona manages the center, which has exhibits pertaining to the curve. The Horseshoe Curve was added to the National Register of Historic Places when it was designated as a National Historic Landmark in 1966. It became a National Historic Civil Engineering Landmark in 2004.

== Location and design ==
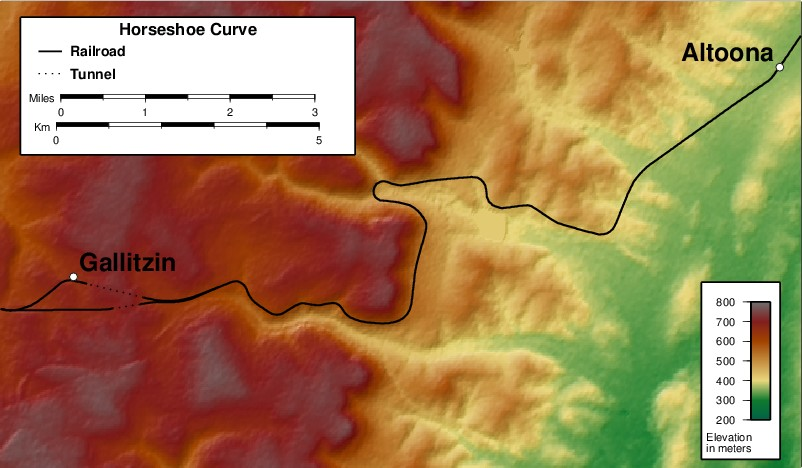
A topographic map of the area around the Horseshoe Curve

Horseshoe Curve is 5 miles (8 km) west of Altoona, Pennsylvania, in Logan Township, Blair County. It sits at railroad milepost 242 on the Pittsburgh Line, which is the Norfolk Southern Railway Pittsburgh Division main line between Pittsburgh and Harrisburg, Pennsylvania. Horseshoe Curve bends around a dam and lake, the highest of three Altoona Water Authority reservoirs that supply water from the valley to the city. It spans two ravines formed by creeks: Kittanning Run, on the north side of the valley, and Glenwhite Run, on the south. The Blair County Veterans Memorial Highway (SR 4008) follows the valley west from Altoona and tunnels under the curve.

Westbound trains climb a maximum grade of 1.85 percent for 12 miles (19 km) from Altoona to Gallitzin. Just west of the Gallitzin Tunnels, trains pass the summit of the Allegheny Mountains, then descend for 25 miles (40 km) to Johnstown on a grade of 1.1 percent or less. The overall grade of the curve was listed by the Pennsylvania Railroad as 1.45 percent; it is listed as 1.34 percent by Norfolk Southern. The curve is 2,375 feet (724 m) long and about 1,300 feet (400 m) across at its widest. For every 100 feet (30 m), the tracks at the Horseshoe Curve bend 9 degrees 15 arc minutes, with the entire curve totaling 220 degrees.

The rise of a westbound train through the curve can be described in several ways. One measurement is from the point where the rails north of the curve start to bow out to a point on the line directly south, across the original Kittanning Reservoir: across this north–south distance of 1,119 feet (340 m), a train rises from 1,601 feet (490 m) above sea level to 1,660 feet (510 m). Another measurement is from the point where the rails coming west out of Altoona make their first detour north to the curve, to a point across Lake Altoona where the rails begin their one-mile straight run south before turning west to the Gallitzin Tunnels; this measurement encompasses the entire Curve structure, including both reservoirs built in its bounds to protect the curve from flooding. Across this north-south distance of 1,006 feet (310 m), a westbound train rises from 1,473 feet (450 m) to 1,706 feet (520 m). This latter rise—133 vertical feet in 1,006 linear feet—is a 13.2% grade, completely unascendable by conventional railroads, which usually stick to grades of 2.2% or less.

Each track consists of 136 pounds per yard (67.5 kg/m), welded rail. Before dieselization and the introduction of dynamic braking and rail oilers, the rails along the curve were transposed—left to right and vice versa—to equalize the wear on each rail from the flanges of passing steam locomotives and rail cars, thereby extending their life.

== History ==
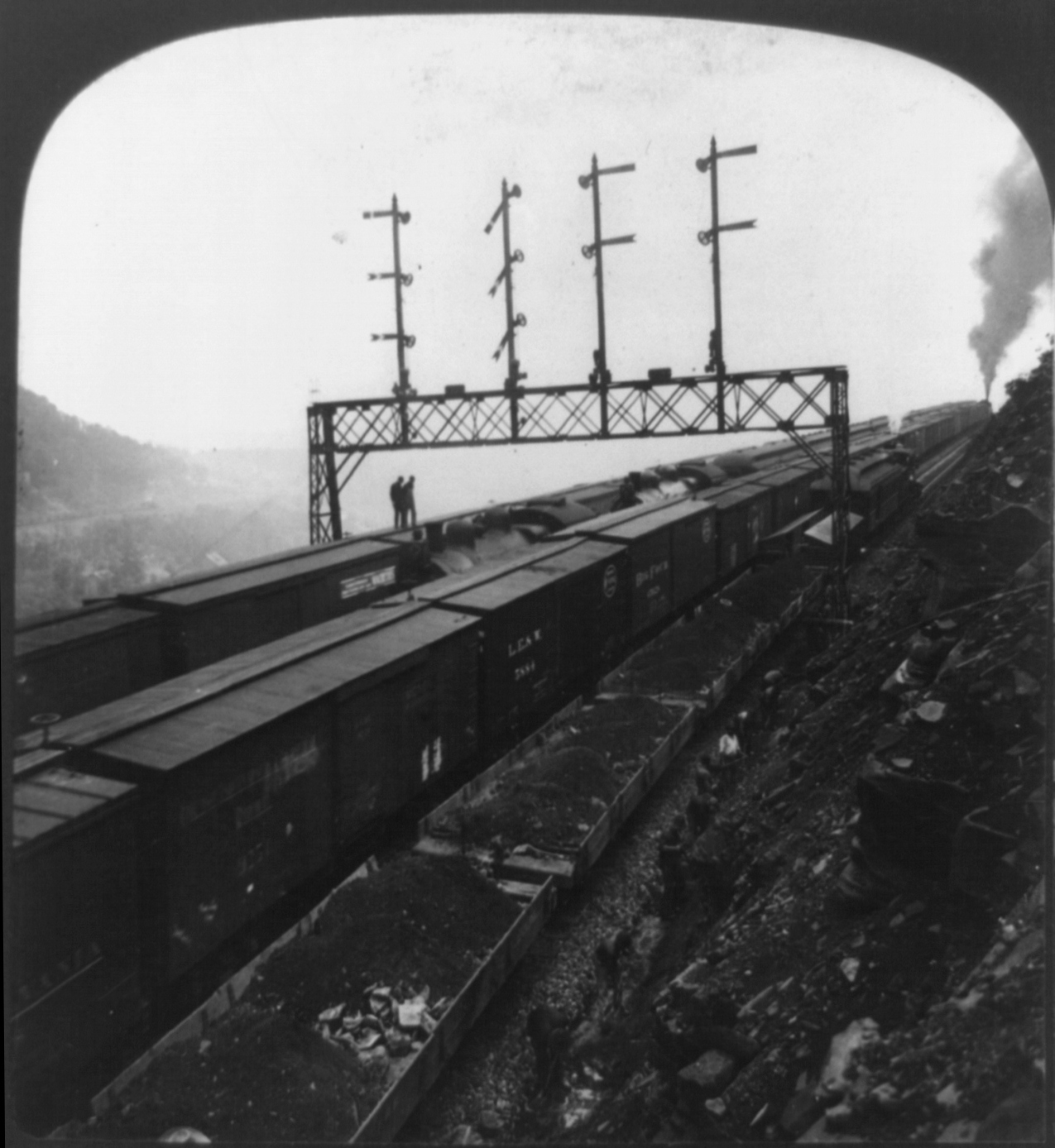
Four trains on four tracks passing each other on the Pennsylvania Railroad's mainline near Horseshoe Curve, c. 1907

=== Origin ===
In 1834, the Commonwealth of Pennsylvania built the Allegheny Portage Railroad across the Allegheny Mountains to connect Philadelphia and Pittsburgh, as part of the Main Line of Public Works. The Portage Railroad was a series of canals and inclined planes and remained in use until the mid-19th century. The Pennsylvania Railroad was incorporated in 1847 to build a railroad from Harrisburg to Pittsburgh, replacing the cumbersome Portage Railroad.

Using surveys completed in 1842, the state's engineers recommended an 84-mile (135 km) route west from Lewistown that followed the ridges with a maximum grade of 0.852 percent. But the Chief Engineer for the Pennsylvania Railroad, John Edgar Thomson, chose a route on lower, flatter terrain along the Juniata River and accepted a steeper grade west of Altoona. The valley west of Altoona was split into two ravines by a mountain; surveys had already found a route with an acceptable grade east from Gallitzin to the south side of the valley, and the proposed Horseshoe Curve would allow the same grade to continue to Altoona.

=== Construction ===
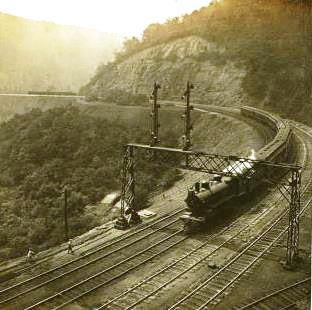
A stereo card of a passenger train on the curve, c. 1907

Work on Horseshoe Curve began in 1850. It was done without heavy equipment, only men "with picks and shovels, horses and drags". Engineers built an earth fill over the first ravine encountered while ascending, formed by Kittanning Run, cut the point of the mountain between the ravines, and filled in the second ravine, formed by Glenwhite Run. The 31.1-mile (50.1 km) line between Altoona and Johnstown, including Horseshoe Curve, opened on February 15, 1854. The total cost was $2,495,000 (equivalent to $89,404,167 in 2025) or $80,225 ($2,874,729) per mile ($49,850/$1,786,292 /km).

In 1879, the remaining part of the mountain inside the curve was leveled to allow the construction of a park and observation area—the first built for viewing trains. As demand for train travel increased, a third track was added to the curve in 1898 and a fourth was added two years later.

From around the 1860s to just before World War II, passengers could ride to the PRR's Kittanning Point station near the curve. Two branch railroads connected to the main line at Horseshoe Curve in the early 20th century; the Kittanning Run Railroad and the railroad owned by the Glen White Coal and Lumber Company followed their respective creeks to nearby coal mines. The Pennsylvania Railroad delivered empty hopper cars to the Kittanning Point station which the two railroads returned loaded with coal. In the early 1900s, locomotives could take on fuel and water at a coal trestle on a spur track across from the station.

A reservoir was built at the apex of the Horseshoe Curve in 1887 for Altoona; a second reservoir, below the first, was finished in 1896. A third reservoir, Lake Altoona, was completed by 1913. A macadam road to the curve was opened in 1932 allowing access for visitors, and a gift shop was built in 1940.

Horseshoe Curve was depicted in brochures, calendars, and other promotional material; Pennsylvania Railroad stock certificates were printed with a vignette of it. The Pennsylvania pitted the scenery of Horseshoe Curve against rival New York Central Railroad's "Water Level Route" during the 1890s. A raised-relief, scale model of the curve was included as part of the Pennsylvania Railroad's exhibit at the 1893 World's Columbian Exposition in Chicago. Pennsylvania Railroad conductors were told to announce the Horseshoe Curve to daytime passengers—a tradition that continues aboard Amtrak trains.

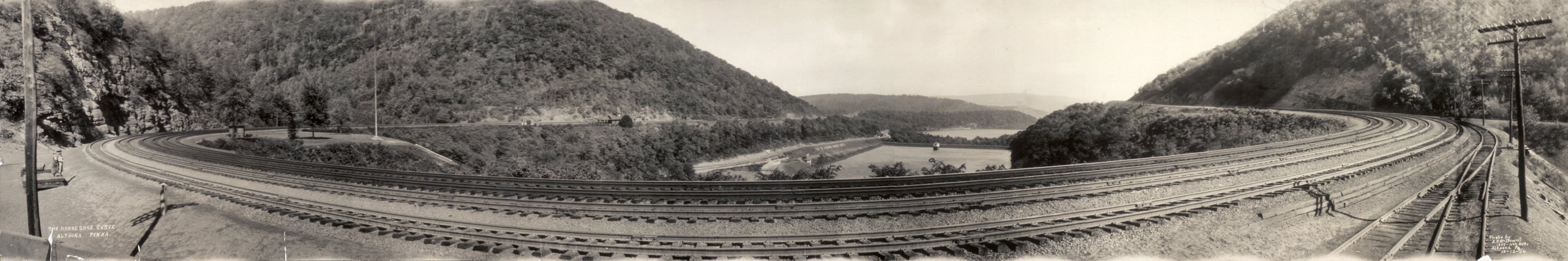
Panorama of the curve with Kittanning Point station in the distance in 1934

=== World War II and post-war ===
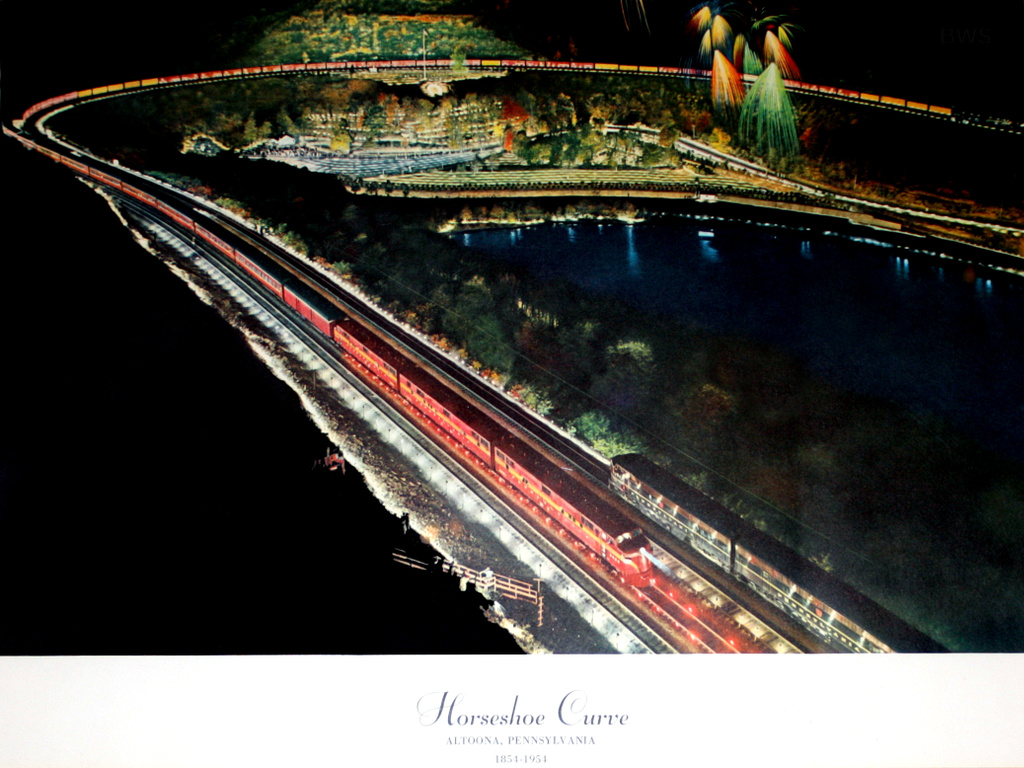
The 100th anniversary celebration of Horseshoe Curve in 1954

During World War II, the PRR carried troops and materiel for the Allied war effort, and the curve was under armed guard. The military intelligence arm of Nazi Germany, the Abwehr, plotted to sabotage important industrial assets in the United States in a project code-named Operation Pastorius. In June 1942, four men were brought by submarine and landed on Long Island, planning to destroy such sites as the curve, Hell Gate Bridge, Alcoa aluminum factories and locks on the Ohio River. The would-be saboteurs were quickly apprehended by the Federal Bureau of Investigation after one, George John Dasch, turned himself in. All but Dasch and one other would-be saboteur were executed as spies and saboteurs.

Train count peaked in the 1940s with over 50 passenger trains per day, along with many freight and military trains. Demand for train travel dropped greatly after World War II, as highway and air travel became popular.

During the 1954 celebration of the centennial of the opening of Horseshoe Curve, a night photo was arranged by Sylvania Electric Products using 6,000 flashbulbs and 31 miles (50 km) of wiring to illuminate the area. The event also commemorated the 75th anniversary of the incandescent light bulb. Steam locomotive No. 1361 was placed at the park inside the Horseshoe Curve on June 8, 1957. It is one of 425 K4-class engines: the principal passenger locomotives on the Pennsylvania Railroad that regularly plied the curve. The Horseshoe Curve was listed on the National Register of Historic Places when it was designated a National Historic Landmark on November 13, 1966. The operation of the observation park was transferred to the city of Altoona the same year. The Pennsylvania Railroad was combined with the New York Central Railroad in 1968. The merger created Penn Central, which went bankrupt in 1970 and was taken over by the federal government in 1976, as part of the merger that created Conrail. The second track from the inside at the Horseshoe Curve was removed by Conrail in 1981. No. 1361 was removed from the curve for a restoration to working order in September 1985 and was replaced with an ex-Conrail EMD GP9 No. 7048 that was repainted into its former Pennsylvania Railroad scheme.

Starting in June 1990, the park at the Horseshoe Curve underwent a $5.8 million renovation funded by the Pennsylvania Department of Transportation and by the National Park Service through its "America's Industrial Heritage Project". The renovations were completed in April 1992 with the dedication of a new visitor center. In 1999, Conrail was divided between CSX Transportation and Norfolk Southern, with the Horseshoe Curve being acquired by the latter. The Horseshoe Curve was lit up again with fireworks and rail-borne searchlights during its sesquicentennial in 2004 in homage to the 1954 celebrations. It was designated a National Historic Civil Engineering Landmark by the American Society of Civil Engineers in 2004.

== Current operations ==
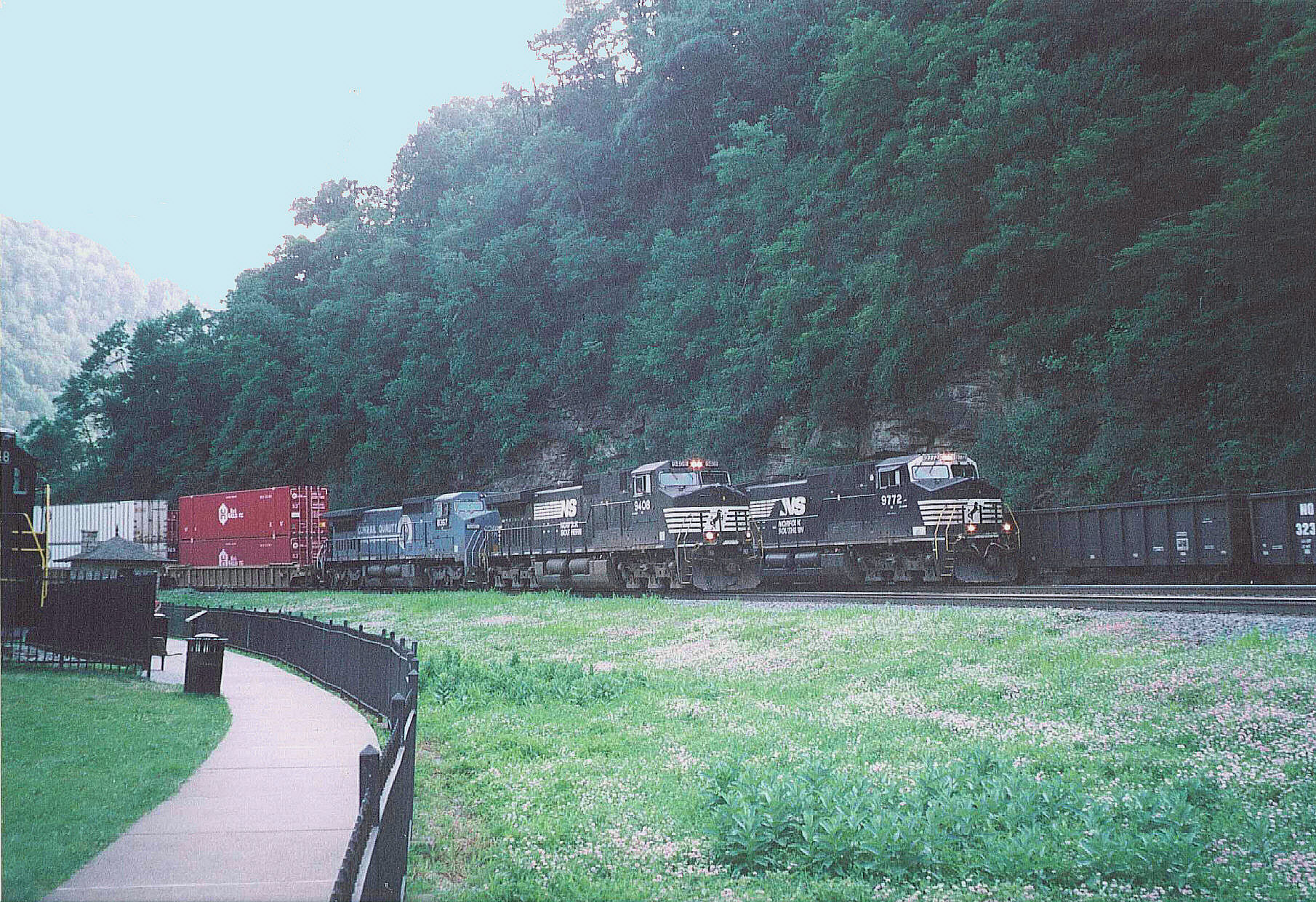
Three Norfolk Southern freight trains pass each other on the curve in 2006

The curve remains busy as part of Norfolk Southern's Pittsburgh Line: as of 2008, it was passed by 51 scheduled freight trains each day, not including locals and helper engines, which can double the number. Coupled to the rear of long trains, helper engines add power going up and help to brake coming down. For some years before 2020, Norfolk Southern used SD40Es as helpers; since then, 4,300-horsepower (3,200 kW) EMD SD70ACU locomotives are used. In 2012, Norfolk Southern said annual traffic passing Horseshoe Curve was 111.8 million short tons (101.4 Mt), including locomotives. Amtrak's Pennsylvanian between Pittsburgh and New York City rounds the curve once each way daily. Maximum speeds for trains at Horseshoe Curve are 30 miles per hour (48 km/h) for freight and about 35 miles per hour (56 km/h) for passenger trains.

== Trackside attractions ==
The Railroaders Memorial Museum in Altoona manages a visitor center next to the curve. The 6,800-square-foot (632 m^{2}) center has historical artifacts and memorabilia relating to the curve and a raised-relief map of the Altoona–Johnstown area. Access to the curve is by a 288-foot (88 m) funicular or a 194-step stairway. The funicular is single-tracked, with the cars passing each other halfway up the slope; the cars are painted to resemble Pennsylvania Railroad passenger cars. A former "watchman's shanty" is in the park.

Horseshoe Curve is popular with railfans; watchers can sometimes see three trains passing at once. In August 2012, the former Nickel Plate Road (NKP) steam locomotive No. 765 traversed Horseshoe Curve: the first steam locomotive to do so since 1977, while deadheading to and from Harrisburg as part of Norfolk Southern's 21st Century Steam program. No. 765 returned to the curve in May 2013 with public excursion trains from Lewistown to Gallitzin.

On July 11, 2026, the curve saw the passage of Union Pacific Big Boy No. 4014. The locomotive, accompanied by five specially painted Union Pacific and Norfolk Southern diesels and a consist of UP and NS passenger cars, was returning west after visiting Philadelphia for the America 250 celebrations during the July 4 weekend. Several thousand viewers were in the park in person, as well as more than 10,000 more watching live on a railfan webcam mounted at the curve.

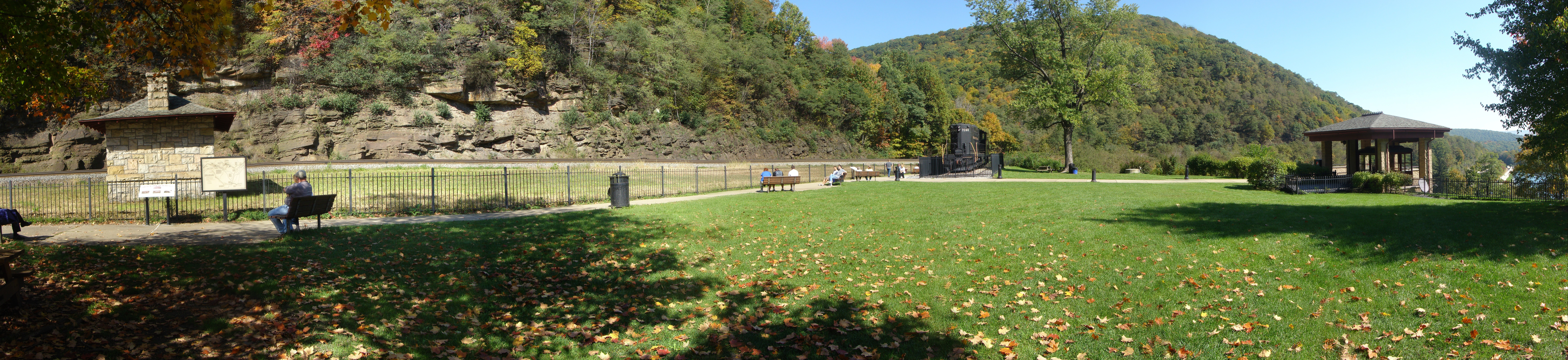
A panorama of the observation park inside Horseshoe Curve, including the watchman's shanty (left), No. 7048 (center), and the funicular (right) in October 2011

== See also ==
- Altoona Curve, a local baseball team named after the railroad curve.
- List of funicular railways
- List of Historic Civil Engineering Landmarks
- List of National Historic Landmarks in Pennsylvania
- National Register of Historic Places listings in Blair County, Pennsylvania
- Raurimu Spiral
- Tehachapi Loop
