= Barrier ridge =

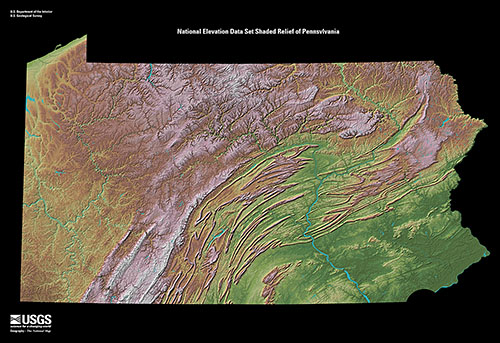
The barrier nature of the ridge and valley physiognomy gives ample hint as to how difficult passing west across the Appalachians was until railroads pierced the four water gaps to the interior west of the Hudson. Even in New England, travel through the range is dependent upon low passes and valleys through water gaps.

The terms barrier ridge, a term of art in the earth sciences, especially geology and sometimes barrier range (more common as a geography term) describing the existence of gross landforms describing long ridgelines which are particularly difficult to pass, especially in the context of being on foot or dependent upon other forms of animal powered transportation systems, in mountainous and sometimes hilly terrains.

Barrier ridges such as the steep rising slopes or escarpments of the Allegheny Front, separating the ridge-and-valley Appalachians from the drainage divides of the uplands of the Appalachian Plateau. The ridge and valley region is filled with a succession of nearly impassible ridges from Northern Georgia, along the Appalachian chain all the way to Maine.
