= Main Line (Pennsylvania Railroad) =

Former railroad line from Philadelphia to Pittsburgh, Pennsylvania

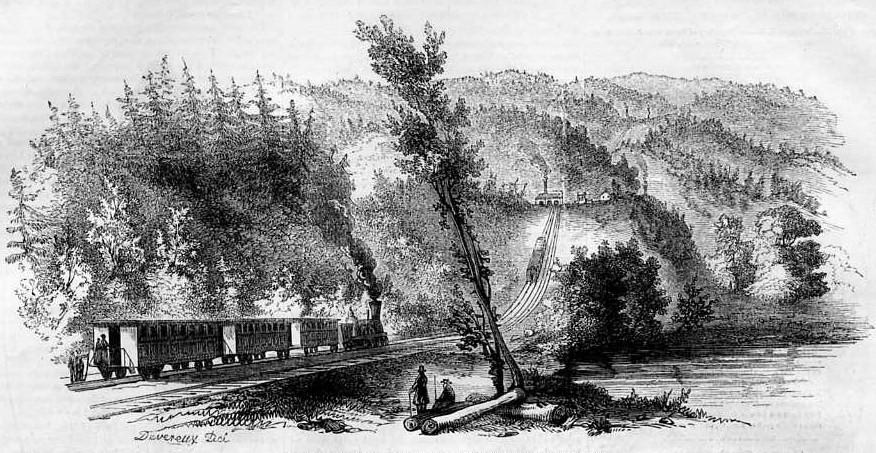
Crossing of the Alleghany, Pennsylvania Railroad, 1853 print

The Main Line of the Pennsylvania Railroad was a rail line in Pennsylvania connecting Philadelphia with Pittsburgh via Harrisburg. The rail line was divided into two. Now all of its right-of-way is a cross-state corridor, composed of Amtrak's Philadelphia to Harrisburg Main Line (including SEPTA's Paoli/Thorndale Line service) and the Norfolk Southern Railway's Pittsburgh Line.

== Early history ==
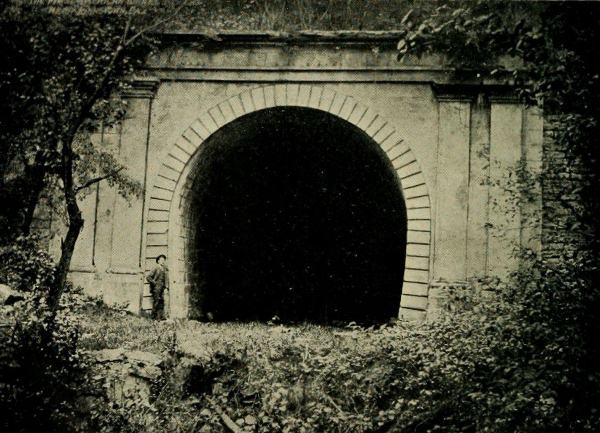
Portal of the abandoned tunnel of the Allegheny Portage Railroad near Johnstown, PA, the first railroad tunnel in the United States

The eastern part of the PRR's main line (east of Lancaster) was built by the Commonwealth of Pennsylvania as part of the Main Line of Public Works: a hybrid railroad and canal corridor across the state. The system consisted of the Philadelphia and Columbia Railroad from Philadelphia west to Columbia on the Susquehanna River, the Eastern Division Canal from Columbia to Duncan's Island, the Juniata Division Canal from Duncan's Island to Hollidaysburg, the Allegheny Portage Railroad from Hollidaysburg to Johnstown and the Western Division Canal from Johnstown to the terminus in Pittsburgh. The Philadelphia and Columbia Railroad had one inclined plane at each end; the Allegheny Portage Railroad had ten. The parts that were later included in the PRR main line opened from Philadelphia to Malvern (the end of the West Chester Railroad) in 1832 and from Malvern to Lancaster in 1834. A short piece of the Allegheny Portage Railroad in East Taylor Township and Conemaugh Township, including the Portage Viaduct over the Little Conemaugh River, later became part of the PRR main line; it was opened in 1834.

The Harrisburg, Portsmouth, Mountjoy and Lancaster Railroad opened from Harrisburg southeast to Middletown and from Lancaster northwest to Rheems in 1836. The next year, the segment from Middletown to Elizabethtown opened, and the line was completed in 1838 with the opening of the Elizabethtown Tunnel.

== Pennsylvania Railroad Company ==
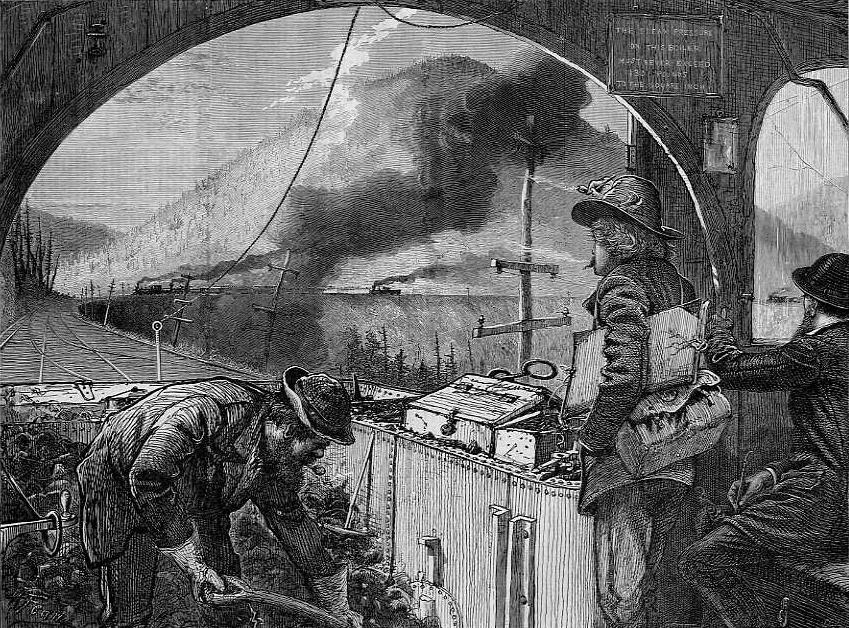
On the Way to Pittsburgh -- Great Bend on the Alleghenies, 1871

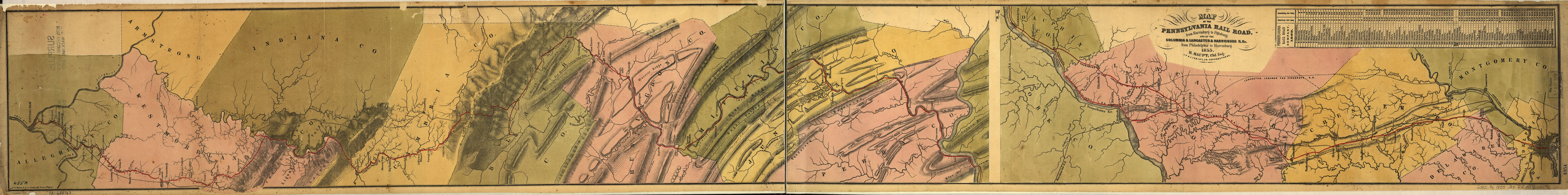
1855 map of the PRR, including the planned Lancaster, Lebanon and Pine Grove Railroad

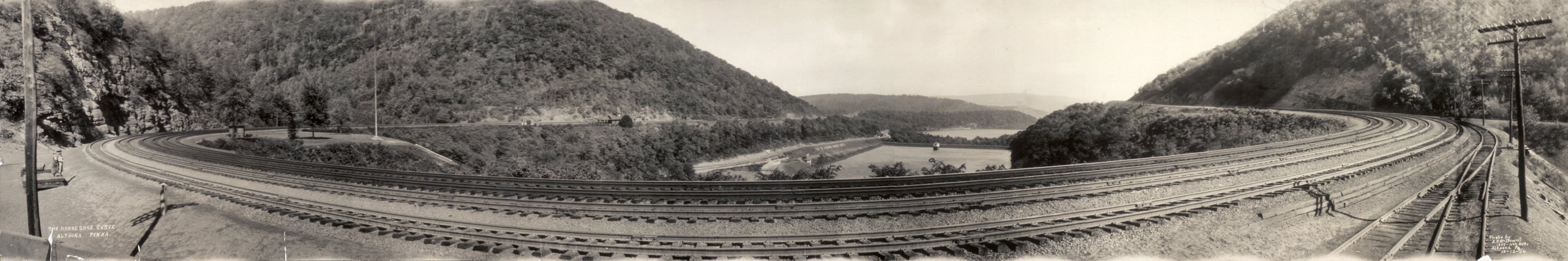
Panoramic view of Horseshoe Curve on the Pennsylvania Railroad – October 12, 1934

The Pennsylvania legislature chartered Pennsylvania Railroad Company on April 13, 1846 to build a private railroad line from Harrisburg to Pittsburgh. Construction began in 1847, and the first section opened from Harrisburg west to Lewistown on September 1, 1849 (including the original Rockville Bridge across the Susquehanna River). Further extensions opened to McVeytown on December 24, Mount Union on April 1, 1850, Huntingdon on June 10, and Duncansville (west of Hollidaysburg) on September 16, 1850, taking it to a connection with the Allegheny Portage Railroad on the east side of the Allegheny Ridge. On the other side of the ridge, the main line opened from Conemaugh (on the Portage Railroad east of Johnstown) west to Lockport on August 25, 1851. On December 10, 1851, sections opened from Lockport west to Beatty (west of Latrobe) and from Pittsburgh east to Brinton, with a temporary stagecoach transfer between them via the Southern Turnpike and a short turnpike branch built to Beatty. Part of that gap was filled on July 15, 1852, from Brinton east to Radebaugh, and on November 29 the full line was completed, forming the first all-rail route between Philadelphia and Pittsburgh, though still using seven of the original ten planes of the Allegheny Portage Railroad.

The PRR bypassed Plane Number 1 of the Portage Railroad on April 1, 1852. Other planes began to be bypassed by the New Portage Railroad, completed in 1856, but on February 15, 1854 the PRR's new line opened, leaving the old one on the east side of the ridge in Altoona and running west via the Horseshoe Curve and Gallitzin Tunnel, only using a short portion of the old Portage Railroad near South Fork and a longer adjacent section of the New Portage Railroad. A reciprocal trackage rights agreement, made on March 18, 1854, allowed the PRR to use that section free of charge.

On March 21, 1849, the PRR contracted with Eagle Line, primarily a steamboat company, for through service over the Philadelphia and Columbia Railroad. The PRR obtained trackage rights over the Harrisburg, Portsmouth, Mountjoy and Lancaster Railroad, opened in 1838, on April 21, providing a route from Harrisburg to the Philadelphia and Columbia at Dillerville, just west of Lancaster. On September 1, the first section of the PRR opened, with all arrangements in place for service from Philadelphia to Lewistown.

In 1853, the PRR surveyed the Lancaster, Lebanon, and Pine Grove Railroad from Philadelphia west via Phoenixville to Salunga on the Portsmouth, Mount Joy, and Lancaster Railroad. This was done to show the state that the PRR was willing to build its own alignment around the Philadelphia and Columbia. On August 1, 1857, the PRR bought the whole Main Line of Public Works. The Philadelphia and Columbia Railroad was integrated into its system. Most of the New Portage Railroad, just completed the previous year for $2.14 million, was abandoned, while short sections became local branches. The canals were abandoned, and short sections were filled and covered by rails. On January 1, 1861, the PRR leased the HPMJ&L, giving it full control of its main line.

In 1904, the New Portage Railroad east of the Gallitzin Tunnels (through the "Muleshoe Curve") was reopened as the New Portage Branch, a freight bypass line. Conrail closed this line in 1981.

== See also ==
- Philadelphia to Harrisburg Main Line
- SEPTA Paoli/Thorndale Line
- Norfolk Southern Pittsburgh Line
- Keystone Corridor
- Philadelphia Main Line
