= New Portage Branch =

Map

The New Portage Branch was a rail line which ran between the New Portage Tunnel and Duncansville, Pennsylvania.

== History ==
The line was opened between 1852 and 1856 by the Commonwealth of Pennsylvania as a bypass of a portion of their Allegheny Portage Railroad, itself a portion of the Main Line of Public Works. In 1857, the line was purchased by the Pennsylvania Railroad and was abandoned.

In 1904, due to increasing traffic on Pennsylvania Railroad's main line in the area, the line was reopened. Together with the railroad's Petersburg Branch, it was used as a bypass, providing a second route around the railyards at Altoona and the Horseshoe Curve on the mainline.

In 1981, the line was abandoned from the east portal of the New Portage Tunnel to Hollidaysburg.

== Current status ==
As of 2019, the New Portage Tunnel is still in use as part of Norfolk Southern's Pittsburgh Line. The section from US 22 south to the Muleshoe Curve bridge over Old US 22 is a Pennsylvania State Game Lands road; the section from the Muleshoe Curve bridge to Foot of Ten, Pennsylvania is part of the 6 to 10 Trail.

== See also ==
- Allegheny Portage Railroad
- Muleshoe Curve
- New Portage Tunnel
