= Mildred Weston =

American author and composer

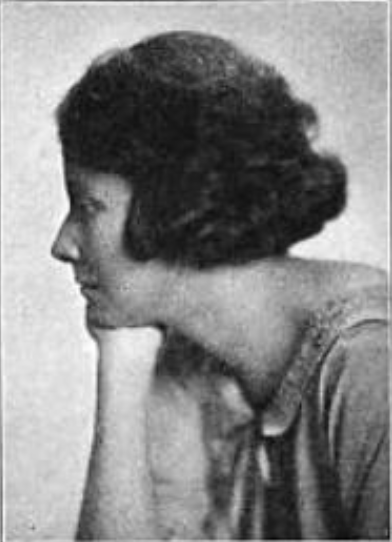
Mildred Weston

Mildred Weston Rogers (May 1892 - February 6, 1975) was an American composer and writer best known for a number of children's pedagogical piano suites and her music criticism for New Yorker magazine.

Not to be confused with American poet Mildred Weston (1905-1998)

== Biography ==
Weston was born in Gallitzin, Pennsylvania, to William and Anna Weston. She graduated from the Pennsylvania College for Women (now Chatham University) in Pittsburgh in 1913, studying under T. Carl Whitmer. She pursued further studies at the New England Conservatory of Music.

After college, Weston taught music to kindergarteners at Miss Simonson's School in Pittsburgh. This experience informed the composition of a number of programmatic and pedagogical suites for piano, many of which were published by the Arthur P. Schmidt company (now Summy Birchard).

Weston married William G. Rogers, an author and newspaper editor, on Oct 5, 1934 in Springfield.

== Selected works ==
Her works include:

=== Piano ===
- Ten Fingers At the Zoo (1919)
- Under the Christmas Tree (1920, Theodore Presser Co)
- About Fairies (1922, Arthur P. Schmidt)
- In an Apple Orchard (seven piece suite)
- Slumber Song: Pyrenees Folk Tune (1923, published by Carl Fischer)
- Sandman (1925)
- Toys: A Suite for the Piano (1923, published by John Church) This suite was in the first grade of the New England Conservatory's piano teaching curriculum in 1929.
- Red Riding Hood (published by John Church)
- Under an April Sky (seven piece suite)
- Under the Christmas Tree (1922) The eleven pieces are: Hobby Horse, A Doll That Goes to Sleep, The Tinkle-Tinkle Box, In a Little White Cradle, The Big Red Drum, Wooden Soldiers, Taps, The Little Pop-Gun, Jumping Jack, Candle Lighting Time, and Twinkle, Twinkle, Christmas Tree.
- Goldilocks (1927, published by Arthur P. Schmidt)
- The Village Green (1930, Arthur P. Schmidt)
- Cinderella: A Fairy Tale (1931, Carl Fischer)
- Swaying Willows: Novelty Dance on Black Keys (1934, Carl Fischer)

=== Prose ===
- Carnival Crossroads: The Story of Times Square (with her husband William G. Rogers)
- music criticism for New Yorker magazine (1945)

=== Vocal ===
- Carol to the Child (1971)
- Holy Family Carol (SATB; 1941)
