= Muleshoe Curve =

Coordinates: 40.4350°N 78.5200°W

Muleshoe Curve is a curve of track used by the former Pennsylvania Railroad (PRR) near Duncansville, Pennsylvania. Part of a secondary and frequently disused route, the curve is less well known than Horseshoe Curve, located 4.34 mi (7 km) north.

The curve was built in 1850s by the state of Pennsylvania as part of the New Portage Railroad. In 1857, the PRR purchased the line and promptly closed it, as the railroad already had its own line in the region. The PRR brought the line back into service in the 1890s to serve increasing rail traffic, but soon closed it and sent its rails for use on a subsidiary, the Pittsburgh, Fort Wayne & Chicago Railroad. In 1904, the PRR reopened the line and double-tracked it for use as a bypass. One track was removed in 1955. After the PRR was merged into Penn Central and later taken over by Conrail, Muleshoe Curve was permanently abandoned in 1981.

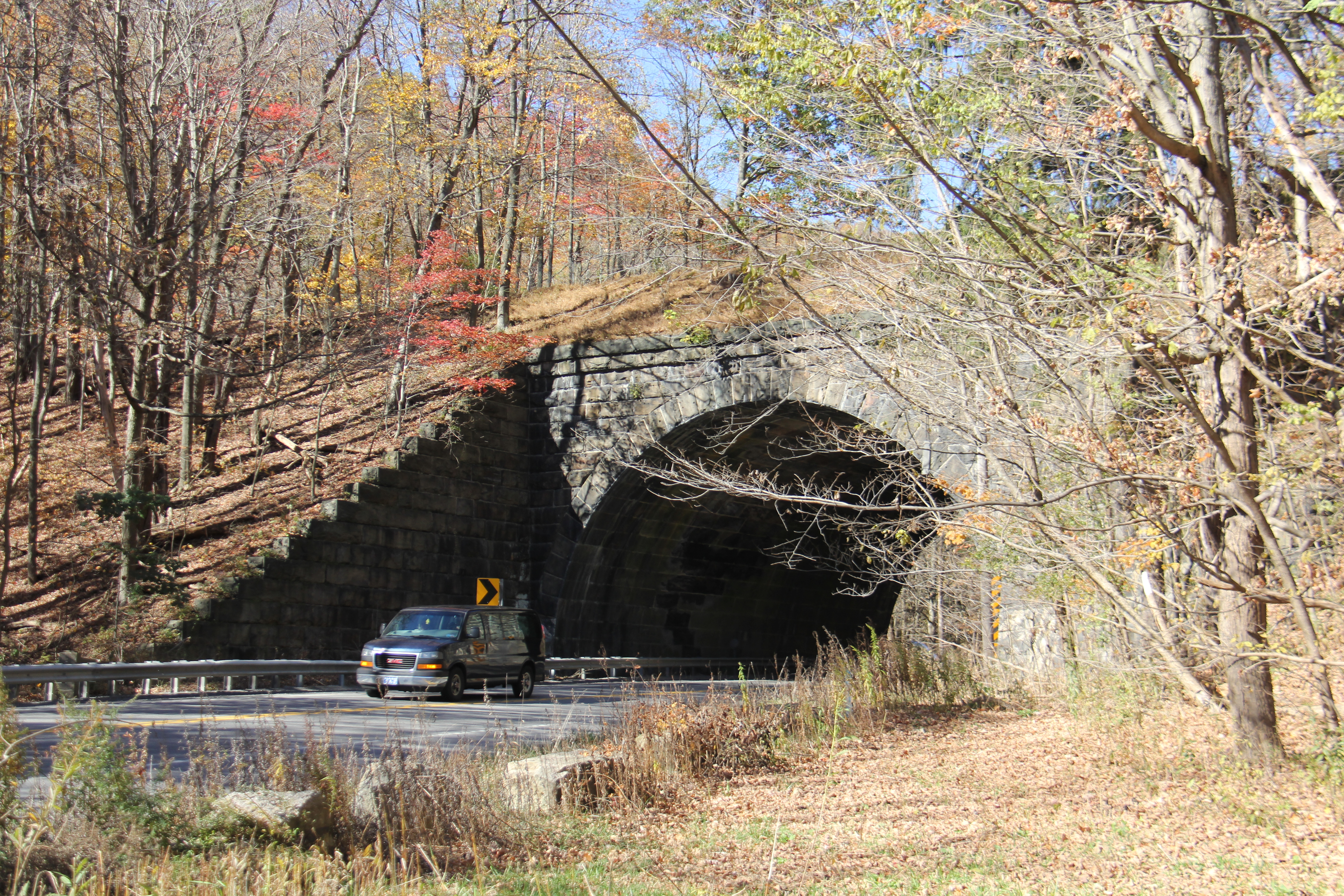
Bridge carrying Muleshoe Curve over Old US Route 22.
