= Gallitzin, Pennsylvania =

Borough in Pennsylvania, US

- Borough
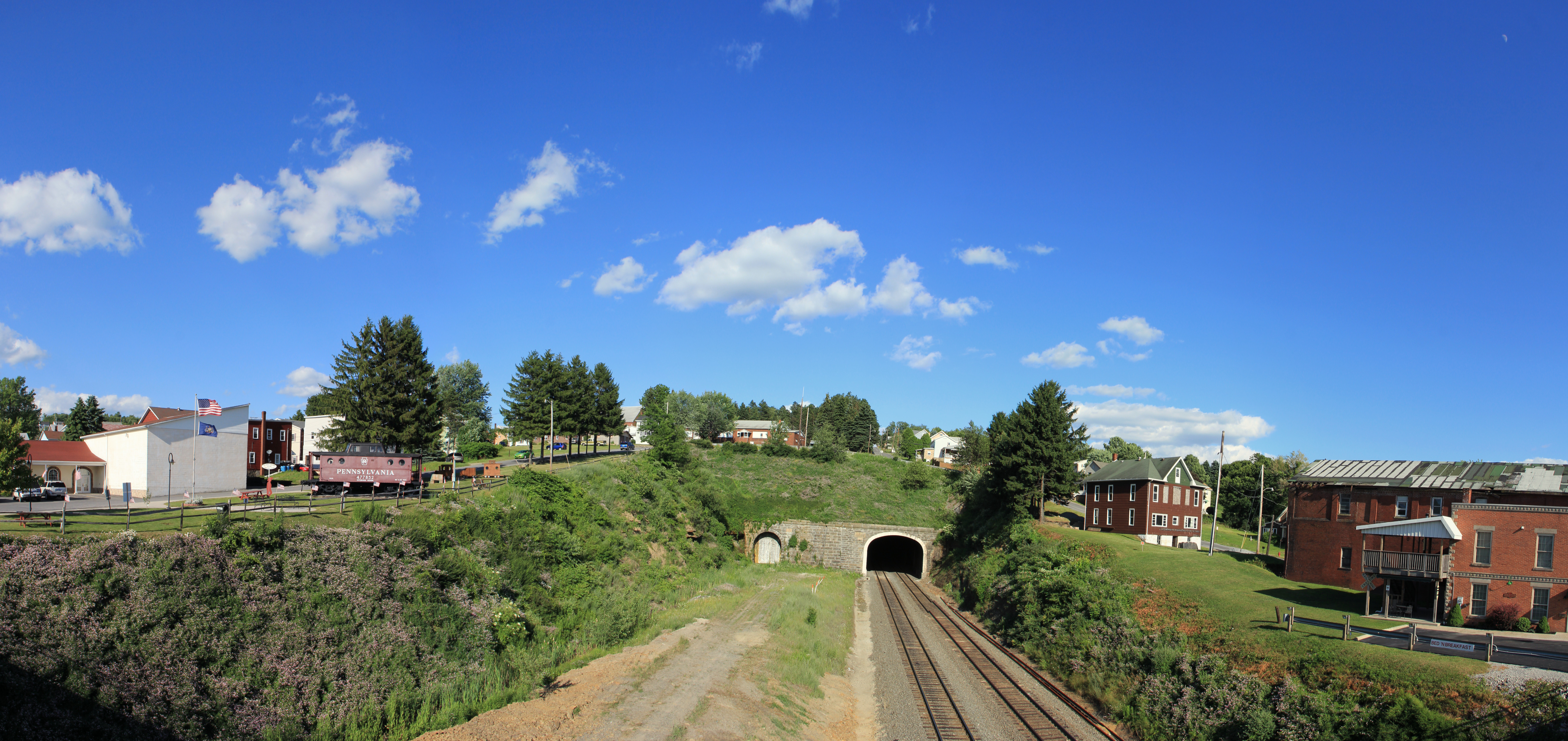
- Western portal of the Gallitzin Tunnel

- Location of Gallitzin in Cambria County, Pennsylvania.

- Location within Pennsylvania
- Coordinates: 40°28′55″N 78°33′08″W
- Country: United States
- State: Pennsylvania
- County: Cambria
- Settled: 1849
- Incorporated: 1873

Government
  - Type: Borough council
  - Mayor: Raymond Osmolinski Sr.

Area
  - Total: 0.74 sq mi (1.91 km^{2})
  - Land: 0.74 sq mi (1.91 km^{2})
  - Water: 0 sq mi (0.00 km^{2})
- Elevation: 2,225 ft (678 m)

Population (2020)
  - Total: 1,536
  - Density: 2,079.4/sq mi (802.86/km^{2})
- Time zone: UTC-5 (Eastern (EST))
  - Summer (DST): UTC-4 (EDT)
- ZIP code: 16641
- Area code: 814
- FIPS code: 42-28328
- GNIS feature ID: 1215022
- Website: https://gallitzinpa.com/

Gallitzin is a borough in Cambria County, Pennsylvania, United States. As of the 2020 census, Gallitzin had a population of 1,536. It is bordered by Gallitzin Township and Tunnelhill, all of which sit astride the Eastern continental divide. Tunnel Hill and Gallitzin both are pierced by railroad tunnels shortening the necessary ascent for rails crossing the Allegheny Front onto the Allegheny Plateau which encompasses the towns' terrains. Topping the gaps of the Allegheny, the area is one of only five major breaks in the Appalachians allowing east–west transportation corridors before the advent of 20th century technologies. (Note: Five ways through the Appalachians east to west: Around the bottom (plains or Piedmont area) in Georgia, the Cumberland Gap, the Cumberland Narrows, the gaps of the Allegheny Front, and up the Hudson River then around the north end of the Catskills and across upstate New York, the so called level water route to the Great Lakes. All other transits involve difficult climbs a man on foot can only make with great difficulty, and which animal drawn transport could not.)

== History ==
Dutch traders and trappers friendly to the Susquehannock may have visited the region about 1620, as the town sits atop a mountain pass through which the ancient Amerindian trails (later renamed the Kittanning Path) transited. The plateau atop the escarpment was the domain of the Iroquoian confederations of the Erie people and the Susquehannock peoples, both sharing the byways and hunting lands of the Allegheny Mountains until about the mid-1650s. The Susquehannock and Erie people are known to have traded through the area, one of the few avenues the Erie, who dominated the hunting lands west of the Alleghenies, had to obtain by firearms; though, by all accounts, all the tribes in contact with the numerous Erie were reluctant to trade them firearms. Further, Susquehannocks are quoted to have expected 800 Erie warriors in 1662 to join in their war with the Iroquois. By 1675, both the Susquehannocks and Erie tribes would both fall to rampant multiple-years of epidemic diseases, in combination with the vicious multi-decade internecine territorial bloodletting known as the Beaver Wars, which left the Alleghenies a remote hunting ground of the Five Nations of the Iroquois Confederation.

By the early 1700s, the Delaware people still living along the eastern seaboard were increasingly treated as bad or worse than slaves, and displaced clear across the breadth of Pennsylvania to beyond the Allegheny Front, where they settled along the rivers of Western Pennsylvania. One of their larger settlements, and closest to the gaps of the Allegheny, was the Amerindian town of Kittanning along the middle reaches of the Allegheny River. These towns would generally ally themselves with the French during the French and Indian War, causing settlers in central Pennsylvania to mount a guard and patrol on the gaps. By the late 1700s, the remnant Seneca and Cayuga that became known as the Ohio Iroquois or Mingo would have ranged the area, especially because they were known to make their towns along defensible hill tops and kept to the uplands. With iron and coal discovered west of the gaps, white settlers began traveling west through the area around the time the American Revolution came to a close. By 1824, the visionary Main Line of Public Works legislation had been debated and signed and the construction of the Allegheny Portage Railroad soon began aiming to connect Pittsburgh and the Ohio Country to Philadelphia by canals. In 1838, this plan was altered to incorporate the rapidly-developing and ever more capable railroad technology. In 1845, the Pennsylvania legislature required the new Pennsylvania Railroad to cross the mountains, and the surveyed route would create Gallitzin, which began life as 'Summit Tunnel'.

A Railroad town standing 12 miles (19 km) west of Altoona, it was first incorporated in 1872, and named for Prince Gallitzin, who founded the Catholic town of Loretto in Cambria County. Coal mining, the Pennsylvania Railroad yard in the town center and the production of coke were important industries. The town still sports an important rail yard with a turning wye for helper engine turnaround and holds two rail tunnels leading east and downward from the yard trackage to the famous PRR Horseshoe Curve, whose upper approaches are within the town.

Gallitzin is listed by the US Census Bureau as part of the Johnstown Metropolitan Statistical Area, although local sources consider it part of the Altoona area, due to being located closer to Altoona than to Johnstown. In 1900, 2,759 people lived in Gallitzin, and by 1910, that number had risen to 3,504 people. As of the 2010 United States census, the borough population was 1,668.

Gallitzin is known for its historic railroad tunnels (Gallitzin Tunnels), which are a minor tourist draw. The scenic Horseshoe Curve and the Allegheny Portage Railroad historic site are also nearby situated in different gaps of the Allegheny.

== Geography ==
Gallitzin is located in eastern Cambria County at 40°28′55″N 78°33′8″W (40.481816, -78.552336), along the eastern edge of the Allegheny Plateau, a highland area of hills and small streams formed differently from the Ridge-and-valley Appalachians to the east and south of the plateau's edge, the Allegheny Ridge in Pennsylvania. Sitting astride the eastern Continental divide along the edge of the Allegheny Front escarpment, the immediate area is lower than other portions of the Appalachian Plateau, so contains several small streams and freshets forming the gaps of the Allegheny Escarpment to the east, where the ground falls away rapidly, forming steep terrain landforms. According to the U.S. Census Bureau, the borough has a total area of 0.73 square miles (1.9 km^{2}), all land.

Gallitzin has the tenth-highest elevation of towns in Pennsylvania, at 2,167 feet (661 m).

== Demographics ==
Historical population
Census	Pop.	Note	%±
1880	799		—
1890	2,392		199.4%
1900	2,759		15.3%
1910	3,504		27.0%
1920	3,580		2.2%
1930	3,458		−3.4%
1940	3,618		4.6%
1950	3,102		−14.3%
1960	2,783		−10.3%
1970	2,496		−10.3%
1980	2,315		−7.3%
1990	2,003		−13.5%
2000	1,756		−12.3%
2010	1,668		−5.0%
2020	1,536		−7.9%

As of the census of 2000, there were 1,756 people, 700 households, and 476 families residing in the borough. The population density was 2,396.0 inhabitants per square mile (925.1/km^{2}). There were 763 housing units at an average density of 1,041.1 per square mile (402.0/km^{2}). The racial makeup of the borough was 98.86% White, 0.11% African American, 0.23% Native American, 0.06% Asian, and 0.74% from two or more races. Hispanic or Latino of any race were 0.85% of the population.

There were 700 households, out of which 30.1% had children under the age of 18 living with them, 50.7% were married couples living together, 12.3% had a female householder with no husband present, and 31.9% were non-families. 29.0% of all households were made up of individuals, and 15.7% had someone living alone who was 65 years of age or older. The average household size was 2.51 and the average family size was 3.10.

In the borough the population was spread out, with 23.1% under the age of 18, 9.9% from 18 to 24, 28.6% from 25 to 44, 21.9% from 45 to 64, and 16.6% who were 65 years of age or older. The median age was 37 years. For every 100 females there were 88.6 males. For every 100 females age 18 and over, there were 87.4 males.

The median income for a household in the borough was $32,386, and the median income for a family was $38,438. Males had a median income of $29,022 versus $19,550 for females. The per capita income for the borough was $14,216. About 7.2% of families and 10.2% of the population were below the poverty line, including 13.1% of those under age 18 and 10.3% of those age 65 or over.

== Notable people ==
- Robert E. Casey, Pennsylvania State Treasurer
- Pauline Frederick, journalism pioneer
- Gertrude McDermott, Catholic Benedictine nun
- Don Rittner, author, filmmaker and historian
- Robert Peary, explorer and naval officer
- Mildred Weston, composer
