= Harrisburg, Portsmouth, Mountjoy and Lancaster Railroad =

Early American railroad

Harrisburg, Portsmouth, Mountjoy & Lancaster Rail-Road
- Route map, circa 1850

Overview
- Locale: Harrisburg, Pennsylvania
- Dates of operation: 1835–1917
- Predecessor: Portsmouth and Lancaster Rail-Road
- Successor: The Pennsylvania Railroad

Technical
- Length: 52.57 miles (84.60 km) in 1917

The Harrisburg, Portsmouth, Mountjoy & Lancaster Rail-Road (HPMtJ&L) was an early American railroad built to connect three main population centers in east-central Pennsylvania.

== History ==
In 1834, the Commonwealth of Pennsylvania chartered the Portsmouth and Lancaster Rail-Road, one of the earliest in the United States being organized only six years after the first, the Baltimore and Ohio Railroad. The following year, the company changed its name to the Harrisburg, Portsmouth, Mountjoy and Lancaster Rail-Road Company. Simon Cameron of Middletown (who later became Secretary of War under President Abraham Lincoln) and James Buchanan of Lancaster (who later became President of the United States) were among the founders.

The HPMtJ&L followed the east side of the Susquehanna River, surveyed and located in 1834 to connect the Susquehanna River valley communities of Harris Ferry (now Harrisburg), Portsmouth (now a part of Middletown), Mount Joy, and Lancaster, Pennsylvania. The HPMtJ&L also connected with the Cumberland Valley Railroad at Harrisburg, the Philadelphia and Columbia Railroad at Lancaster, and to the Portsmouth Canal Basin in Middletown. Construction work began in 1835 and the main line completed in 1838, concluding with a tunnel built just outside of Elizabethtown. The first track laid of the new railroad ran from Harrisburg to the Portsmouth section of Middletown, becoming one of the first sections of the Pennsylvania Railroad (PRR) built. The line opened with horse-drawn cars.

A branch line was completed in 1850, built from Middletown (Royalton) to Columbia, connecting with the terminus of the Philadelphia & Columbia Railroad. This branch included a very short tunnel outside of Columbia, named Point Rock Tunnel.

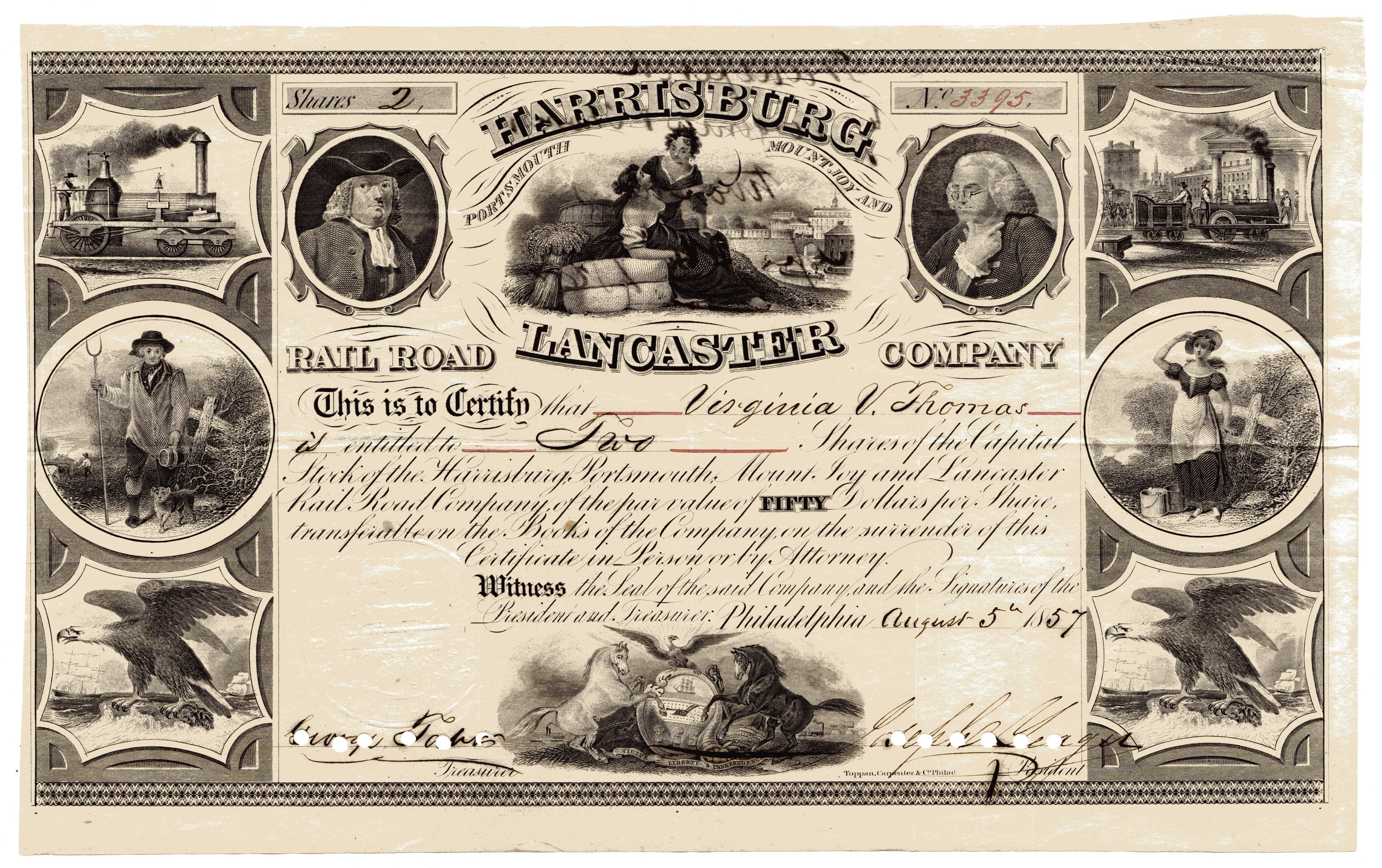
Share of the Harrisburg, Portsmouth, Mountjoy and Lancaster RR Company, issued 5. August 1857

Several improvements to the entire line were made. Beginning in 1886, the tunnel outside Elizabethtown was eliminated with an open cut. Between 1892 and 1903, 23 curves were eliminated and easement of several others. By 1917, all wooden bridges were replaced with permanent structures.

== Pennsylvania Railroad operation and control ==
The PRR first operated the HPMtJ&L under contract for 20 years starting September 1, 1849, whereby the PRR was to purchase all the equipment of the HPMtJ&L for use on both lines. The PRR next arranged a more-favorable lease of the HPMtJ&L for 999 years from January 1, 1861. This lease brought the last piece of railroad between Pittsburgh and Philadelphia under the control of the PRR. The HPMtJ&L was finally merged into the PRR on April 25, 1917.

== See also ==
- List of Pennsylvania railroads
- Pennsylvania Railroad
