= Pennsylvania Railroad =

American Class I railroad (1846–1968)

- Map of the Pennsylvania Railroad up to 1945

Overview
- Headquarters: Philadelphia, Pennsylvania, U.S.
- Key people: John Edgar Thomson Chief Engineer (1847–1852) & President (1852–1874); George Brooke Roberts President (1880–1896); Martin W. Clement President (1935–1948)
- Founder: Samuel Vaughan Merrick
- Reporting mark: PRR
- Locale: Delaware; Illinois; Indiana; Kentucky; Maryland; Michigan; Missouri; New Jersey; New York; Ohio; Pennsylvania; Virginia; Washington D.C.; West Virginia
- Dates of operation: 1846–1968
- Successor: Penn Central Transportation Company

Technical
- Track gauge: 4 ft 8 1/2 in (1,435 mm) standard gauge
- Previous gauge: At one time 4 ft 9 in (1,448 mm)
- Electrification: 12.5 kV 25 Hz AC New York City – Washington, D.C. / South Amboy Philadelphia–Harrisburg North Jersey Coast Line
- Length: 11,640.66 miles (18,733.83 kilometers) (1926)

The Pennsylvania Railroad (reporting mark PRR), officially the Pennsylvania Railroad Company, also known as the "Pennsy," was an American Class I railroad established in 1846 and headquartered in Philadelphia. In 1882, it was the largest railroad (by traffic and revenue), transportation enterprise, and corporation in the world.

Over its existence, the Pennsylvania Railroad acquired, merged with, or owned part of at least 800 other rail lines and companies. In the 1920s, the company carried several times more traffic than other Class I railroads of comparable length, such as the Union Pacific and Atchison, Topeka & Santa Fe railroads, and by the end of 1926, it operated 11,640.66 miles (18,733.83 kilometers) of rail line. (Note: This mileage includes companies independently operated. PRR miles of all tracks, which includes first (or main), second, third, fourth, and sidings, totalled 28,040.49 at the end of 1926.) The Pennsylvania Railroad's only close competitor was the New York Central Railroad (NYC), which carried around three-quarters of the PRR's ton-miles.

In 1968 the Pennsylvania Railroad merged with New York Central and became the Penn Central Transportation Company, or "Penn Central" for short. The former competitors' networks, however, integrated poorly with each other, and within two years of the merger, Penn Central filed for bankruptcy.

Bankruptcy continued and on April 1, 1976, the railroad gave up its rail assets, along with the assets of several other failing northeastern railroads, to a new railroad named Consolidated Rail Corporation, or Conrail for short. Conrail was itself purchased and split up in 1999 between the Norfolk Southern Railway and CSX Transportation, with Norfolk Southern getting 58 percent of the system, including nearly all of the remaining former Pennsylvania Railroad trackage. Amtrak received the electrified segment of the Main Line east of Harrisburg.

The Penn Central Corporation held several non-rail assets which it continued to manage after the formation of Conrail. It reorganized in 1994 as American Premier Underwriters, which continues to operate as a property and casualty insurance company.

== History ==
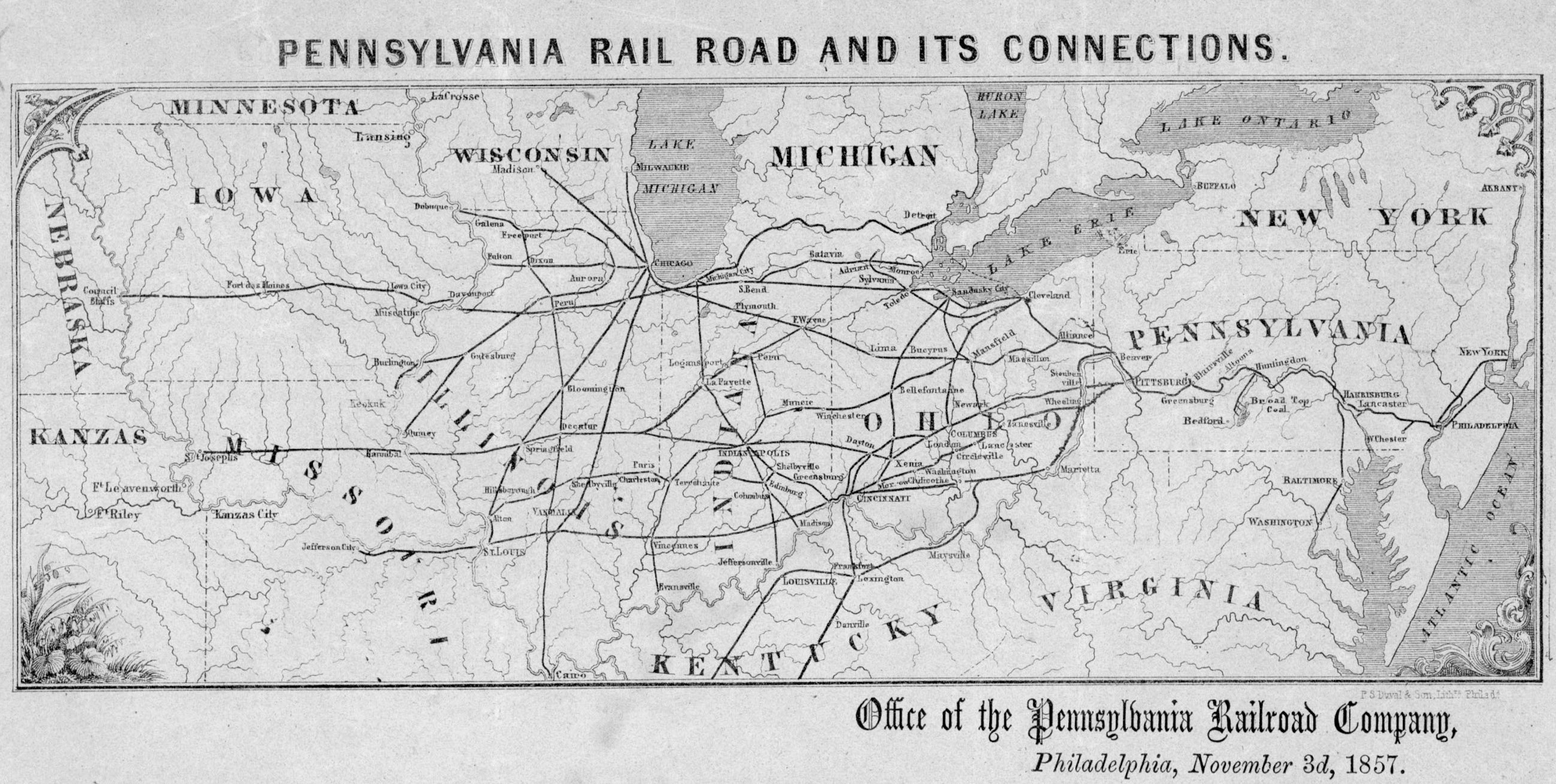
An 1857 map of the Pennsylvania Railroad and its connections

=== Beginnings ===
With the opening of the Erie Canal in 1825 and the beginnings of the Chesapeake and Ohio Canal in 1828, Philadelphia business interests became concerned that the port of Philadelphia would lose traffic. The state legislature was pressed to build a canal across Pennsylvania, and thus the Main Line of Public Works was commissioned in 1826. It soon became evident that a single canal would not be practical, and a series of railroads, inclined planes, and canals were proposed. The route consisted of the Philadelphia and Columbia Railroad, canals up the Susquehanna and Juniata rivers, an inclined plane railroad called the Allegheny Portage Railroad, a tunnel across the Allegheny Mountains, and canals down the Conemaugh and Allegheny rivers to Pittsburgh, Pennsylvania, on the Ohio River; it was completed in 1834. Because freight and passengers had to change conveyances several times along the route and canals froze in winter, it soon became apparent that the system was cumbersome, and a better way was needed.

There were two applications made to the Pennsylvania legislature in 1846. The first was for a new railroad called "The Pennsylvania Railroad Company" to build a line between Harrisburg and Pittsburgh, Pennsylvania. The second was the Baltimore and Ohio Railroad (B&O), which wanted to build to Pittsburgh from Cumberland, Maryland. Both applications were granted with conditions. If the Pennsylvania Railroad did not raise enough capital and contract to build enough railroad within a year, then the B&O bill would become effective and the Pennsy's void, thereby allowing the B&O to build into Pennsylvania and on to Pittsburgh. The Pennsylvania Railroad fulfilled the requirements and Letters Patent were issued by the Pennsylvania governor on February 25, 1847. The governor declared the B&O's rights void the following August.

=== Early years ===
In 1847, the Pennsy's directors chose J. Edgar Thomson, an engineer from the Georgia Railroad, to survey and construct the line. He chose a route that followed the west bank of the Susquehanna River northward to the confluence with the Juniata River, following its banks until the foothills of the Allegheny Mountains were reached at a point that would become Altoona, Pennsylvania. To traverse the mountains, the line would climb a moderate grade for 10 miles (16 km) until it reached a split of two mountain ravines which were crossed by building a fill and having the tracks ascend a 220-degree curve known as Horseshoe Curve that limited the grade to less than 2 percent. The crest of the mountain would be penetrated by the 3,612 ft (1,101 m) Gallitzin Tunnels, from which the route descended by a more moderate grade to Johnstown.

The western end of the line was simultaneously built from Pittsburgh, eastward along the Allegheny and Conemaugh rivers to Johnstown, while the eastern end was built from Harrisburg to Altoona. In 1848, the Pennsy contracted with the Harrisburg, Portsmouth, Mountjoy and Lancaster Railroad (HPMtJ&L) to buy and use equipment over both roads, providing service from Harrisburg east to Lancaster. In 1851, tracks were completed between Pittsburgh and Johnstown. In 1852, a continuous railroad line ran between Philadelphia and Pittsburgh over the tracks of several entities including the Pennsylvania Railroad. In 1853, the Pennsy was granted trackage rights over the Philadelphia and Columbia, providing a connection between the two cities and connecting with the HPMtJ&L at Lancaster and Columbia. By 1854, the Pennsy completed its line from Harrisburg to Pittsburgh, eliminating the use of the inclined planes of the Allegheny Portage Railroad.

In 1857, the PRR purchased the Main Line of Public Works from the state of Pennsylvania. This purchase included 275 miles (443 km) of canal, the Philadelphia & Columbia Railroad, and the New Portage Railroad (which replaced the now abandoned Allegheny Portage Railroad). The Pennsy abandoned most of the New Portage Railroad in 1857 as it was now redundant with the Pennsylvania Railroad's own line. In 1861, the Pennsy leased the HPMtJ&L to bring the entire stretch of road between Pittsburgh and Philadelphia under its control.

The Johnstown to Pittsburgh stretch of canal was abandoned in 1865 and the rest of the canals sold to the Pennsylvania Canal Company in 1866.

The main line was double track from its inception, and by the end of the century, a third and fourth track were added. Over the next 50 years, the Pennsy expanded by gaining control of other railroads by stock purchases and 999-year leases. (Note: In the years after the American Civil War, railroad leases were a common arrangement: a railroad contemplating an expansion, but reluctant to assume new risks or finance construction itself, would form a new railroad company or acquire a controlling interest in an existing company, lease the new railroad to itself (the "parent" railroad), and sell stock in the new corporation if necessary. The new line was frequently operated as if it was an integral part of the parent company. See John F. Meck, Jr., and John E. Masten, "Railroad Leases and Reorganization: I ", Yale Law Journal 49:626-659, (1940) pp. 630-31.) At the end of its first year of operation, the Pennsylvania Railroad paid a dividend and continued the dividend without interruption until 1946.

=== Expansion ===
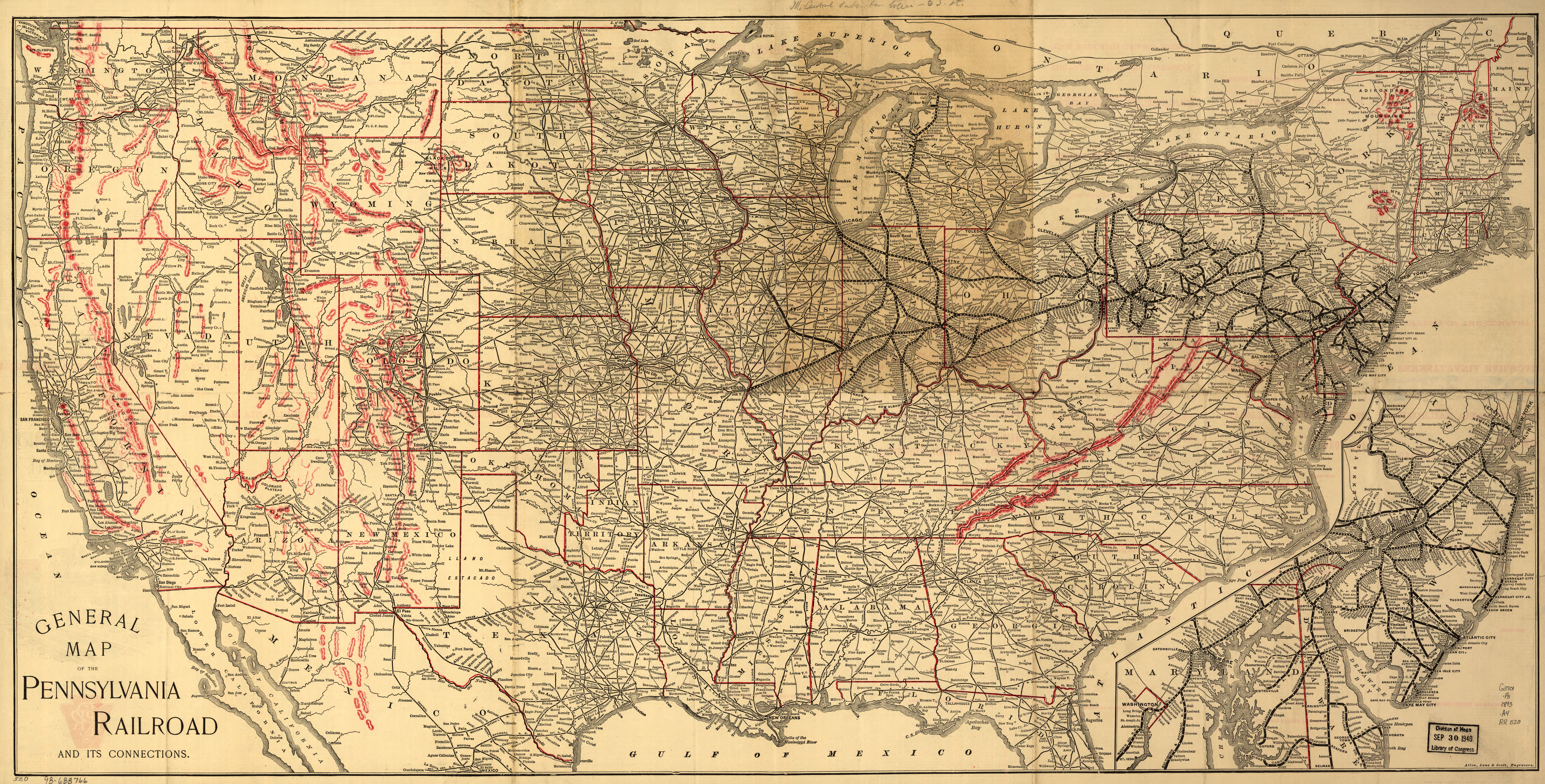
A map of the Pennsylvania Railroad system and its connections as of 1893

The Pennsy's charter was supplemented on March 23, 1853, to allow it to purchase stock and guarantee bonds of railroads in other states, up to a percentage of its capital stock. Several lines were then aided by the Pennsy in hopes to secure additional traffic. By the end of 1854, the Pennsy purchased stock in the Ohio & Pennsylvania, Ohio & Indiana, Marietta & Cincinnati, Maysville & Big Sandy, and Springfield, Mt. Vernon & Pittsburgh railroads, totalling $1,450,000 (equivalent to $52 million in 2025). The Steubenville & Indiana was assisted by the Pennsy in the form of a guarantee of $500,000 worth of bonds. In 1856, a controlling interest was purchased in the Cumberland Valley Railroad and the Pennsy constructed additional lines in Philadelphia. In 1857, the aforementioned Main Line of Public Works was purchased for $7,500,000 ($259 million in 2025).

=== Empire Transportation Company ===
The Empire Transportation Company was founded in 1865 by Joseph D. Potts and became a multi-modal freight transportation subsidiary of the Pennsylvania Railroad. It owned oil tanker cars and used them to transport refined oil for mostly independent oil refiners during the era of John D. Rockefeller's and Standard Oil's oil refinery mergers of the 1870s. The company also owned grain freight boats on the Great Lakes and oil pipelines in the oil regions of Pennsylvania. When the company attempted to buy and build some oil refineries in 1877, Standard Oil bought the company.

=== 1860–1960 ===
Revenue freight traffic, in millions of net ton-miles (Note: Totals for Pennsylvania Lines; not included are the following independently operated lines: Long Island Railroad, West Jersey & Seashore/Pennsylvania-Reading Seashore Lines, Pennsylvania & Atlantic, Baltimore, Chesapeake & Atlantic, Baltimore & Eastern, Ohio River & Western, Philadelphia & Beach Haven, Rosslyn Connecting, and Waynesburg & Washington, which added up to 21 million ton-miles in 1925.)
Year	Traffic
1925	44,864
1925	48,890
1933	26,818
1944	71,249
1960	42,775
1967	50,730

Revenue passenger traffic, in millions of passenger-miles (Note: Totals for Pennsylvania Lines; Long Island Railroad and West Jersey & Seashore/Pennsylvania-Reading Seashore Lines not included.)
Year	Traffic
1920	7,325
1925	4,518
1933	2,017
1944	13,047
1960	2,463
1967	1,757

- 1846: The Pennsylvania Railroad Company is chartered to construct a rail line from Harrisburg to Pittsburgh, Pennsylvania.
- 1850s: Renamed the Pennsylvania Central Railway.
- 1850: Construction begins on Altoona Works repair shop at Altoona, Pennsylvania.
- 1857: The Main Line of Public Works of Pennsylvania purchased.
- 1865: First US railroad to use steel rails.
- 1868: The Pittsburgh, Cincinnati and St. Louis Railway is formed and controlled by the Pennsy.
- 1869: Leases the Pittsburgh, Fort Wayne and Chicago Railway, formally giving it control of a direct route into the heart of the Midwestern United States and Chicago, Illinois.
- 1870: "Pennsylvania Central" is split into lines east (renamed Pennsylvania Railroad) and lines west Pennsylvania Company is formed to hold securities from companies West of Pittsburgh; Use of track pans begins on PRR at Sang Hollow, Pennsylvania; Pennsy reaches Cincinnati, Ohio, with lease of Little Miami and St. Louis, Missouri, with control of the St. Louis, Vandalia & Terre Haute.
- 1871: Pennsylvania Railroad reaches Jersey City, New Jersey, and the New York City area via lease of the United New Jersey Railroad and Canal Company.
- 1872: Airbrakes were first used on the Pennsylvania Railroad.
- 1873: Pennsy reaches Washington, D.C., via the Baltimore & Potomac Railroad.
- 1877: Thomas A. Watson demonstrates telephone to PRR officials at Altoona; Pittsburgh Riots destroys property of Pennsylvania Railroad at Pittsburgh, Pennsylvania.
- 1881: Pennsy purchases control of Philadelphia, Wilmington, and Baltimore Railroad thereby providing a direct route between Philadelphia, Baltimore, and Washington, D.C., access to Delmarva Peninsula; Broad Street Station opens.
- 1885: The Congressional Limited Express from New York to Washington is introduced
- 1887: Pennsylvania Limited service begins between New York and Chicago; first vestibuled train.
- 1900: The Pennsy gains access to Buffalo, New York, via lease of Western New York & Pennsylvania
- 1902: Pennsylvania Special service begins between New York and Chicago replacing the Pennsylvania Limited
- 1906: An accident in Atlantic City kills 53 people
- 1907: Washington Union Station in Washington, D.C., completed
- 1910: Completion of the North River Tunnels under the Hudson River, providing direct service from New Jersey to Manhattan on electrified lines, terminating at the massive new Penn Station
- 1912: The second vice-president of the PRR, John B. Thayer, died in the sinking of the RMS Titanic aged 49
- 1912: Broadway Limited was inaugurated, replacing the Pennsylvania Special
- 1915: The Pennsylvania electrifies its suburban Philadelphia lines to Paoli, Pennsylvania; PRR Position-Light signals first used, between Overbrook and Bryn Mawr, Pennsylvania.
- 1916: The Pennsy adopts new motto, "Standard Railroad of the World"; The first I1s Decapod locomotive is completed, and switching locomotives of the A5s and B6sb class are introduced
- 1917: Completion of the New York Connecting Railroad and the Hell Gate Bridge speed access to New England
- 1918: Pennsy stock bottoms at $40¼ (equal to $861.55 today), the lowest since 1877, due largely to Federal railroad control; Emergency freight is routed through New York Penn Station and the Hudson River tunnels by the USRA to relieve congestion; The Pennsy electrifies suburban commuter line to Chestnut Hill, Pennsylvania
- 1925: Chicago Union Station opens
- 1928–1938: The Pennsylvania electrifies its New York City to Washington, D.C., and Chicago to Philadelphia lines between Harrisburg and Paoli, several Philadelphia and New York City area commuter lines, and major through freight lines
- 1937: Pennsy acquires its first diesel, a model SW switcher engine from Electro-Motive Corporation
- 1943: An accident at Frankford Junction, Pennsylvania, kills 79
- 1946: Pennsylvania Railroad reports a net loss for the first time in its history
- 1951: An accident in Woodbridge, New Jersey, kills 85 people
- 1957: Steam locomotives are removed from active service in the PRR fleet; merger talks begin with the New York Central Railroad
- 1968: PRR expands to New York City, and eventually changes its name to Penn Central Transportation Company (PC)

=== Demise ===
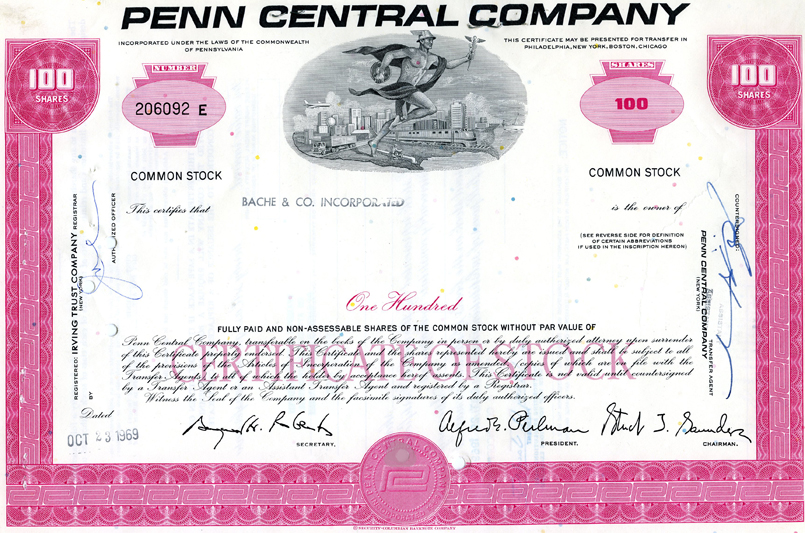
A Penn Central Company stock certificate in 1969

The controlling, non-institutional shareholders of the PRR during the early 1960s were Henry Stryker Taylor, who was a part of the Jacob Bunn business dynasty of Illinois, and Howard Butcher III, a principal in the Philadelphia brokerage house of Butcher & Sherrerd (later Butcher & Singer).

On February 1, 1968, the Pennsylvania Railroad merged with its longtime arch-rival, the New York Central Railroad. The Pennsylvania Railroad absorbed the New York Central and eventually went by the name of Penn Central Transportation Company.

The Interstate Commerce Commission (ICC) required that the ailing New York, New Haven & Hartford Railroad (NH) be added in 1969. A series of events including inflation, poor management, abnormally harsh weather, and the withdrawal of a government-guaranteed $200 million operating loan forced Penn Central to file for bankruptcy protection on June 21, 1970. In May 1971, passenger operations, including equipment, were transferred to a new government-subsidized company called the National Railroad Passenger Corporation, or Amtrak. This was devised to relieve the Penn Central (and other railroads) of money-losing passenger service. Penn Central rail lines, including ex-Pennsy lines, were transferred to Conrail in 1976, and eventually Amtrak received the Northeast Corridor and Keystone Corridor lines.

After Conrail was divided between the Norfolk Southern Railway and CSX Transportation, most of the former Pennsy's remaining trackage went to Norfolk Southern. The few parts of the Pennsylvania Railroad that went to CSX after the Conrail split were:

- The western end of the Fort Wayne Line across western Ohio and northern Indiana.
- Pope's Creek Secondary in Maryland, just to the east of Washington, DC.
- Landover Subdivision, a former Pennsy freight line in the DC area connecting Amtrak's ex-Pennsy Northeast Corridor and CSX's ex-B&O Alexandria Extension on the north end and CSX's RF&P Subdivision on the south end via the ex-Pennsy "Long Bridge" across the Potomac River.
- Terre Haute, Indiana-to-East St. Louis, Illinois segment of the St. Louis main line; the segment east of Terre Haute was formerly a New York Central line.

After 1976, the Penn Central Corporation held diversified non-rail assets including the Buckeye Pipeline and a stake in Madison Square Garden. The company began to acquire a portfolio of insurance companies in 1988. In 1994, the company reorganized as American Premier Underwriters, a subsidiary of American Financial Group, which continues to operate as a property and casualty insurance company as-of January 2024.

== Presidents ==
=== J. Edgar Thomson ===
John Edgar Thomson (1808–1874) was the entrepreneur who led the Pennsylvania Railroad from 1852 until his death in 1874, making it the largest business enterprise in the world and a world-class model for technological and managerial innovation. He served as the Pennsy's first Chief Engineer and third President. Thomson's sober, technical, methodical, and non-ideological personality had an important influence on the Pennsylvania Railroad, which in the mid-19th century was on the technical cutting edge of rail development, while nonetheless reflecting Thomson's personality in its conservatism and its steady growth while avoiding financial risks. His Pennsylvania Railroad was in his day the largest railroad in the world, with 6,000 miles of track, and was famous for steady financial dividends, high quality construction, constantly improving equipment, technological advances (such as replacing wood fuel with coal), and innovation in management techniques for a large complex organization.

The railroad's other presidents were:

- Samuel V. Merrick, (March 31, 1847 – September 1, 1849)
- William C. Patterson, (September 1, 1849 – February 2, 1852)
- John Edgar Thomson, (February 3, 1852 – May 27, 1874)
- Thomas A. Scott, (June 3, 1874 – June 1, 1880)
- George B. Roberts, (June 1, 1880 – January 30, 1897)
- Frank Thomson (February 3, 1897 – June 5, 1899)
- Alexander J. Cassatt (June 9, 1899 – December 28, 1906)
- James McCrea (January 2, 1907 – January 1, 1913)
- Samuel Rea (January 1, 1913 – October 1, 1925)
- William W. Atterbury (October 1, 1925 – April 24, 1935)
- Martin W. Clement (April 24, 1935 – June 16, 1949)
- Walter S. Franklin (June 16, 1949 – May 31, 1954)
- James M. Symes (May 31, 1954 – November 1, 1959)
- Allen J. Greenough (November 1, 1959 – January 31, 1968)

The Pennsylvania Railroad's board chairman/CEOs were:

- Martin W. Clement (June 16, 1949 – December 31, 1951)
- James M. Symes (November 1, 1959 – October 1, 1963)
- Stuart T. Saunders (October 1, 1963 – January 31, 1968)

The railroad's only vice-president was:

- Elisha Lee

== Major routes ==
=== Main Line ===
The Pennsy's main line extended from Philadelphia to Pittsburgh, Pennsylvania.

=== New York, Philadelphia, Baltimore, and Washington lines ===
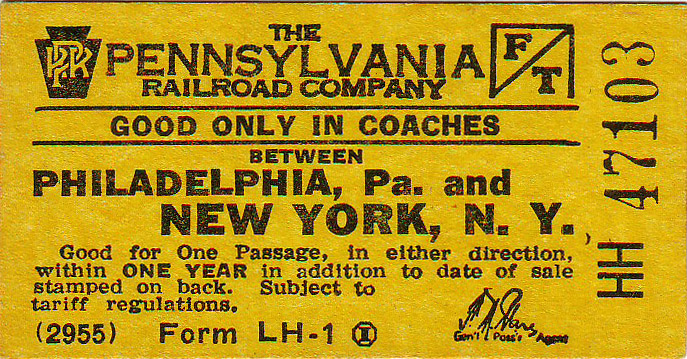
A PRR one-way coach ticket between Philadelphia and New York, c. 1955

In 1861, the Pennsylvania Railroad gained control of the Northern Central Railway, giving it access to Baltimore, Maryland, and points along the Susquehanna River via connections at Columbia, Pennsylvania, or Harrisburg, Pennsylvania.

On December 1, 1871, the Pennsy leased the United New Jersey Railroad and Canal Company, which included the original Camden and Amboy Railroad from Camden, New Jersey, across the Delaware River from Philadelphia, to South Amboy, New Jersey, across Raritan Bay from New York City, and a newer line from Philadelphia to Jersey City, New Jersey, much closer to New York City, via Trenton, New Jersey. Track connection in Philadelphia was made via the Pennsy's Connecting Railway and the jointly owned Junction Railroad.

The Pennsy's Baltimore and Potomac Rail Road opened on July 2, 1872, between Baltimore and Washington, D.C. This route required transfer via horse car in Baltimore to the other lines heading north from the city. On June 29, 1873, the Baltimore and Potomac Tunnel through Baltimore was completed. The Pennsylvania Railroad started the Pennsylvania Air Line service ("air line" at the time being understood as a nearly-straight and nearly-flat route with distance similar to "as the crow flies") via the Northern Central Railway and Columbia, Pennsylvania. This service was 54.5 miles (87.7 km) longer than the old route but avoided the transfer in Baltimore. The Union Railroad line opened on July 24, 1873. This route eliminated the transfer in Baltimore. Pennsy officials contracted with both the Union Railroad and the Philadelphia, Wilmington and Baltimore Railroad (PW&B) for access to this line. The Pennsy's New York–Washington trains began using the route the next day, ending Pennsylvania Air Line service. In the early 1880s, the Pennsylvania acquired a majority of PW&B Railroad's stock. This action forced the Baltimore and Ohio Railroad (B&O) to build the Baltimore and Philadelphia Railroad to keep its Philadelphia access, where it connected with the Reading Company for its competing Royal Blue Line passenger trains to reach New York City.

In 1885, the PRR began passenger train service from New York City via Philadelphia to Washington, D.C. with limited stops along the route. This service became known as the "Congressional Limited Express." The service expanded, and by the 1920s, the Pennsy was operating hourly passenger train service between New York, Philadelphia and Washington. In 1952, 18-car stainless steel streamliners were introduced on the Morning Congressional and Afternoon Congressional between New York and Washington, as well as the Senator from Boston to Washington.

=== New York–Chicago ===
On July 1, 1869, the Pennsylvania Railroad leased the Pittsburgh, Fort Wayne and Chicago Railway (PFtW&C) in which it had previously been an investor. The lease gave the Pennsy complete control of that line's direct route through northern Ohio and Indiana as well as entry into the emerging rail hub city of Chicago, Illinois. Acquisitions along the PFtW&C: Erie and Pittsburgh Railroad, Cleveland and Pittsburgh Railroad, Toledo, Columbus and Ohio River Railroad, and Pittsburgh, Youngstown and Ashtabula Railway gave the Pennsy access to the iron ore traffic on Lake Erie.

On June 15, 1887, the Pennsylvania Limited began running between New York and Chicago. This was also the introduction of the vestibule, an enclosed platform at the end of each passenger car, allowing protected access to the entire train. In 1902 the Pennsylvania Limited was replaced by the Pennsylvania Special which in turn was replaced in 1912 by the Broadway Limited which became the most famous train operated by the Pennsylvania Railroad. This train ran from New York City to Chicago, via Philadelphia, with an additional section between Harrisburg and Washington (later operated as a separate Washington–Chicago train, the Liberty Limited).

=== New York–St. Louis ===
In 1890, the Pennsylvania Railroad gained control of the Pittsburgh, Cincinnati, Chicago and St. Louis Railroad (PCC&StL), itself the merged product of numerous smaller lines in Ohio, Indiana, and Illinois. Commonly called the Panhandle Route, this line ran west from Pittsburgh to Bradford, Ohio, where it split, with one line to Chicago and the other to East St. Louis, Illinois, via Indianapolis, Indiana. In 1905, the acquisition of the Vandalia Railroad gave the Pennsy access across the Mississippi River to St. Louis, Missouri.

Double-tracked for much of its length, the line served the coal region of southern Illinois and as a passenger route for the Pennsylvania Railroad's Blue Ribbon named trains The St. Louisan, The Jeffersonian, and the Spirit of St. Louis.

=== "Low-grade" lines ===
By 1906, the Pennsylvania built several low-grade lines for freight to bypass areas of steep grade (slope) and avoid congestion. These included:

- 1871: The Western Pennsylvania Railroad completed its line from Blairsville to Allegheny City, Pennsylvania, and a connection with the Pittsburgh, Fort Wayne & Chicago
- 1874: The low-grade line of the Allegheny Valley Railroad from Driftwood to Red Bank, Pennsylvania
- 1877: The Port Perry Branch connecting the main line to Pennsylvania Railroad's Pittsburgh, Virginia and Charleston Railway near Pittsburgh
- 1890: The Ohio Connecting Railway is built by the Pennsylvania Railroad, providing a low-grade bypass around Pittsburgh via the Panhandle Route, PV&C, and Port Perry Branch (and via the Brilliant Cutoff and the Duff/Scully Branch at later dates)
- 1892: The Trenton Branch and Trenton Cut-Off Railroad from Glen Loch, Pennsylvania, east to Morrisville, Pennsylvania (not only a low-grade line but a long-distance shortcut and bypass of Philadelphia)
- 1904: Reopening of the New Portage Railroad from the Gallitzin Tunnel, east to New Portage Junction, then continuing north over the Hollidaysburg Branch to Altoona, or bypassing Altoona and continuing on the Petersburg Branch to Petersburg
- 1904: The Brilliant Cutoff between the main line and the Allegheny Valley Railway and Conemaugh Line
- 1905: The Scully Branch providing via a low-grade bypass on the Panhandle Route along Chartiers Creek
- 1906: Philadelphia and Thorndale Branch from Thorndale, Pennsylvania, east to Glen Loch (Note: Abandoned by Conrail in 1989.)
- 1906: Atglen and Susquehanna Branch from Harrisburg via the Northern Central Railway, south to Wago Junction, then east to Parkesburg, Pennsylvania. (Note: The latter abandoned by Conrail in 1990.)

Some other lines were planned, but never completed:

- The Pennsylvania and Newark Railroad was incorporated in 1905 to build a low-grade line from Morrisville, Pennsylvania, to Colonia, New Jersey. It was never completed, but some work was done in the Trenton area, including bridge piers in the Delaware River. North of Colonia, the alignment was going to be separate, but instead two extra tracks were added to the existing line. Work was suspended in 1916.
- A low-grade line was planned between Radebaugh (near Greensburg) and Derry, Pennsylvania. Work was begun on this line, but it was never completed.
- A low-grade route across the Allegheny Mountains of Pennsylvania, bypassing the congestion at Pittsburgh, was contemplated but never built. It would have used existing segments of the Northern Central Railway, Philadelphia and Erie Railroad, and Allegheny Valley Railway's Low Grade Division. Then, new construction would have connected from Red Bank to the Fort Wayne Line at Enon. The Western Allegheny Railroad later ran over a route similar to the envisioned new line, and was for a time owned by the Pennsylvania Railroad, which, it seems, purchased it for this planned bypass.

== Infrastructure ==
=== Track gauge ===
The company initially adopted several track gauges to facilitate connections to other railroads. Eastern tracks were laid to 4 ft 9 in (1,448 mm), a variant on the widely used standard gauge of 4 ft 8 1/2 in (1,435 mm), while a gauge of 4 ft 9 1/2 in (1,461 mm) was utilized in the west to connect to lines in Ohio, which utilized the Ohio gauge of 4 ft 10 in (1,473 mm). The railroad's importance led to many connecting roads being built to the same widths and the railroads of Ohio were generally reduced in width to allow more interoperability. The small discrepancies from standard gauge generally allowed equipment to be run on either gauge track, and the railroad would build different routes to either standard. Lines which moved primarily passengers were generally laid to standard gauge, while freight routes were laid to the wider 4 ft 9 in (1,448 mm) in an effort to reduce rolling resistance. When several southern railroads regauged in 1886, they chose to reduce their 5 ft (1,524 mm) gauge by respiking rails 3 inches (76 mm) closer, bringing them to the same standard as the Pennsylvania Railroad. The company maintained the wider gauge until the 1910s, when most lines were redefined to standard gauge.

=== Electrification ===
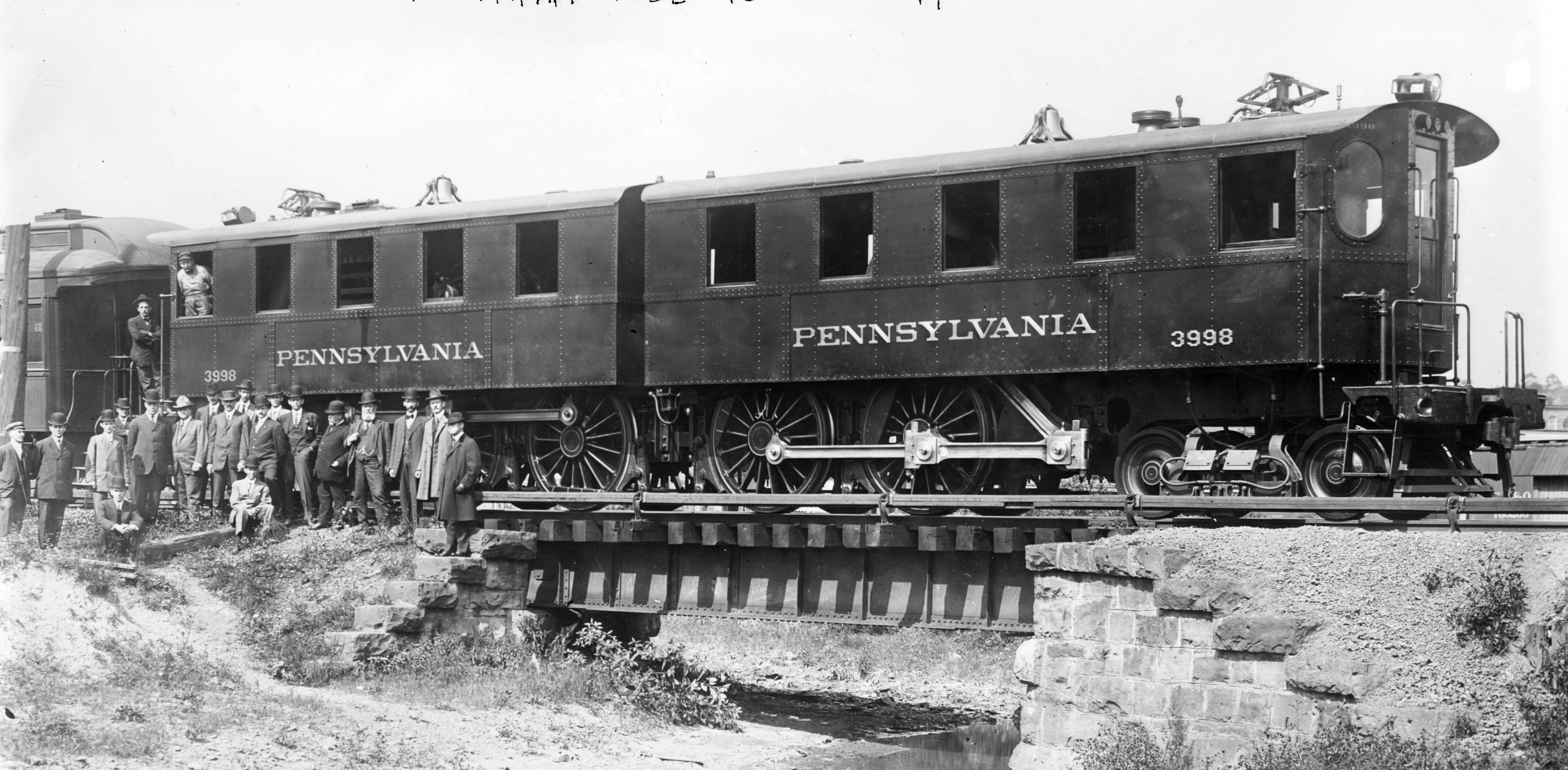
A DD1 electric locomotive used in the New York City terminal area and tunnels

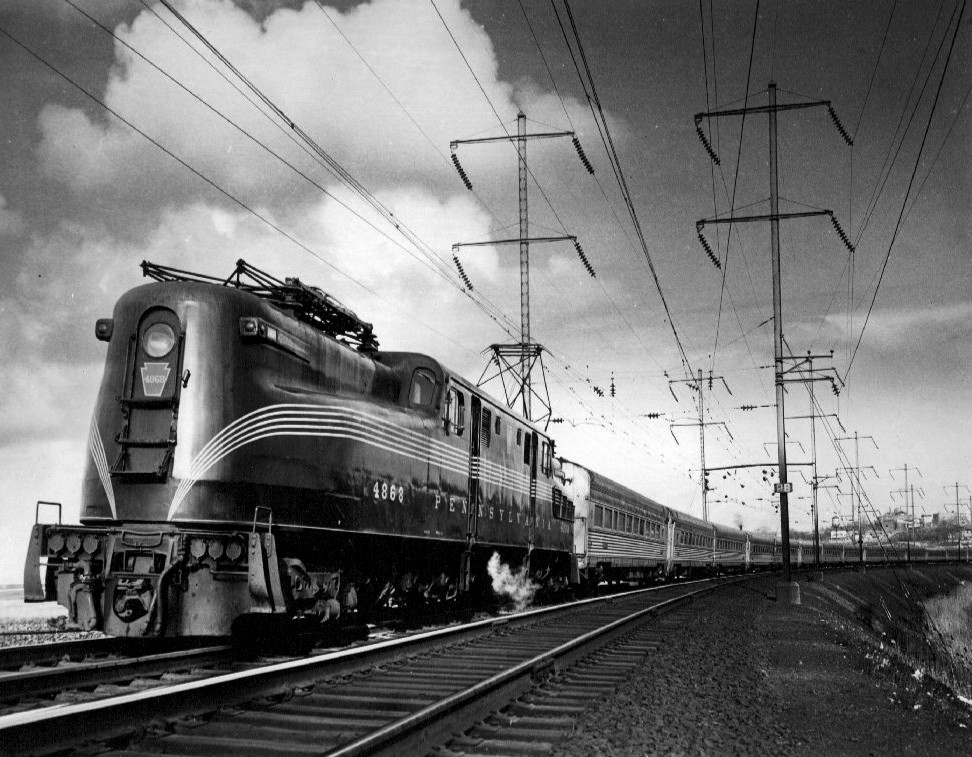
A GG1 electric locomotive pulls The Congressional out of the North River Tunnels, 1965

Early in the 20th century, the Pennsy tried electric power for its trains. Its first effort was in the New York terminal area, where tunnels and a city law restricting the burning of coal precluded steam locomotives. In 1910, the railroad began operating a direct current (DC) 650-volt system whose third-rail powered Pennsy locomotives (and LIRR passenger cars) used to enter Penn Station in New York City via the Hudson River tunnels.

The next area to be electrified was the Philadelphia terminal area, where Pennsy officials decided to use overhead lines to supply power to the suburban trains running out of Broad Street Station. Unlike the New York terminal system, overhead wires would carry 11,000-volt 25-Hertz alternating current (AC) power, which became the standard for future installations. On September 12, 1915, electrification of the line from Philadelphia to Paoli, Pennsylvania, was completed. Other Philadelphia lines electrified were the Chestnut Hill Branch (March 30, 1918), White Marsh (1924), the main line to Wilmington, Delaware (September 30, 1928), West Chester (December 2, 1928), Trenton line (June 29, 1930), and completed on July 20, 1930, the Schuylkill Branch to Norristown, Pennsylvania, later followed by the rest of the main line to Trenton, New Jersey.

In 1928, PRR's president William Wallace Atterbury announced plans to electrify the lines between New York, Philadelphia, Washington, and Harrisburg. In January 1933, through main-line service between New York and Philadelphia/Wilmington/Paoli was placed in operation. The first test run of an electric train between Philadelphia and Washington occurred on January 28, 1935. On February 1, the Congressional in both directions were the first trains in regular electric operation between New York and Washington, drawn by the first of the GG1-type locomotives.

In 1934, the Pennsylvania received a $77 million loan from the New Deal's Public Works Administration to complete the electrification project begun in 1928. Work was started January 27, 1937, on the main line from Paoli to Harrisburg; the low-grade freight line from Morrisville through Columbia to Enola Yard in Pennsylvania; the Port Road Branch from Perryville, Maryland, to Columbia; the Jamesburg Branch and Amboy Secondary freight line from Monmouth Junction to South Amboy; and the Landover-South End freight line from Landover, Maryland, through Washington to Potomac Yard in Alexandria, Virginia. (Note: Now called the Landover Subdivision and RF&P Subdivision of CSX.) In less than a year, on January 15, 1938, the first passenger train, the Metropolitan, went into operation over the newly electrified line from Philadelphia to Harrisburg. On April 15, the electrified freight service from Harrisburg and Enola Yard east was inaugurated, thus completing the Pennsy's eastern seaboard electrification program. The railroad had electrified 2,677 miles (4,308 km) of its track, representing 41% of the country's electrically operated standard railroad trackage. Portions of the electrified trackage are still in use, owned and operated by Amtrak as the Northeast Corridor and Keystone Corridor high-speed rail routes, by SEPTA, and by NJ Transit.

== Equipment ==
The Pennsylvania Railroad's corporate symbol was the keystone, the Commonwealth of Pennsylvania's state symbol, with the letters "PRR" intertwined inside. When colored, it was bright red with a silver-grey inline and lettering.

=== Freight cars ===
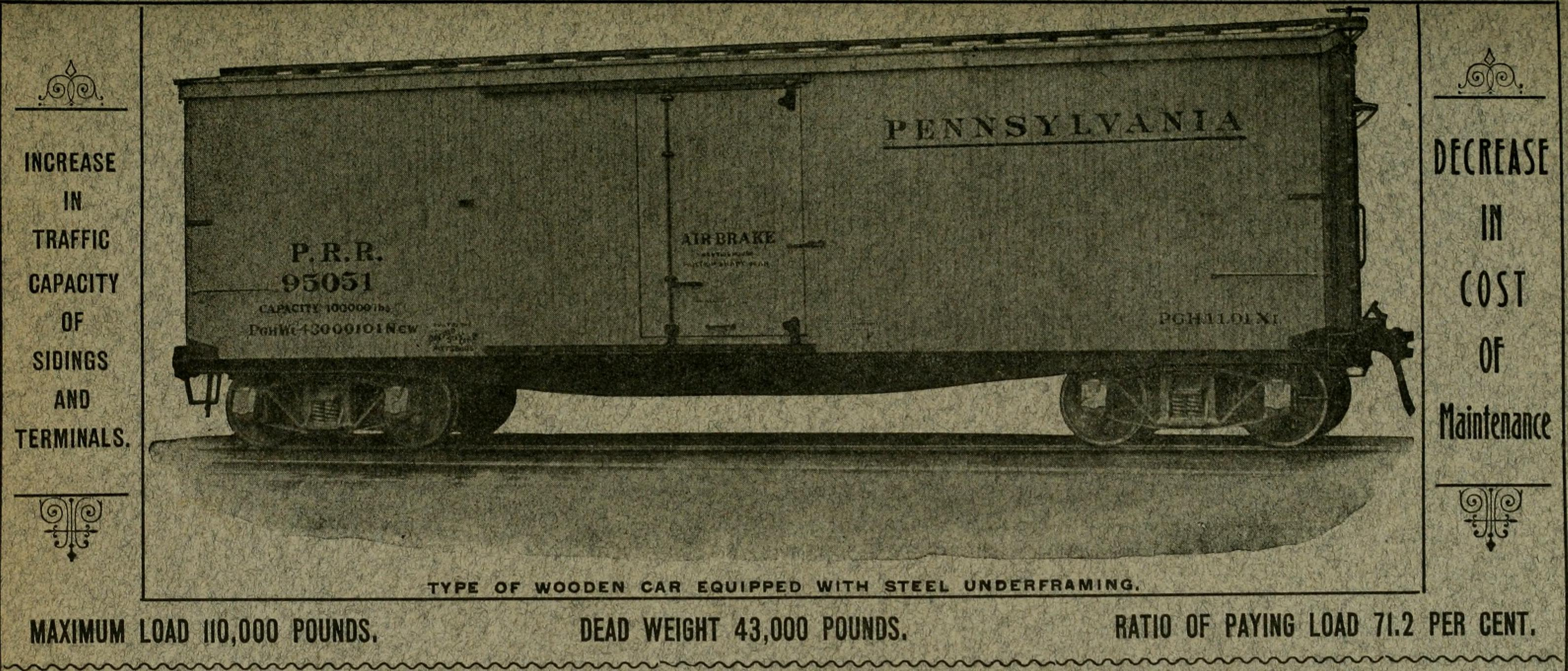
A PRR wooden freight car with steel underframe

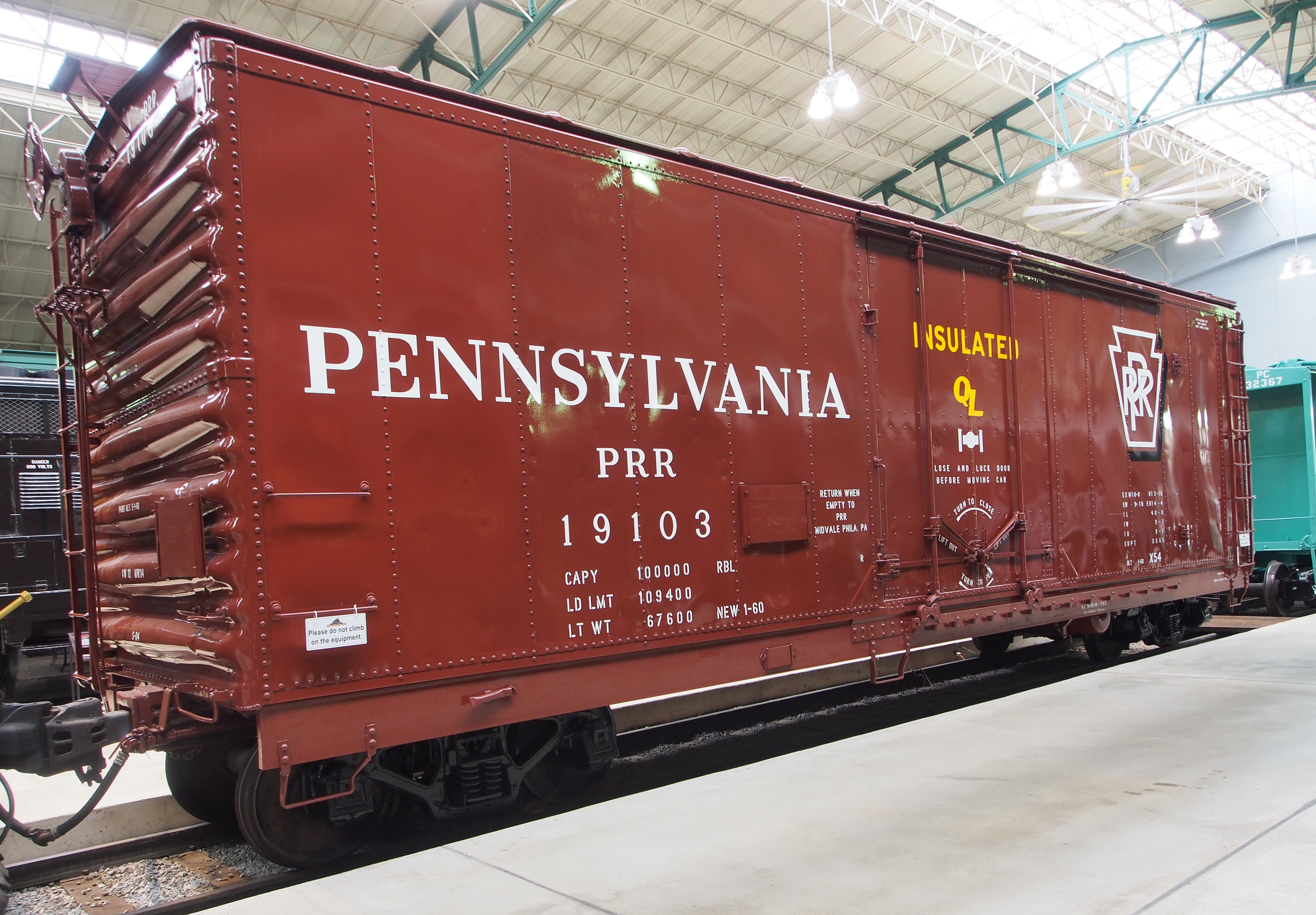
The PRR boxcar No. 19103 at the Railroad Museum of Pennsylvania

The Pennsylvania Railroad bought its first 75 freight cars in 1849. Two years later, the Pennsy owned 439 freight cars. By 1857, it had 1,861 cars, and in 1866, 9,379 cars. Freight equipment was either acquired new from builders or built by the railroad itself.

The Pennsy acquired more cars from the railroads it absorbed. In some instances, privately owned cars were either purchased from a builder or railroad acquisition. One such example was the 1877 purchase of Empire Transportation merchandise and oil cars.

By the mid-1860s, the railroad had 9,379 freight cars; a decade later, 32,718; the mid-1880s, over 49,000; 1896, more than 87,000.

The Pennsy changed its car reporting methods around 1900. The railroads owned and operated by the Pennsylvania Railroad system were now included in reports, in addition to the Pennsylvania Railroad proper. So, in 1900, the Pennsy had over 180,000 freight cars; by 1910, 263,039. The zenith of freight car ownership was reached in 1919 when the Pennsy owned a reported 282,729 freight cars.

Steel in freight car construction began during the later part of the 19th century, when cars were now being built with a steel underframe and wooden bodies or were all steel. The Pennsy steadily replaced their wooden cars with steel versions until there were no more wooden cars by 1934.

During the first quarter of the 20th century, the average capacity of a Pennsylvania Railroad freight car increased from 31 to 54 short tons (28 to 48 long tons; 28 to 49 t). This increased to 55 short tons (49 long tons; 50 t) in the mid-1930s and then to 56 short tons (50 long tons; 51 t) in 1945.

By the start of 1946, the Pennsy's freight car ownership decreased to 240,293 cars and in 1963, down to 140,535. The Pennsylvania Railroad used a classification system for their freight cars. Similar to their locomotives, the Pennsy used a letter system to designate the various types and sub-types of freight and maintenance cars.

A — Tank
F — Flat
G — Gondola
H — Hopper
R — Refrigerator
K — Stock
N — Cabin (Caboose)
S — Poling
T — Tool
U — Side Dump
W — Wreck Crane
X — Box
Y — Test Weight
Z — Business

=== Paint schemes ===
As noted, Pennsy colors and paint schemes were standardized. Locomotives were painted in a shade of green so dark it seemed almost black. The official name for this color was DGLE (Dark Green Locomotive Enamel), though often referred to as "Brunswick Green." The undercarriage of the locomotives was painted in black, referred to as "True Black." The passenger cars of the Pennsy were painted Tuscan red, a brick-colored shade of red. Some electric locomotives and most passenger-hauling diesel locomotives were also painted in Tuscan Red. Freight cars of the Pennsy had their own color, known as "Freight Car Color," an iron-oxide shade of red. On passenger locomotives and cars, the lettering and outlining was originally done in real gold leaf. After World War II, the lettering was done in a light shade of gold, called Buff yellow.

=== Locomotives ===
==== Steam ====
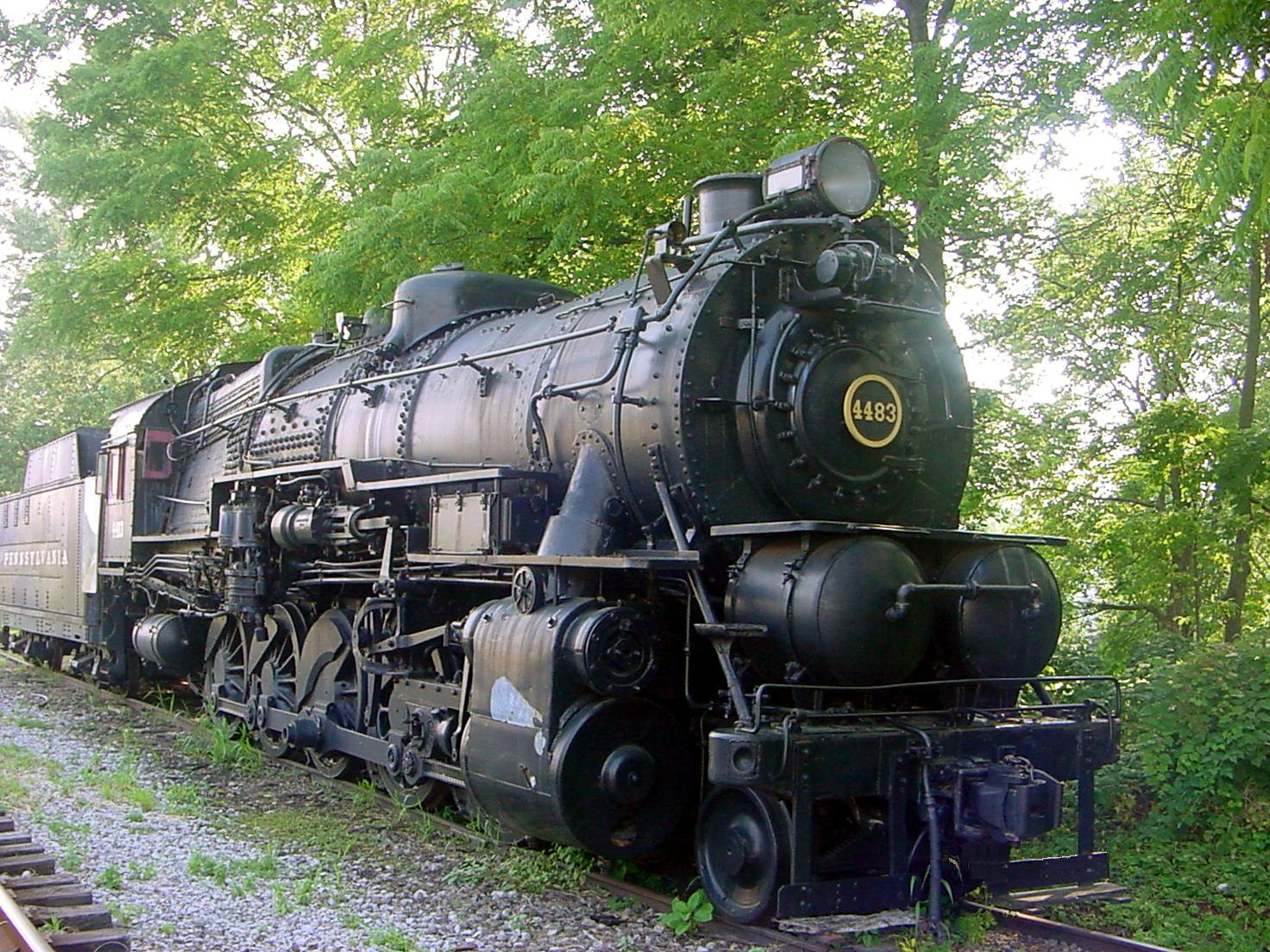
PRR I1sa #4483 on display at Hamburg, New York

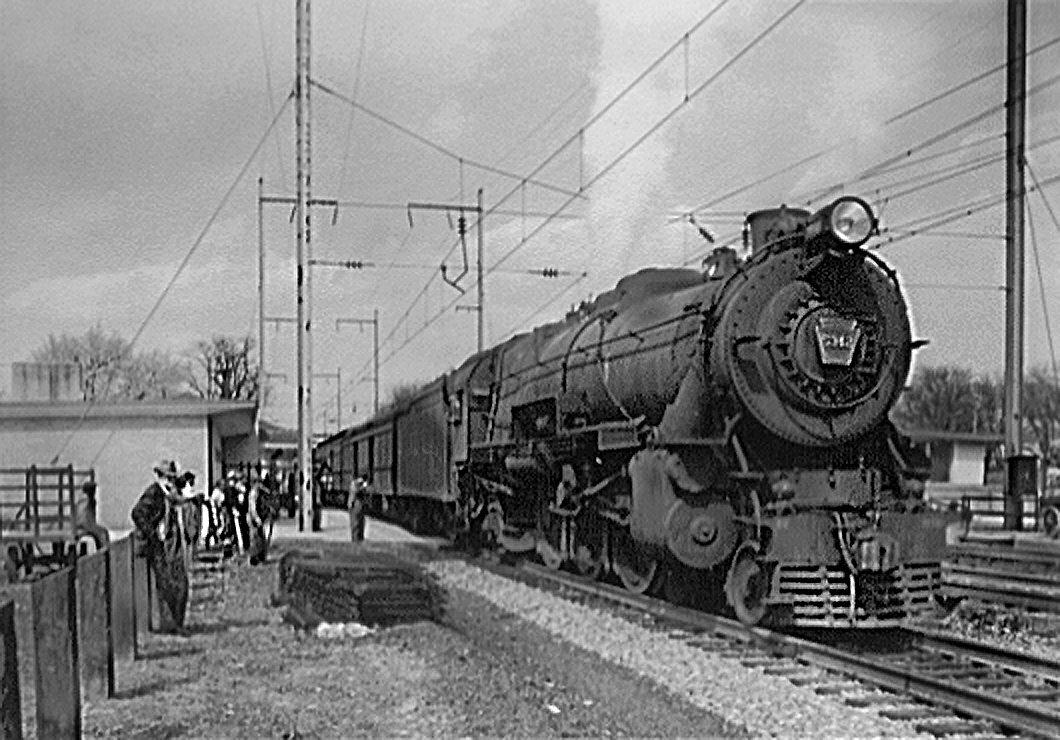
A K4 stopping with a passenger train at Aberdeen, Maryland in April 1944

For most of its existence, the Pennsylvania Railroad was conservative in its locomotive choices and pursued standardization, both in locomotive types and their component parts. Almost alone among U.S. railroads, the Pennsy designed most of its steam locomotive classes itself. It built most of them at Altoona Works, outsourcing only when Pennsy facilities could not keep up with the railroad's needs. In such cases, subcontractors were hired to build to PRR designs, unlike most railroads that ordered to broad specifications and left most design choices to the builder.

The Pennsy's favorite outsourced locomotive builder was Baldwin Locomotive Works, which received its raw materials and shipped out its finished products on Pennsy lines. The two companies, both headquartered in Philadelphia; Pennsy and Baldwin management and engineers knew each other well. When the Pennsy and Baldwin shops were at capacity, orders went to the Lima Locomotive Works in Lima, Ohio. Only as a last resort would the Pennsy use the American Locomotive Company (Alco), based in Schenectady, New York, which also built for Pennsy's rival, the New York Central.

The Pennsylvania Railroad had a design style that it favored in its locomotives. One example was the square-shouldered Belpaire firebox. This British-style firebox was a Pennsy trademark that was rarely used by other locomotive builders in the United States. The Pennsy also used track pans extensively to retrieve water for the locomotive while in motion. Using this system meant that the tenders of their locomotives had a comparatively large proportion of coal (which could not be taken on board while running) compared to water capacity. Locomotives of the Pennsylvania had a relatively clean look to them. Only necessary devices were used, and they were mounted neatly on the locomotive. Smoke box fronts bore a round locomotive number board denoting a freight locomotive or a keystone number board denoting a passenger locomotive. Otherwise, the smoke box was uncluttered except for a headlamp at the top and a steam-driven dynamo generator behind it. In later years the positions of the two were reversed, since the generator needed more maintenance than the lamp.

Each class of steam locomotive was assigned a class designation. Early on this was simply a letter, but when these ran short the scheme was changed so that each wheel arrangement had its own letter, and different types in the same arrangement had different numbers added to the letter. Sub-types were indicated by a lower-case letter; super-heating was designated by an "s" until the mid-1920s, by which time all new locomotives were super-heated. A K4sa class was a 4-6-2 "Pacific" type (K) of the fourth class of Pacifics designed by the Pennsy. It was super-heated (s) and was of the first variant type (a) after the original (unlettered). Steam locomotives remained part of the Pennsy fleet until 1957.

The Pennsy's reliance on steam locomotives in the mid-20th century contributed to its decline. Steam locomotives require more maintenance than diesel locomotives, are less cost efficient, and require more personnel to operate. Plus, coaling and watering facilities and machine shops added greatly to steam-related costs. Like other railroads, the Pennsy was unable to update its roster at will during the World War II years; by the end of the war their roster was in rough shape. In addition, the Pennsy was saddled with unsuccessful experimental steam locomotives such as the Q1, S1, and T1 "Duplex Drive" locomotives, and the S2 turbine locomotive. Unlike most of their competition, the Pennsy did not acquire any Northerns or Berkshires.

Pennsy competitors managed this period better with their diesel locomotive rosters. The Pennsylvania Railroad voluntarily preserved a roundhouse full of representative steam locomotives at Northumberland, Pennsylvania in 1957 and kept them there for several decades. These locomotives, with the exception of I1sa #4483 which is on display at Hamburg, New York, are now at the Railroad Museum of Pennsylvania in Strasburg, Pennsylvania. In sharp contrast, the New York Central's President, Alfred E. Perlman, deliberately scrapped all but two steam locomotives, with the older one (L2d) surviving only by accident.

On December 18, 1987, the State of Pennsylvania designated the Pennsy's K4s as the official State Steam Locomotive. The two surviving K4s are No. 1361, which is undergoing restoration to operating condition at the Railroaders Memorial Museum in Altoona, and No. 3750, which remains on static display at the Pennsylvania Railroad Museum in Strasburg.

As of 2020 the only operable Pennsylvania Railroad steam locomotive is class B4a engine # 643, built in June 1901 in Altoona. Engine 643 is maintained by volunteers of the Williams Grove Historical Steam Engine Association outside of Harrisburg and is operated several weekends each summer. As of 2020 however, a major construction project has been underway since 2014, building a new operational example of a class T1 engine numbered 5550, as all original class T1 locomotives have been scrapped. The project is being undertaken by the Pennsylvania Railroad T1 Steam Locomotive Trust and is projected to be finished by 2030.

==== Electric ====
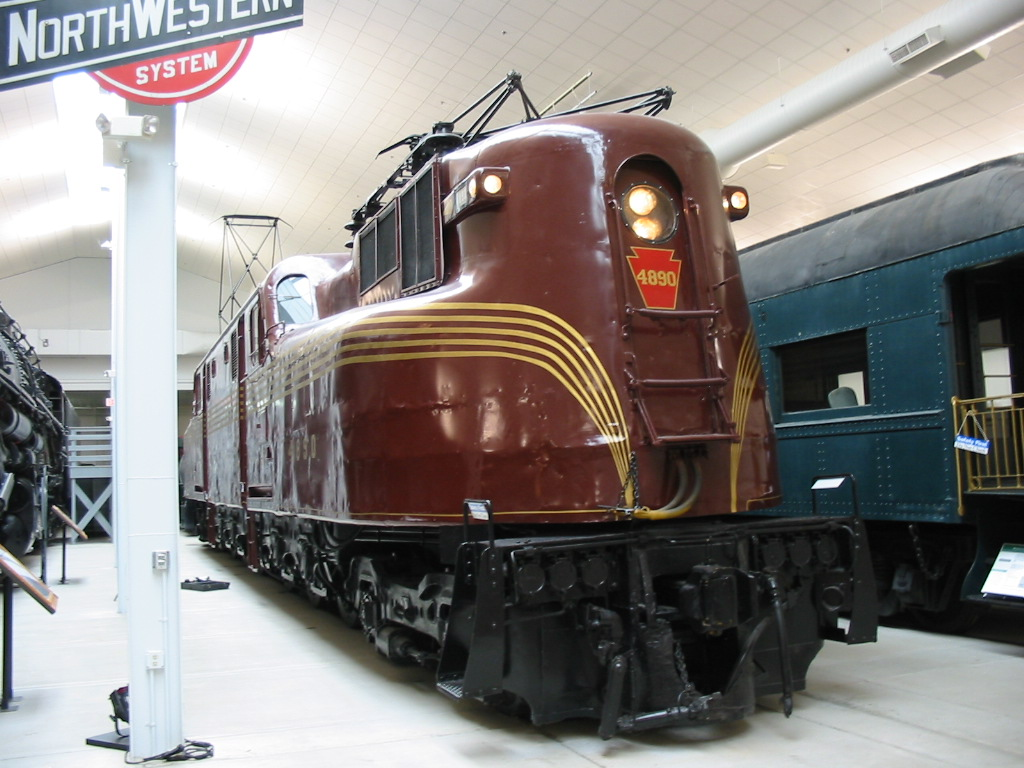
PRR GG1 #4890 at the National Railroad Museum in Green Bay, Wisconsin

When work on the Hudson River tunnels and New York's Penn Station was in progress, the type of electric locomotives to be used was an important consideration. At that time only a few electric locomotives existed. Several experimental locomotives were designed by railroad and Westinghouse engineers and tried on the West Jersey & Seashore Railroad track. From these tests the DD1 class was developed. The DD1s were used in pairs (back-to-back). Thirty-three of these engines having Westinghouse equipment were built at Altoona. They were capable of speeds up to 85 miles per hour (137 km/h). Placed in service in 1910, they performed well, lasting in regular service through the 1940s.

Steel suburban passenger cars capable of being electrified for MU operation were designed due to the need for such cars in service to Penn Station through its associated tunnels and were designated MP54. Designs for corresponding cars accommodating baggage and mail were produced also. Eight of these cars were electrified with DC equipment to provide shuttle service from Penn Station to Manhattan Transfer between 1910 and 1922. More extensive electrification plans required AC electrification, starting with 93 cars for the Paoli Line in 1915. With the expansion of the AC electrification, additional MP54 cars were electrified or purchased new until a total of 481 cars was reached in 1951. Replacement with newer types of cars began in 1958 and the last MP54 cars were retired in the early 1980s.

The single FF1 appeared in 1917 and ran experimentally for a number of years in preparation for electrification over the Allegheny Mountains that never came to fruition. Its AC induction motors and side-rod drive powered six axles. It developed a starting tractive force of 140,000 pounds (64,000 kg), which was capable of ripping couplers out of the fragile wooden freight cars in use at the time.

In 1924, another side-rod locomotive was designed: (the L5 class). Two DC locomotives were built for the New York electrified zone and a third, road number 3930, was AC-equipped and put in service at Philadelphia. Later 21 more L-5 locomotives were built for the New York service. A six-wheeled switching engine was the next electric motive power designed, being classified as B1. Of the first 16 AC engines, two were used at Philadelphia and 14 on the Bay Ridge line, while 12 DC-equipped engines were assigned to Sunnyside Yard in Queens, New York.

The O1 class was a light passenger type. Eight of these engines were built from June 1930 to December 1931. The P5 class was also introduced, with two of this class being placed in service during July and August 1931. Following these came the P5A, a slightly heavier design capable of traveling 80 miles per hour (130 km/h) and with a tractive force of 56,250 pounds (25,510 kg). In all, 89 of these locomotives were built. The first had a box cab design and were placed in service in 1932. The following year, the last 28 under construction were redesigned to have a streamlined type of cab. Some engines underwent re-gearing for freight service.

In 1933, two entirely new locomotives were being planned: the R1 and the GG-1 class. The R-1 had a rigid frame for its four driving axles, while the GG-1 had two frames which were articulated. Both of these prototypes, along with an O-1, a P5A and a K4s steam locomotive underwent exhaustive testing. Testing was conducted over a special section of test track near Claymont, Delaware, and lasted for nearly two years.

As a result of these experiments, the GG1 type was chosen and the construction of 57 locomotives was authorized. The first GG1 was finished in April and by August 1935 all 57 were completed. These first GG1 engines were designated for passenger service, while most of the P5A type were made available for freight service. Some of the later-built GG1s were assigned to freight service as well. The total number of GG1s built was 139. They are rated at 4,620 hp (3,450 kW) at speeds of 100 miles per hour (160 km/h).

On August 26, 1999, the U.S. Postal Service issued commemorative 33-cent All Aboard! 20th Century American Trains stamps. These commemorative stamps featured five celebrated American passenger trains from the 1930s and 1940s. One of the five stamps features an image of a GG-1 locomotive pulling the "Congressional Limited Express." The official Pennsylvania State Electric Locomotive is the GG-1 #4859. It received this designation on December 18, 1987, and is currently on display in Harrisburg, Pennsylvania.

==== Diesel ====
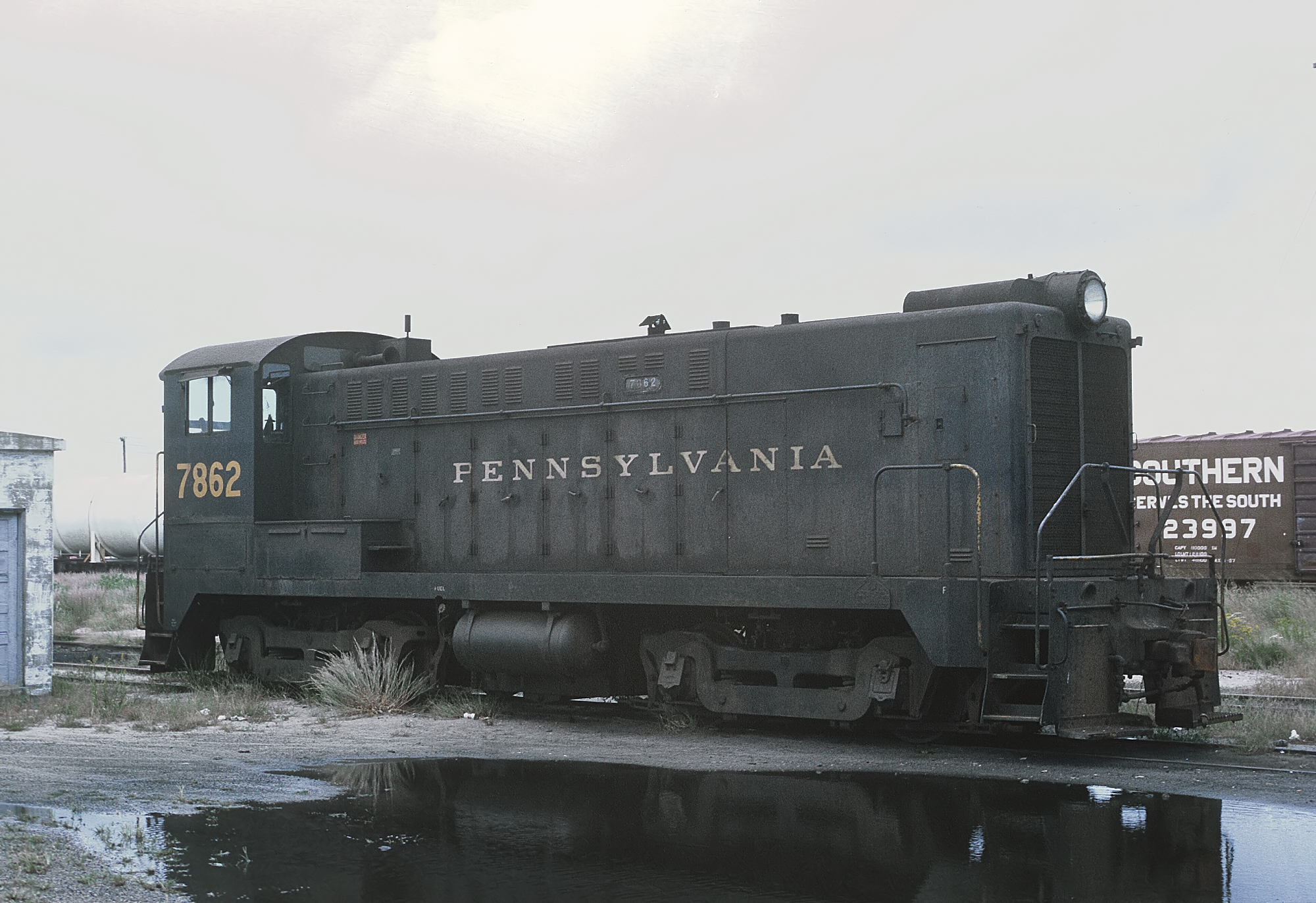
A PRR Baldwin DS-4-4-660 switcher at Little Creek, Virginia in 1969

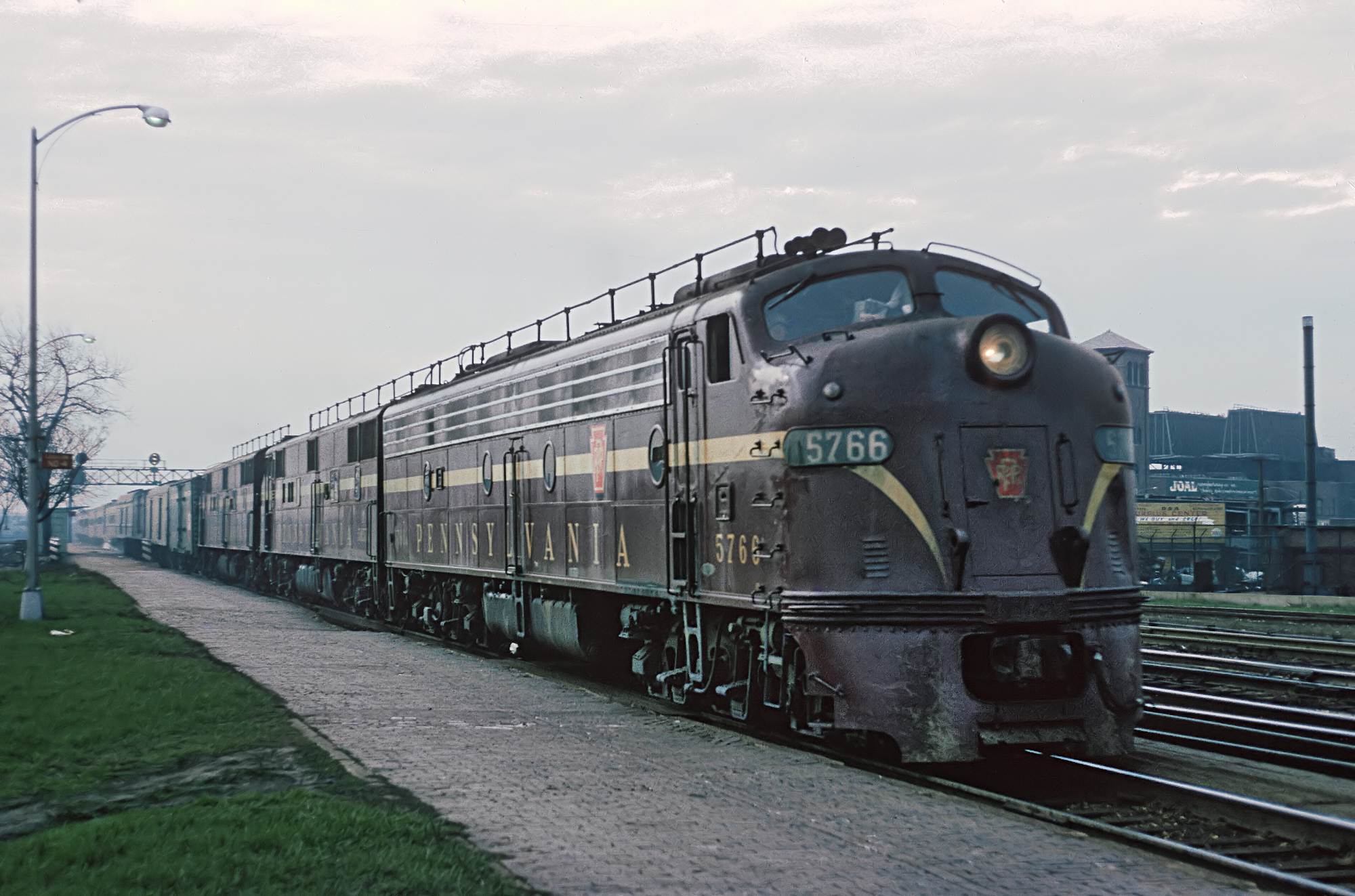
PRR EMD E8s with the Manhattan Limited at Englewood, Illinois in 1965

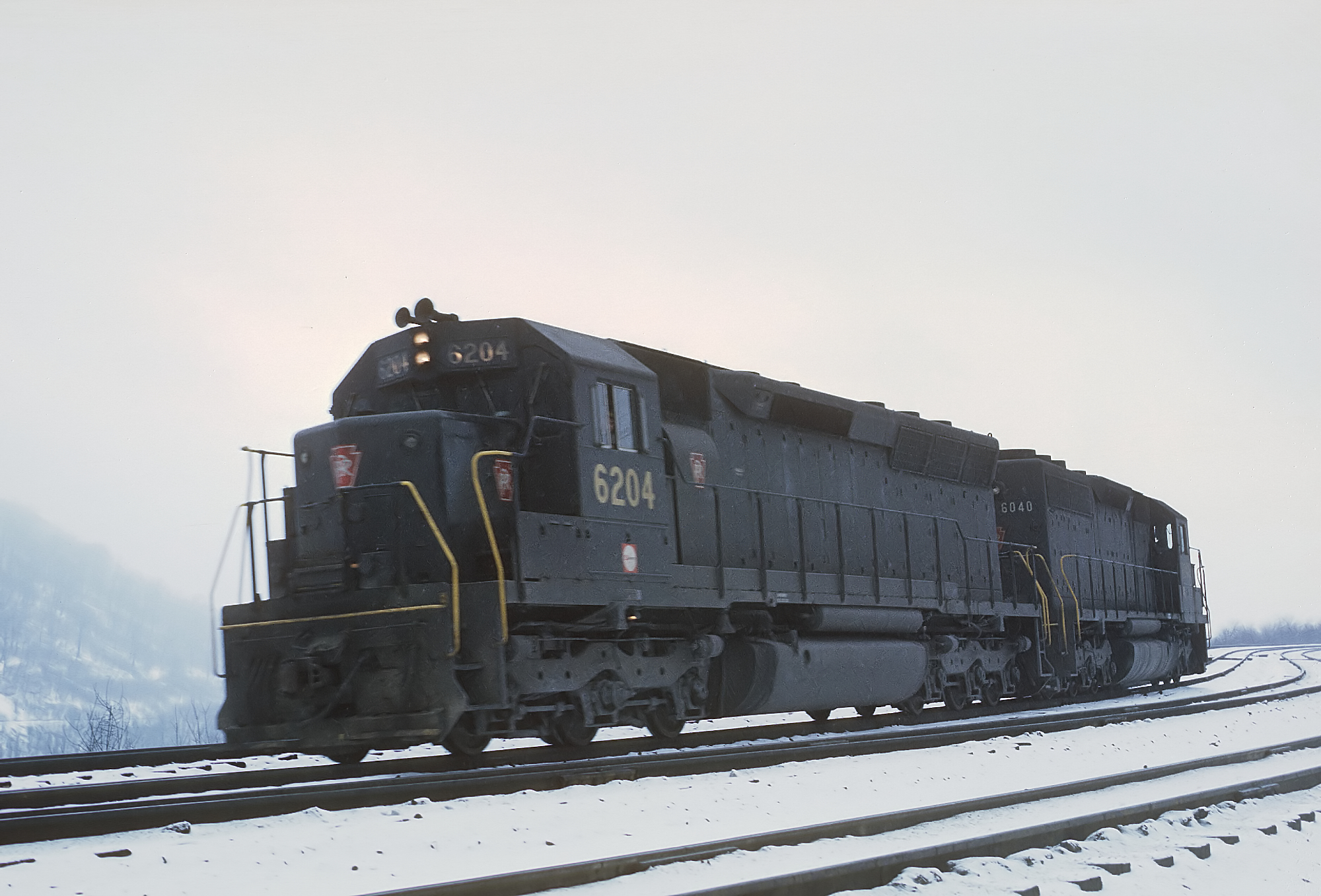
PC EMD SD45 and SD40 on Horseshoe Curve in February 1969

In June 1937, the Pennsy acquired its first diesel locomotive: a 600-hp diesel-electric switch engine from Electro-Motive Corporation (EMC), a predecessor of General Motors Electro-Motive Division (EMD). EMC called it an SW model; the railroad dubbed it class ES6.

The Pennsy bought its second diesel, another switcher, in October 1941: an EMD NW2 (Pennsy class ES10). Wartime restrictions soon restricted locomotive builders' production of diesels intended for freight service. Still, the Pennsy managed to add 15 Baldwin switchers and one EMD switcher.

After the war, the Pennsy began to buy diesel locomotives in earnest. From 1945 through 1947, the railroad bought roughly 100 switcher, freight, and passenger diesels from various builders, then another 800 or so (total) in 1948 and 1949.

=== Passenger units ===
For passenger units, the PRR purchased 60 E7-class locomotives from EMD, which the Pennsy dubbed the EP20 class. 46 of this number were designated "A" units, meaning that they had a cab for the train crew. The remaining 14 were "B" units, cabless booster units controlled by an "A" unit. The Pennsy also acquired 15 Alco PA1/PB1 units (class AP20) and 27 Baldwin DR-6-4-2000 (class BP20) units. The Baldwin units were originally for the passenger service fleet, but these locomotives proved troublesome, and some were reclassified as BF16z freight locomotives.

The Pennsy also bought 24 Baldwin DR-12-8-1500/2s, called "Centipedes" and classified by Pennsy as BP60. The Centipede had an immense weight of 593.71 short tons (538,600 kg) and a starting tractive effort of 205,000 pounds. Unreliable and expensive to maintain, they were quickly relegated to helper service.

From 1950 to 1952, the Pennsy bought 74 EMD E8A locomotives, the successor to the E7, and classified them EP22s. Also, the PRR purchased 40 dual-service EMD FP7 units which were similar to the E7/8 units but using 4 axles instead of 6.

=== Freight units ===
From the late 1940s through to the merger with the New York Central in 1968, the Pennsy purchased about 1,500 diesel freight units. (Note: Freight units as classified by the PRR.) 2/3 of these units were built by EMD, primarily F3s, F7s, GP9s, GP35s, SD40s, and SD45s. Early on in dieselization of freight units, the Pennsy purchased cab units from Alco, Baldwin, EMD, and Fairbanks Morse. Heading into the 1950s, the Pennsy continued to add more diesel units to their fleet. Still preferring EMD, the Pennsy did add FA units and BLH RF-16 "Sharks". In 1956, the Pennsy called for bids to supply a large order of diesel locomotives. GM/EMD gave the Pennsy an exceptional deal on new, reliable GP9s, and received the entire order. When this large diesel order arrived the following year, the Pennsy retired all of its remaining steam engines. One of the losing bidders, Baldwin Locomotive Works — a longtime supplier of Pennsy locomotives — had been counting on winning at least some of the work. When EMD won it all, the 126-year-old Baldwin declared bankruptcy.

For the last decade of Pennsy's existence (1960s), the Pennsy was ordering 4-axle power, buying Alco's 'Century' series locomotives, newcomer General Electric (GE) U25Bs, and EMD GP30s and GP35s. But by 1965, the Pennsy turned exclusively to 6-axle power, buying Alco's C628 and C630, GE's U25C, U28C, and U30C, and EMD's SD35, SD40, and SD45.

=== Signaling ===
The Pennsylvania Railroad was one of the first railroads to replace semaphore signals with position-light signals. Such signals, which featured a large round target with up to eight amber-colored lights in a circle and one in the center, could be lit in various patterns to convey different meanings, were more visible in fog, and remained effective even when one light in a row was inoperative.

Signal aspects, or meanings, were displayed as rows of three lit lights. The aspects corresponded with upper-quadrant semaphore signal positions: vertical for "proceed", a 45° angle rising to the right for "approach", horizontal for "stop", a 45° angle rising to the left for "restriction", a "X" shape for "take siding", and a full circle (used in electrified territory) for "lower pantograph". Additional aspects were conveyed with a second target head below the first, either a single light, a partial target, or a full target. Separate Manual Block signal aspects existed as well.

In later years, interlocking home signals north and west of Rockville (near Harrisburg) were modified so that the two outside lights in the horizontal "stop" row had red lenses; the center lamp would be extinguished when the signal displayed "stop". Such "red-eye" lenses were also temporarily installed at Overbrook Interlocking near Philadelphia.

Starting in the late 1920s, the Pennsy installed Pulse code cab signaling along certain tracks used by high-speed passenger trains. Information traveled through the rails using track circuits, was picked up by a sensor on the locomotive, and displayed in the engineer's cab. The Pennsy ultimately installed cab signals on its New York-Washington, Philadelphia-Pittsburgh, and Pittsburgh-Indianapolis lines (the latter which was later downgraded by PC and ultimately abandoned by Conrail). The Pennsylvania also experimented with cab signals without wayside signals, an approach later expanded by Conrail (Conemaugh line) and Norfolk Southern Railway (Cleveland line). Cab signals were subsequently adopted by several other U.S. railroads, especially on passenger lines. This technology, advanced for its time, is still used by Amtrak.

== Facilities ==
=== Shops ===
The back shops of the Pennsylvania Railroad were more ingrained in the culture of the corporation than in most other railroads, mainly due to the large output of highly distinctive locomotives produced by them over the course of decades. The earliest locomotive and car repair shops were established in the mid-1850s in West Philadelphia, Harrisburg, Altoona, and Pittsburgh. Those at Altoona, Pennsylvania (below) became the primary repair and erecting facilities for the system throughout its existence and employed up to 16,000 people. The second largest were located in Columbus, Ohio, commonly called the "20th Street Shops" and the "Panhandle Shops," employing up to 8,000 in the 1920s. The shops at Fort Wayne, Indiana were also a major repair facility, first established by the Pittsburgh, Fort Wayne and Chicago Railway. The yards and shops in Wilmington, Delaware were built to serve the southern section of the system, employing up to 2,500 in the 1920s. The car shop at Hollidaysburg, Pennsylvania was the largest in the world, measuring 2,760 by 330 feet. Additional repair facilities were located in Dennison, Ohio; Renovo, Pennsylvania; Pitcairn, Pennsylvania, and Mifflin, Pennsylvania.

==== Altoona Works ====
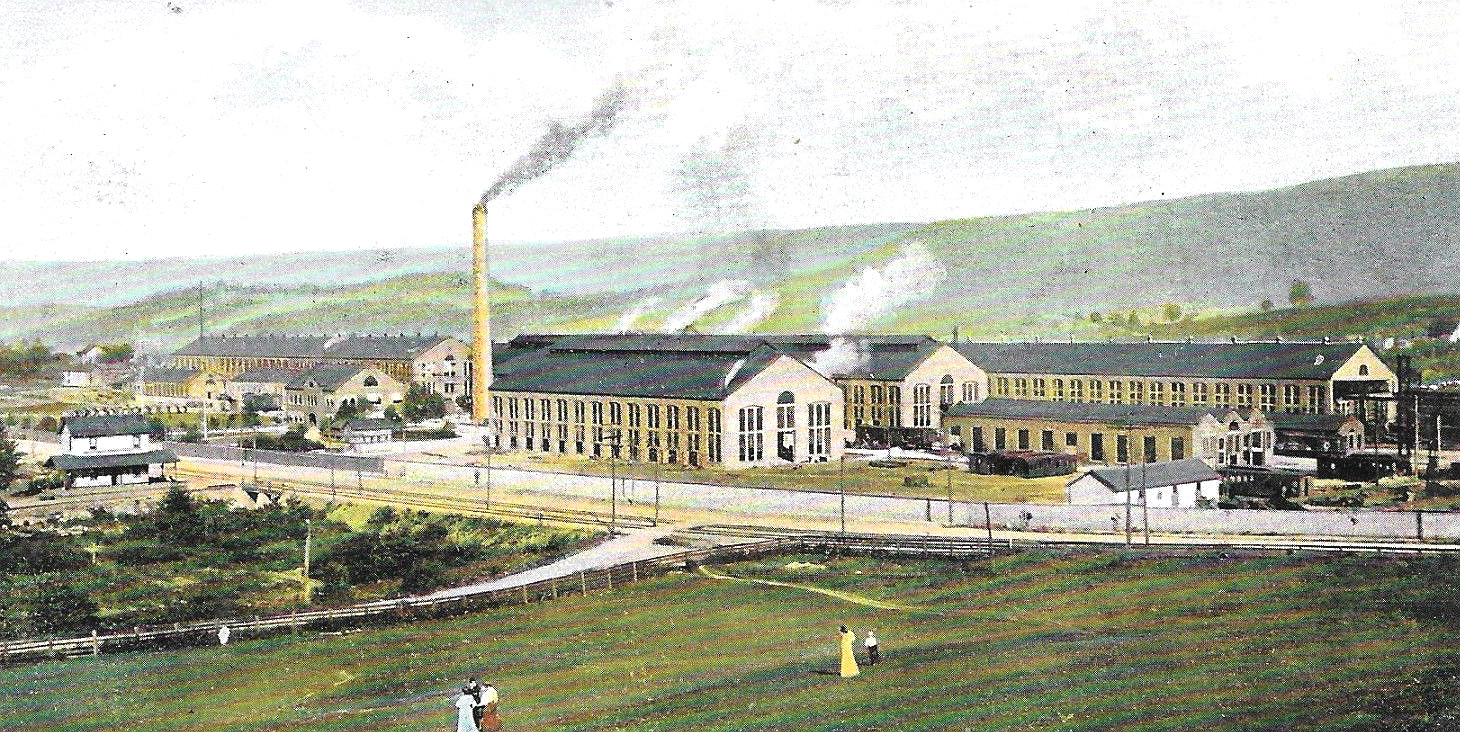
A tinted postcard of Juniata Shops in Altoona

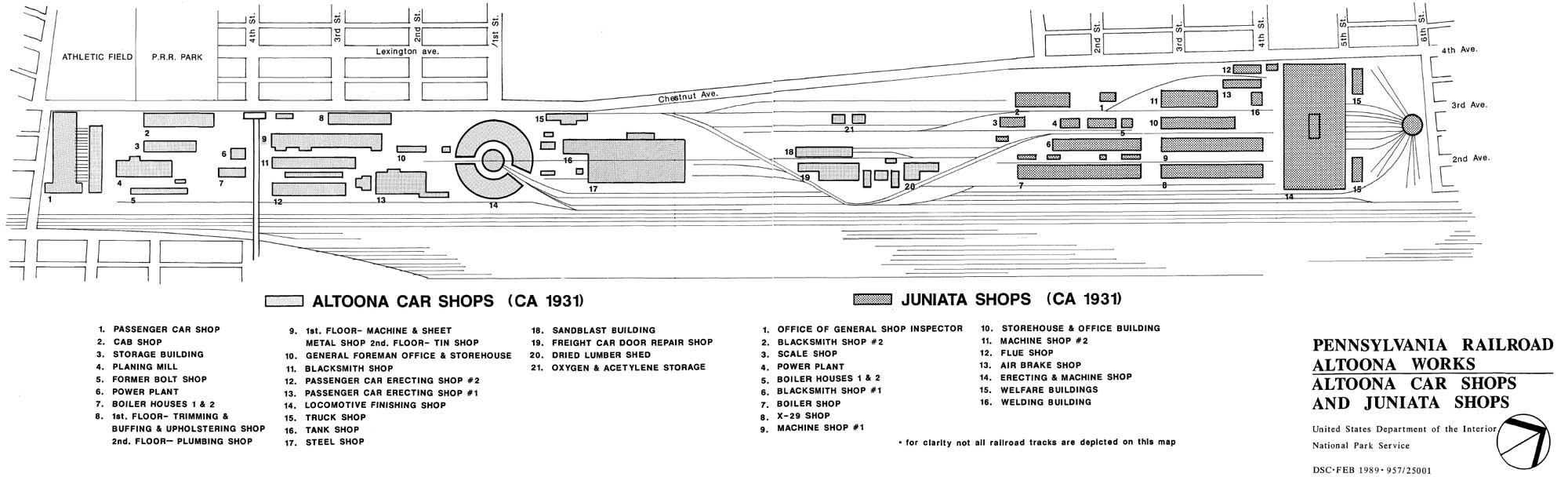
Map of the Altoona Works, c. 1931

In 1849, Pennsy officials developed plans to construct a repair facility at Altoona. Construction started in 1850, and soon, several small buildings housed a machine shop, woodworking shop, blacksmith shop, locomotive repair shop, and foundry. These facilities were later demolished to make room for continuing expansion.

By 1926, the Altoona Works occupied 217.82 acres (88.15 ha) and consisted of four units: the Altoona Machine Shops, Altoona Car Shops, Juniata Shops, and South Altoona Foundries.

- The Altoona Machine Shops consisted of over a dozen buildings and performed locomotive repairs, plus made locomotive repair parts and non-metal castings.
- The Altoona Car Shops were built beginning in 1869. By 1926, it included a dozen buildings, built passenger and freight cars, and repaired same.
- The Juniata Shops were built out of need for more shop space at Altoona, in 1889. These shops consisted of 10 buildings, and constructed locomotives and performed heavy repairs of locomotives.
- The South Altoona Foundries were built, again, out of need for more space at Altoona, in 1904. The shops primarily made gray iron castings.

In 1875, the Altoona Works started a Test Department for Pennsy equipment, both built and purchased. In following years, the Pennsylvania Railroad led the nation in the development of research and testing procedures of practical value for the railroad industry. Use of the testing facilities was discontinued in 1968.

By 1945, the Altoona Works had become one of the largest repair and construction facilities for locomotives and cars in the world. Since 1968, many of the structures of Altoona Works were demolished.

=== Yards ===
The Pennsylvania Railroad had several railroad yards (rail yards) throughout its system.

- Conway Yard was built in the 1880s, 22 miles (35 km) northwest of Pittsburgh in Conway, Pennsylvania. Conway was built strategically in the middle of the Pennsylvania's system and started as a poling yard. The yard was made into a hump yard in 1901 to increase the volume of cars handled. By 1957, it was the world's largest automatic classification yard.
- Crestline Yard was built by the Pittsburgh, Fort Wayne & Chicago Railway around 1863 and significantly improved in the early 1920s by the Pennsy to speed Chicago shipments and eliminate east and westbound freight classification at Fort Wayne. Crestline is located about halfway between Pittsburgh and Chicago in Crestline, Ohio, and could hold over 1,600 cars.
- Enola Yard was built in the early 1900s and lies across the Susquehanna River from Harrisburg. The yard grew from humble beginnings of 12 tracks to over 140 miles (230 km) of tracks, capable of handling thousands of freight cars and becoming the world's largest freight rail yard by the 1940s.
- Sunnyside Yard was completed in 1910 for use with Penn Station in New York City. The yard is across the East River from Penn Station in Manhattan, situated in Sunnyside, Long Island. Sunnyside yard was capable of storing over 1,000 passenger cars, occupying a roughly rectangular area 8,815 feet (2,687 m) long by 1,625 feet (495 m) wide; 192 acres (78 ha) in all.

=== Major passenger stations ===
The Pennsy built several grand passenger stations, alone or with other railroads. These architectural marvels, whose city name was usually preceded by "Penn Station", were the hubs for the PRR's passenger service. Many are still in use today, served by Amtrak and regional passenger carriers.

Major Passenger Stations of the Pennsylvania Railroad
Location	Station Name	Photo	Description
Baltimore	Penn Station	Photo of Penn Station, Baltimore, Maryland	Main article: Pennsylvania Station (Baltimore) The main station of Baltimore, this Beaux-Arts building was built in 1911 from a design by architect Kenneth MacKenzie Murchison. It is currently served by Amtrak and MARC commuter service. Both approaches to the station are via tunnels, the B&P Tunnel to the south and the Union Tunnel to the north.
Chicago	Chicago Union Station	Photo of Union Station, Chicago, Illinois	Main article: Chicago Union Station The PRR, along with the Milwaukee Road and the Burlington Route, built Chicago Union Station, the only one of Chicago's old stations still used as an intercity train station. It was designed by Graham, Anderson, Probst & White in the Beaux-Arts style and opened in 1925. Today, Union Station serves as the Midwestern hub for Amtrak and a terminal for six Metra commuter lines.
New York City	New York Penn Station	Photo of Penn Station, New York City	Main articles: Pennsylvania Station (New York City) and Pennsylvania Station (1910–1963) The original Pennsylvania Station was designed by the noted architectural firm of McKim, Mead and White and was modeled on the Roman Baths of Caracalla; it was notable for its high vaulted ceilings. The station opened in 1910 to provide access to Manhattan from New Jersey without having to use a ferry, making the Pennsy the only railroad to enter New York City from the south. The station was served by the Pennsy's own trains as well as those of its subsidiary, the Long Island Rail Road. The station's headhouse was demolished for redevelopment in 1963. However, most of the station's rail infrastructure (platforms, tracks, concourses, waiting room) and staircases were below street level, and survived as the current Pennsylvania Station. The station continues as an underground operation (serving Amtrak, New Jersey Transit and the LIRR) and is the busiest intercity railroad station in the United States.
Newark, New Jersey	Penn Station	Photo of Penn Station, Newark, New Jersey	Main article: Pennsylvania Station (Newark) Newark's Pennsylvania Station was designed by McKim, Mead and White. It opened in 1935, was completed in 1937 and was refurbished in 2007. Its style is a mixture of Art Deco and Neo-Classical. All Amtrak trains stop here, and the station serves three commuter lines, PATH rapid transit to Jersey City and Manhattan, and the Newark Light Rail.
Philadelphia, PA	Broad Street Station	Photo of Broad Street Station, Philadelphia, Pennsylvania	Main article: Broad Street Station (Philadelphia) Broad Street Station was the first of the great passenger stations built by the Pennsy. Opened in 1881 at a cost of $4,272,268.53 ($143 million in 2025), the station was expanded in the early 1890s by famed Philadelphia architect Frank Furness. For most of its existence it was, with City Hall, one of the crown jewels of Philadelphia's architecture, and until a 1923 fire, had the largest train shed in the world (a 91 m span). It was the terminal for the Pennsylvania in Philadelphia, bringing trains into the center of the city at Broad and Filbert streets. The station was demolished in 1953 after the Pennsy moved passenger service to 30th Street Station.
Philadelphia	30th Street Station	Photo of 30th Street Station, Philadelphia, Pennsylvania	Main article: 30th Street Station 30th Street Station displays its majestic—and traditional—architectural style with its enormous waiting room and its vestibules. The station, in spite of its architectural classicism, opened in 1933, when modern and Art Deco styles were more popular. Its construction was needed to accommodate increased intercity and suburban traffic. It replaced the 32nd Street Station (West Philadelphia). It is now the primary rail station in Philadelphia, serving long-distance and commuter trains.
Pittsburgh	Union Station	Photo of Penn Station, Pittsburgh, Pennsylvania	Main article: Union Station (Pittsburgh) The original station was built in 1865 and was destroyed by fire in 1877 during the Pittsburgh Riots. A temporary station was quickly built but, remained in service until the early 1900s, when the present station was built between 1898 and 1903, renovated in 1954, and partially repurposed in 1988. The station was originally called Union Station, and served as the terminal for the Allegheny Valley, PFtW&C, and the Pennsylvania Railroad.
Washington, D.C.	Washington Union Station	Photo of Union Station, Washington, D.C.	Main article: Washington Union Station Union Station, built jointly with the B&O, served as a hub for Pennsy passenger services in the nation's capital, with connections to the B&O, and Southern Railway. The station was designed by architect Daniel Burnham and opened in 1908. The Richmond, Fredericksburg & Potomac Railroad provided a link to Richmond, Virginia, about 100 miles (160 km) to the south, where major north–south lines of the Atlantic Coast Line and Seaboard Air Line railroads provided service to North and South Carolina, Georgia, and Florida. Washington Union Station is the location of Amtrak's headquarters and serves Amtrak and regional commuter railroads, including MARC and VRE.

== Heritage units ==
As a part of Norfolk Southern's 30th anniversary, they painted 20 new locomotives into predecessor schemes. NS #8102, a GE ES44AC, was painted into the Pennsylvania RR scheme.

As a part of New Jersey Transit's 40th anniversary in 2019, three locomotives were painted into predecessor schemes. Bombardier ALP-46A #4636 was wrapped into the Pennsylvania RR scheme.

== See also ==
- Conrail — successor to Penn Central from 1976
- Horseshoe Curve (Altoona, Pennsylvania)
- List of Pennsylvania Railroad lines east of Pittsburgh
- List of Pennsylvania Railroad lines west of Pittsburgh
- List of Pennsylvania Railroad passenger trains
- List of Pennsylvania Railroad predecessor railroads
- Monopoly — One of the railroads in the Atlantic City-themed version of the game is the PRR.
- New York Central Railroad — longtime adversary, eventual merger partner
- New York, New Haven and Hartford Railroad — longtime partner in run-through trains, also became part of Penn Central
- Norfolk Southern Railway — successor to Conrail in former PRR territory
- Penn Central Transportation Company — successor to the PRR and NYC in 1968
- Pennsylvania Company — holding company incorporated in 1870 to own/operate lines west of Pittsburgh
- Pennsylvania Lines LLC — Conrail subsidiary that owned ex-PRR trackage and PRR reporting mark
- Pennsylvania Station — the name for several major stations
- Pennsylvania Railroad Freight Building
- Pennsylvania Railroad Office Building
- PRR locomotive classification
- Unification to standard gauge on May 31 – June 1, 1886
- Kadono Jūkurō
