= Gallitzin Tunnels =

Railway tunnel in Gallitzin, Pennsylvania

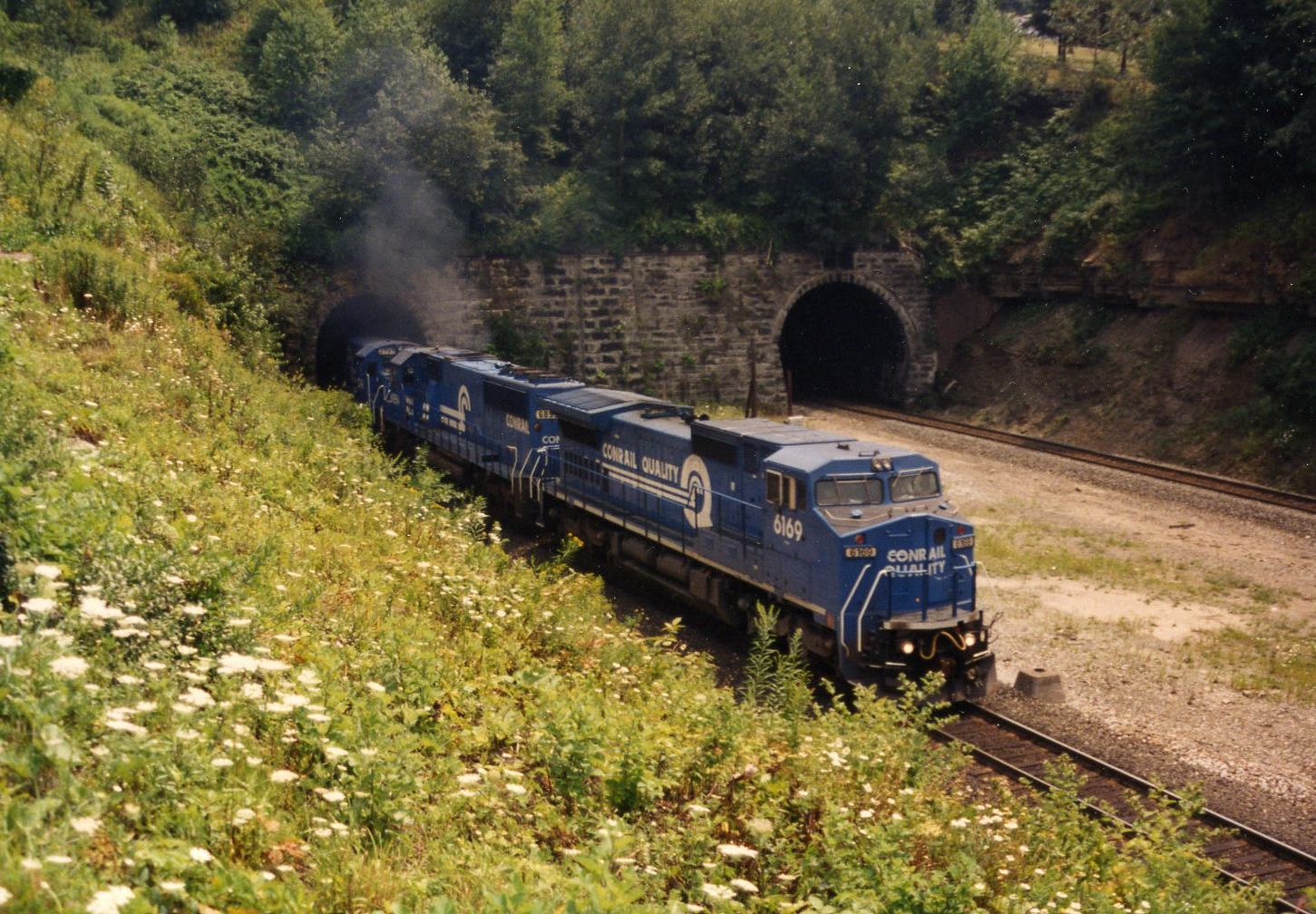
- A Conrail locomotive leads a westbound train through the west portal of the Gallitzin Tunnel in 1993. At right, the west portal of the Allegheny Tunnel.
- Interactive map of Gallitzin Tunnels

Overview
- Location: Gallitzin, Pennsylvania
- Coordinates: 40°28′53″N 78°33′01″W
- Status: Gallitzin Tunnel out of service 1995; Allegheny Tunnel (two tracks) and New Portage Tunnel (one track) in service

Operation
- Opened: Gallitzin Tunnel 1904, Allegheny Tunnel 1854, New Portage Tunnel 1855
- Closed: Gallitzin Tunnel 1995, New Portage Tunnel 1857-1890
- Owner: Norfolk Southern Railway
- Operator: Norfolk Southern Railway

Technical
- Track length: Gallitzin Tunnel 3,612 feet, Allegheny Tunnel 3,612 feet, New Portage Tunnel 1,620 feet
- No. of tracks: Gallitzin Tunnel 0 (1 track 1904-1995), Allegheny Tunnel 2 (1 track 1904-1995), New Portage Tunnel 1 (2 tracks 1898-1971)
- Track gauge: 4 feet, 8 and one-half inches (56.5 inches)
- Max elevation: Gallitzin and Allegheny Tunnels 2,167 feet (at west tunnel portals), New Portage Tunnel 2,198 feet (at AR tower west of west tunnel portal)

The Gallitzin Tunnels in Gallitzin, Pennsylvania, are a set of three adjacent tunnels through the Allegheny Mountains in western Pennsylvania. They were completed in 1854, 1855, and 1902 by the Pennsylvania Railroad as part of the cross-state route that includes the nearby Horseshoe Curve to the east. Their ownership has since passed to Penn Central Transportation Company, then to Conrail, and most recently to the Norfolk Southern Railway. The tunnels are currently used by Norfolk Southern freight trains and Amtrak Pennsylvanian passenger trains. The namesake Gallitzin Tunnel is out of service.

== History ==
=== Construction ===
The first tunnel, which is the middle of the three bores through the mountain, was built by the Pennsylvania Railroad from 1851 to 1854. Originally named Summit Tunnel, it is 1,100 metres (3,600 ft) long at an elevation of 660 metres (2,170 ft) above mean sea level and is known today as the Allegheny Tunnel.

The second tunnel, the southernmost of the bores, was constructed by the Commonwealth of Pennsylvania from 1852 to 1855 as part of the New Portage Railroad (NPRR). In 1857, the Pennsylvania Railroad bought the New Portage Railroad from the Commonwealth, and appropriated the "Allegheny" name for its "Summit" tunnel. The PRR took the New Portage Tunnel out of service shortly thereafter. In the 1890s, it was expanded to two tracks and used as the primary route for eastbound traffic.

The third tunnel, the Gallitzin Tunnel, was begun in 1902 and opened in 1904 immediately to the north of the Allegheny Tunnel.

=== Later history ===
In the early 1990s, Conrail (with money from the Commonwealth of Pennsylvania) enlarged the Allegheny and New Portage Tunnels to accommodate double-stack container on flatcar (COFC) trains. Work was done on the tunnels sequentially, starting with the Portage Tunnel followed by the Allegheny Tunnel. The Portage Tunnel was opened for eastbound traffic in 1993. The Allegheny Tunnel was enlarged from its original 1854 cross-section to contain two tracks that could be used for double-stack rail transport in either direction. The work was completed in September 1995, and the Gallitzin Tunnel (which was not enlarged) was taken out of service.

Amtrak's Pennsylvanian trains travel through the tunnel.

== Gallitzin Tunnels Park & Museum ==
Near the closed tunnel sits the Gallitzin Tunnels Park & Museum, which has a restored 1942 Pennsylvania caboose whose interior is visible to visitors. The museum, which sits across the street, has exhibits about the area's railroad, industrial, social, and religious heritage; a gift shop, and a theater. The museum building also houses borough offices, a police station, a library, and an archival room.

== See also ==
- List of tunnels documented by the Historic American Engineering Record in Pennsylvania
