= Main Line of Public Works =

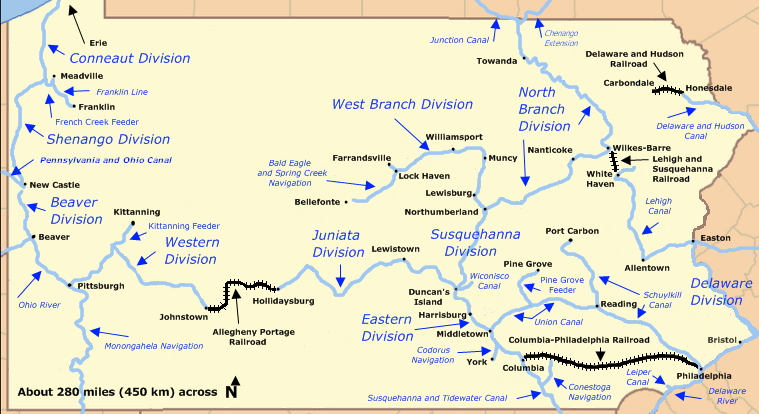
- Map of historic Pennsylvania canals and connecting railroads
- Interactive map of Main Line of Public Works

Specifications
- Locks: 168 (The Eastern Division Canal had 14 locks, the Juniata Division 86, and the Western Division 68)
- Maximum height AMSL: 2,322 ft (708 m) (Summit of the Allegheny Portage Railroad through Blair Gap)
- Status: Canals abandoned except for historic and recreational segments. Many railroad segments survive as part of the Keystone Corridor.

History
- Original owner: Commonwealth of Pennsylvania
- Date of act: 1826
- Construction began: 1828
- Date completed: 1834
- Date closed: Sold to Pennsylvania Railroad in 1857 with the last canal segment near Harrisburg closing in 1901

Geography
- Start point: Philadelphia
- End point: Pittsburgh
- Branches: Wiconisco Canal, Kittanning Feeder, Allegheny Outlet
- Branch of: Pennsylvania Canal
- Connects to: Delaware River, Schuylkill Canal, Conestoga Navigation, Susquehanna and Tidewater Canal, Codorus Navigation, Union Canal, Susquehanna Division, Allegheny River, Monongahela River, Ohio River, Ashley Planes, Lehigh and Susquehanna Railroad, Lehigh Canal, and Delaware Canal

The Main Line of Public Works was a package of legislation passed by the Commonwealth of Pennsylvania in 1826 (Note: The legislation was amended several times, usually to substitute some other means or project as a result of some engineering difficulty or obstacle that was unforeseen and difficult to accomplish notably in 1828, and 1834 which redefined goals and reset funding while authorizing right-of-ways and charters, etcetera.) to establish a means of transporting freight (Note: In 1824–1826, the 'best means' of moving both people and cargo meant water transport, usually by using mule towed barges compatible with the waterway. Such technologies and systems had been in service for many centuries in the canals in Europe (old proven technologies) connecting rivers and ports, bypassing marshlands, or even crossing peninsular barriers. * Towpath canals were also by far, the fastest way to travel, the commercial drivers, drovers, and infrastructure giving otherwise unobtainable average speeds over long distances, barring competing sea transport with favorable winds—and the endurance to ride for a long, long work day on a given vehicle. If duration or illness became an issue, many locks sprouted pubs, stores, and inns catering to the travelers and boatmen and the canals were the first travel companies to offer passenger services on regular schedules, and usually provided options to jump off with allowances to later continue the journey on a later regularly scheduled barge or boat.) between Philadelphia and Pittsburgh. It funded the construction of various long-proposed canal and road projects, mostly in southern Pennsylvania, that became a canal system and later added railroads. Built between 1826 and 1834, it established the Pennsylvania Canal System and the Allegheny Portage Railroad.

Later amendments substituted a new technology, railroads, in place of the planned but costly 82-mile (132 km) canal connecting the Delaware River in Philadelphia to the Susquehanna River. (Note: The canal connecting the Susquehanna to Philadelphia was envisioned south of the Schuylkill Canal (a navigation) transiting through a water gap and through Reading, which barely had enough water, given much of what was available had to be split to the Union Canal, to be reliable during summer and autumn. The poor water supply for the Schuylkill Navigation was one reason Josiah White dropped his interest in the project and explored taking over the lackluster Lehigh Coal Mine Company and proposed the navigation improving the navigability of the Lehigh River. The legislature granted him permission to bankrupt himself on the Lehigh (which had seen its share of mostly publicly funded improvement attempts as well)) The route from Philadelphia to Pittsburgh remained a patchwork of canals and railroads until the Pennsylvania Railroad was built in the 1850s.

== Historic Background ==
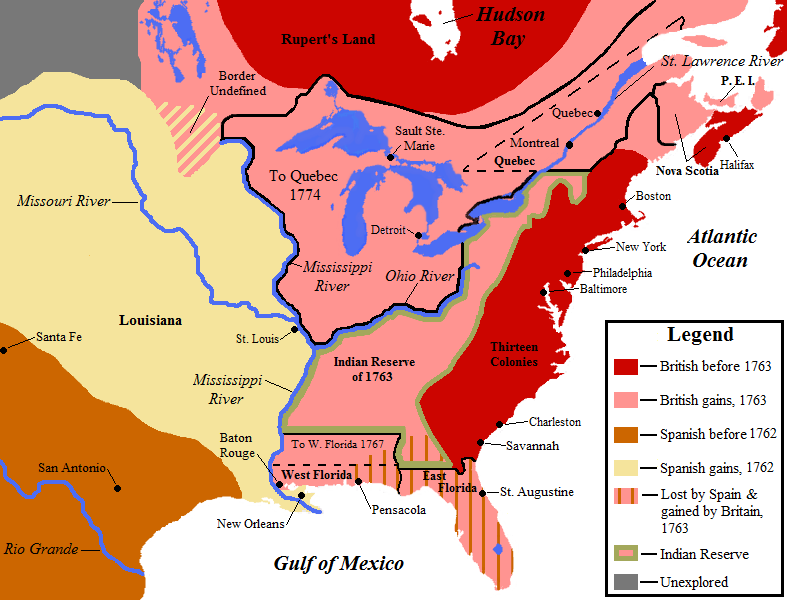
As a side agreement in support of their allied Indians, the British Colonial authorities closed the region west of the Appalachians and the gaps of the Allegheny to further migrations, even resorting to having military patrols forcibly removing colonists from their homesteads. The policy was very unpopular among American colonists, and grew more so as time went by.

Trans-Appalachian settlement had begun in earnest during the latter years of the French and Indian War (1754-1763). Following the war, the British government made several agreements, primarily with the Iroquois, which resulted in official policies to curb the expansion of settlement in the colonial West (today's Midwest). This was one of many British policies that created support for the American Revolution along the American frontier for those hoping to emigrate into the Ohio Country, and also for East Coast seaboard populations that were blooming in the pre-industrialization period.

After the 1779 Sullivan Expedition broke the power of the Five Civilized Nations of the Iroquois towards the end of the American Revolutionary War, settlement became viable from the lower Susquehanna Valley to Upstate New York as far as Lake Erie. The U.S. was able to claim trans-Appalachian territories from the Ohio River to the lower Great Lakes, and west to Minnesota and Wisconsin.

As the Revolutionary War wound down in the 1780s, many family groups moved west, establishing scattered settlements from below the Wyoming Valley across the near west into the retreating western frontiers and the lands of the old Ohio Country. In the early 1800s, the new farms established along the moving frontier west of the Appalachian mountains were being connected back to Atlantic seaboard cities by turnpikes, canals, and other transportation infrastructure works funded mostly by private funds or local governments. By the 1810s the population west of the mountains was exploding. Regional transport hubs were established in Brownsville, Pittsburgh, Cincinnati, Buffalo, Detroit, and New Orleans (and later in the 1840s St. Louis, Chicago, and St. Joseph, Missouri would develop similarly). The markets of this burgeoning population were targeted by the business class of Philadelphia and New Jersey.

The War of 1812 exacerbated a difficult energy crisis. Bituminous coal imports from Liverpool, England ground to a halt under an 1812 embargo, cutting off a major industrial fuel source for most American factories at that time. Simultaneously, residential heating fuel in the Philadelphia region was already becoming scarce and more expensive due to over-logging of the local forests on the eastern seaboard. These mounting fuel shortages would motivate Pennsylvanian lawmakers, industrialists, and residents to better exploit local coal resources in the decades during and following the war.

== Previous interior transportation projects ==
On March 31, 1790 the Pennsylvania General Assembly passed a resolution that authorized several river surveys, following petitions from the Society for Promoting the Improvement of Roads and Inland Navigation. These surveys confirmed that several rivers within Pennsylvania were suitable for improvement into navigations (Note: man-made watercourses similar to canals). In 1791 following the results of the surveys, an appropriation was made by the state of Pennsylvania to improve the Lehigh River. With the expectation of a soon-to-be-navigable Lehigh River, the Lehigh Coal Mine Company was founded in 1793 and subsequently purchased 10 thousand acres (4,000 ha) of land in the Mauch Chunk region of the Pennsylvania Coal Region. They created a 9 miles (14 km) road from their Mauch Chunk mining operation to the bank of the Lehigh River. However, the state of Pennsylvania did not use public funds to improve Lehigh River, and the Lehigh Coal Mine Company was not successful in shipping its coal down the rough and unimproved Lehigh.

At the outbreak of the War of 1812 the foundries of Philadelphia suddenly lacked the inexpensive bituminous coal previously imported from England. Philadelphia industrialists were pressed for some solution to their foundries' fuel needs. During the war, an employee of Pennsylvania industrialist (Note: Wire mill and nail factory owner, Josiah White built the first suspension bridge across the Schuylkill, for his factories were located near the Falls of the Schuylkill, systematically worked out several ways to effectively use Anthracite coal as a clean fuel, then spent a lifetime building infrastructure to deliver anthracite to the energy consumer, most of which he had to invent, design, develop, and refine along the way.) Josiah White had devised a method of burning "Rock Coal" properly in an effort to better exploit the relatively untapped coal resources within the local Pennsylvanian interior. White began buying shipments of local anthracite where he could, including two shipments from the Lehigh Coal Mine Company which had survived the trip down the Lehigh River. Pressure by various groups would encourage the Philadelphia Legislation to incorporate the Schuylkill Navigation Company on March 8, 1815. The Schuylkill Navigation Company was chartered to improve the Schuylkill River into the Schuylkill Navigation (Note: A series of locks, canals, dams, and other waterworks both within and adjacent to the Schuylkill River, all designed to turn the natural river into a reliable transportation and shipping route.)in 1815. The aim was to reliably connect the Coal Region (especially the Panther Creek Valley) in the Pennsylvanian interior to major cities on the coast, the industrial works near them, and their ports (for interstate coal export). White was one of the incorporators of the Schuylkill Navigation Company, however he would distance himself from the project when the project's backers took to quarreling over the best way to proceed. Ultimately the Schuylkill Navigation project was underfunded and work progressed slowly. Other major coal-carrying canals were completed first, including the Lehigh Canal in late 1820 and the Erie Canal in 1821 in New York. By mid-decade canal projects and some railroads were being proposed, organized, chartered, and built in Pennsylvania and other northeast seaboard states.

Josiah White turned instead to an alternative route down the Lehigh and Delaware rivers, believing that Lehigh coal was high quality and that the Lehigh Coal Mine Company could be secured cheaply, despite the more difficult waterways of the Lehigh. White and his business partners approached the failing LCMC, and after discussion "obtained the lease of their properties for a period of twenty years at an annual rental of one ear of corn". White and partners then approached the Philadelphia Legislature and successfully incorporated the Lehigh Navigation Company in March 1818, giving the company the rights to construct the Lehigh Canal (Note: The Legislature remarked that they "gave these gentlemen the opportunity of ruining themselves, as many members of the Legislature predicted would be the result of their undertaking."). The Lehigh Navigation Company would go on to construct the initial leg of the planned route, which would later be known as the Lower Lehigh Canal, from 1818 to late 1820 using private funding.

In 1823, White proposed creating a navigational canal that would allow deep keeled coastal ships to reach docks and pickup and transship coal down the Lehigh Canal (which White had full ownership of by 1818) to Easton, Pennsylvania. White then sought a source of coal, finding the mines of the failing and unreliable Lehigh Coal Mine Company in 1815 (Note: This mine would eventually deliver more coal through the Lehigh Canal than all of the coal they had previously delivered to market since their founding in 1792.). White surveyed the Lehigh river, decided the improvement project was feasible, and returned to lease the operations of the Lehigh Coal Mine Company and improve navigability on the Lehigh River. The first 60 miles of canal route White proposed followed the Delaware River from Easton to the Philadelphia suburb town of Bristol, and would later become the Delaware Canal. White did not have control over the Delaware River portion of the project, which was initially constructed by the State of Pennsylvania.

By 1818, White had obtained the legal permissions "to ruin himself" fixing up the Lehigh, founding the Lehigh Navigation Company (Note: Josiah White and his partner Erskine Hazard seeking funding, found some investors had an opinion that the coal mine had failed long enough under too many managers to have a chance, but the Navigations would work. Others, thought the coal mine was no challenge, but they'd be crazy to back the Navigations, which had seen numerous bills passed to allow navigational improvements back into the 1770s. In the end, they formed two companies with minority investors, the Lehigh Coal Company and the Lehigh Navigation Company.) and using a quasi-lock of his own design (Note: White's 'Bear Trap Lock' was patented, and like a trick of the days loggers, designed to block current flow while a wall of water was built up behind an obstruction (lock wing dam) then flip out of the way creating a freshet, a fast moving flood that allowed arks to float above the rocks on the rapids below on the flood waters. -- Peter Fritts, 1877) to construct what is now known as the Lower Lehigh Canal between 1818 and 1820. The works had made sufficient improvements by late 1820 to deliver 365 tons of anthracite coal to Easton (Note: White and Hazard had circulated a prospectus with a goal for the Lehigh Navigation Company to regularly deliver ten tons of coal per month by 1824. They'd had to scramble in 1820 to find enough surprised and delighted buyers for no one was expecting anthracite in such quantities, and there was still a reluctance and lack of knowledge on how it could be burned.) — by 1825 the annual anthracite tonnage had climbed to over 28,000 short tons (25,000 t) per annum. White's ventures firmly established anthracite as a reliable inexpensive fuel and proved that once-treacherous inland Pennsylvania waterways could be engineered into profitable industrial shipping routes.

A couple years later, the legislature declined another offer by the Lehigh Coal and Navigation Company (LC&N) which had built the Lehigh Canal with private funds. LC&N was unquestionably one of the most innovative companies of the era, driving the mining, transportation and industrial development of Pennsylvania by example, implementation, and by funding quite a few projects, as well. This new proposal was to build—at the companies expense— the project that would (in concept) become their version of the eventual Delaware Canal (alternatively the 'Delaware Division of the Pennsylvania Canal') built by the states engineering managers a few years later. The route was nearly the same, but the Delaware Canal as the state built it had numerous engineering flaws, including locks both too short and unpaired (single & supporting only one way traffic) locks LC&N's experience and expertise would have mitigated. LC&N had started coal flowing to Philadelphia using short squared-off blocky barges it called coal arks, but in 1822-23 was already re-doing the upper four locks on the Lehigh Canal to support a steam powered tug pulling boats over 120 feet (37 m) built to support two way traffic with full locks. By 1825 the volume of coal coming down the Lehigh & Delaware to Philadelphia was becoming huge and problematic — LC&N was rapidly over logging the forests feeding the Lehigh to build boats for the one way trip. The extra expenses of the lack of a tow path canal for the sixty miles Easton-Philadelphia was very costly to LC&N, and the state's Delaware Canal attempt when opened in 1832 was five years later than promised and didn't work; the State had to hire Josiah White to repair its major deficiencies, then needed LC&N's expertise to operate it. LC&N ended up running both canals into the 1930s, and retained the rights to the Lehigh until the 1960s. While some problems were fixable, the Delaware Canal's lock's design was always a costly economic problem until the Canal became the parkland and current haven for pleasure boats.

White and Hazard made the offer in return for a break on tolls, and even included an offer to operate the system at cost—the state garnering all the tolls. This offer too was declined, and in 1827 in a separate amending act, the state authorized the Delaware Canal, which was delayed for a few more years costing LC&N many dollars, until it was finally dug alongside, and generally in sight of the Delaware River between Easton down river to Bristol. When completed in 1832 by the state it also didn't work—having leaking issues and water supply problems like those that plagued the Union Canal and Schuylkill Navigation, and the state needed to hire Josiah White to fix it before it became fully usable in 1834. Lehigh Coal & Navigation Company would operate the Canal into the 1930s, and controlled its resources and those rights attained on the Lehigh until the 1960s when they reverted or conveyed back to the state.

As Philadelphia saw improved commerce on the Lehigh and Schuylkill Rivers (Note: there were at least 17 efforts—most largely publicly funded—to improve navigability of the Schuylkill before 1818), though in 1824 both systems needed further development, a larger interconnected canal system was envisioned by New Jersey and Pennsylvanian businessmen operating in the city. While these businessmen urged local government officials to construct more canals, the same officials were also continually reading the press coverage around the building of the Erie Canal - construction updates, works designs and engineering feats - which was expected to massively boost the economy of New York City. Philadelphia's luminaries were vying with other coastal cities to become the United States' most important and influential port, as the country's population expanded westward to the Ohio Country and Northwest Territory regions. Constructing additional canals would also improve urban access to clean-burning anthracite coal; eastern cities in Pennsylvania and New Jersey had already consumed much of the eastern forests for heating fuel. Additional canals would improve access to the newly-opened Coal Region in Northeastern Pennsylvania: the initial mines in the Panther Creek Valley, a further extension of the Lehigh Canal up to White Haven, and a railroad connecting that upper canal with the coal sources in the Wyoming Valley.

== List of works ==
The rail portions of the system were authorized in 1828 by an act of the Pennsylvania General Assembly entitled An act relative to the Pennsylvania Canal, and to provide for the commencement of a Railroad to be constructed at the expense of the state and to be styled "The Pennsylvania Railroad" (Act of March 24, 1828, Pamph. Laws, p. 221).

Begun with Navigations construction along the Susquehanna and the West Fork of the Susquehanna with surveys for the best route over the barrier of the northern Allegheny Mountains, the system in time ran from Philadelphia on the Delaware estuary westwards across the great plain of southern Pennsylvania (goal of connecting the Susquehanna to New York City via canals) through Harrisburg and across the state to Pittsburgh and connected with other divisions of the Pennsylvania Canal. It consisted of the following principal sections, moving from east to west:

- Philadelphia and Columbia Railroad: 82 miles (132 km) from Philadelphia to Columbia near the former ferry site known as Wright's Ferry, in Lancaster County. Originally expected to be a bona fide canal in the 1820s conception, the easternmost leg of the Pennsylvania Canal was to be a continuation of the first funded and more difficult to construct engineering navigations and construction farther west in less populated rural regions. The canal joining the Delaware and Susquehanna rivers was to run across the most populated expanse of Pennsylvania's Great Valley region (and so was delayed politically in part) but its planning was overtaken by the growth of railroad technology, which by the mid-1830s had demonstrated sufficient promise to adopt the new technology for the leg of the capability and funding and construction was shifted to a railroad—it was faster and cheaper to build above ground and make bridges than it was to dig a deep ditch and provide it with reliable water supplies to enable two way barge traffic.
- Eastern Division Canal: 43 miles (69 km) from Columbia to Duncan's Island at the mouth of the Juniata River.
- Juniata Division Canal: 127 miles (204 km) from Duncan's Island to Hollidaysburg
- Allegheny Portage Railroad: 36 miles (58 km) from Hollidaysburg to Johnstown
- Western Division Canal: 103 miles (166 km) from Johnstown to the terminus in Pittsburgh.

The canals reduced travel time between Philadelphia and Pittsburgh from at least 23 days to just four.

The Main Line of Public Works was completed in 1834 and was sold to the Pennsylvania Railroad on June 25, 1857, for $7,500,000. Within a year, the PRR replaced the Philadelphia-Pittsburgh route with an entirely rail-based system.

== Philadelphia and Columbia Railroad ==
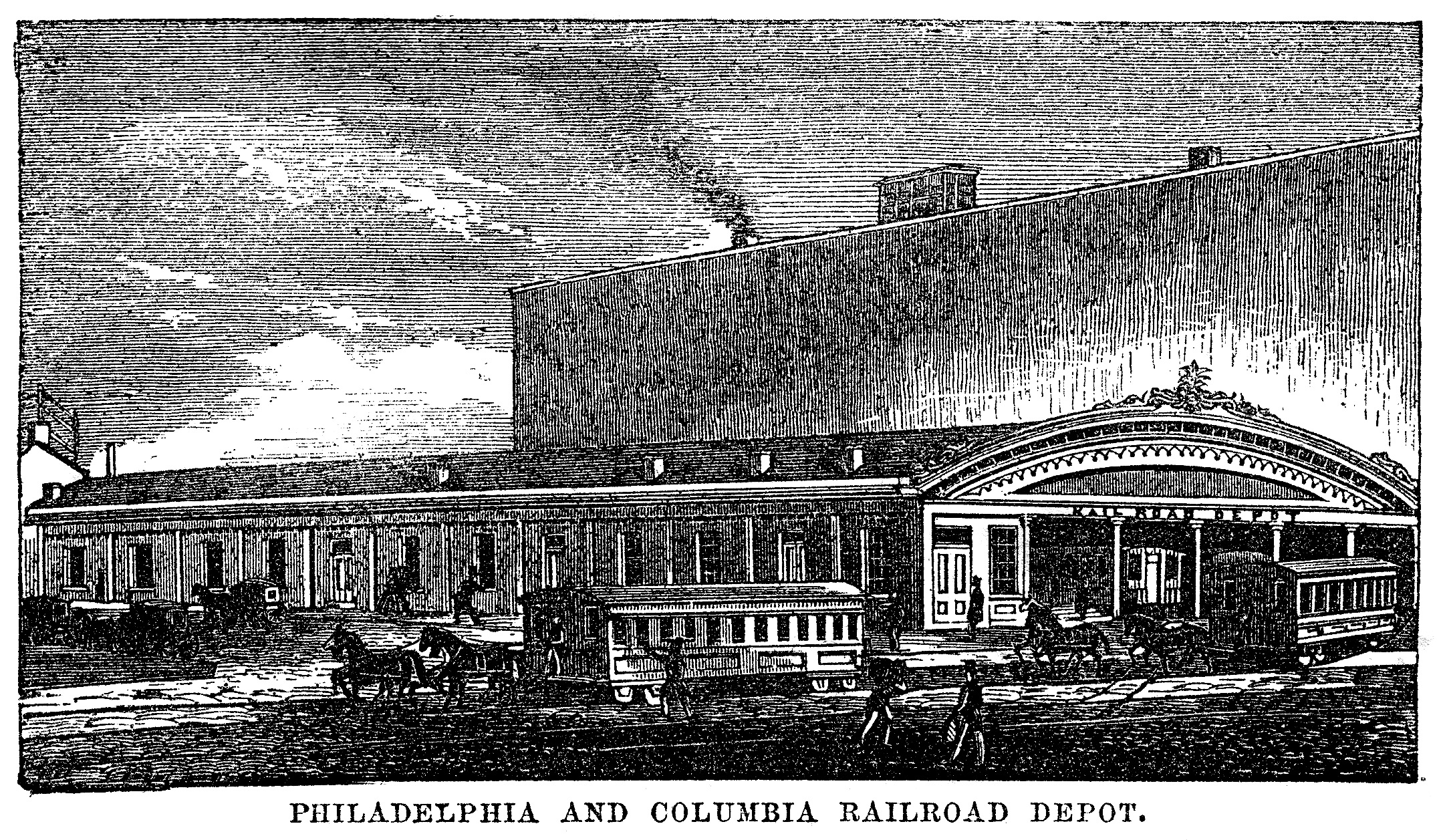
An 1854 illustration of the Philadelphia and Columbia Railroad Depot

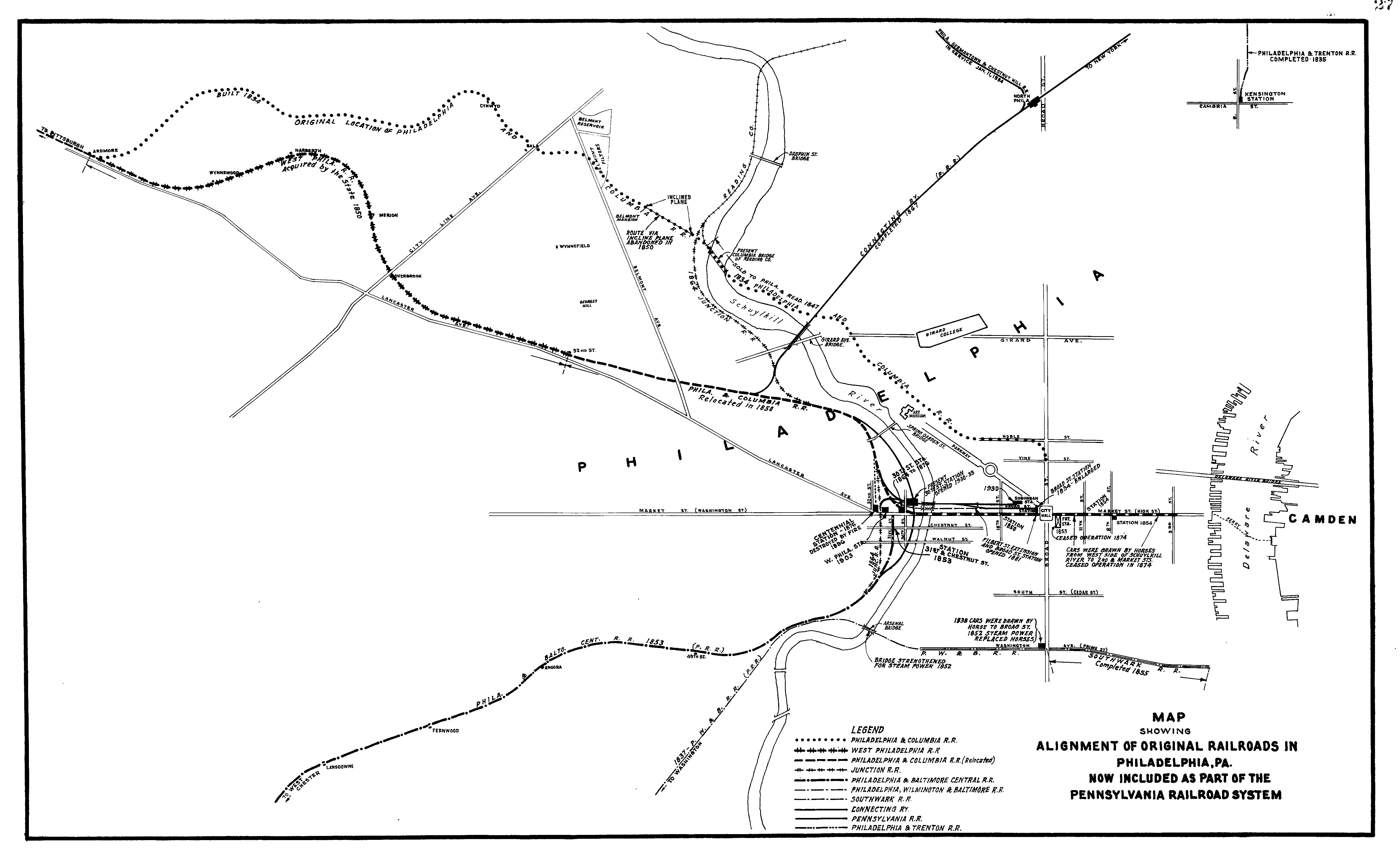
Railroads in Philadelphia that became a part of the Pennsylvania Railroad

The Philadelphia and Columbia Railroad began in Philadelphia at Broad and Vine Streets, ran north on Broad and west on Pennsylvania Avenue, a segment later taken over and submerged and tunneled over by the Reading Railroad, then headed northwest across the Columbia Bridge over the Schuylkill River. Just after crossing the river, it traveled up the Belmont Plane, an inclined plane in the current location of West Fairmount Park, and continued west across the eastern part of the state to Columbia, where the Columbia Plane headed down to the Susquehanna River. At that point, the eastern division of the canal continued north along the river and then west.

The Northern Liberties and Penn Township Railroad was incorporated in 1829 to build a branch continuing east on Noble Street and Willow Street to the Delaware River. This opened in 1834.

=== Belmont Plane ===
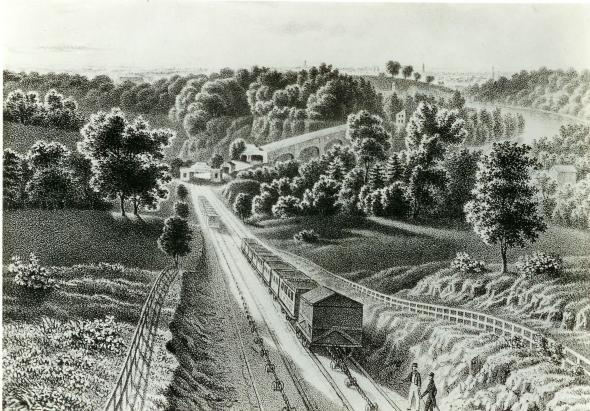
View of the Inclined Plane, near Philadelphia, an 1838 portrait

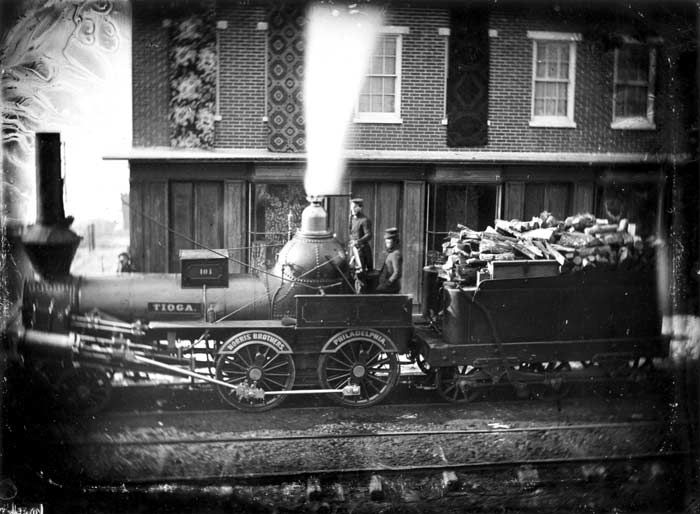
A Tioga Locomotive in 1848

The Belmont Plane ran from the Schuylkill River for 2,805 feet (855 m), rising 1 foot (0.3 m) per 15 feet (4.6 m) for a total rise of 187 feet (57 m). Steam-driven cables dragged the railway cars to the top of Belmont Hill.

The Plane was the site of a signal event in railroad history. On July 10, 1836, the Philadelphia-based Norris Locomotive Works drove a 4-2-0 locomotive up the Incline, making it the first steam locomotive to climb an ascending grade while pulling a load. The 14,400-pound (6,500 kg) engine, named George Washington, hauled a load of 19,200 pounds (8,709 kg), including 24 people riding on the tender and one freight car, up the grade at 15 miles (24 km) per hour. So remarkable was this accomplishment that reports in engineering journals doubted its occurrence. Nine days later, the engine repeated the feat in a more formal trial with an even greater load.

In 1850, the state bought the West Philadelphia Railroad, which had been incorporated in 1835 to bypass the Belmont Plane and failed after completing only the section from 52nd Street west to the main line at Rosemont. The state built the rest from 52nd Street east to downtown, but on a different alignment than the one originally planned; the new line, put into operation October 15, 1850, ended at the west end of the Market Street Bridge, from which the City Railroad continued east. The old line, which ran from the Schuylkill River up the Belmont Plane to Ardmore along the route of present-day Montgomery Avenue in Lower Merion Township, was abandoned.

The Columbia Bridge and line east to Broad and Vine Streets were sold to the Philadelphia and Reading Railroad as part of its main line. The Reading acquired the Northern Liberties and Penn Township Railroad in 1870, giving it access to the Delaware River.

The section of the old Pennsylvania Railroad running from Philadelphia west through Chester County and, by extension, the western suburbs of Philadelphia, is still known as the Main Line.

The Columbia Plane, which lowered railway cars down to the Eastern Division Canal along the Susquehanna River, was bypassed in 1840 by a new track alignment.

== Eastern Division Canal ==
The Pennsylvania Canal's Eastern Division, which opened in 1833, ran 43 miles (69 km) along the east side of the Susquehanna River between Columbia and Duncan's Island at the mouth of the Juniata River. The canal included 14 locks with an average lift of 7.5 feet (2.3 m). The state originally planned a canal of 24 miles (39 km) running between the Union Canal at Middletown to the Juniata. However, the plan changed in 1828, when the state opted to extend the Eastern Division 19 miles (31 km) further south to connect with the newly decided replacement of a canal by the Philadelphia and Columbia Railroad at historic Wright's Ferry.

Engineers faced complications at the northern end of the Eastern Division Canal, where it met the Juniata Division Canal and the Susquehanna Division Canal at Duncan's Island. Boats had to cross from one side of the Susquehanna River to the other between either the Susquehanna Division or the Juniata Division on the west side and the Eastern Division on the east side. They solved the problem by building a dam 1,998 feet (609 m) long and 8.5 feet (2.6 m) high between the lower end of Duncan's Island and the east bank of the Susquehanna. This formed a pool across which boats could be pulled from a wooden, two-tier towpath bridge at Clark's Ferry. Two Duncan's Island lift locks raised or lowered the boats traveling between the dam pool and the other canals.

== Juniata Division Canal ==
- Pennsylvania Main Line Canal, Juniata Division, Canal Section
- U.S. National Register of Historic Places
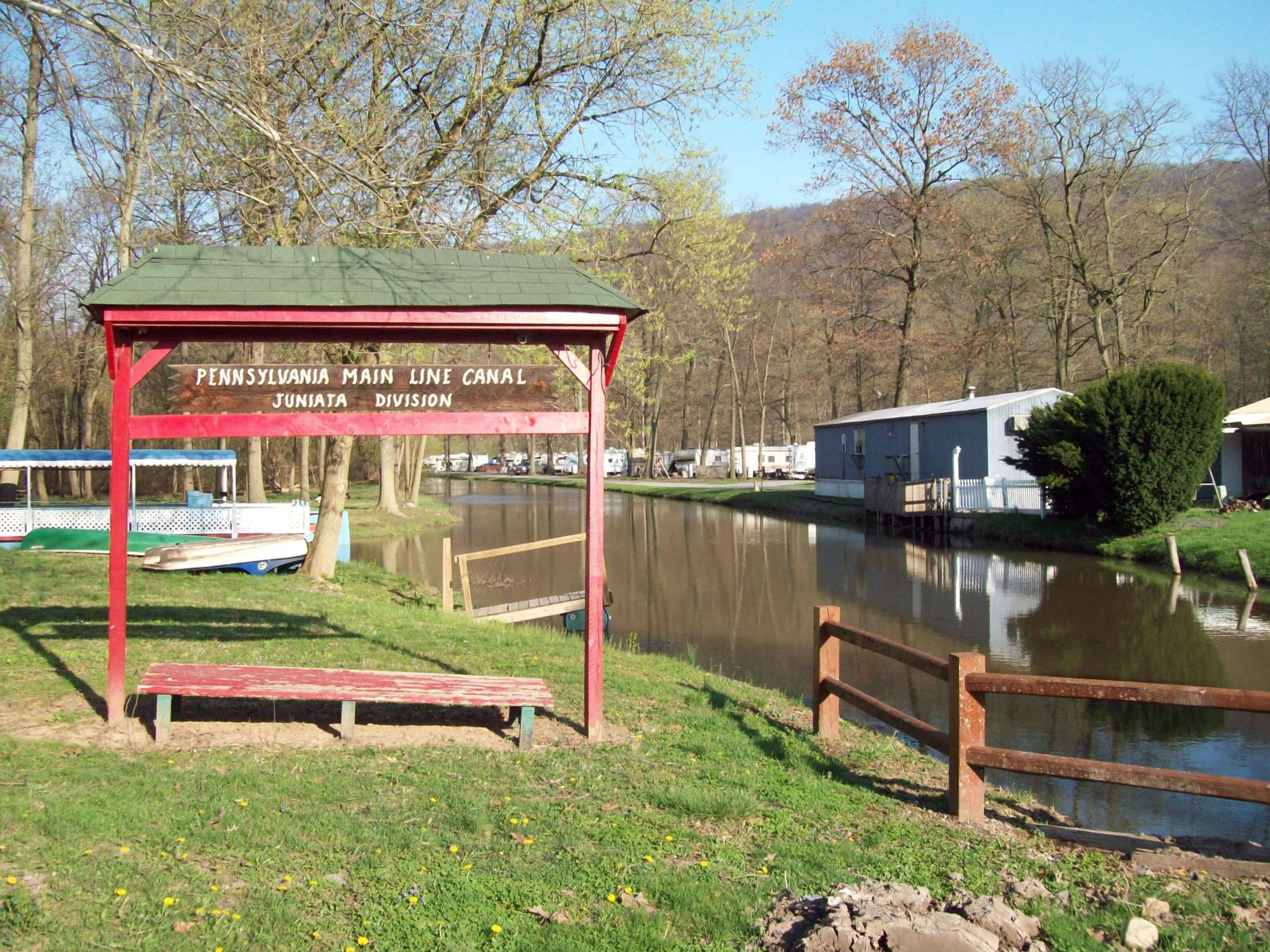
- Pennsylvania Main Line Canal, Juniata Division, April 2010

- Location within Pennsylvania
- Location: 1.5 mi. section of canal bet. PA RR Main Line and Juniata River, Granville Township, Pennsylvania
- Area: 13.6 acres (5.5 ha)
- Built: 1830
- Built by: DeWitt Clinton, Jr.
- Architect: DeWitt Clinton, Jr.
- Architectural style: Canal
- NRHP reference No.: 02000069
- Added to NRHP: February 20, 2002

The Juniata Division Canal was approved in segments starting in 1827 with a canal from near Duncan's Island in the Susquehanna River to Lewistown, 40 miles (64 km) upstream. Subsequently, the state agreed to extend the canal to Hollidaysburg and the eastern end of the Allegheny Portage Railroad, 127 miles (204 km) from the Susquehanna. A total of 86 locks were required to overcome a change in elevation of 584 feet (178 m) over the full length of the canal, which opened in 1832.

From the canal basin, westbound boats began their journey by being elevated about 10 feet (3 m) by a lock that brought them to the level of a wooden aqueduct on which they were towed 600 feet (183 m) to the south side of the Juniata. At North's Island, 18 miles (29 km) from the Susquehanna, they were towed by a water powered continuous rope to the north side of the river across a slack water pool formed by a dam. From North's Island to Huntingdon, the river was dammed in three more places to feed water to the canal, and above Huntingdon, 14 more dams were needed to create 16 miles (26 km) of slack water navigation in the river to supplement 22 miles (35 km) of travel in segments of canal. In addition, the state built three reservoirs on Juniata tributaries to keep the upper parts of the canal filled with water.

=== Remnants ===
A canal section of 1.5 miles (2.4 km) has been restored near Locust Campground, 3 miles (4.8 km) west of Lewistown. At the western end of the canal, the Hollidaysburg Canal Basin Park has preserved two canal basins and a connecting lock; a museum at the park illustrates how canal boats transferred between the canal and the Allegheny Portage Railroad.

The Pennsylvania Main Line Canal, Juniata Division, Canal Section was added to the National Register of Historic Places in 2002.

== Allegheny Portage Railroad ==
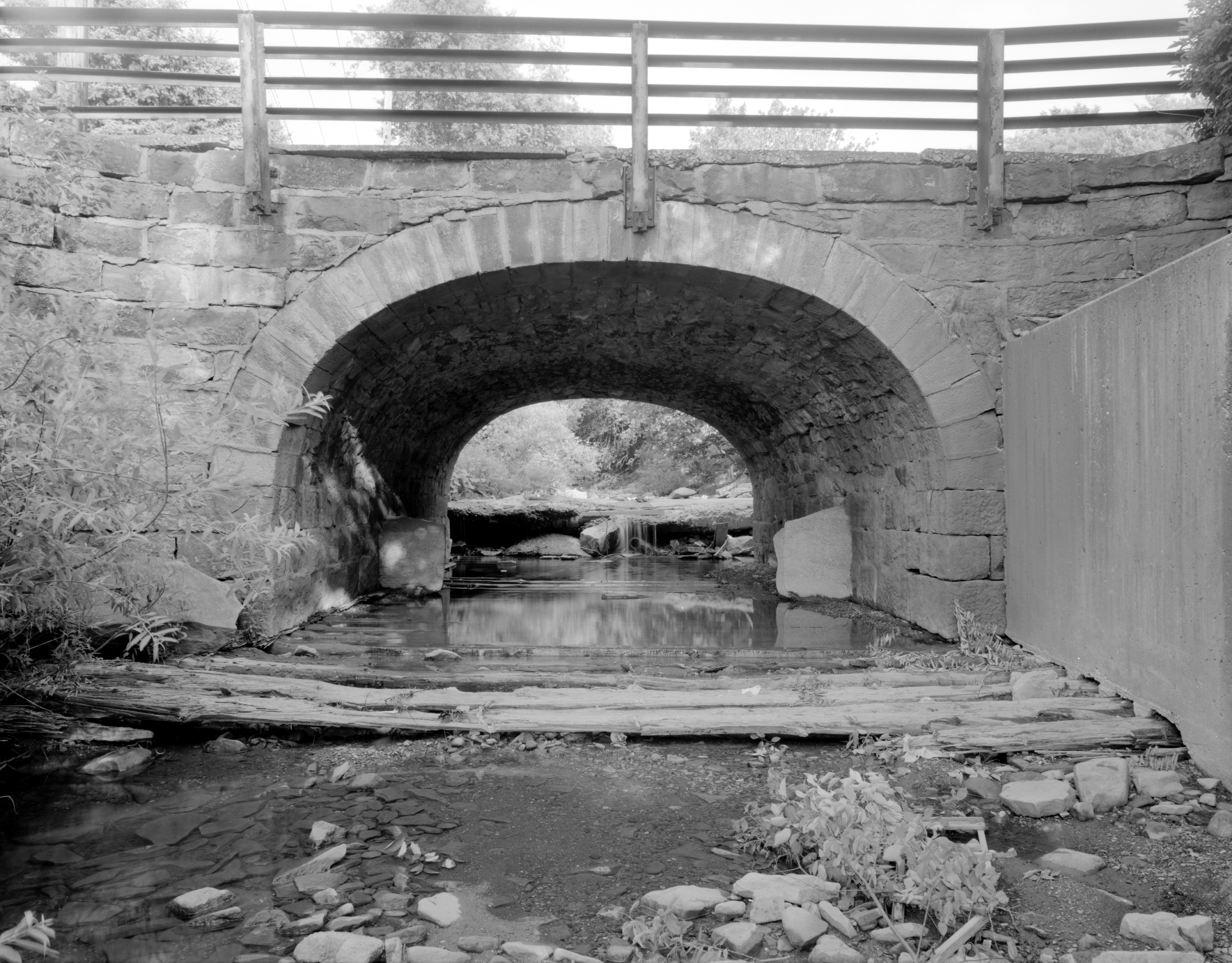
Lilly Culvert under the railroad

From 1834 until 1854, when the Pennsylvania Railroad Company finished a competing line, the Allegheny Portage Railroad made continuous boat traffic possible over the Allegheny Mountains between the Juniata and Western Division Canals. The railroad did not unload cargo, but instead carried loaded canal boats on flatbed railroad cars over the mountains. It followed a 36-mile (58 km) route between the Juniata Canal at Hollidaysburg and the Western Division Canal at Johnstown which included 11 levels, 10 inclined planes fitted with stationary engines that could raise and lower boats and cargo, a 900-foot (270 m) viaduct over the Little Conemaugh River, and many bridges. Infrastructure included 153 drains and culverts. The railroad climbed 1,398 feet (426 m) from the eastern canal basin at Hollidaysburg and 1,171 feet (357 m) from the western basin at Johnstown. At its summit, the railroad reached an elevation of 2,322 feet (708 m) above sea level.

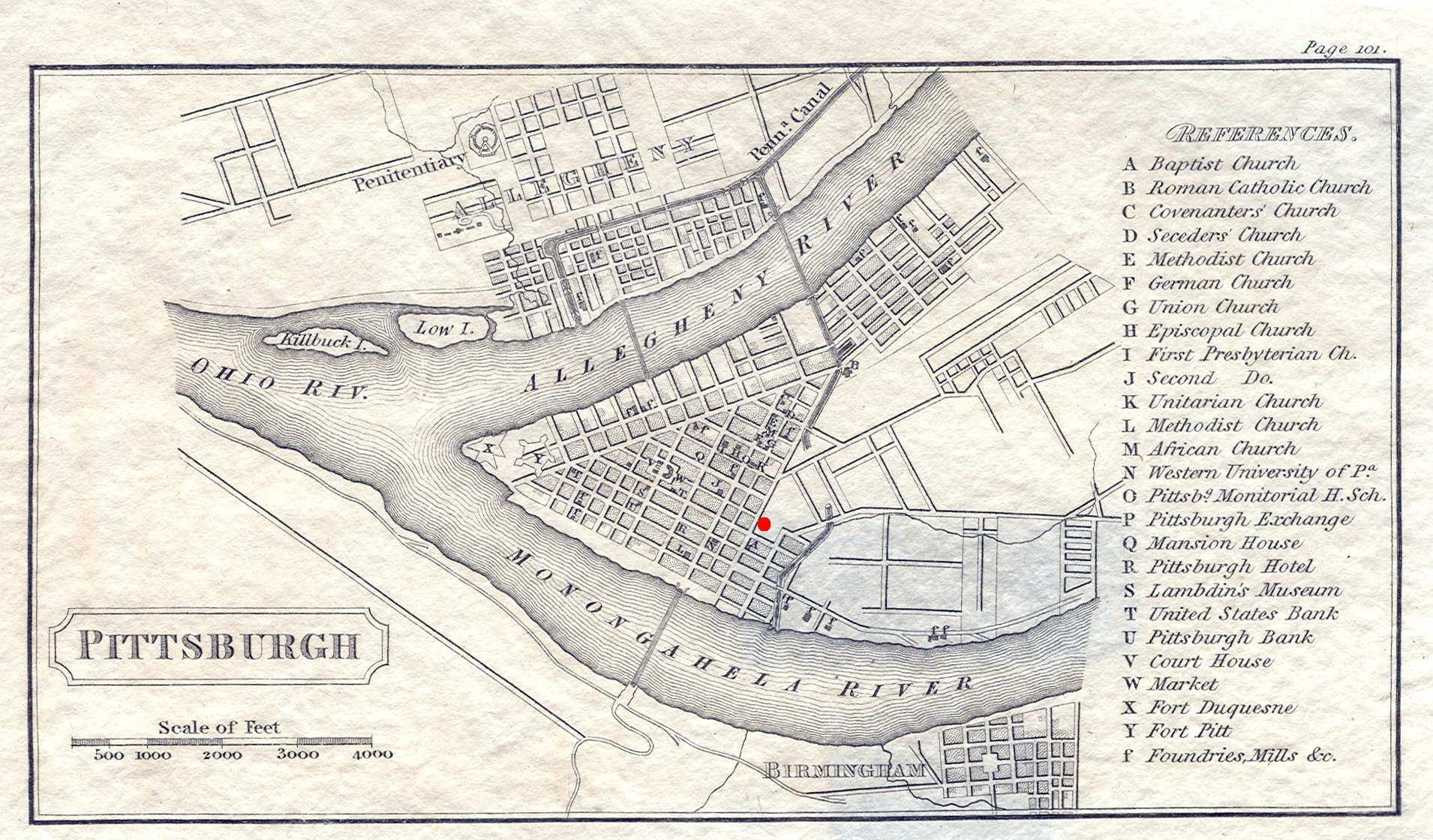
A map of downtown Pittsburgh in 1828 shows the routes of the Pennsylvania Canal in and near the city and the canal connections to the city's three rivers.

== Western Division Canal ==
- Western Division-Pennsylvania Canal
- U.S. National Register of Historic Places
- Location within Pennsylvania
- Location: Along the Conemaugh River, Bolivar, Derry Township, and Fairfield Township
- Area: 15 acres (6.1 ha)
- Built: 1830
- Built by: Pennsylvania Canal Commission
- NRHP reference No.: 74001817
- Added to NRHP: September 17, 1974

In 1826, the state legislature authorized the first segment of the Western Division Canal, from Pittsburgh up the Allegheny River to its confluence with the Kiskiminetas River at Freeport. Pittsburgh residents favored a route that would follow the south bank of the Allegheny River and terminate in Pittsburgh, while residents of the borough of Allegheny favored a north bank canal ending in the borough, across the river from Pittsburgh. Eventually, the canal was run along the physically more favorable north bank, but the state agreed to build the main terminal and turning basin in Pittsburgh and a secondary terminal and connecting canal, the Allegheny Outlet, in the borough. Getting the main canal across the Allegheny River into Pittsburgh required an aqueduct of 1,140 feet (347 m), the longest on the Pennsylvania Main Line route. Linking to the Ohio River at Pittsburgh, the Western Division Canal also linked, through a tunnel of 810 feet (250 m) under Grant's Hill in Pittsburgh, with the Monongahela River.

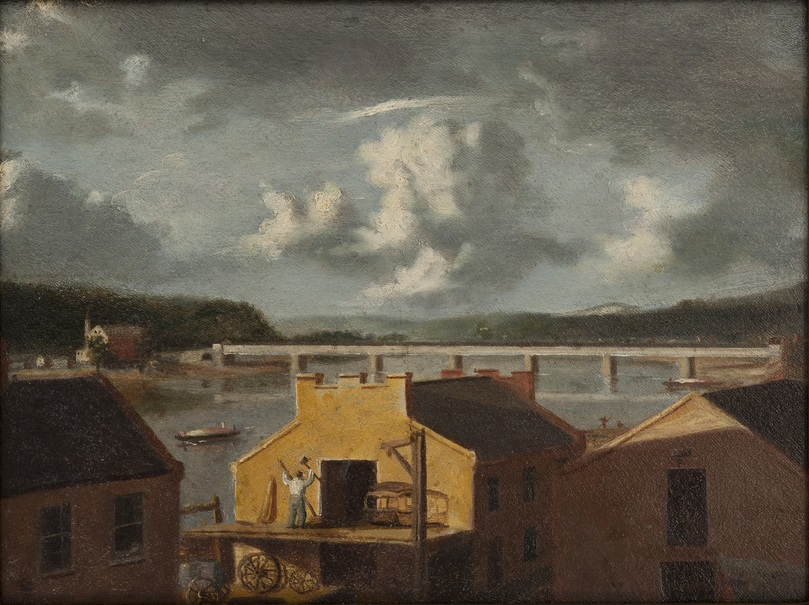
Painting of the Pennsylvania Canal Aqueduct, Pittsburgh, by Russell Smith, c. 1832

Subsequent Western Division Canal extensions went from Freeport up the Kiskiminetas and Conemaugh Rivers to Blairsville and then to the western end of the Allegheny Portage Railroad at Johnstown. East of Tunnelton, the route went through a canal tunnel of 817 feet (249 m) built to avoid a long loop of the Conemaugh River. The first fully loaded freight boat traveled from Johnstown to Pittsburgh in 1831; the route through Grant's Hill opened in 1832. Over its length of 104 miles (167 km), the canal employed 68 locks, 16 river dams, and 16 aqueducts. From Freeport, a separate extension, the Kittanning Feeder, ran 14 miles (23 km) up the Allegheny River to Kittanning.

=== Johnstown Flood ===
The 1889 Johnstown Flood was caused by the failure of the South Fork Dam, part of the Main Line of Public Works. The dam across the Little Conemaugh River in the hills above Johnstown, Pennsylvania, created a two-square-mile (5.2 km^{2}) reservoir. Dubbed Lake Conemaugh, it supplied water to the Western Division Canal. When canal traffic declined, the lake and dam were abandoned, then sold to the Pennsylvania Railroad in 1857; the railroad in turn sold them to private interests. They were purchased by the South Fork Fishing and Hunting Club in 1879, and a private resort was built surrounding the lake. On May 31, 1889, following heavy rains, the South Fork Dam failed, sending 20 million tons (18.2 million cubic meters) of water down the gorge toward Johnstown. More than 2,200 people were killed.

=== Remnants ===
The Tunnelview Historical Site shows where in 1830 a canal tunnel of 817 feet (249 m) was built through Bow Ridge to avoid a long bend on the Conemaugh River, 10 miles (16 km) west of Blairsville. Saltsburg Canal Park, where Loyalhanna Creek joins the Conemaugh River to form the Kiskiminetas River, recognizes the canal's economic contribution to Saltsburg.

== Points of interest ==
Feature	Coordinates	Description
Philadelphia	39°57′08″N 75°09′50″W	City at the eastern terminus of the Main Line of Public Works and the Columbia–Philadelphia Railroad
Columbia	40°02′01″N 76°30′16″W	Borough at the western terminus of the Philadelphia and Columbia Railroad and the southern terminus of the Eastern Division Canal
Duncan's Island	40°25′02″N 77°00′33″W.	Island at the northern terminus of the Eastern Division Canal and the eastern terminus of the Juniata Division Canal
Lewistown	40°35′57″N 77°34′17″W	Borough at the western terminus of the Juniata Division Canal and the eastern terminus of the Allegheny Portage Railroad
Hollidaysburg	40°25′38″N 78°23′20″W	Borough at the western terminus of the Juniata Division Canal and the eastern terminus of the Allegheny Portage Railroad
Johnstown	40°19′36″N 78°55′19″W	City at the western terminus of the Allegheny Portage Railroad and the eastern terminus of the Western Division Canal
Pittsburgh	40°26′26″N 79°59′45″W	City at the western terminus of the Main Line of Public Works and the Western Division Canal
Kittanning	40°48′59″N 79°31′19″W	Borough at the northern terminus of the Kittanning Feeder Canal

== See also ==
- Allegheny Portage Railroad
- Delaware and Hudson Canal
- Delaware Canal, aka later: Pennsylvania Canal (Delaware Division)
- List of canals in the United States
- Lehigh Canal
- Pennsylvania Canal System

- Pennsylvania Canal, aka later: Pennsylvania Canal (Eastern Division)
- Pennsylvania Canal (North Branch Division)
- Pennsylvania Canal (Susquehanna Division)
- Pennsylvania Canal (West Branch Division)
- Pennsylvania Canal Guard Lock and Feeder Dam, Raystown Branch
- Pennsylvania Canal Tunnel
- Pennsylvania Canal and Limestone Run Aqueduct

- Schuylkill Canal
