= Union Canal (Pennsylvania) =

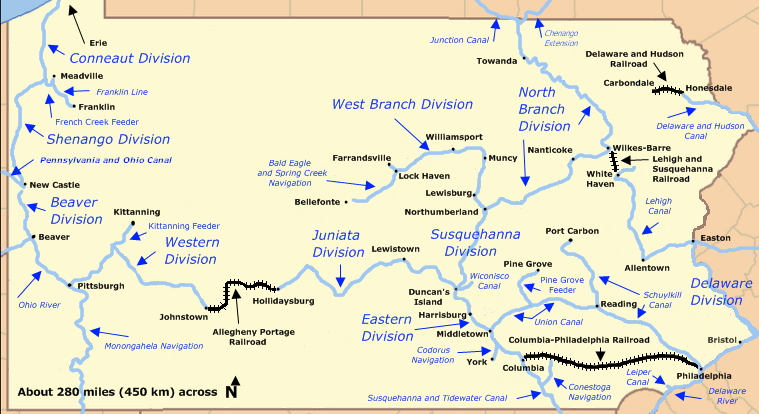
- Map of Pennsylvania's historic canals and connecting railroads
- Interactive map of Union Canal

Specifications
- Locks: 93
- Status: Abandoned except for historic interest

History
- Original owner: Union Canal Company
- Principal engineer: Canvass White
- Construction began: 1811
- Date completed: 1828
- Date closed: 1885

Geography
- Start point: Reading, Pennsylvania, U.S.
- End point: Middletown, Pennsylvania, U.S.
- Branch: Branch Canal to Pine Grove
- Connects to: Schuylkill Canal, Pennsylvania Canal (Eastern Division)

The Union Canal was a towpath canal that existed in southeastern Pennsylvania in the United States during the 19th century. First proposed in 1690 to connect Philadelphia with the Susquehanna River, it ran approximately 82 mi from Middletown on the Susquehanna below Harrisburg to Reading on the Schuylkill River.

== History ==
=== 18th century ===
Construction began in 1792 during George Washington's administration, but financial difficulties delayed its completion until 1828. Called the "Golden Link," it provided a critical early transportation route for shipping anthracite coal and lumber eastward to Philadelphia. Closed in the 1880s, remnants of the canal remain, most notably the Union Canal Tunnel, a hand-built engineering marvel that is the oldest existing transportation tunnel in the United States. The tunnel is a National Historic Landmark.

The idea of uniting the Schuylkill and Susquehanna rivers by a canal was first proposed and discussed by William Penn in 1690. Penn's plan, conceived a few years after he had founded Philadelphia was to make "a second settlement" on the Susquehanna river, similar in size to that of Philadelphia itself. He made this plan, titled "Some Proposals for a Second Settlement in the Province of Pennsylvania" public in England in 1690. The route envisioned by Penn was a road up the west bank of the Schuylkill to the mouth of French Creek near present-day Phoenixville heading west to the Susquehanna via present day Lancaster and a Susquehanna tributary, Conestoga Creek. Although Penn first proposed the project of continuous water transportation from the Delaware to the Susquehanna, he did not call for the building of a canal.

The canal scheme was first proposed by the Society for the Improvement of Roads and Inland Navigation organized in 1789 with preeminent, wartime financier Robert Morris as president, David Rittenhouse, William Smith and John Nicolson. In 1791, the Society presented proposals to the State of Pennsylvania proposing to connect the Atlantic seaboard with Lake Erie. This Pennsylvania plan was before the creation of New York's Western and Northern Inland Lock Navigation Companies in 1792. The New York plan took the first steps to improve navigation on the Mohawk River by constructing a canal between the Mohawk and Lake Ontario but that effort with private financing was insufficient. In the Pennsylvania plan, the Society proposed a canal route, 426 miles in length connecting Philadelphia with Pittsburgh by a canal. One part of this project was a canal segment up to the Schuylkill River to Tulpehocken Creek to a summit-level canal near Lebanon and thence by way of the Quitapahilla and Swatara creeks to the Susquehanna River.

This action resulted in the formation of the Schuylkill and Susquehanna Navigation Company incorporated on September 29, 1791, to open a communication between the Schuylkill and Susquehanna rivers from Reading on the Schuylkill to Middletown on the Susquehanna with Robert Morris as the president of companies.

The original engineering concept developed by the Society as well as the navigation company's charter had been to build a canal up to the Schuylkill Valley to Norristown, improving the Schuylkill river from there to Reading; while from Reading a canal was to extend to the Susquehanna, via Lebanon. This would have required a four-mile summit crossing between Tulpehocken and the Quitipahilla with an artificial waterway connecting two separate river valleys; namely the Susquehanna and the Schuylkill watersheds. Its successful completion would have made the middle reach, the first summit-level canal in the United States. The term refers to a canal that rises then falls, as opposed to a lateral canal, which has a continuous fall only. In this case, the proposed canal at 80 miles in length would rise 192 feet over 42 miles from the west at the Susquehanna river to the summit and then fall 311 feet over 34 miles to the Schuylkill river to the east. It was to be the "golden link" between Philadelphia and the vast interior of Pennsylvania and beyond.

This proposed summit crossing offered a severe test of 18th-century engineering skills, materials and construction techniques. For both designing and operating a water-conveyance transportation system through an area where sinkholes are common, and surface water is scarce. Ultimately, the 1794 engineering concept was flawed as the water supply for the summit crossing was inadequate and the technology for minimizing supply losses was still another several decades into the future. By 1796, however, the navigation company's project was a commercial failure. The result was that with the onset of the Erie canal still some thirty years into the future, Philadelphia lost the early initiative in water transportation.

Despite the termination of construction in 1796, the company managed to forestall foreclosure on its property and constructed works.

=== 19th century ===
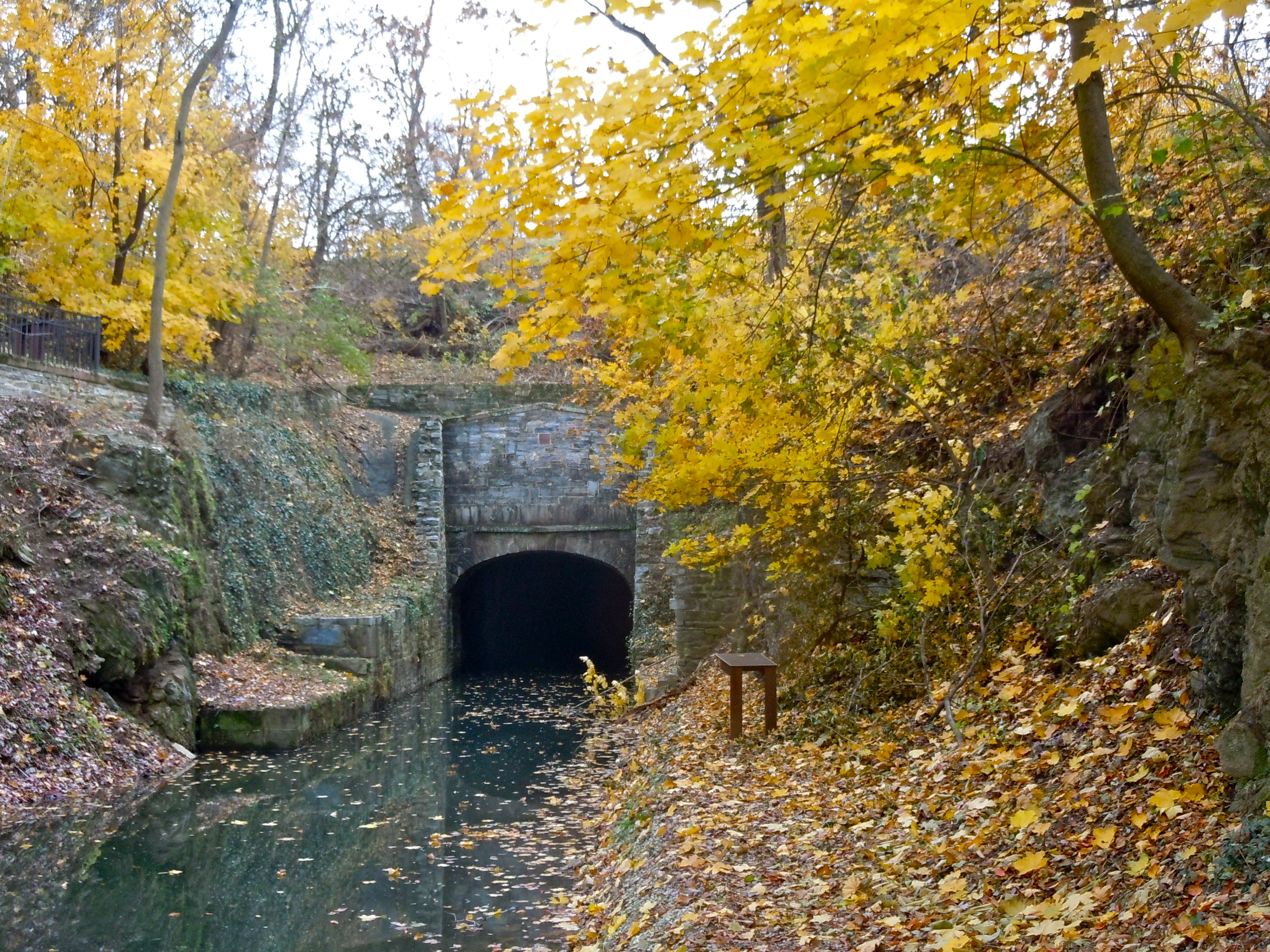
North entrance of the 729-foot (222 m) Union Canal tunnel made through difficult geologic formations

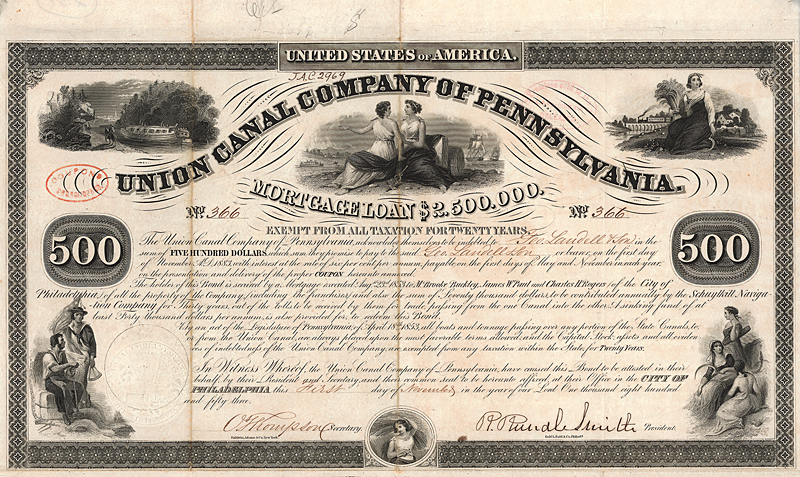
Bond of the Union Canal Company of Pennsylvania from November 1, 1853

In 1802, the company had to fend off such an attempt and was only successful in holding onto its property and water rights through the sale of excess property, often whole farms were sold. Although originally set to expire in 1801, the company's corporate charter was extended in 1806 to 1820. In 1807, Charles Gottfried Paleske (1758-1816) was elected to the Board of Directors of the company and working with James Milnor, Robert Brooke, Isaac Roberdeau, and John Scott walked "... the line of the Schuylkill & Susquehanna Navigation Company from Kruitzer's plantation where the canal ends to the end of the summit near Kucher's mill, about 9 miles; find the work in good condition including the five locks at Ley's, and the bridges decayed or collapsed ..."

In 1808, Paleske was elected president and Joseph S. Lewis as treasurer. In 1809, the company's directors appointed a committee to draft articles for a merger with the Delaware and Schuylkill Canal company which was submitted to the State legislature. In 1810, William John Duane, writing as "Franklin" advocates for reviving the Schuylkill and Susquehanna Navigation company as part of a scheme for a canal route to Lake Erie instead of the Ohio Valley in a series of letters in his Aurora and in his published letters, "To the People of Pennsylvania Respecting the Internal Improvement of the Commonwealth by Means of Roads and Canals."

With the establishment of constitutional government in 1789 following the American Revolutionary War, the financial condition of the country improved. While credit was more plentiful than it had been for a half-century and the population growing ..."came increasing and insistent demands for ... improved transportation facilities." Regular tax revenues to the State were insufficient and could only be remedied by what seemed like at the time to be "abnormal increases in taxation." One remedy that had been used in the past was that of authorizing lotteries to raise funds, but only, for "important public purposes". In 1795, the State had authorized $400,000 for the Union canal's predecessor corporation, the Schuylkill & Susquehanna Navigation and Delaware and Schuylkill Canal companies. While there were numerous abuses of the lottery system in terms of complaints but the biggest problem was that of numerous "foreign" lotteries.

Until the passage of the act for the "entire abolition of lotteries" by the State of Pennsylvania in 1833, "(F)oreign advertisements were to be found in nearly every issue of the county and city newspapers. They were especially evident after 1820, 324 Lotteries in Pennsylvania Prior to 1833. when it was not unusual to find four or more different foreign lottery advertisements in a single issue of a paper. During the entire period they were probably three times as numerous as those of lotteries chartered by the Legislature of Pennsylvania. In a single issue of the Greensburgh Gazette, on May 12, 1826, advertisements for the Connecticut State Lottery, The New York Literature Lottery, Maryland University Lottery, Mr. Jefferson's Lottery, The Grand Consolidated Lottery (New York), and only one Pennsylvania lottery, The Union Canal Lottery. Similar illustrations from papers throughout the state might be given. Many brokers in nearby states ran advertisements regularly in the county papers in Pennsylvania." But most importantly, the result was that "...many Pennsylvania authorized lotteries remained uncompleted or underfunded for years."

"The most striking illustration of this ...(problem with foreign lotteries) ... was the case of the lottery chartered in 1795 to raise $400,000 to aid in the completion of the ...(Schuylkill & Susquehanna and Delaware and Schuylkill Canals). After sixteen years, during which this lottery had schemes almost constantly before the public, only $60,000 of the $400,000 had been raised, due to the inability of the managers to sell their tickets."

The most important single lottery in terms of number of tickets and in the value of prizes in the early history of state lotteries was the Union Canal Lottery authorized in 1811 but it was to be managed by the Lehigh Coal & Navigation Company and the Union Canal Company, respectively. The 1811 acts of authorization prohibited the use of any of the lottery funds as dividends paid to stockholders. The Union canal's incorporation permitted it to raise by means of a lottery $340,000, the exact amount that was left uncompleted by the predecessor companies in 1795.

Between 1811 and 1821, even with this lottery effort, the company was unable to attract sufficient capital to complete the proposed canals and to keep them in repairs. In 1821, the legislature permitted the company to continue to raise by lottery for twenty-five years sufficient funds to enable the company to pay six percent dividends to stockholders.

Between 1811 and December 31, 1833, the company conducted about fifty different lottery schemes and awarded in prizes more than $33,000,000. In 1832, the lottery paid $5,216,240.100. It was not a success for the company though as the lottery had been planned to provide a 15% return, in reality, it was below 5%. Throughout the entire period it was authorized, the lotteries were to be found in nearly every issue of the city and county papers of Pennsylvania as well as throughout the United States. The State lottery to funds the canal construction is "... one of the best-known lotteries in the history of this country."

The largest cities on the East Coast were experiencing an energy crisis with large stands of forest were no longer available near enough to the cities to practically bring in wood for fuel and charcoal production. Cities were beginning to import smoky, sooty bituminous coal from England and Virginia and a new source of energy was needed. The project was given a new push by industrialists in New Jersey and Philadelphia. Josiah White, an industrialist, discovered how to properly burn anthracite in 1808. Large deposits of anthracite were found within 100 miles of Philadelphia over a decade earlier, but overland transportation by mule train of bulk commodities was extremely costly. Local rivers were rapids strewn and ran fast, not shallow and well behaved. By the end of the War of 1812, industrialists were getting desperate for fuels—mills and manufacturies were sometimes forced into going quiet for days. White and others pushed for canal funding, applied for rights to improve navigations on the Schuylkill, and eventually split off when he disagreed with other investors as the best way to proceed.

Construction resumed in 1821, probably in response to the successful improvements along the Lehigh Canal designed by White and the Lehigh Coal & Navigation Company, which was founded in 1818 to regularly deliver growing amounts of anthracite coal from Summit Hill, Pennsylvania to the fuel starved coastal cities. One of the principal challenges was the construction of a 729-foot (222 m) tunnel through the ridge separating the headwaters of Quittapahilla Creek and Clarks Run. The drilling of the tunnel was by hand, using gunpowder to blast though argillaceous slate with veins of hard flinty limestone 80 feet (24 m) below the summit of the ridge. The progress of the tunnel was approximately 15 ft (4.5 m) per week, requiring over two years to complete. Another engineering difficulty was the lack of a sufficient continual supply of water at the summit level, a task that was compounded by leakage and required an elaborate pumping mechanism.

Although the initial design called for the construction of a canal from the Susquehanna to the Delaware, the 1825 opening of the rival Schuylkill Navigation from Reading to Philadelphia prompted the Union Canal Company to focus solely on the Middletown-Reading portion of the canal, which when connected would complete the longer conveyance west to the Susquehanna.

The canal was completed in 1828 under the direction of Canvass White, the preeminent canal engineer of the day. Upon its completion it was 8-1/2 ft (2.6 m) wide and had 93 locks. In 1832 a 22-mile (35 km) branch canal was constructed northward from the water works along the Swatara Creek to Pine Grove. The branch canal served as feeder for the summit level as well as allowing the transport of anthracite from the mountains, which became the principal revenue source for the canal operation.

The charter of the canal company allowed it to build lateral railroad lines from the canal to reach coal mines. It built a 3.5-mile (5.6 km) line from the end of the branch canal to Lorberry Junction in 1830, which was operated by horse power. This connected it to the Lorberry Creek Railroad and brought coal traffic to the canal. In 1844, the track was leased to the Swatara Railroad, which extensively refurbished the right-of-way and began to operate it by steam locomotive in about 1850.

By the 1840s, the narrow size of the canal locks prevented the passage of the larger barges that were adopted for use on the Pennsylvania Main Line and Schuylkill Navigation. The existing width restricted barges to 25 short tons (23 t). From 1841 to 1858, under the direction of chief engineer Loammi Baldwin Jr., the canal was widened to 17 ft (5.2 m) to allow the passage of the larger boats carrying 75 short tons (68 t) to 80 short tons (73 t). In the process of the rebuilding, the tunnel through the summit ridge was shortened to 600 ft (180 m). The widening of the canal allowed for a brief period of prosperity in the late 1850s and early 1860s.

In June 1862, a flood on Swatara Creek damaged the western portion of the canal, completely destroying the Pine Grove feeder upon which the canal company depended for revenue. The flood prompted costly repairs that were compounded with continual water supply problems. The connecting railroad was leased to the Philadelphia and Reading Railroad on July 26, 1862, and sold outright in January 1866. The completion of the Lebanon Valley Railroad in 1857 from Reading to Harrisburg cut into the canal revenues, forcing its closure in 1881.

=== 20th century ===
==== Preservation ====
- Union Canal Tunnel
- U.S. National Register of Historic Places
- U.S. National Historic Landmark
- Pennsylvania state historical marker
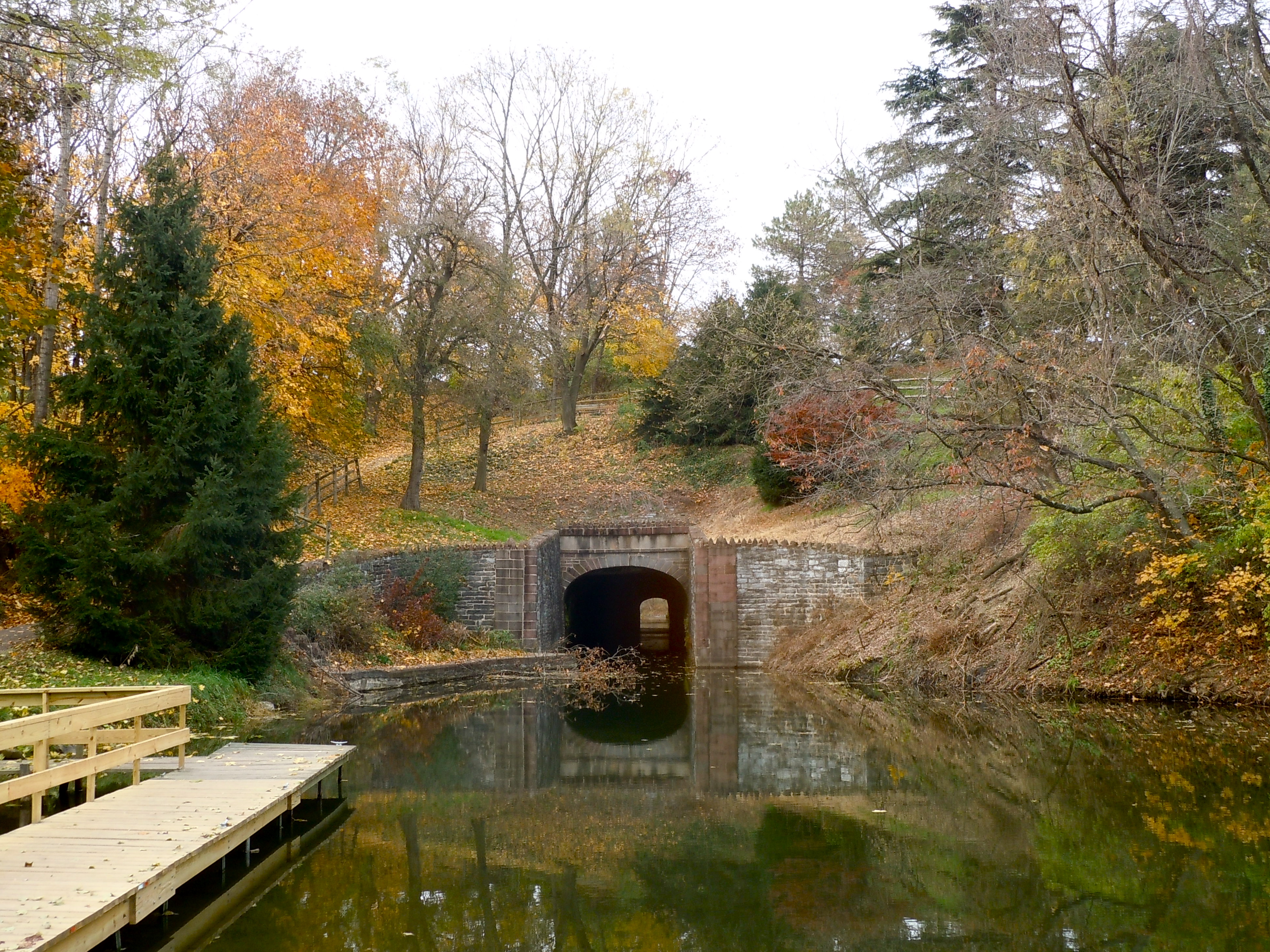
- South entrance

- Location within Pennsylvania Location within the United States
- Nearest city: Lebanon, Pennsylvania, U.S.
- Coordinates: 40°21′01″N 76°27′13″W
- Built: 1826
- Architect: Canvass White, John B. Ives
- NRHP reference No.: 74001792

Significant dates
- Added to NRHP: October 1, 1974
- Designated NHL: April 19, 1994
- Designated PHMC: March 01, 1948 and April 01, 1950

In April 1950, the Union Canal Tunnel was purchased by the Lebanon County Historical Society. The tunnel was placed on the National Register of Historic Places on October 1, 1974. It was designated a National Historic Civil Engineering Landmark by the American Society of Civil Engineers (ASCE) in 1970. On April 19, 1994, the tunnel was designated a National Historic Landmark by the Secretary of the Interior Bruce Babbitt. The tunnel is open to visitors in the Union Canal Tunnel Park.

A restored portion of the canal along Tulpehocken Creek is maintained by the Berks County Parks System at the Union Canal Towpath Park in Wyomissing west of Reading. This portion contains one previously restored lock (Lock 49E) https://www.co.berks.pa.us/Dept/Parks/Pages/Stop6Lock49E.aspx along a towpath now used as a recreational trail. A portion of the canal along Swatara Creek is also preserved at Swatara State Park where there are remains of 7 locks, a towpath bridge, major sections of the towpath, and three dams are still visible in Swatara State Park. The canal was never rebuilt because the railroad soon went into operation on the opposite bank of the Swatara Creek.

== Points of interest ==
Feature	Coordinates	Description
Reading	40°20′08″N 75°55′37″W	City at the eastern terminus
Pine Grove	40°32′54″N 76°23′05″W	Borough at the northern terminus of the feeder canal
Lebanon	40°20′27″N 76°24′41″W	City near the midpoint of the canal
Middletown	40°11′59″N 76°43′52″W	Borough at the western terminus

== See also ==
- Allegheny Portage Railroad
- Delaware and Hudson Canal
- Delaware Canal, aka later: Pennsylvania Canal (Delaware Division)
- List of canals in the United States
- Lehigh Canal
- Pennsylvania Canal System

- Pennsylvania Canal, aka later: Pennsylvania Canal (Eastern Division)
- Pennsylvania Canal (North Branch Division)
- Pennsylvania Canal (Susquehanna Division)
- Pennsylvania Canal (West Branch Division)
- IPennsylvania Canal Guard Lock and Feeder Dam, Raystown Branch
- Pennsylvania Canal Tunnel
- Pennsylvania Canal and Limestone Run Aqueduct

- Schuylkill Canal
- List of National Historic Landmarks in Pennsylvania
