= Union Canal =

Union Canal may refer to:

- Union Canal (Scotland), a canal in Scotland between Edinburgh and Falkirk
- Union Canal (Pennsylvania), a 19th-century canal in Pennsylvania, United States, closed in 1880

== See also ==
- Grand Union Canal, England
