= Pennsylvania Canal (Susquehanna Division) =

Susquehanna Division, Pennsylvania Canal
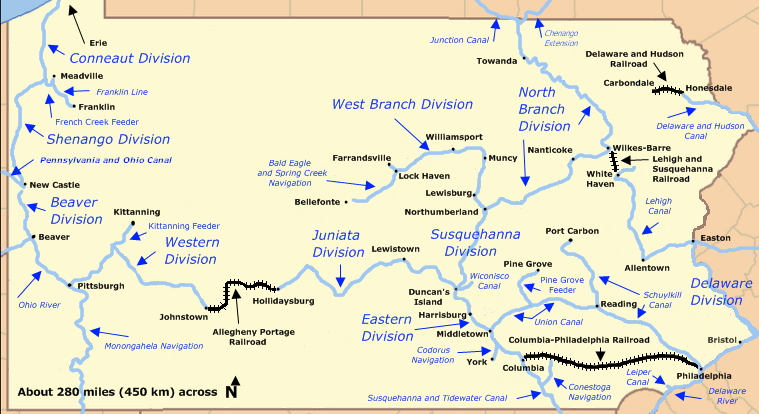
- Map of historic Pennsylvania canals

Specifications
- Locks: 12
- Status: Historic, abandoned

History
- Original owner: Commonwealth of Pennsylvania
- Construction began: 1827
- Date completed: 1831

Geography
- Start point: Northumberland
- End point: Duncan's Island at the mouth of the Juniata River
- Branch: Susquehanna Division
- Branch of: Pennsylvania Canal
- Connects to: North Branch Division, West Branch Division, Juniata Division Canal, Eastern Division Canal, Wiconisco Canal

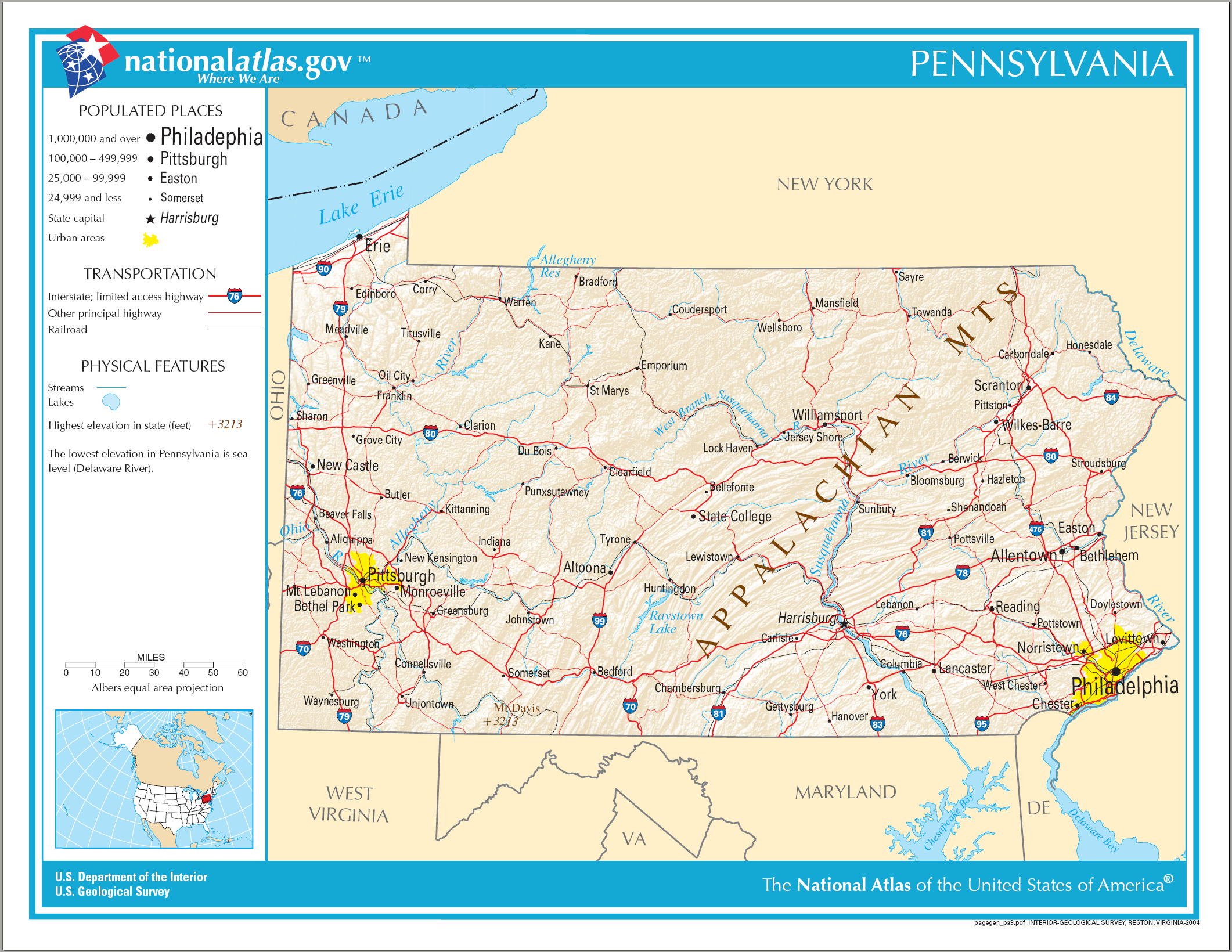
Compare this map with its major roads of today and its terrains with the above canal system map.

The Susquehanna Canal of the Pennsylvania Canal System was funded and authorized as part of the 1826 Main Line of Public Works enabling act, and would later become the Susquehanna Division of the Pennsylvania Canal under the Pennsylvania Canal Commission. Constructed early on in America's brief canal age, (Note: In the eastern United States, the American Industrial Revolution was retarded (then inspired and advanced...) by the need to bring coal to energy starved industries and cities, for by 1800, the society had logged off most nearby stands of timber so by 1810 industrialist were importing coal from Great Britain. Before 1820, early inefficient navigations on the Lehigh and Schuylkill rivers, were developed enough to stimulate commerce and the begin a shift to newly available and clean burning Anthracite coal, which by 1824 due to the efforts of the Lehigh Coal and Navigation Company, had become both a choice and a readily available commodity.) it formed an integral segment of the water focused transportation system which cut Philadelphia-Pittsburgh (pre-railroad) travel time from nearly a month to just four days.

== History and notable features ==
One of the system's navigations, the Susquehanna Canal/Division, created a mule-towed navigable channel 41 miles (66 km) along the west bank of the main stem of the Susquehanna River between a lock terminus near the mouth of the Juniata Tributary River and the canal basin at Northumberland. Meeting the West Branch Canal and the North Branch Canal at Northumberland, it formed a link between the public and private canals upriver and the main east–west Pennsylvania Canal route known as the Main Line of Public Works which was devised to connect Philadelphia to Pittsburgh, southern New York, northern Pennsylvania, and Lake Erie using most of the far reaches of the Susquehanna's tributaries.

The engineering needs of the Susquehanna Canal, were modest in comparison to many contemporary projects, and construction was timed after other more difficult projects in the system were well under way. The Susquehanna Division Canal employed 12 locks overcoming a total of just 86 feet (26 m) in its 41 miles (66 km)s length (Note: Compare just 86 feet (26 m) in its 41 miles (66 km)s length—a similar distance to the Lehigh Canal with 44 locks in 46.5 miles (74.8 km) but having and managing an elevation change of over 600 feet (180 m). (recheck))

It was begun in 1827 and finished in 1831 in time to connect to traffic between the Union Canal and the Allegheny Portage Railroad, which lifted wheeled canal barges up one of the gaps of the Allegheny and over the Allegheny Plateau into the Allegheny-Ohio valleys.

Engineers faced complications at the southern end of the Susquehanna Division Canal, where it met the Juniata Division Canal and the Eastern Division Canal at Duncan's Island. Boats had to cross from one side of the Susquehanna River to the other between either the Susquehanna Division or the Juniata Division on the west side and the Eastern Division on the east side. They solved the problem by building a dam 1,998 feet (609 m) long and 8.5 feet (2.6 m) high between the lower end of Duncan's Island and the east bank of the Susquehanna. This formed a pool across which boats could be pulled from a wooden, two-tier towpath bridge at Clark's Ferry. Two Duncan's Island lift locks raised or lowered the boats traveling between the dam pool and the other canals.

== See also ==
- List of canals in the United States
- Delaware Canal - A canal feeding urban Philadelphia connecting with the Morris and Lehigh Canals at their respective Easton terminals.
- Delaware and Raritan Canal – A New Jersey canal connection to the New York & New Jersey markets shipping primarily coal across the Delaware River. The D&R also shipped Iron Ore from New Jersey up the Lehigh.
- Chesapeake and Delaware Canal – A canal crossing the Delmarva Peninsula in the states of Delaware and Maryland, connecting the Chesapeake Bay with the Delaware Bay.
- Delaware and Hudson Canal - Another early built coal canal as the American canal age began; contemporary with the Lehigh and the Schuylkill navigations.
- Lehigh Canal – A sister canal in the Lehigh Valley that fed coal traffic to the Delaware Canal via a connection in Easton, Pennsylvania. (Note: If the Lehigh Canal hadn't been built, the other Canals reaching the Delaware would likely have had nothing worth the expense of construction to ship—so excepting the Delaware and Hudson Canal and the Schuylkill Canal which were similar ventures to the Lehigh in that both reached deeply into their respective coal fields, effectively right up to the coal sources—their investment would likely never have happened. The principle customer of the Delaware Canal was the coal barges coming down the Lehigh shipped by Lehigh Coal & Navigation Company, which also came to manage the Delaware Canal into the 1960s.)
- Schuylkill Canal - Navigation joining Reading, PA and Philadelphia. (Note: The Schuylkill Canal was long delayed by investors quarreling over the best way to proceed. Disgusted, White and Hazard explored tapping Anthracite via the Lehigh, and ended up incorporating the Lehigh Coal and Navigation Company which spearheaded many technological initiatives.)

== Points of interest ==
Feature	Coordinates	Description
Northumberland	40°53′30″N 76°47′51″W	Town at the northern terminus
Duncan's Island	40°25′02″N 77°00′33″W.	Island at the southern terminus
