= Pennsylvania Canal Tunnel =

Coordinates: 40°26′29″N 79°59′41″W

- Interactive map of Pennsylvania Canal Tunnel

Overview
- Location: Pittsburgh, Pennsylvania
- Status: abandoned
- Waterway: (Pennsylvania) Main Line of Public Works
- Start: Pittsburgh turning basin of the Western Division of the Pennsylvania canal
- End: Monongahela River at Suke's Run

Operation
- Constructed: cut and cover
- Opened: November 10, 1829
- Closed: 1857

Technical
- Design engineer: Meloy and M'Alvey
- Length: 810 ft (250 m)

The Pennsylvania Canal Tunnel was the Pittsburgh terminus of the Pennsylvania Main Line of Public Works, a transportation system that involved other early tunnels.

== History ==
Construction was authorized February 8, 1827, and the tunnel was completed November 10, 1829. The canal crossed the Allegheny River on a covered bridge aqueduct, later replaced by John A. Roebling's first suspension bridge, the Allegheny Aqueduct., the canal traveled underground through most of downtown Pittsburgh, under Grant's Hill, to end in a lock leading to the Monongahela River.

The original plan was to connect with the C&O canal at the Monongahela River, but that canal never reached its expected western end, and the tunnel's main use was to allow overflow from the canal to enter the Monongahela. Only one or two canal boats ever went through the tunnel and lock. The tunnel was made obsolete by the arrival of the Pennsylvania Railroad in 1852.

The canal tunnel was uncovered during the construction of the U.S. Steel Tower in 1967, and later during the construction of the subway system, which used part of the tunnel on the south side.

== Photographs ==
- Photo by Bob Rathke
- Photo at the Pittsburgh Post-Gazette's "The Digs" blog
