= Philadelphia and Columbia Railroad =

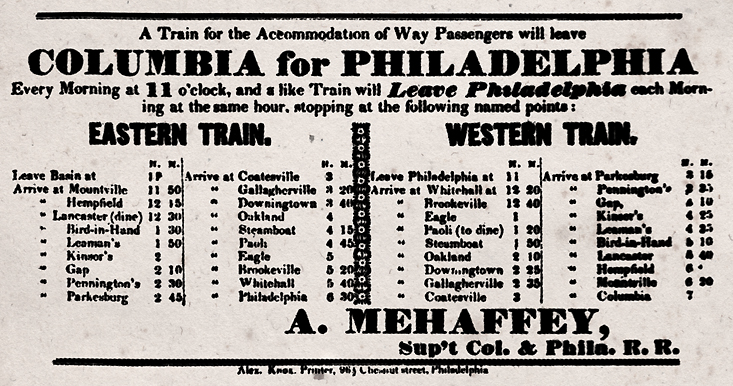
- P&CRR schedule (1837)

Overview
- Headquarters: Philadelphia, Pennsylvania, U.S.
- Reporting mark: P&CRR
- Locale: Philadelphia to Columbia, Pennsylvania, U.S.
- Dates of operation: 1832–1857
- Successor: Pennsylvania Railroad

Technical
- Track gauge: standard
- Length: 82 miles (132.0 km)

Philadelphia and Columbia Railroad (P&CR) (1834) was one of the earliest commercial railroads in the United States, running 82 miles (132 km) from Philadelphia to Columbia, Pennsylvania, it was built by the Pennsylvania Canal Commission in lieu of a canal from Columbia to Philadelphia; in 1857 it became part of the Pennsylvania Railroad. It is currently owned and operated by Amtrak as its electrified Keystone Corridor. The Philadelphia and Columbia Railroad's western terminus was located near the former ferry site known as Wright's Ferry, in the town once of that name, but now Columbia in Lancaster County. There the P&CR met with the Pennsylvania Canal—navigations and improvements on the Susquehanna River east bank approximately 30 miles (48.3 km) south of Harrisburg, Pennsylvania. Most of its right-of-way was obtained by the actions of the Pennsylvania Canal Commission which operated the railroad under the various enabling acts of the Pennsylvania legislature known as the Main Line of Public Works in support of a far sighted plan to link the whole state by canals. With an engineering study reporting back a finding that obtaining sufficient waters to flood the intended 80+ mile canal from Philadelphia to Columbia, the Canal Commission and legislature authorized the railway on the right of way intended for the canal.

In 1857 as one of the properties legally denoted as the Main Line of Public Works, with rapidly improving railroad technology driving rapid changes in capabilities, the Railroad was sold along with most of the Pennsylvania Canal system, to the young Pennsylvania Railroad (PRR) which acquired properties of the Pennsylvania Canal Commission as far west as Pittsburgh and included the Allegheny Portage Railroad with the proviso that the Railroad had to link Philadelphia to Pittsburgh. At the time, the PRR had begun building its famous Horseshoe Curve cutting across several of the streams forming the gaps of the Allegheny. Hence, the Philadelphia and Columbia Railroad became a key integral part of what grew to be the largest railroad in the world.

== Historical background ==
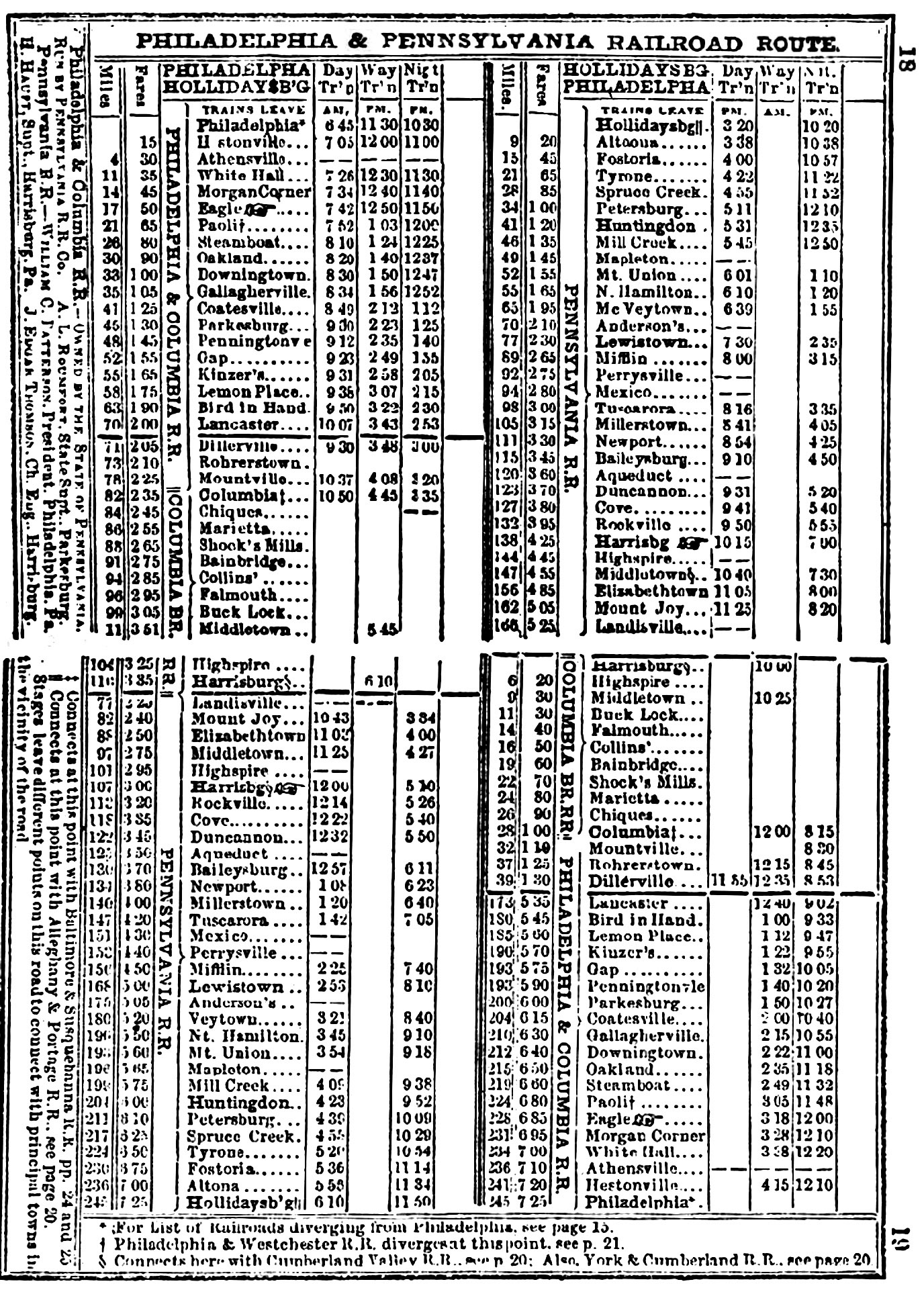
P&CRR schedule from 1851.

Originally planned during the Canal Age at the behest of Philadelphia city fathers to compete with the Erie Canal trade with near-west settlements in the Northwest Territories and expected to be a canal in the late 1820s conception as the easternmost leg of the Pennsylvania Canal System, the branch was to be a continuation of the first funded river improvements and harder-to-construct engineering challenges farther west in less populated rural regions. The canal joining the Delaware and Susquehanna rivers in the initial planning was to run across the most populated expanse of Pennsylvania's Great Valley region (and so was delayed politically in part by local land concerns and the due-process needs of eminent domain). As a canal section, its planning was overtaken by the growth of railroad technology, which by the mid-1830s had demonstrated sufficient promise to adopt the new technology for the easternmost leg of the overall planned transportation system.

Despite the relatively untried and unproven nature of the railroad technologies with the example of the Baltimore and Ohio Railroad project in direct competition—legal capabilities, funding and construction were shifted to a railroad—it was expected to be far faster and cheaper to build above ground and make bridges than it was to dig a deep ditch and provide it with reliable water supplies to enable two way barge traffic.

=== The Pennsylvania Canal ===
The Pennsylvania Canal was conceived in the mid-1820s by Philadelphia merchants inspired by the obvious impact of the Lehigh Canal and the emerging markets of the three decades of steady emigration into the near west, the Ohio Country and Northwest Territory and other lands of the Louisiana Purchase (1803). Built by the Commonwealth of Pennsylvania during a time when America's main coastal cities were vying to become the most important and influential port from the mid-1820s, it was an attempt by business interests to position their own port city to be the principal supplier and beneficiary of the economic boom expected from the new markets and resources, all resulting from the great wave of post revolutionary war immigration taking place westwards to the Ohio Country and Northwest Territory regions in the 19th century. It was also a plan to enable the newly opened Coal Region and the initial mines in the Wyoming Valley to provide clean burning Anthracite to eastern cities that were increasingly having trouble finding heating fuels as eastern forests had become scarce and logged over.

Begun with Navigations construction along the Susquehanna and the West Fork of the Susquehanna with surveys for the best route over the barrier of the northern Allegheny Mountains, the system in time ran from Philadelphia on the Delaware estuary westwards across the great plain of southern Pennsylvania (goal of connecting the Susquehanna to New York City via canals) through Harrisburg and across the state to Pittsburgh and connected with other divisions of the Pennsylvania Canal. It consisted of the following principal sections, moving from east to west:

- Eastern Division Canal: 43 miles (69 km) from Columbia to Duncan's Island at the mouth of the Juniata River.
- Juniata Division Canal: 127 miles (204 km) from Duncan's Island to Hollidaysburg
- Allegheny Portage Railroad: 36 miles (58 km) from Hollidaysburg to Johnstown
- Western Division Canal: 103 miles (166 km) from Johnstown to the terminus in Pittsburgh.

The Pennsylvania Canal opened in 1834 under the Pennsylvania Canal Commission and was sold to the Pennsylvania Railroad on June 25, 1857 for $7,500,000.

The canals reduced travel time between Philadelphia to Pittsburgh from at least 23 days to just four.

=== Philadelphia and Columbia Railroad ===
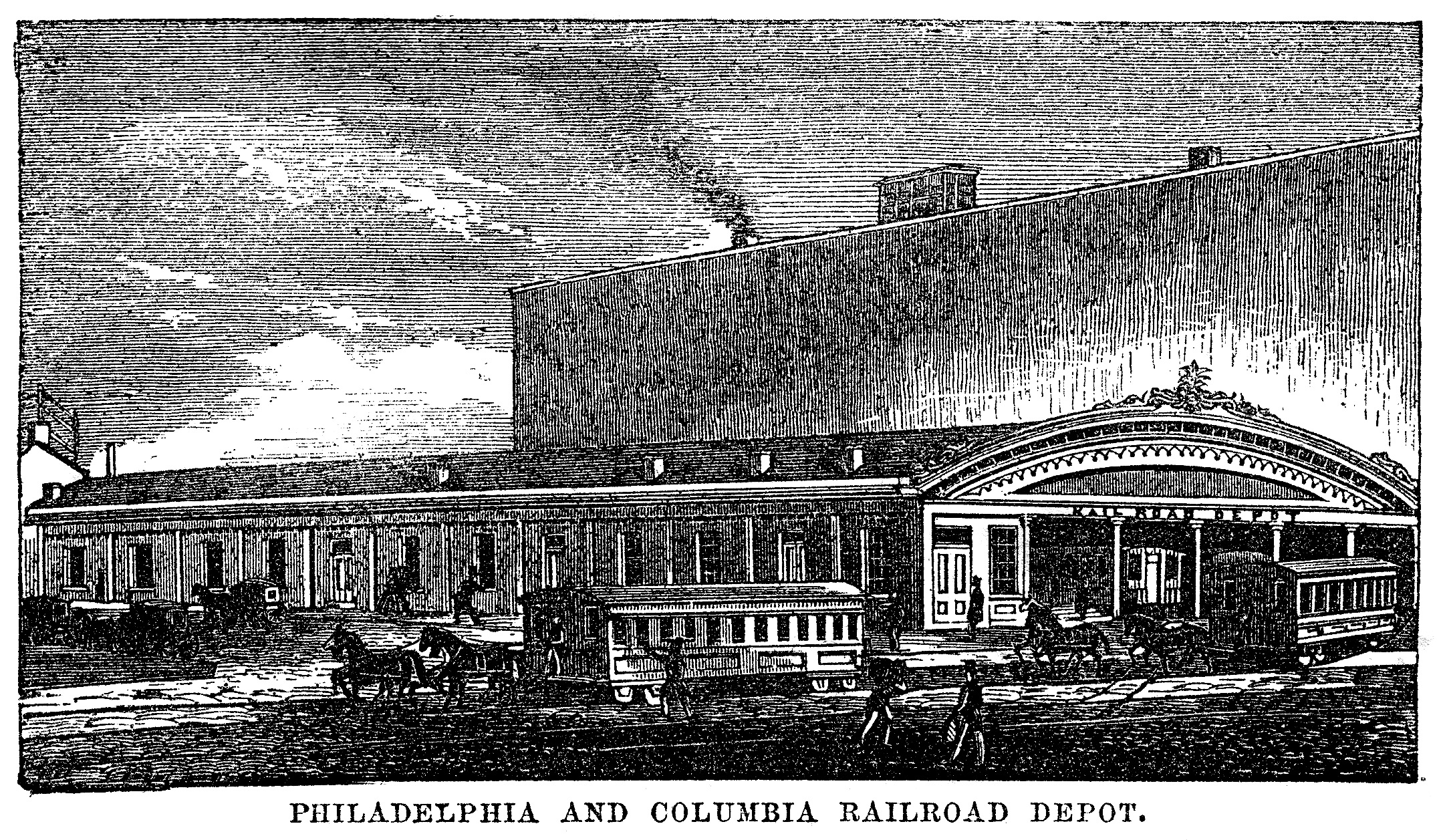
P&CRR Philadelphia depot

The Philadelphia and Columbia Railroad began in Philadelphia at Broad and Vine Streets, ran north on Broad and west on Pennsylvania Avenue (a segment later taken over and submerged/tunneled over by the Reading Railroad), then headed northwest across the Columbia Bridge over the Schuylkill River. Just after crossing the river, it traveled up the Belmont Plane, an inclined plane in the current location of West Fairmount Park, and continued west across the eastern part of the state to Columbia, where the Columbia Plane headed down to the Susquehanna River. At that point, the eastern division of the canal was joined to the railroad, allowing transhipment of traffic heading north along the river and then west.

The Philadelphia & Columbia became operational on September 20, 1832, using flanged-wheeled carriages and wagons dragged by horse power atop iron-capped wooden rails over a 20-mile section between Broad and Vine Streets in Philadelphia and the Green Tree Inn, located between present-day Paoli and Malvern. Built with public funding, the double-track railroad originally operated on a turnpike basis which opened it to all comers, with shippers supplying their own rail carriages, wagons, horse power, and drivers. The railroad soon decided also to offer the option of new-fangled steam locomotives to haul the carriages and wagons assembled into trains, which ran interspersed between horse-hauled traffic. By 1844, horse-hauled movements were banned for through traffic and schedules enforced.

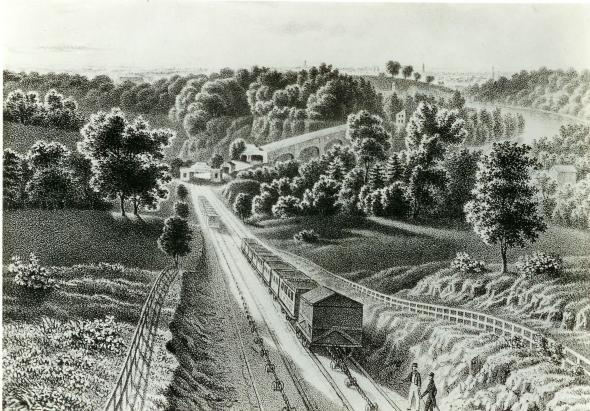
"View of the Inclined Plane, near Philadelphia" (1838).

In order to bypass the Belmont Plane, the original Philadelphia & Columbia RR grade between its eastern terminus and Athensville (renamed Ardmore in 1873) was abandoned and replaced in 1850 with a new alignment roughly following the route of the Philadelphia and Lancaster Turnpike (now Lancaster Avenue) and including the existing West Philadelphia Railroad which the state purchased from the railroad's private owners. This realignment is still in use as the four track "Keystone Corridor" as far as Ardmore (MP 8.5) and is shared by trains of both Amtrak (its current owner) and SEPTA.

=== Northern Liberties and Penn Township Railroad ===
The Northern Liberties and Penn Township Railroad was incorporated in 1829 to build a branch continuing east on Noble Street and Willow Street to the Delaware River. This shortline opened in 1834.

=== Belmont Plane ===
The Belmont Plane ran from the Schuylkill River to the top of the Belmont Plateau. The length of the plane was 2,800 feet and its grade 369 feet to the mile, or one foot rise in 14.3 feet, which was a much steeper grade than the planes on the Mohawk and Hudson Railroad which were one foot in 18, making an ascent of 196 feet in 2,800. Steam-driven cables dragged the railway cars to the top of the hill.

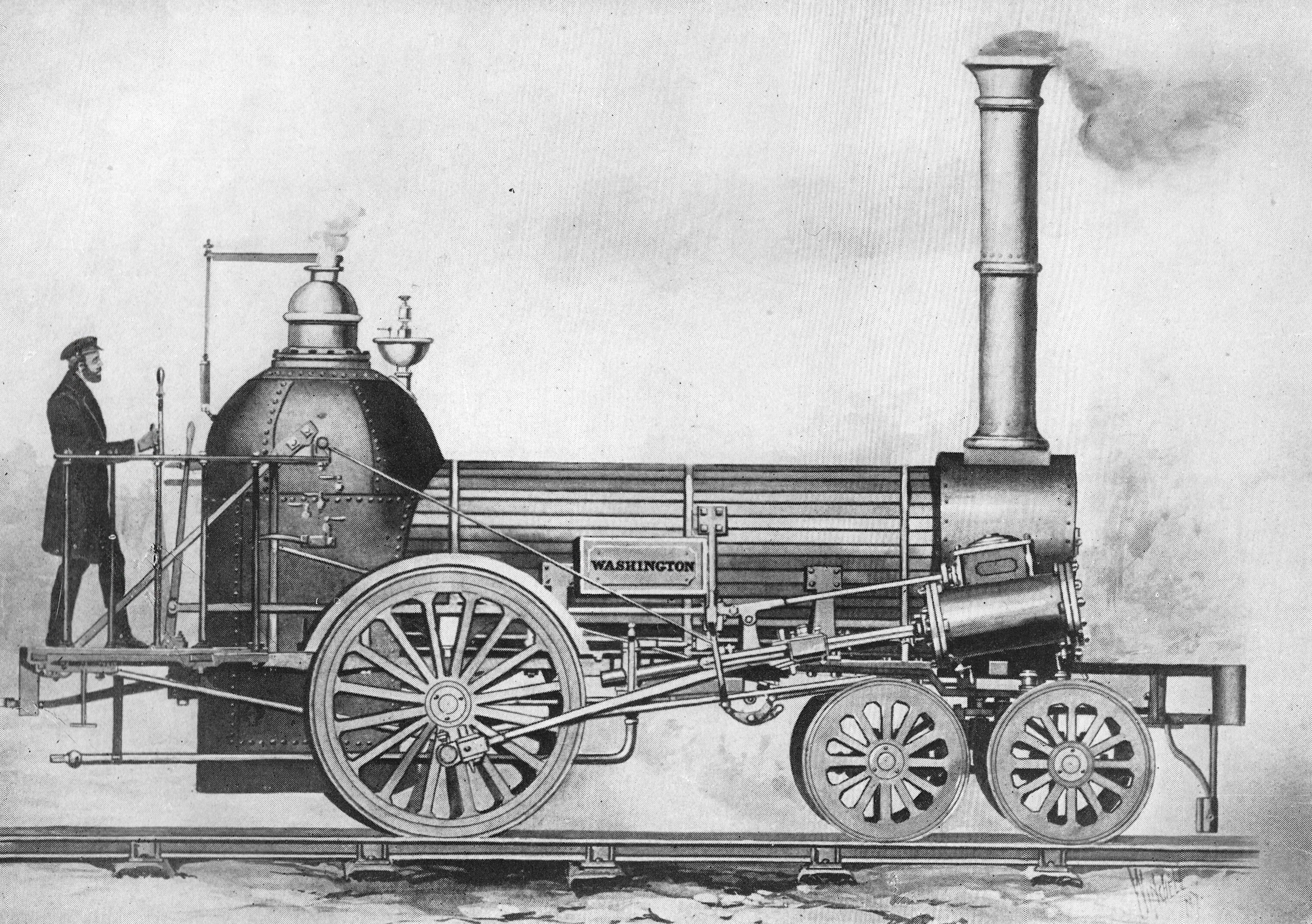
The "Washington" (1836)

On July 10, 1836, the Philadelphia-based William Norris Locomotive Works 4-2-0 steam engine "George Washington" drove up the Plane making it the first locomotive to climb an ascending grade while pulling a load. The weight of the engine with water was 14,930 pounds and the load drawn up the plane, including the tender with coal and water, two passenger cars, and 53 passengers, was 31,270 pounds. The "Washington's" steam pressure was less than eighty pounds to the square inch, and the time to make the run was 2 minutes, 24 seconds representing a speed of 13.25 mph. The dimensions of the "Washington" were: diameter of cylinders, 10 1/4 inches; length of stroke, 17 5/8 inches; number of boiler tubes, 78; outside diameter of tubes, 2 inches; length of tubes, 7 feet; diameter of driving wheels, 4 feet; and diameter of truck wheels, 30 inches. Although the rails at the time of the test were "wet with dew," the locomotive had no rail sander for increasing adhesion of the drivers. So remarkable was this accomplishment that reports in engineering journals doubted its occurrence. Nine days later, the engine repeated the feat in a more formal trial with an even greater load.

=== West Philadelphia and City Railroads ===
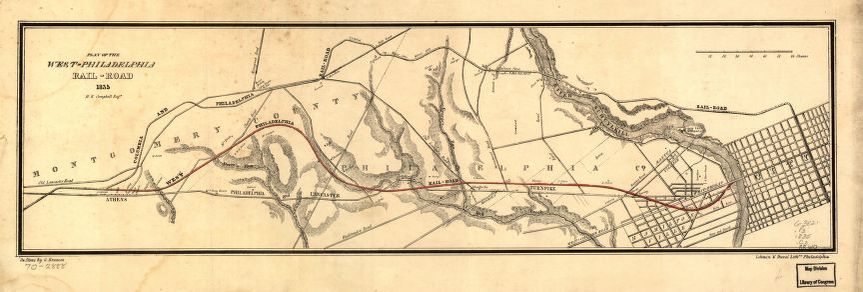
Plan of the West-Philadelphia Railroad

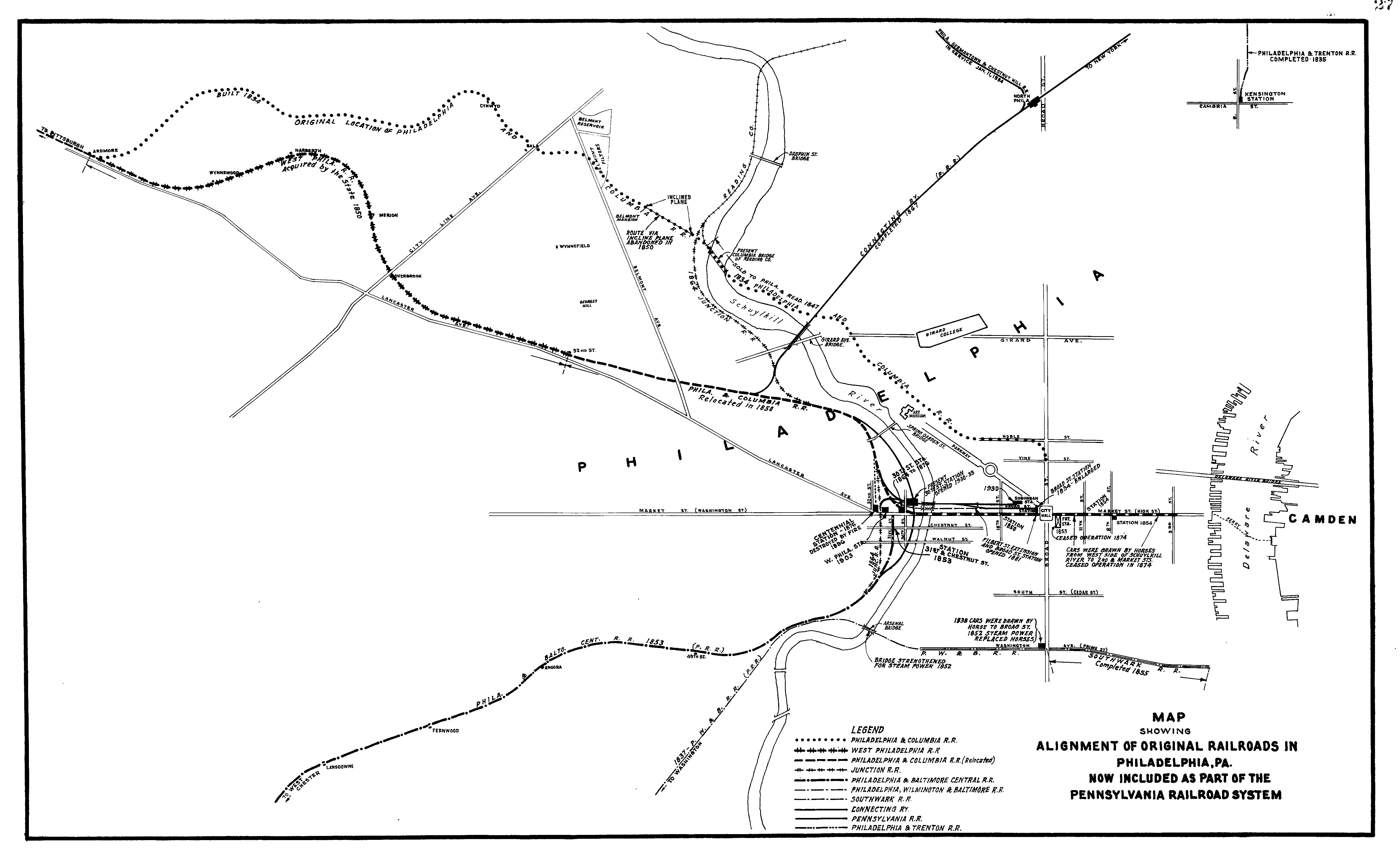
Railroads in Philadelphia that became a part of the PRR.

In 1850, the state bought the remnant of the West Philadelphia Railroad, which had been incorporated in 1835 to bypass the Belmont Plane and failed after completing only the section from 52nd Street west to the main line at Ardmore. The state funded and built the rest of the line from 52nd Street east to downtown, but on a different alignment than the one originally planned; the new line, put into operation October 15, 1850, ended at the west end of the Market Street Bridge, from which the City Railroad continued east. The older planned line, was abandoned and became the route of present-day Montgomery Avenue in Lower Merion Township running from the Schuylkill River up the Belmont Plane to Ardmore.

=== Other sections ===
The Columbia Bridge and line east to Broad and Vine Streets were sold to the Philadelphia and Reading Railroad ('The Reading Railroad') as part of its main line. The Reading also acquired the Northern Liberties and Penn Township Railroad in 1870, giving it access to the Delaware River.

The section of the Pennsylvania Railroad running from Philadelphia west through Montgomery, Delaware, and Chester counties and, by extension, the western suburbs of Philadelphia, is still known as the Main Line.

The Columbia Plane, which lowered railway cars down to the Eastern Division Canal along the Susquehanna River, was bypassed in 1840 by a new track alignment allowed by more modern engines with greater power.

== See also ==
- List of defunct Pennsylvania railroads
- Duffy's Cut
