= Pennsylvania Canal =

Former canal network in Pennsylvania

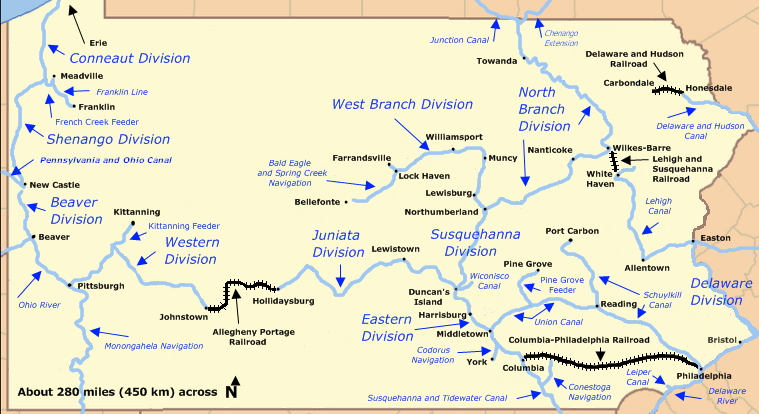
- Map of the Pennsylvania Canal's connecting railroads in Pennsylvania

Specifications
- Status: Abandoned except for historic and recreational segments and navigable rivers

History
- Original owner: Commonwealth of Pennsylvania
- Construction began: 1826
- Date completed: ~1840
- Date closed: ~1900

Geography
- Start point: Philadelphia, Pennsylvania, U.S.
- End point: Pittsburgh, Pennsylvania, U.S.

The Pennsylvania Canal, sometimes known as the Pennsylvania Canal system, was a complex system of transportation infrastructure improvements, including canals, dams, locks, tow paths, aqueducts, and viaducts. The canal was constructed and assembled over several decades beginning in 1824, the year of the first enabling act and budget items. (Note: The political push to create the system was inspired by competition with New York and Baltimore, all three vying to be the premier major port city, and in particular, the continuing construction of the Erie Canal, begun in 1817. The news that construction of the Erie was expected on schedule, in 1825 added fuel to what had become a frenzy. The Erie began operations on October 26, 1825, further inspiring Pennsylvanians to over achieve in the Great Works projects. Portaging over the Alleghenies by 1834 was one result, though the Delaware Canal project was delayed to fund the western infrastructure connecting Allegheny County to the Center and Eastern state.)

Enacted while railroads were in their infancy, the Pennsylvania Canal was designed to create a canal system that was capable of carrying heavy ships carrying bulk goods, connecting the major metropolitan cities of Philadelphia and Pittsburgh, and reaching the new growth markets in the developing Northwest Territory over the Ohio River, now known as the Midwestern United States. (Note: City fathers in New York and Baltimore were undertaking similar actions to build their states' future commerce, resulting in the proposal and company formed to build a canal from Baltimore to the Monongahela and another across Ohio, which spawned the Baltimore and Ohio Railroad. In New York City, the financial and political scheming to get a lock on the emerging Midwest markets would begin with the Erie Canal and work up through the Delaware and Hudson Canal and the New York Central Railroad.)

The Pennsylvania Canal was updated in 1837 to reflect the experience of twelve years of toddler-railways, (Note: Several key early railroads were added later in 1837 after word of early British successes reached the United states, and the first group of rail lines begun in the US (1826–1828) proved their worth.) The term was also applied to railroads and new canals to be added to the state transportation system. The Main Line of Public Works and the Pennsylvania Canal system topped 2,100 feet (640 m) in elevation by erecting the Allegheny Portage Railroad, which used a system of five inclines and five planes on each side of the Eastern Continental Divide at Cresson Pass in Cambria County to actually haul wheeled flat cars, which had halved canal boats placed on them, up and over the Allegheny Front and connect Pittsburgh to the Susquehanna River. When finished in 1834, the trip from Philadelphia to Pittsburgh could be made in three to five days, weather conditions depending.

== Background ==
In the fifty years before 1830, the new west was settled and steadily growing as people poured westwards along the various Emigrant Trails into the Midwest to destinations on a million new farms and towns throughout the watershed of the Mississippi Valley towards the lands organized in the Northwest Territory.

The goal of the enabling acts was to enhance commerce and lower transportation costs between east and west, better joining the trans-Allegheny region to the eastern seaboard; this was a commercially motivated act with an eye towards servicing the growing markets of the new fast growing western settlements (Midwest) to the manufactories of the East.

Provision was made in the later legislation to tie in and even extend privately built canals such as the Lehigh Canal, not technically part of the Pennsylvania Canal system, and link them and the state's infant railroads to the public system and add to its value. The canal linking Philadelphia to the Susquehanna River, the proposed Pennsylvania Canal from Philadelphia to the Wright's Ferry landing in Columbia, Pennsylvania, was overtaken by technological events. Instead of pouring money into building a ditch, permission was sought by the investors to use its 82-mile (132 km) right of way to replace it in the Main Line of Public Works scheme by a railway, a new developing technology, which resulted in the Philadelphia and Columbia Railroad (1834).

Since they were built above ground, railways were easier and cheaper to build, since no ditches needed to be dug with human muscle power, nor did they require feed waters to be located and aqueducts built to provide them. The plan also included a visionary scheme to build a ramp system which would roll canal boats over the Allegheny Mountains at an elevation over 2,100 feet (640 m) through the broad uneven saddle of Cresson Pass.

Though most of the canals no longer have any function, some segments retain value as historic and recreational sites. Both the Delaware Canal and the lower Lehigh Canal were kept busy into the tough financial years of the Great Depression.

The right of way authorized for the Upper Lehigh Canal became an extension of the Lehigh and Susquehanna Railroad (LH&S), which the 1837 revised act had established to connect the Wyoming Valley to the Delaware River navigations; the railway would eventually parallel the entire Lehigh Canal operated by its parent LHC&N. The route from Philadelphia to Wilkes-Barre over the Lehigh and LH&S or eventual LH&S cut over 100 miles (160 km) off the trip, including a similar distance saving Philadelphia to Pittsburgh via Pitston Landing's canal docks.

The first three tunnels of any kind in the US were built in support of the Allegheny Portage Railway, and all of them were converted to railroad tunnels.

== History ==
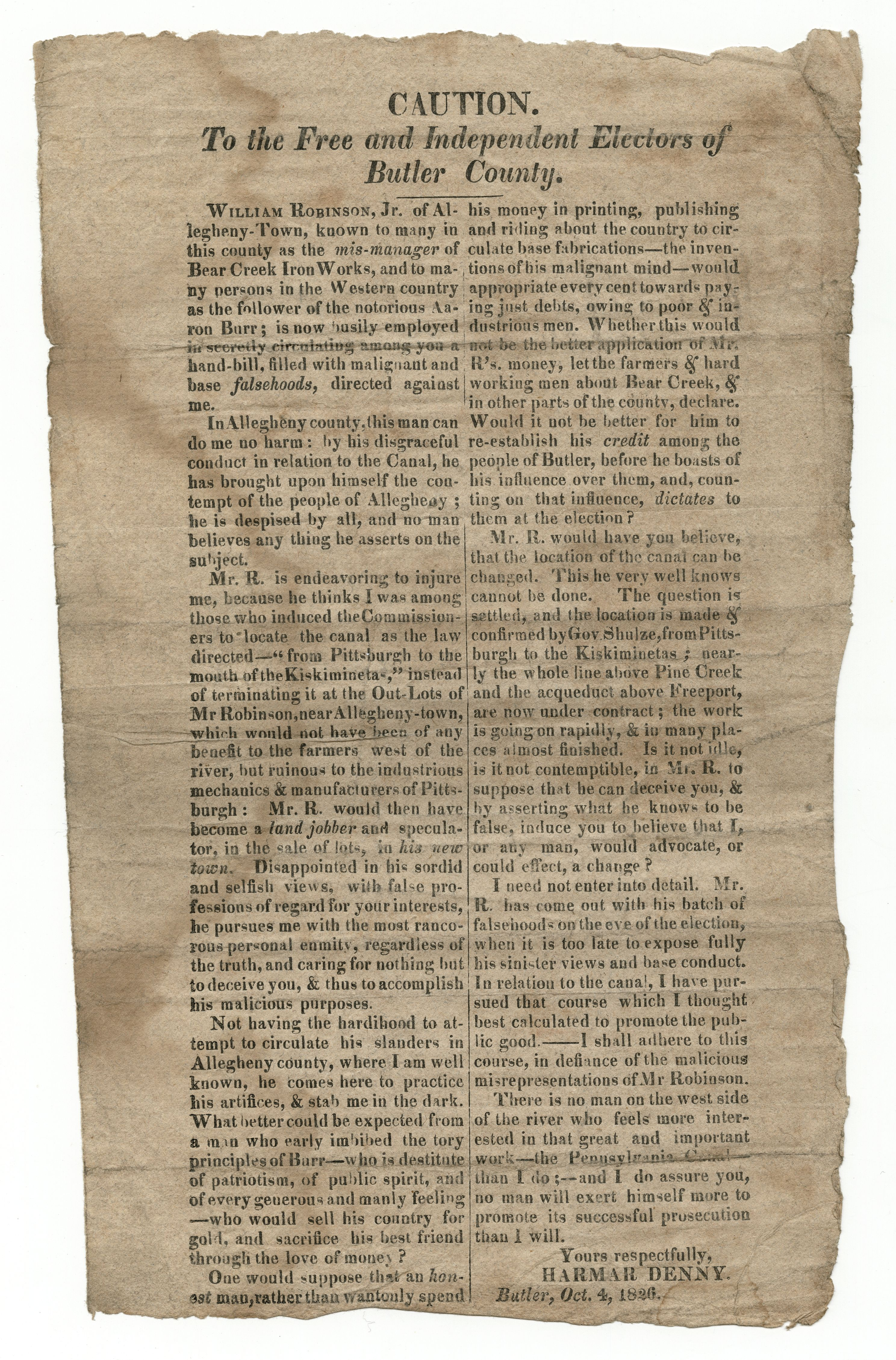
An October 4, 1826 letter by Harmar Denny, a Pennsylvania State Representative, that discusses William Robinson Jr.'s "disgraceful conduct" in the debate over the location of the Pennsylvania Canal's terminal

=== 18th century ===
The canal era began in Pennsylvania in 1797 with the Conewago Canal, which carried riverboats around Conewago Falls on the Susquehanna River near York Haven.

=== 19th century ===
Spurred by construction of the Erie Canal (constructed between 1817 and 1825) and the perceived competitive advantage it would give New York state in moving people and materials to and from the interior of the continent, Pennsylvanians built hundreds of miles of canals during the early 19th century. These included the privately funded Lehigh Canal in 1818, which improved water transport on the lower Lehigh River from Jim Thorpe to Easton at the confluence with the Delaware River via Allentown and Bethlehem.

The Lehigh Canal enabled the first regular reliable supplies of anthracite coal to reach eastern manufactories and two canals built later by Pennsylvania stock companies, the Schuylkill Canal, which started in Philadelphia and ended in Port Carbon, and the Union Canal, which started in Reading and ended in Middletown.

By 1834, the Main Line of Public Works, a system of interlocking canals, railways, and inclined planes, was hauling passengers and freight up to 391 miles (629 km) between Philadelphia and Pittsburgh. Though not all in concurrent operation, the total length of the canals built in Pennsylvania eventually reached 1,243 miles (2,000 km).

By 1840, work had been completed not only on the Main Line of Public Works but on many other lines, officially called "divisions". The Main Line consisted of the Eastern Division, the Juniata Division, the Western Division, the Philadelphia and Columbia Railroad, and the Allegheny Portage Railroad. North–south divisions operated along the Delaware River in the east, the Susquehanna River in the middle of the state, and the Beaver River in the west. A few additions were completed after 1840.

By 1850, steam engine technology had advanced to having the ability to produce locomotives with sufficient power to move freight, including bulk goods such as coal and grain, so railroads had already begun displacing canals as the preferred method of long-distance transportation, as they also offered speed.

In 1852, the Pennsylvania Railroad (PRR) began offering rail service from Philadelphia to Pittsburgh, and in 1857, it bought the Main Line Canal from the state.

In 1859, all canals owned by the Commonwealth of Pennsylvania were sold. The PRR formed the Pennsylvania Canal Company in 1867 and continued to use canals to haul freight. The canal business, however, declined steadily in the last quarter of the 19th century, and most Pennsylvania canals no longer functioned after 1900.

== State built ==
The state funded the following canals in Pennsylvania. For interstate canals, the listed mileage is for the Pennsylvania portion only.

=== Pennsylvania Main Line Canal ===
- Eastern Division-Pennsylvania Canal, Columbia to Clarks Ferry, 43 miles (69 km)
- Juniata Division-Pennsylvania Canal, Juniata Aqueduct to Hollidaysburg, 127 miles (204 km)
- Western Division-Pennsylvania Canal, Johnstown to Pittsburgh, 104 miles (167 km)
- Allegheny Outlet-Pennsylvania Canal, Western Division to Allegheny River, 0.75 miles (1.21 km)
- Kittanning Feeder, Kittanning to Western Division, 14 miles (23 km)

=== Susquehanna network ===
These canals are all connected directly to branches of the Susquehanna River, and most are technically navigations.

- Pennsylvania Canal (Susquehanna Division), Clarks Ferry to Northumberland, 41 miles (66 km)
- Pennsylvania Canal (West Branch Division), Northumberland to Farrandsville, 73 miles (117 km)
- Pennsylvania Canal (North Branch Division), Northumberland to New York State line, 169 miles (272 km)
- Wiconisco Canal, Clarks Ferry to Millersburg, 12 miles (19 km)
- Lewisburg Cut, West Branch Division to Lewisburg, 0.75 miles (1.21 km)
- Bald Eagle Cut, West Branch Division through Lock Haven to Bald Eagle Creek, 4 miles (6 km)

=== Beaver and Erie ===
- Beaver Division, Ohio River at Beaver to Pulaski, 31 miles (50 km)
- Shenango Division, Pulaski to Conneaut Lake, 61 miles (98 km)
- Conneaut Division, Conneaut to Erie, 46 miles (74 km)
- French Creek Feeder, Meadville to Conneaut Lake, 25 miles (40 km)
- Franklin Line, French Creek Feeder to Franklin, 22 miles (35 km)

=== Delaware ===
- Delaware Division, Easton to Bristol, 60 miles (97 km)

== Privately built ==
Private entities, including foreign investors, funded the following canals in Pennsylvania. For interstate canals, the listed mileage is for the Pennsylvania portion only.

- Bald Eagle and Spring Creek Navigation Canal, Bellefonte to Bald Eagle Cut, 22 miles (35 km)
- Codorus Navigation, York to Susquehanna River, 11 miles (18 km)
- Conestoga Navigation, Lancaster to Susquehanna River, 18 miles (29 km)
- Conewago Canal, around Conewago Falls on Susquehanna, 1.25 miles (2.01 km)
- Delaware and Hudson Canal, Honesdale to Rondout, New York, 25 miles (40 km)
- Lehigh Canal, White Haven to Easton, Grand Canal 72 miles (116 km) (1848-1862) The Lehigh was built in two stages, the lower canal running 46.2 miles (74.4 km) built in 1818-1820 connected the coal fields from the slack water pool at Jim Thorpe to Easton on the Delaware River, where it provided coal to the Delaware & Raritan Canal to New York City, Princeton, and Trenton in New Jersey via the Delaware Canal to Philadelphia, and by conveyance on the Delaware River to oceanic shipping vessels. The 1837 revision of the Main Line of Public Works authorized the Lehigh Coal and Navigation Company to build the 25.2 miles (40.6 km) upper canal division from White Haven to the Lehigh Gorge and the docks and railroads at Mauch Chunk, and build railroads from the Pennsylvania Canal docks on the Susquehanna River at Pittston to Mountain Top via the Ashley Planes cable railway, which roseg 1,100 feet (340 m) from Ashley in 1.7 miles (2,700 m). At the top trains descended by gravity to the new extended canal head at White Haven and returned by locomotive propulsion.
- Junction Canal, Athens to Elmira, New York, 3.25 miles (5.23 km)
- Leiper Canal, Crum Creek near Chester, Pennsylvania, several miles
- Monongahela Navigation Company
- Muncy Cut, Muncy to West Branch Susquehanna, 0.75 miles (1.21 km)
- Pennsylvania and Ohio Canal, New Castle to Akron, Ohio, 18 miles (29 km)
- Pine Grove Feeder, Union Canal to Pine Grove, 22 miles (35 km)
- Sandy and Beaver Canal, Glasgow to Bolivar, Ohio, 0.75 miles (1.21 km)
- Schuylkill Canal, Port Carbon to Philadelphia, 108 miles (174 km)
- Susquehanna and Tidewater Canal, Columbia to Havre de Grace, Maryland, 30 miles (48 km)
- Union Canal, Reading to Middletown, 78 miles (126 km) successor to the Schuylkill and Susquehanna Navigation Company

== Parks, monuments, historic places ==
Several canal segments or other canal infrastructure in Pennsylvania are listed on the National Register of Historic Places. One complete canal, the Delaware Canal, is the main feature of Delaware Canal State Park (formerly Theodore Roosevelt State Park) between Bristol and Easton. It is continuously intact for its full length of 60 miles (97 km).

Other Pennsylvania canal infrastructure on the National Register includes the following:

- Allegheny Portage Railroad, from Johnstown to Hollidaysburg, which is both a National Historic Site and a National Historic Landmark. The portage railroad begins where the canal ends in Hollidaysburg. This site is now the home of the Canal Basin Park.
- D & H Canal Company office, scenic drive, northwest side of Lackawaxen Township
- Juniata Division, guard lock and feeder dam, Raystown Branch, Juniata River, 2.5 miles (4.0 km) east of Huntingdon, south of U.S. Route 22, near Springfield, Pennsylvania
- Juniata Division, 1.5 miles (2.4 km) of canal between the Pennsylvania Railroad main line and the Juniata River in Granville Township
- Leesport Lock House, a Lockhouse on the Schuylkill Canal in Leesport
- Lehigh Canal, Allentown to Hopeville section, Lehigh River near Bethlehem
- Lehigh Canal, Carbon County section along Lehigh River, Weissport and vicinity
- Lehigh Canal, Glendon and Abbott Street Industrial Sites, Lehigh River from Hopeville to confluence of Lehigh and Delaware Rivers near Easton
- Lehigh Canal, Lehigh Gap to South Walnutport boundary
- Lehigh Canal, Walnutport to Allentown section, Allentown and vicinity
- Schuylkill Navigation Canal, Oakes Reach section, north and east bank of Schuylkill River from Pennsylvania Route 113 to Lock 61
- Union Canal Tunnel, west of Lebanon off Pennsylvania Route 72
- West Branch Division, canal and Limestone Run aqueduct, Milton
- Western Division, canal north of Torrance in Westmoreland County
- Western Division, canal along the Conemaugh River, near Robinson

== See also ==
- List of canals in the United States
- National Canal Museum in Easton, Pennsylvania
