= Allegheny Aqueduct (Pittsburgh) =

- Coordinates: 40°26′54″N 79°59′46″W
- Carries: Pennsylvania Canal
- Crosses: Allegheny River
- Locale: Pittsburgh
- Other name(s): Allegheny Aqueduct Bridge

Characteristics
- Design: suspension bridge
- Material: Wood, charcoal iron wire rope
- No. of spans: 7 of 162 feet each

History
- Designer: John A. Roebling
- Construction start: 1844
- Construction end: 1845
- Closed: 1861

The Allegheny Aqueduct was John A. Roebling's first wire cable suspension bridge. It was built in 1844 near the later Fort Wayne Railroad Bridge as a replacement for a wooden covered bridge aqueduct over the Allegheny River in Pittsburgh, part of the Pennsylvania Canal.
