= Pennsylvania Canal and Limestone Run Aqueduct =

- U.S. National Register of Historic Places
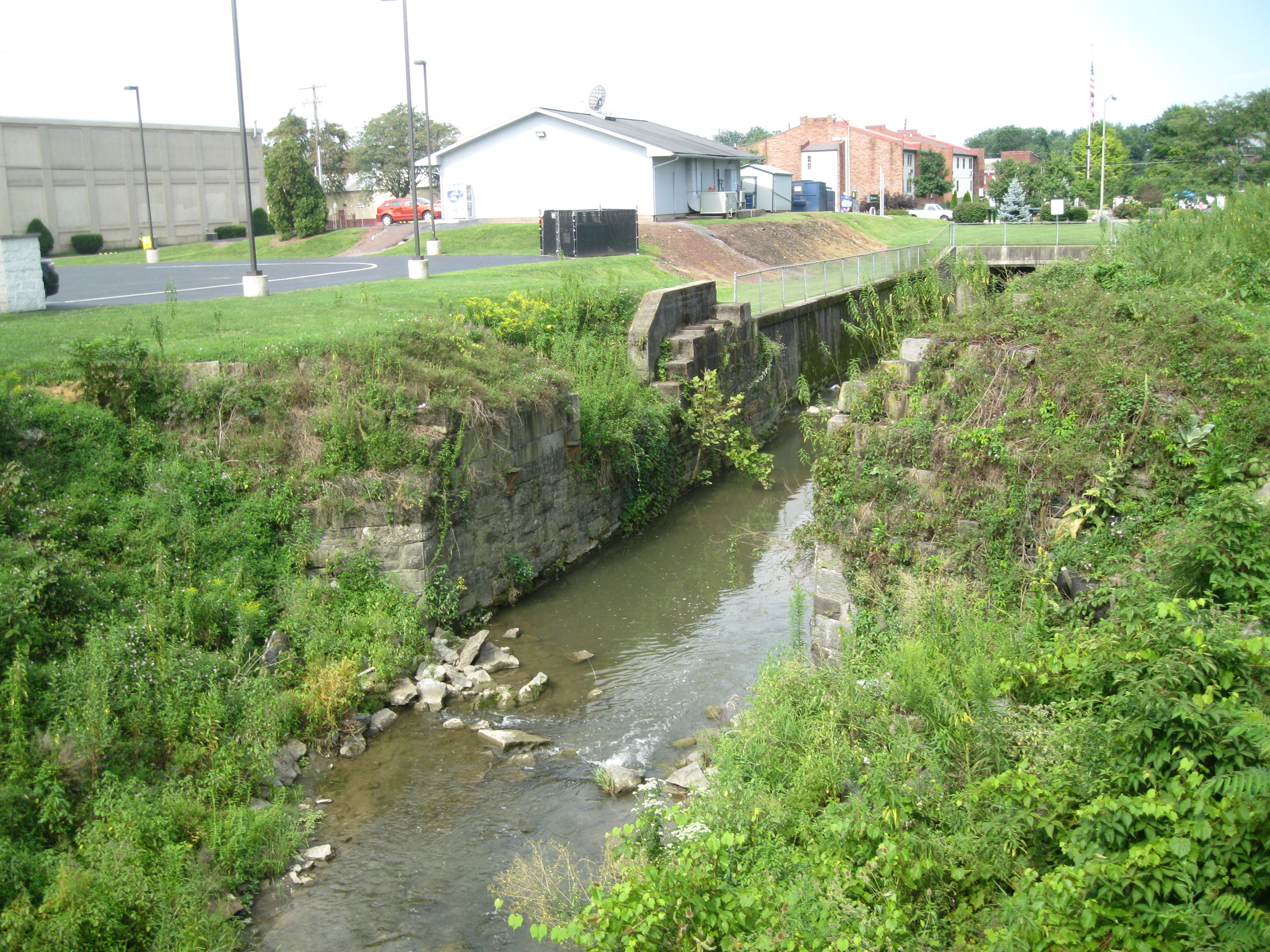
- Limestone Run Aqueduct ruins in August 2013

- Location within Pennsylvania Location within the United States
- Location: Bounded by Broadway, Filbert St., Limestone Run and Bound Ave., Milton, Pennsylvania
- Coordinates: 41°01′07″N 76°51′13″W
- Area: 1.7 acres (0.69 ha)
- Built: 1829-1830
- Built by: Foller & Levan; Et al.
- Architect: Rawle, Francis W.
- NRHP reference No.: 78002438
- Added to NRHP: December 19, 1978

The Pennsylvania Canal and Limestone Run Aqueduct is an historic aqueduct complex in Milton, Northumberland County, Pennsylvania, United States.

It was added to the National Register of Historic Places in 1978.

== History and architectural features ==
The Milton Section was built between 1829 and 1830, as part of the West Branch Division of the Pennsylvania Canal. It encompasses twenty contributing structures and two contributing sites, and consists of the Limestone Run Aqueduct, canal bed, and towpath. The aqueduct consists of a single span built of stone and wood, 20-foot-long (6.1 m) and a width of 75-foot (23 m).

== Gallery ==
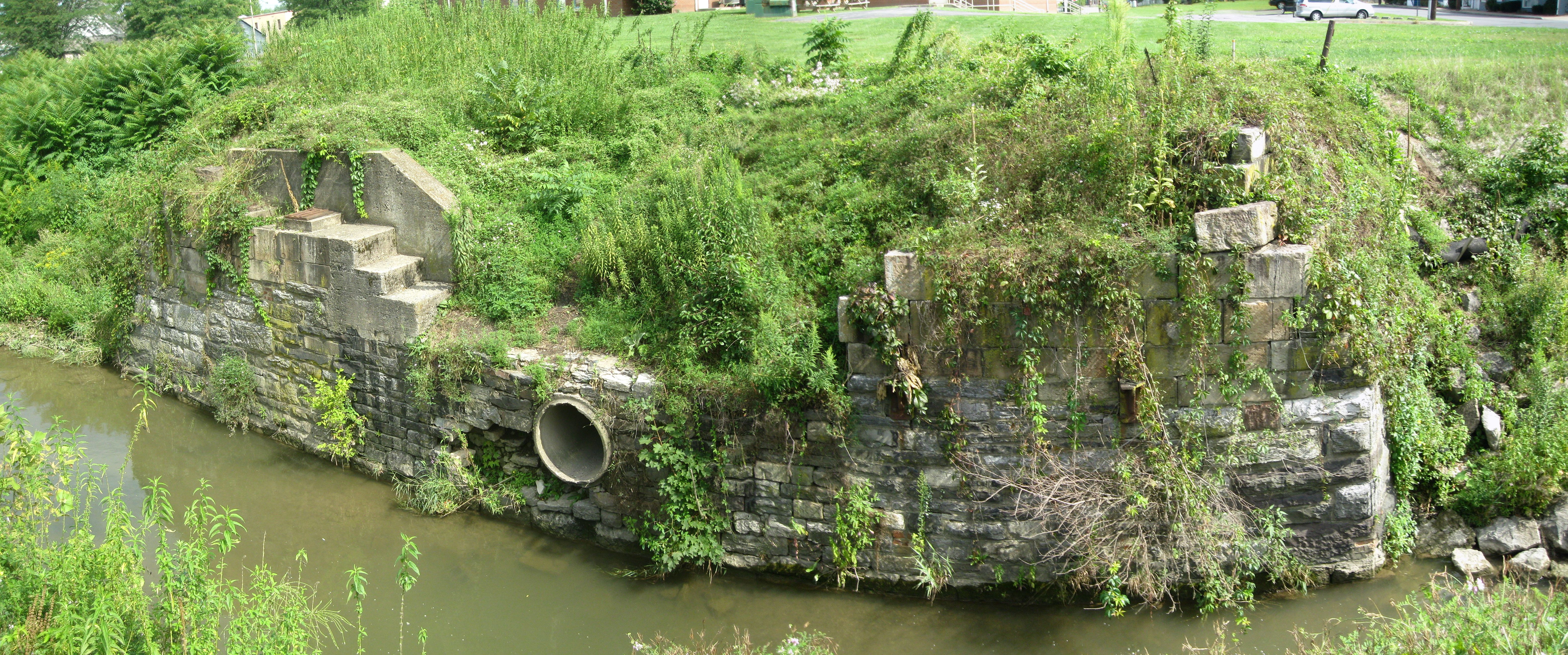
Panoramic view of the north side of the aqueduct ruins.
