= Pennsylvania Canal Guard Lock and Feeder Dam, Raystown Branch =

- U.S. National Register of Historic Places
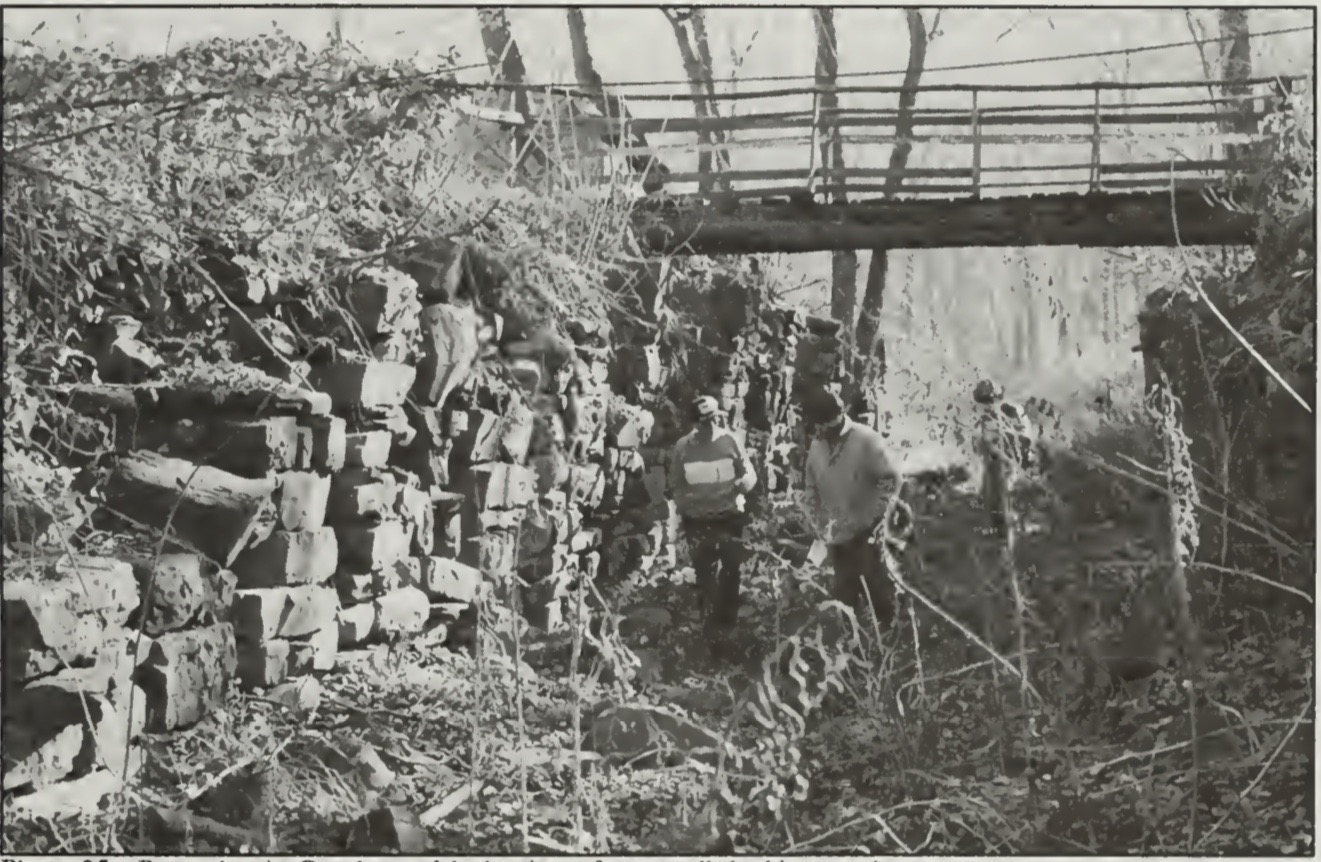
- HABS/HAER photo c. 1991

- Location within Pennsylvania Location within the United States
- Location: 2.5 mi. E of Huntingdon, S of US 22 on the Juniata River, Henderson Township, Pennsylvania
- Coordinates: 40°26′59″N 77°58′09″W
- Area: 2 acres (0.81 ha)
- Built: 1831
- Built by: Pennsylvania Canal; et al.
- MPS: Industrial Resources of Huntingdon County, 1780--1939 MPS
- NRHP reference No.: 90000394
- Added to NRHP: March 20, 1990

The Pennsylvania Canal Guard Lock and Feeder Dam, Raystown Branch, also known as the Raystown Branch Feeder Canal, is an historic canal structure in Henderson Township in Huntingdon County, Pennsylvania, United States. The property includes the remains of a guard lock and feeder dam.

It was listed on the National Register of Historic Places in 1990.

== History and architectural features ==
The guard lock was built in 1831, and the remains consist of two ninety-foot-long parallel walls that were eight feet high and fifteen feet apart. The remains of the feeder dam consist of stone and earth remnants of a dam that once stretched across the Juniata River. The lock and dam were built to allow boats built on Standing Stone Creek to enter the Pennsylvania Canal, and were abandoned with the remainder of the Pennsylvania Canal during the 1870s.
