= History of anthracite coal mining in Pennsylvania =

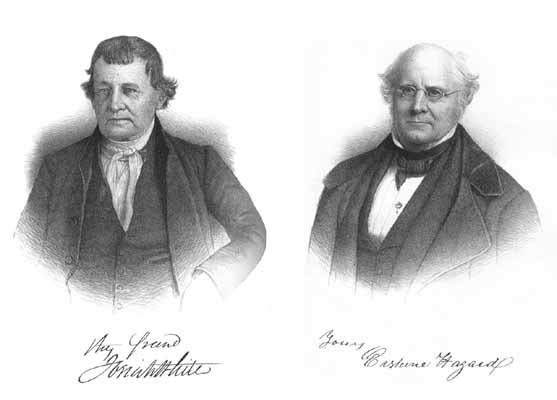
Josiah White and Erskine Hazard, founding partners of the Lehigh Coal Company, the Lehigh Navigation Company, the Lehigh Coal & Navigation Company, the Lehigh Canal, the Summit Hill & Mauch Chunk Railroad, Ashley Planes, and the Lehigh & Susquehanna Railroad. The fuel from their works and their iron products bootstrapped the industrial revolution in the northeast seacoast population centers from Boston to Norfolk, Virginia.

There are two types of coal found in Pennsylvania: anthracite, the hard coal found in Northeastern Pennsylvania below the Allegheny Ridge southwest to Harrisburg, and bituminous, the soft coal found west of the Allegheny Front escarpment). Anthracite coal is a natural mineral with a high carbon and energy content that gives off light and heat produced energy when burned, making it useful as a fuel. It was possibly first used in Pennsylvania as a fuel in 1769, but its history begins with a documented discovery near Summit Hill and the founding of the Lehigh Coal Mine Company in 1792 to periodically send expeditions to the wilderness atop Pisgah Ridge to mine the deposits, mostly with notable lack of great success, over the next 22 years.

The owners of this company were absentee managers who were reliant on teams of workers sent under a foreman to fell timber to build so called 'arks' (high-sided punts), then mine coal around nine miles in present-day Summit Hill, Pennsylvania from the right bank of the Lehigh River terminus at Mauch Chunk), then trek with mule loads to fill the boats for the trip down the rapid-strewn Lehigh River, and then more than 60 miles (97 km) to the Lehigh Valley docks on the unimproved, often log-choked river. (Note: In 1823 White and Hazard offered to pay for improved navigations over the distance of the Delaware and in 1822–23 they had tested four large canal locks suitable for Steam tugs (such were in wide use by then) to pull Schooners to navigate up the river to Easton, where they would build matching 300 feet (91 m) locks allowing sea going ships access to Mauch Chunk. Timber interests wanted the Delaware 'dam free' so they could continue rafting floats of logs down the river freely. So pressured, the Pennsylvania Legislature declined, and in 1824 belatedly added the Delaware Canal to their long list of major civil engineering water transportation projects needing funded in the packaged enabling legislation for the Main Line of Public Works—the ambitious creation of a statewide system of canals (finally passed in 1826) as a belated response to New York's interests success in establishing the Erie Canal, a trans-Allegheny shipping channel that also tied into the Great Lakes. The Lehigh Coal & Navigation was paying steeply every year, sending sacrificial arks down and deforesting the steep sided flanking mountains in ever growing amounts that ended with denuded banks covering as much as 400 acres (160 ha) a year.)

Around 1790, the nation's first energy crisis became evident even in smaller towns: the forests needed for charcoal for smelting and other manufacturing, and stands of wood for heating fire wood were quickly vanishing, farther and farther from population centers. Transport of wood or an alternative fuel became very important to people, and bituminous was cheaper to import from England than 'chancy, unreliable' anthracite was to buy in Philadelphia. Suffering through British navy blockades during the war, industrialist Josiah White set his mill supervisors the task of experimenting with anthracite to get to ignite (Note: As the Museum book 'The Delaware and Lehigh Canals' relates, the worker, upset by lack of success, slammed the furnace door closed in frustration and headed home for the day. About a half hour later, other employees observed in the absence of cooling and with, by luck, a suitable bottom draft, the furnace was by then glowing white hot.) and burn in a useful way. Draft control and reflected heat proved to be the key to using anthracite for all processes. With sufficient heat, which excess air flow retards and cools, the fuel ignited and burned well. Soon other measures were found that within a decade made it the preferred home heating fuel in all the developed and settled East coast.

In 1813, the first mining actually begun at Beaver Meadows, however, because of the various struggles getting it the 130 miles (210 km) to Philadelphia and because it is far more difficult to ignite anthracite with its sporadic and unreliable supply, it did not come to be generally used regularly until after the War of 1812. Industrialists Hazard and White showed the way. The developments of the canal and then railroad system made transporting the anthracite exponentially easier, and by the 1860s anthracite coal was regularly supplying urban centers like Philadelphia and New York City and was helping to fuel the American Industrial Revolution.

== Geology ==
Anthracite and bituminous coal were formed in the eastern and western regions of Pennsylvania in the Carboniferous Geological Period. The Pennsylvania Anthracite Region is in the Valley and Ridge Province of the Appalachian Mountains, with the coal located in the folded and faulted terrain of the Province.

The anthracite fields are maintained in synclinal basins that are surrounded by sandstone ridges, which help to "protect" the anthracite.

There are four different anthracite coalfields in Pennsylvania, all located on the eastern side of the state. The Northern field is located predominantly in the Luzerne, Lackawanna, Susquehanna and Wayne Counties; the Western Middle field in Northumberland, Columbia, and Schuylkill Counties; the Eastern Middle field mainly in Luzerne County but extending into Schuylkill, Carbon, and Columbia Counties; the Southern field in Carbon, Schuylkill, Lebanon, and Dauphin Counties.

Anthracite differs from bituminous in usage in that it has better heat quality and fewer disadvantageous by-products, but it has higher carbon content and is therefore harder to ignite and requires a grate to separate the ashes from the burning coal.

== History ==
=== 17th century ===
One of the earliest mentions that coal might be found in the Pennsylvania area dates back to 1698, when Gabriel Thomas wrote an account dedicated to William Penn. He notes the possibility of coal because the running water had the same coloring as the water in the coalmines in Wales.

=== 18th century ===
The earliest record of the presence of coal in Pennsylvania is a map the Indian trader, John Pattin, made in 1753, although it is possible he did not detect the coal first hand, but rather heard about it from other traders. In 1754, George Washington led an expedition across the Allegheny Mountains, and his second-in-command wrote a letter detailing an abundance of natural luxuries, including coal, in Western Pennsylvania.

The earliest known Pennsylvania coal mine was a bituminous coal mine, recorded on the 1761 "Plan of Fort Pitts and Parts Adjacent" map. This mine was located in Fort Pitt near the top of Coal Hill, within the area of present day Downtown Pittsburgh.

Anthracite coal was first found in 1762. The first use of which was in 1769 by Obadiah Gore and his brother in their blacksmith shop in Wilkes-Barre. However, coal usage was generally restricted to local consumption needs until the industry began to expand at the turn of the 19th century.

In 1792, Lehigh Coal Mine Company started the first attempt at commercializing Pennsylvania's anthracite coal. The company was founded after German immigrant and hunter Philip Ginder (Ginter) discovered beds of the anthracite "stone coal" in 1791 on Pisgah Mountain near Summit Hill.

A wealthy landowner, Jacob Weiss, and other Philadelphia businessmen provided the capital to form the Lehigh Coal Mine Company. The company had a slow start because of the difficulty in igniting anthracite coal and the inability to transfer the coal to urban markets.

=== 19th century ===
In 1807, Brothers Abijah and John Smith were the first to successfully transport hard coal when they moved 50 tons on an ark down the Susquehanna River to Columbia.

In 1808, Judge Jesse Fell of Wilkes-Barre discovered a solution to ignite anthracite with the usage of an iron grate that allowed the coal to light and burn easier. Demand for the anthracite coal increased slightly.

In 1810, 350 tons of anthracite was mined in Pennsylvania. The use of anthracite coal was restricted due to the difficulties in transporting it efficiently, and the industry was still small and undeveloped.

The War of 1812 against Great Britain increased the usage of anthracite coal. Prior to the war, citizens of the nation's urban centers such as New York and Philadelphia received most of their coal fuel needs from Britain and Virginia's bituminous coal supplies. During the war the British blockade of American ports severely limited the supply of British bituminous fuel reaching the US, and there was also a shortage in Virginia's supply resulting in a fuel crisis.

Prior to the War of 1812, citizens did not like to use anthracite coal because it was difficult to ignite and maintain, but the wartime shortage forced them to start using anthracite. Jacob Cist of Wilkes-Barre, Pennsylvania promoted the use of anthracite during and after the War of 1812. Jacob Cist's father was a major investor in the Lehigh Coal Mine Company, so Cist began to transport the company's coal to Philadelphia by the Lehigh and Delaware rivers.

Once in Philadelphia, he used testimonials and public demonstrations to negate the stereotype of anthracite and convince Philadelphia society that the hard coal could be used as a replacement for bituminous coal. Cist and other advocates including the Pennsylvania state legislature and government officials continued to promote the anthracite, and the War of 1812 was able to open the way for Pennsylvania anthracite coal to outdo Virginia's bituminous share of the market.

With the opening of the major canals Lehigh, Schuylkill, and Delaware & Hudson in addition to smaller ones such as the Delaware Division and Morris Canals, canal companies successfully provided urban markets for anthracite coal. The anthracite commercial market greatly expanded, and the hard coal was used as valuable fuel for heating and cooking domestically, as well as energy sources for small businesses such as blacksmiths, brewers, bakers, and manufacturers.

=== Lehigh Canal ===
Josiah White and Erskine Hazard founded the Lehigh Navigation Company in 1818. They wanted to use rivers to more efficiently transport anthracite coal. After they were declined a charter to the Schuylkill River, they tried to receive a charter for the Lehigh River. The Lehigh River was located near the Summit Hill Mine, which was mined and operated by the Lehigh Coal Mine Company. Josiah White and Erskine Hazard made a partnership between their company and the Lehigh Coal Mine Company to form the Lehigh Coal & Navigation Company, which was incorporated in 1822. They received a charter from the Pennsylvania legislature giving them the right to improve navigation on the Lehigh River, which effectively granted them a monopoly over the Lehigh. White and Hazard ordered the construction of a roadway to link the Summit Hill Mine and the Lehigh River, and then ordered the building of a canal. By 1840, over 250,000 tons of anthracite mined from the region annually reached Philadelphia through White and Hazard's Lehigh River system.

=== Schuylkill Canal ===
A group of Germans wanted to seek the rights to the Schuylkill River. They received a charter in 1815 to incorporate the Schuylkill Navigation Company, which would have control over the Schuylkill River. After receiving investors, the Schuylkill Navigation Company was able to finance a 108-mile long river and canal system, opened in 1825, that connected the Pottsville area to Philadelphia. By the early 1840s, some 500,000 tons of anthracite coal was being transported annually to Philadelphia using the Schuylkill River.

=== Delaware & Hudson Canal ===
The Wurts brothers, William and Maurice, owned coalfields in the Moosic Mountains near Carbondale, Pennsylvania, within the Northeastern Pennsylvania anthracite region, but they found an unresponsive market in Philadelphia, which was receiving coal from the Schuylkill and Lehigh routes. They saw business potential in finding a connection route between anthracite fields and the New York City market, so they had the Delaware and Hudson Canal Company incorporated in 1823. Starting in 1825, the D&H Company built a canal system, stretching from Honesdale, Pennsylvania to Rondout, New York, across parts of the Delaware and Hudson Rivers. In October 1828, the canal was open to navigation

== Railway ==
The rise of the railway system expanded the anthracite coal industry. In 1826, the D&H company chartered the second railway in the United States, the Delaware and Hudson Gravity Railroad. This railroad was a subsidiary of the Delaware and Hudson Canal, built to carry coal from the Wurts brother's coal mines to the canal. It operated from 1829 until 1899, and some of its rails later became the first trackage of the Delaware and Hudson Railroad

The D&H Company was also one of the first to attempt the use of steam locomotives in the United States. They purchased a locomotive from England so they could transport coal from the mines to their canal, and tested it on a railroad track in 1829. The locomotive ultimately failed, since it was too heavy for the wooden track, but demand was sparked for lighter locomotives that could transport coal from the mines to the canals.

In 1839, the Philadelphia and Reading Railroad was opened connecting Reading, Pennsylvania in the southern anthracite region to Philadelphia. Through acquisitions, it eventually went north to the Schuylkill field and east towards the Lehigh region. It faced competition with the Schuylkill Navigation Company, until the Reading Railroad eventually leased out the Schuylkill Navigation Company in 1870.

In the 1930s, locomotives that solely transported coal from mines to canal entries were in use, but goals were set to use railroads to bypass canals all together.

In 1855, Asa Packer opened the Lehigh Valley Railroad (LVRR) to compete with the Lehigh Coal & Navigation Company's monopoly. The LVRR would eventually link the Mauch Chunk area of Pennsylvania all the way through New Jersey to New York City.

Opened in December 1851, and running from Scranton to Great Bend, Pennsylvania, the Delaware, Lackawanna & Western Railroad would become the major carrier of anthracite from the northern fields to New York City.

While the extensive railroad systems made transporting more efficient, they also lowered the price of coal in distant markets such as Philadelphia and NYC relative to the prices in areas surrounding the mines. In 1840 the wholesale price of anthracite in Philadelphia relative to the mine price was 3.6, and by 1864 the ratio was 1.3. A similar drop occurred with the New York prices.

== Iron industry ==
The usage of anthracite coal in the iron industry increased demand for hard coal. Since the late 18th century, coke, which was bituminous coal with the impurities burned away, was used as fuel to make iron in Britain. With the spread of popularity of anthracite in the early 19th century, iron makers began experimenting with using anthracite as fuel in iron production. It wasn't until 1840 when David Thomas introduced Welsh hot blast technology to the Lehigh Crane Iron Company that anthracite was successfully used to smelt iron.

Using anthracite saved up to 25% in the production of iron, and the quality of the iron was also superior. By the 1850s, anthracite was used in the manufacture of about half of all crude iron produced in the US. The increased efficiency of anthracite heat was also instrumental in the manufacture of metal machinery and the transformation of water into steam for machinery power.

== Civil War ==
The American Civil War created a shift in the makeup of the anthracite coal industry. Prior to the Civil War, the industry involved many small-scale mines with short-term leases resulting in increasing production levels but an overall trend of falling prices.

In 1830, anthracite coal was selling for $11 per ton, in 1840 it was $7 per ton, and by 1860 it was $5.50 a ton in NYC, while total production was increasing. This was due in part to a general anti-charter sentiment towards the coal industry by the Pennsylvania state government, making it difficult for coal corporations to receive charters, as well as a seasonal market that experienced fluctuation in demand for anthracite. The onset of the war brought an increased need for fuel for the army, and in turn an expected increase in demand for coal.

The boom of investment in the coal industry and predicted large-scale production of anthracite coal shifted the mentality of the Pennsylvania state government, and the legislature dramatically increased the number and quality of charters it granted to mining companies. Individual proprietors fell to the expansion of corporations who could master the large-scale production and efficient transportation that the wartime economy called for. The major railroad companies came to dominate the industry as they began to purchase coalfields in order to control both the production and shipping aspects. With increased concentration of capital among the smaller number of operations they were able to create deeper and deeper mining shafts to reach new levels of coal.

By the end of the 19th century, the Pennsylvania anthracite industry was controlled by a handful of major railroad corporations.

== See also ==
- Bootleg mining
- Coal mining in Northeastern Pennsylvania

== Sources and further reading ==
- Adams, Sean P. "The US Coal Industry in the Nineteenth Century". EHnet. Economic History Association.
- Adams, Sean Patrick (2008). "Warming the Poor and Growing Consumers: Fuel Philanthropy in the Early Republic's Urban North". The Journal of American History. 95 (1): 69–94. doi:10.2307/25095465. ISSN 0021-8723. JSTOR 25095465.
- Bartholomew, Ann M.; Metz, Lance E.; Kneis, Michael (1989). Delaware and Lehigh Canals (First ed.). Oak Printing Company, Bethlehem, Pennsylvania: Center for Canal History and Technology, Hugh Moore Historical Park and Museum, Inc., Easton, Pennsylvania. pp. 4–5. ISBN 0-930973-09-7. LCCN 89-25150.
- Mathews, Alfred; Hungerford, Austin N (1884). "Progress of Settlements and Internal Improvements in Carbon County". History of the counties of Lehigh and Carbon, in the Commonwealth of Pennsylvania. Philadelphia: Everts & Richards. OCLC 1046543382.
- Chandler, Alfred D. (1972). "Anthracite Coal and the Beginnings of the Industrial Revolution in the United States". The Business History Review. 46 (2): 141–181. doi:10.2307/3113503. ISSN 0007-6805. JSTOR 3113503.
- Day, James Sanders (2005). "Review of Old Dominion, Industrial Commonwealth: Coal, Politics, and Economy in Antebellum America". The Business History Review. 79 (2): 370–373. doi:10.1017/S0007680500080636. ISSN 0007-6805. JSTOR 25097033.
- Dublin, Thomas; Licht, Walter (2005). "Creating The Anthracite Region". The Face of Decline: The Pennsylvania Anthracite Region in the Twentieth Century. Ithaca: Cornell UP. pp. 9–28. doi:10.7591/9781501707308. ISBN 978-1-5017-0730-8.
- Edmunds, W. E. (2002). Coal in Pennsylvania (PDF). 4th ser., Educational Series 7 (2nd ed.). Archived from the original (PDF) on June 9, 2011.
- "Geology – Coal". Pennsylvania Department of Conservation and Natural Resources.
- Hoffman, John N. (1978). "Pennsylvania's Bituminous Coal Industry: An Industry Review". Pennsylvania History: A Journal of Mid-Atlantic Studies. 45 (4): 351–363. ISSN 0031-4528. JSTOR 27772555.
- Latzko, David A. (2011). Coal Mining and Regional Economic Development in Pennsylvania, 1810–1980 (PDF) (Thesis). Pennsylvania State University, York Campus. Archived from the original (PDF) on 2021-04-26.
- Monroe, Douglas Keith. "A Decade of Turmoil: John L. Lewis and the Anthracite Miners 1926-1936." (PhD dissrtation, Georgetown University; ProQuest Dissertations Publishing, 1977. 7722848).
- "Pennsylvania Mining History". Pennsylvania Department of Environmental Protection.
- Sciaky, Leon (1941). "The Rondout and Its Canal". New York History. 22 (3): 272–289. ISSN 0146-437X. JSTOR 23134914.
