= Lehigh Coal and Navigation Company =

The Lehigh Coal and Navigation Company (LCAN) (1988–2010) was a modern-day anthracite coal mining company headquartered in Pottsville, Pennsylvania. It acquired many properties and relaunched the Lehigh Coal Companies brand in 1988. The LCAN ran strip mining operations in the Panther Creek Valley east of Lansford, Pennsylvania along U.S. Route 209 with vast properties dominating the coal areas of Tamaqua, Coaldale, and Lansford.

LCAN properties were largely Panther Creek Valley-based real estate assets that were acquired from Lehigh Coal Mine Company and Lehigh Coal & Navigation Company, which built the Lehigh Canal and the first American blast furnaces, both which spearheaded the American industrial revolution.

The new company was incorporated in 1988, acquiring LC&N assets after bankruptcy proceedings.

== History ==
=== 19th century ===
The Lehigh Coal & Navigation Company was a prominent coal mining and transportation infrastructure company first established in 1822 after four years of successfully delivering regular shipments of anthracite coal to the docks of Philadelphia via their pioneering Lehigh Canal.

In the merger of The Lehigh Coal Mining Company and the Lehigh Navigation Company, both of which operated in the Lehigh Valley area of Pennsylvania between 1818 and 1822, the lease on the land rights of the Lehigh Coal Mine Company was ended with a subsidiary acquisition purchase by stock swap, and these lands were used to open up the whole Northeastern Pennsylvania frontier in the 19th and early 20th centuries, including Tamaqua, Coaldale, Lansford, Summit Hill, Nesquehoning, and Jim Thorpe, Pennsylvania, and other towns on the 14 miles (23 km) long strip in which the LCAN 'New Company' operated.

The remaining 8,000-acre anthracite-rich tract between Jim Thorpe and Tamaqua originally owned by the Lehigh Coal Mine Company is arguably the richest vein of high quality anthracite in the world with the possible exception of the valley floor deposits of the Wyoming Valley. Like most commercially feasible coal mines today in the U.S., the ongoing mining operations use mountain top mining techniques.

=== 20th century ===
In the 1960s, LC&N ceased its operations. The coal lands were acquired by the Fazio Brothers.

LC&N ceased its operations in the mid-1960s, and eventually the railroad's revenues collapsed as the Central Railroad of New Jersey, Lehigh and New England Railroad, the Lehigh Valley Railroad, and a few others that were merged into Conrail.

In 1974, Bethlehem Steel acquired it, running it until 1989. In 1989, James Curran bought the property and reestablished the Lehigh Coal & Navigation Company brand.

=== 21st century ===
The earlier company, called "the Old Company" had owned and operated an extensive system of coal mines in Carbon and Schuylkill Counties, two canals, the Lehigh Canal and the Delaware Division of the Pennsylvania Canal, the historic Mauch Chunk & Summit Hill Railway, Ashley Planes, and the Lehigh and Susquehanna Railroad (L&S).

The L&S extended from the foot of River Street in Wilkes Barre and North Branch Canal docks at Wilkes Barre, Pennsylvania on the Susquehanna River to the Lehigh River Gorge past Mauch Chunk, Allentown and Easton, Pennsylvania. In the 1870s, the L&S was leased to the Central Railroad of New Jersey), which extended the route into a Scranton-NYC prestige line. It also built the Mauch Chunk Switchback Railway to move coal.

The LCAN company was founded by James J. Curran, a Schuylkill County attorney.

In 2004, the reestablished company was forced into bankruptcy by some of its creditors, and some of its land was at risk of being sold for back taxes.

In 2006, the company's operations were suspended unless Curran stepped aside and kept out of actual operations, citing a violation of a consent decree from previous complaints, so a new management team took over.

In 2008, he mainline pioneered by the LC&N are still the mainstay of several key transportation corridors in Northeastern Pennsylvania and operated by Norfolk-Southern, or Reading, Blue Mountain and Northern Railroads.

Lehigh Coal and Navigation Company was cited for environmental regulatory violations, and was fined on several occasions.

Later in 2008, CAN declared bankruptcy and was acquired by creditors, who rebranded it as Lehigh Anthracite.
