= Erskine Hazard =

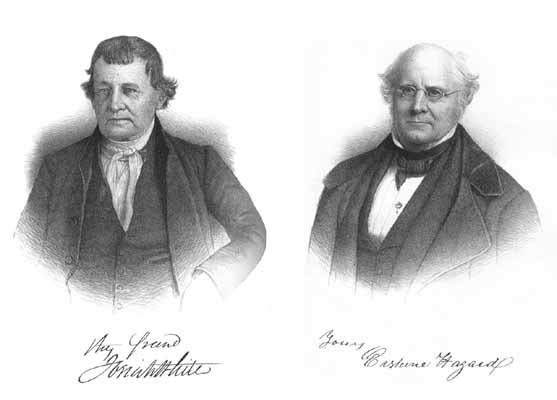
A 19th century illustration of Hazard and Josiah White, his partner

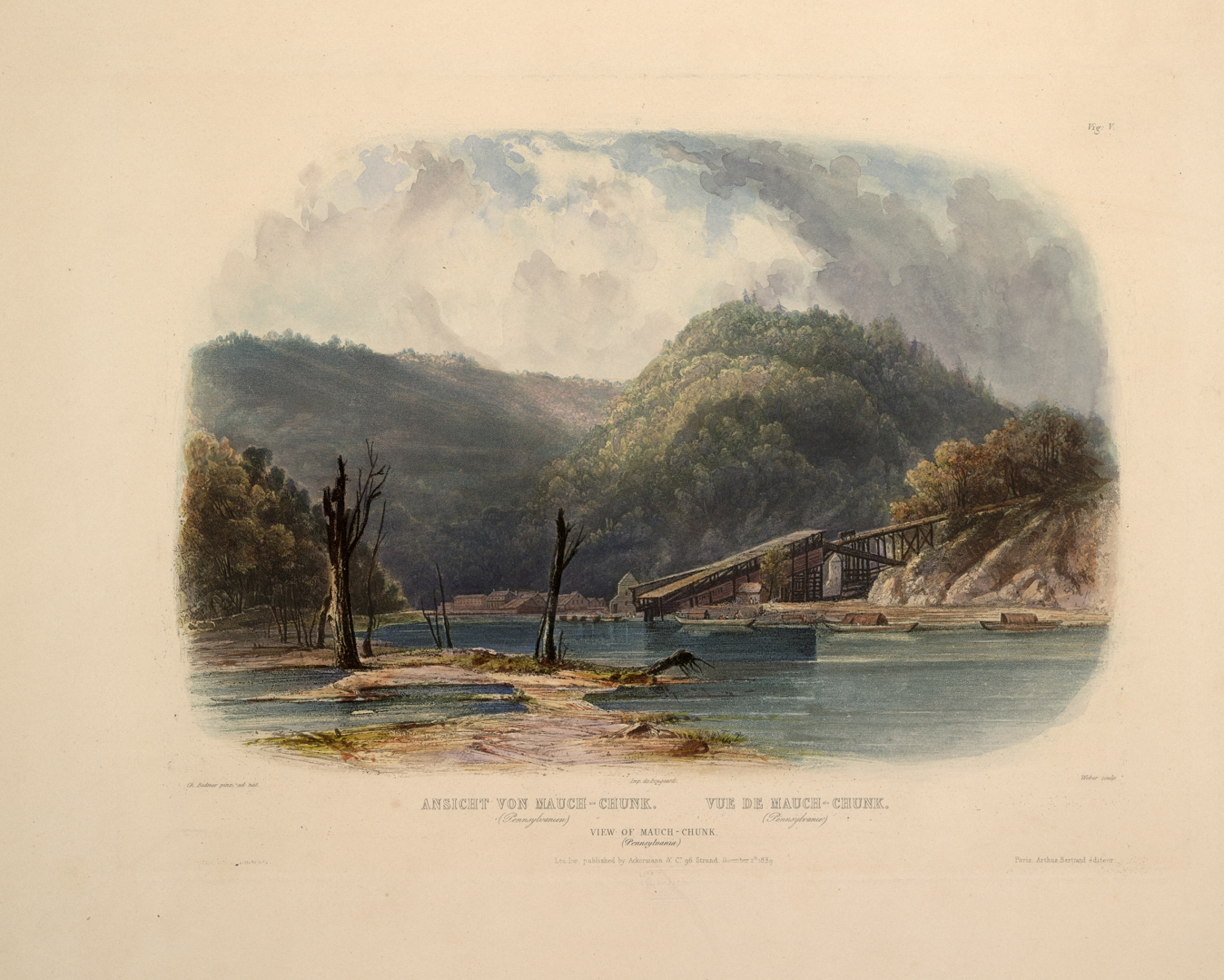
Hazard assessed what was necessary to make the Lehigh River navigable, at least temporarily enough to float coal barges past obstacles and the constant grade road bed, which descended about 1,100 feet (340 m) in 9 miles (14 km) from Summit Hill to the coal chute designed by White to load barges in present-day Jim Thorpe.

Erskine Hazard (November 30, 1789 – February 26, 1865) and his partner Josiah White were industrialists who developed infrastructure projects in Pennsylvania and throughout the Northeastern United States, which proved influential in ushering in the Industrial Revolution in the United States, which served as a foundation for the rise of the United States as the world's foremost economic power.

== Early life ==
Hazard was born in New York City, on November 30, 1789.

== Partnership ==
In 1810, Hazard and Josiah White opened a foundry and wire drawing plant on the falls of the Schuylkill River near Philadelphia in 1810. Their first reputation establishing event was to build a small suspension bridge across the Schuylkill in order to better demonstrate their factory. When the U.S. President put an embargo in place on Bituminous coal imports from Great Britain in the tension prior to the War of 1812, the partners moved to secure an anthracite supply, which was then a barely known and unutilized commodity.

The discovery of anthracite in eastern Pennsylvania by hunter Philip Ginter in 1791 was large accidental. In the Lehigh Valley region, coal was discovered on Sharp mountain, where Summit Hill, Pennsylvania is now located. The discovery led to an appreciation of the value of the mineral on the part of the general public and to its being mined and placed on the market. (Note: Others credit known deposits in 'Room Run' and 'Beaver Meadows' —both locales would find Hazard, White, and the LC&N Co. playing a role in exploiting the outcrops, as would the Wyoming Valley via the Ashley Planes and LH&S RR.)

== Pioneering ==
Educated as a geographer and surveyor Hazard would complement White's mechanical innovations with resourceful use of given landforms and the two would go on together to found what is arguably the most influential company of the first half of the 19th century, the Lehigh Coal & Navigation Company, build the Lehigh Canal, the Ashley Planes, the Lehigh and Susquehanna Railroad, and a half-dozen other subsidiary railroads and industries, most of which would last into the 1960s. They also had a major role in inspiring the use by others of the hard to burn anthracite, initially in industrial processes and later in large supplies transported to Philadelphia along the Schuylkill River valley.

Hazard the geographer and surveyor pioneered a technique which became standardized in the rail transport industry, and indeed, adopted in building many roads and ramps; that of dividing the overall height from the starting reference point to the destination by the distance, then setting the grade regardless of excavations needed, or supports needing constructed of the road to maintain that average slope. He used the technique when surveying the initial mule road the Lehigh Coal Company used to connect the new settlement and mines at Summit Hill, Pennsylvania with the loading chute at what would become Jim Thorpe, Pennsylvania. When the company decided to lay rails along the mule trail, the pre-graded slope allowed the workers to lay rails over the nine mile descent in only a few months of conversion.

== Legacy ==
Hazard died in 1865 a wealthy individual that had, along with partner-mentor Josiah White, created thousands of jobs and founded whole industries unknown in their youth. Railroading grew up from the early strap iron angles attached to hardwood tracks to T-rails which have common ancestry with today's steel welded rails. Their influence goes farther than listed below, for they made many capital investments, and those which fit their overall coal-iron business were sometimes bought out when they proved successful. Others in need of additional investment were finished by the two, or by the board of LC&N Co. then either sold off when profitable or retained as part of the LC&N Co. family of subsidiaries, while a third were just investments made part of a portfolio, having no relation to LC&N Co. assets other than that of a common individual owner.

Hazard Street, a primary thorofare in Summit Hill, Pennsylvania, is named in Hazard's honor.

== Towns from rural wilderness ==
- Coaldale
- East Mauch Chunk
- Lansford
- Mauch Chunk
- Summit Hill
- Tamaqua
- Tresckow

=== Companies ===
- Ashley Planes
- Lehigh & Susquehanna Railroad
- Lehigh Canal
- Lehigh Coal & Navigation Company
- Lehigh Crane Iron Works
- Panther Creek Railroad
- Panther Creek Valley
- Summit Hill & Mauch Chunk Railroad
