= Ark (river boat) =

Type of river boat in North America

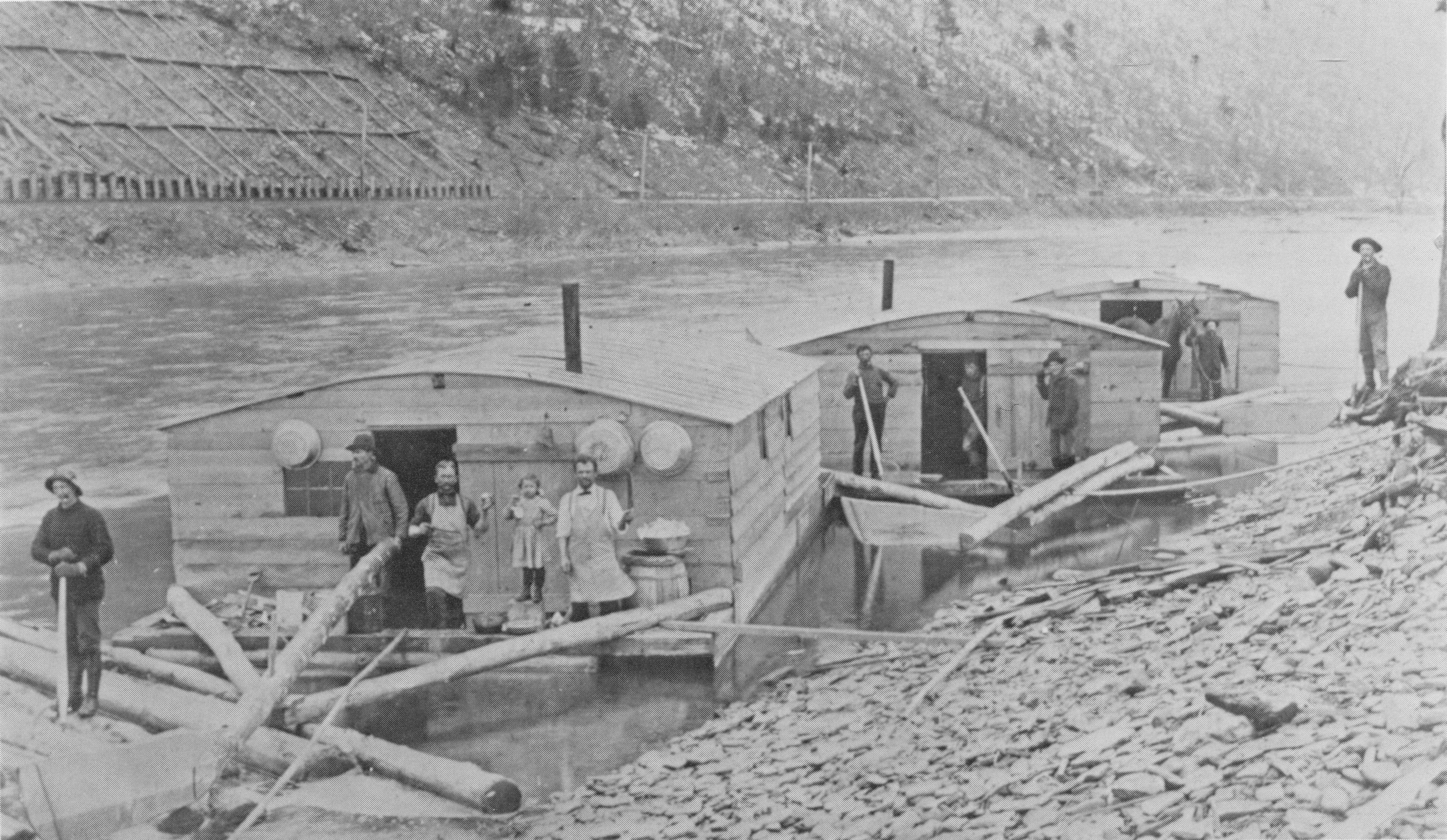
Three arks for a log drive on Pine Creek in Lycoming County or Tioga County. The left ark was for cooking and dining, the middle ark was the sleeping quarters, and the right ark was for the draft horses. The arks were built for just one trip down river and then dismantled and sold for their lumber. The line of the Jersey Shore, Pine Creek and Buffalo Railway can be seen on the eastern shore, and the mountainside behind it is nearly bare of trees from clear-cutting.

In early periods of North American industrial development, an ark was a temporary boat used for river transport in eastern North America before slack-water canals (a lock system and appropriate dams allowing two way travel) and railroads made them obsolete. Because they could be built using relatively crude hand tools, arks were built in American colonial and early republic times, primarily to carry cargo downriver on the spring freshets, and especially to carry milled lumber, charcoal and other forest products and bulk agricultural produce to a city or a port downriver. While logs were often tied into rafts, on long trips which could take weeks, the rafts would be accompanied by such arks as crew support quarters. Deep rivers allowed large log arks as described below instead of less controllable rafts. Since by 1800, most eastern towns and cities were short on heating fuels, even badly processed timber or planks could readily be sold at the destinations.

The energy shortages were alleviated when arks could transport coal. In the Eastern United States arks became more frequently used due to the 1816 invention of Josiah White's Bear Trap Lock system. The mechanisms allowed controllable artificially created freshets which enabled the opening of the 45 miles (72 km) of the Lower Lehigh Canal (c. 1818–1820), and allowed the first extensive shipments of anthracite coal, a new high tech fuel, to eastern cities experiencing energy shortages. For ten years, more and more arks were built and sent to the docks in Philadelphia.

By the time the long-delayed (Note: Joshiah White had proved a ship canal compatible design by constructing four of them in the 1822 and 1823 rebuilding of ice damages; these would have handled period-typical sailing vessels over 30 feet (9.1 m) wide plus a steam tug. In mid-1823 LC&N then proposed, at its own expense, both to install such on the Delaware River and complete their upgrades of the Lehigh with compatible locks—which would have allowed sea going shipping access to Mauch Chunk's slack water pool and the coal loading chutes at the end of the future Summit Hill and Mauch Chunk Railroad. But the Pennsylvania Legislature instead listened to timber interests, which generally floated large rafts of logs down river and feared dams would be an obstacle to their deliveries. They counter-proposed what became the Delaware Canal of the ambitious and comprehensive programs that established the Pennsylvania Canal System—at great expense to LC&N from the great delay before it was ready. Ironically, the LC&N board, understanding the need to stop the costly business of building non-reusable boats, would end up floating many rafts of logs down to the building slips at Lausanne at the mouth of the Nesquehoning Creek above Mauch Chunk.) opening of the Delaware Canal reached partial operation in 1831 and it could switch to another form of river boat, the Lehigh Coal & Navigation Company was annually deforesting vast timber stands reaching by then more than 16 miles (26 km) upriver through the steep-banked waters of the Lehigh River Gorge to ship enough coal to meet demand in Philadelphia. Pennsylvania State Historian Fred Brenckman in The History of Carbon County notes that the production of ark river craft in 1831 by the LC&N would total over 13 miles (21 km) connected end to end.

The boats used during the early years on the Lehigh consisted of square boxes, or arks, from sixteen to eighteen feet wide, and about twenty-five feet long.

At first two of these were joined together by means of hinges, to permit of the undulations produced in passing the dams and sluices. As the men became more expert in their work and as the channel was straightened and improved, the number of sections was increased till, finally, their whole length reached one hundred and eighty feet. They were steered with long oars, like a raft.

Boats of this description were used on the Lehigh to the end of the year 1831. During that year more than forty thousand tons of coal passed down the river, which required the building of so many boats that, had they all been joined in one length, they would have extended over a distance of more than thirteen miles.

— Fred Brenckman, Official Historian of Pennsylvania, History of Carbon County (1884)

Upon arrival, the cargo was sold, the ark was dismantled and its lumber was also sold, and the ark pilots returned home on foot or horseback.

Despite the slowness of the craft, it was stable, and with a skilled crew was capable of maneuvering through fairly narrow points. Other river craft, usually the bateau, worked alongside the arks, ferrying the workers while the horses and bunks and supplies floated down the larger, stable structures.

Some arks in the Pennsylvania Canal System and Susquehanna River system were up to 75 feet (23 m) long, while the modular ark trains on the Lehigh Canal were coupled as long as 220 feet (67 m), but could only navigate the descending locks half at a time. (Note: While the Lehigh had larger locks, and White had wanted to build for ships plus tugs, the "on the cheap design" of the Delaware Canal was designed with singleton locks of only 95 feet (29 m) by 10.5 feet (3.2 m) costing Lehigh Coal & Navigation Company untold millions over the 100 years it was used to deliver cargoes off the Lehigh.)

The arks within the Greenbrier River in West Virginia averaged sixty feet save for the larger cooking arks used to feed loggers four times a day. The river ark was once a common sight along the Greenbrier River in West Virginia, with the spring floods bringing miles of white pine logs from Pocahontas County to Greenbrier County. Photographs of these massive vessels were posted along the Greenbrier River Trail at the town of Caldwell, West Virginia. These photographs illustrate integral scenes in W. E. Blackhurst's book, Riders of the Flood. The author based the plot along the world of the river logging era at the turn of the century within the area of the yet-to-be-created Monongahela National Forest. He had a meticulous interest in historical detail. In it he gives one of the clearest written descriptions of the river ark:

The ark was built on a solid platform of logs. The heavy logs laid side by side formed a raft sixty feet long and twenty-four feet wide. Running crosswise at each four-foot interval, lash poles (lashing of hickory or locust) were placed. These were about six inch in diameter. At the point where the lash pole crossed each foundation log, a strong, U-shaped bow of bent white oak pinned it firmly to the log. The bows had been worked from straight lengths of oak one and a half inches square and bent to the U-shape. Both open ends were left square, and the body of the bow was shaved down and rounded. On each side of the lash pole, square holes had been cut deep into the foundation logs. Into these holes the squared ends were driven, thus bringing the bow down tight against the lash pole. A strong wedge of ash wood held each squared end tightly in place.

Lengthwise to the long platform, and resting across the lash poles, ran six-by-six sawed timbers. These formed the foundation for the low building that was erected on the raft. They were also the support for its plank floor. The building was a plain rectangular hut of sawed lumber nailed lengthwise to upright studding. The roof was not wedged, but rounding, an effect gained by the simple expedient of bending roof boards across in a distinct bow.

The building did not cover the entire raft floor. At each end, a six-foot length of space was left open, and along each side the walls were set in a scant two feet, leaving a narrow pathway alongside the building. On each of the four corners of the raft stood a sturdy post of peeled wood. These were the snubbing posts, and were thus placed so that the ark might be tied up from any corner. Seeing Duncan look closely at the posts, Warwick explained, "That's apple wood—the only wood we can find that won't grow rough from the chafing of a rope."

Duncan's interest was keenly aroused by the steering arrangement. On each end of the log platform was placed a short length of log, which was securely fastened to the logs beneath. Projecting upright on this base was a smooth, strong wooden pin. The top of the pin thrust up into the handle of the long steering sweep, thus forming a pivot point. The sweep could be swung from side to side, but always it rested securely on the smooth, upright pin.

The sweep itself was a long, tapered pole of about twenty-foot length. Six feet of the length at the small end projected across the pivoting pin onto the deck. The larger end lay out over the water. To the water end had been attached a broad wooden blade nearly ten feet long. To swing the heavy sweep and guide the cumbersome ark required the strength of two men at each of the sweep handles.

The little building was divided roughly into three parts. At each end were two stalls for horses. The center space was for the carrying of horse feed, harness, and tools, and for the sleeping quarters of the teamsters.

Every September the town of Ronceverte, West Virginia, hosts the play Riders of the Flood, based on the book of the same name. In it, a scaled-down mock-up version of a river ark is part of the set and is a backdrop for the historical accuracy of the project.

The village of Arkport, New York derives its name from this type of transport.
