= Lehigh Coal & Navigation Company =

Defunct mining and transportation company

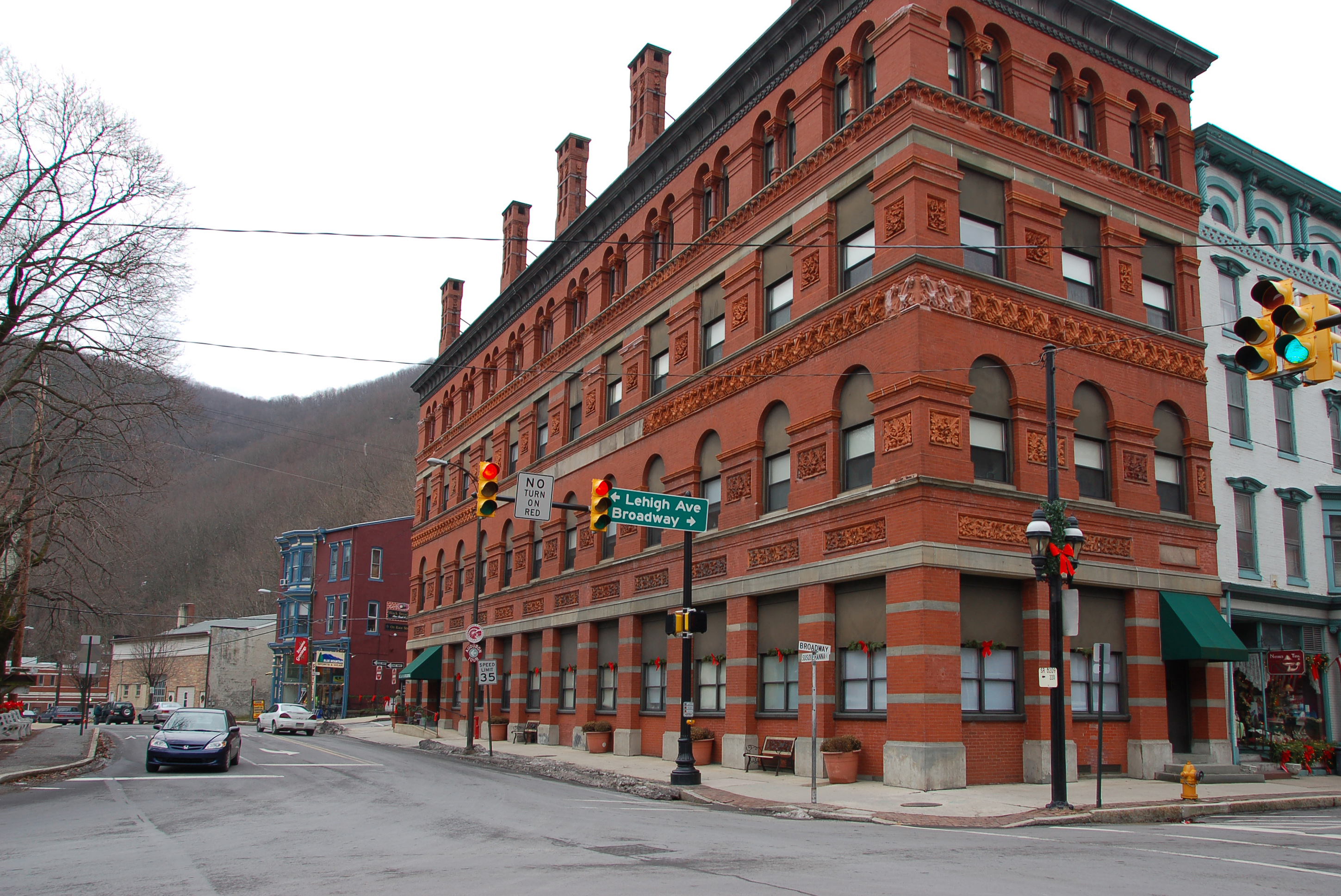
Lehigh Coal & Navigation Company's corporate headquarters in Jim Thorpe, Pennsylvania, across the street from the Lehigh and Susquehanna Railroad, in November 2007

Lehigh Coal & Navigation Company was a mining and transportation company headquartered in Mauch Chunk, now known as Jim Thorpe, Pennsylvania. The company operated from 1818 until its dissolution in 1964 and played an early and influential role in the American Industrial Revolution.

The company ultimately encompassed source industries, transport, and manufacturing, making it the first vertically integrated company in the United States.

== History ==
=== 18th century ===
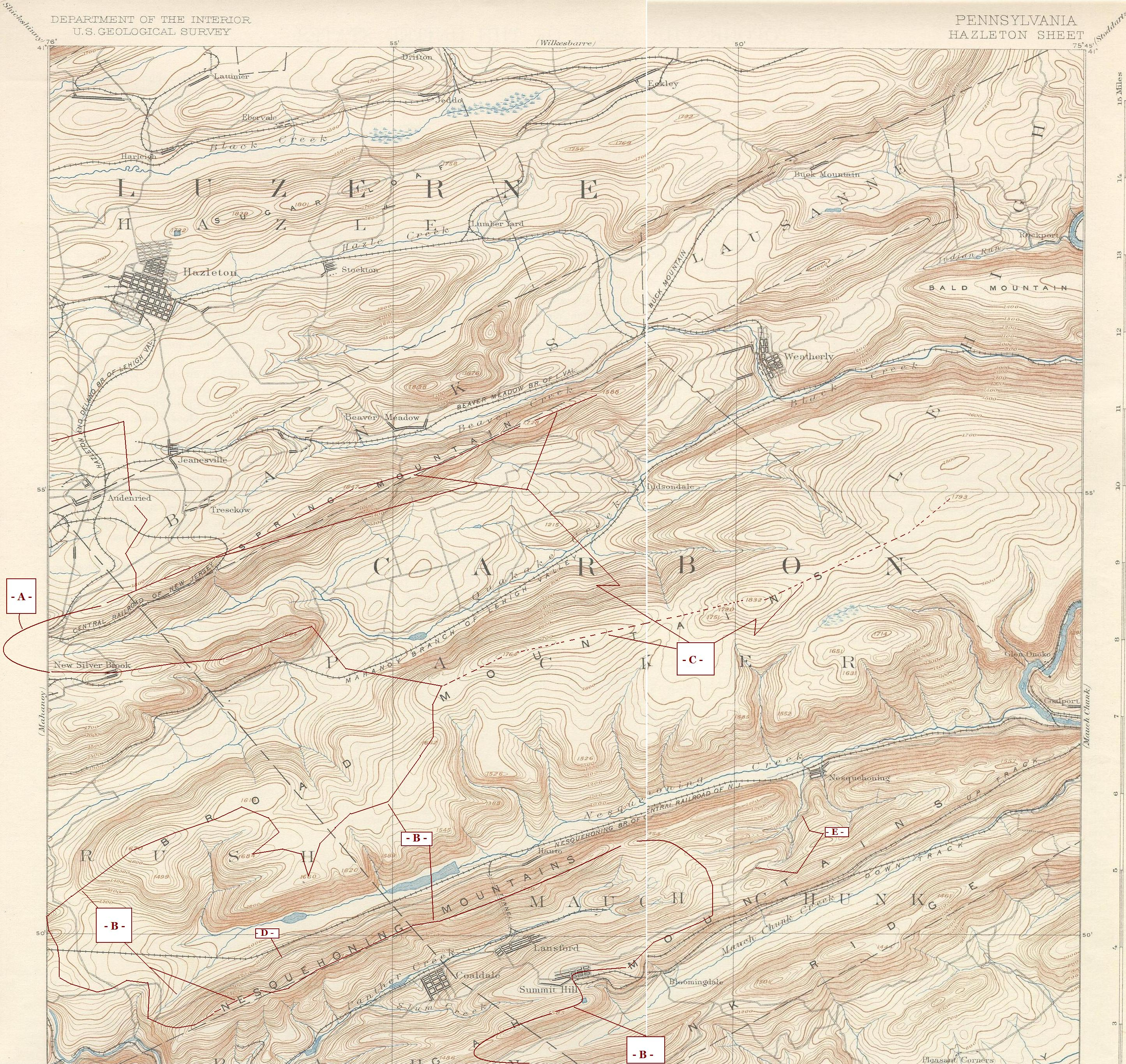
Map of the Coal Region in Northeastern Pennsylvania

In 1791, a hunter named Philip Ginter discovered anthracite coal on Pisgah Mountain near present-day Summit Hill, Pennsylvania close to the border Schuylkill and Carbon counties.

To verify this discovery, Philip Ginder, often called Ginter, gave it to Col. Weiss the very next day. Col. Weiss said he would give Mr. Ginder 300 acres (1.2 km^{2}) of land if he showed where the coal was found, and Mr. Ginder agreed to the deal. Col. Weiss took the specimen by horseback to Philadelphia and had it further inspected by John Nicholson, Michael Hillegas, and brother-in-law Charlie Cist. Upon authentication, Weiss was authorized to grant Ginter what he propositioned for his discovery upon pointing out the exact location where it was found. Ginter built a mill on the tract of land he acquired but was later deprived of it by the owner who had filed a prior claim at the US patent office.

In 1792, Weiss, Hillegas, and Nicholson were some of the original investors in the Lehigh Coal & Navigation Company (LCMC). However, management proved inadequate and attempted to operate in an absentee manner. Company personnel ambitiously attempted to trek to the mine site, dig the anthracites, and then use mules to transport bags of it to the Lehigh River, which required cutting down trees and building crude arks near Lausanne Landing and then shooting the Lehigh River's rapids, hoping to reach the river's confluence with the Delaware River at Easton on the Pennsylvania border with New Jersey. The Lehigh Coal Mining Company was sporadically successfully in mining and transporting anthracite coal to Philadelphia, and its rights were eventually absorbed by the Lehigh Coal & Navigation Company, which leased their own operational rights from their predecessor, the Lehigh Coal Company.

==== Lehigh Coal Mine Company ====
In 1792, the Lehigh Coal Mine Company (LCMC) was first funded by Michael Hillegas, Jacob Weiss, and John Nicholson. It was incorporated the following year, in 1793, and the company also acquired 10,000 acres (4,000 ha) in and around Panther Creek Valley and Pisgah Mountain, and the aim of hauling anthracite coal from the large deposits on Pisgah Mountain near what is now Summit Hill, Pennsylvania, to Philadelphia via mule train to arks built near Lausanne (Note: Lausanne Township, and Tavern/Inn was a small pre-1800s settlement near the mouth of Nesquehoning Creek and the upper Lehigh. 19th century historians often mention the place as it was also one terminus of the TB found turnpike connecting the Lehigh Valley through Beaver Meadows and the Susquehanna River valleys.) on the Lehigh and Delaware rivers.

The mining camps were over nine miles from the Lehigh River at Mauch Chunk. Sporadically active between the years of 1792 and 1814, the Lehigh Coal Mine Company was able to sell all of the coal it could mine to fuel-hungry markets but lost many a boatload on the rough waters of the unimproved Lehigh River, contributing to lost operating profits for the company and sometimes outright losses. (Note: According to Brenckman's History of Carbon County, the last LCMC operation, launched in the shortages worsened by the War of 1812, built five boats and filled them, spending over a year overall. Three of the five sank before reaching safe waters, and the two remnants were purchased by White and Hazard.)

The owners later sold some coal to Josiah White and Erskine Hazard, who operated a wire mill foundry at the Schuylkill River falls near Philadelphia. White and Hazard were delighted by the quality of the fuel, and subsequently bought the LCMC's final two barges to survive the trip down the Lehigh River.

=== 19th century ===
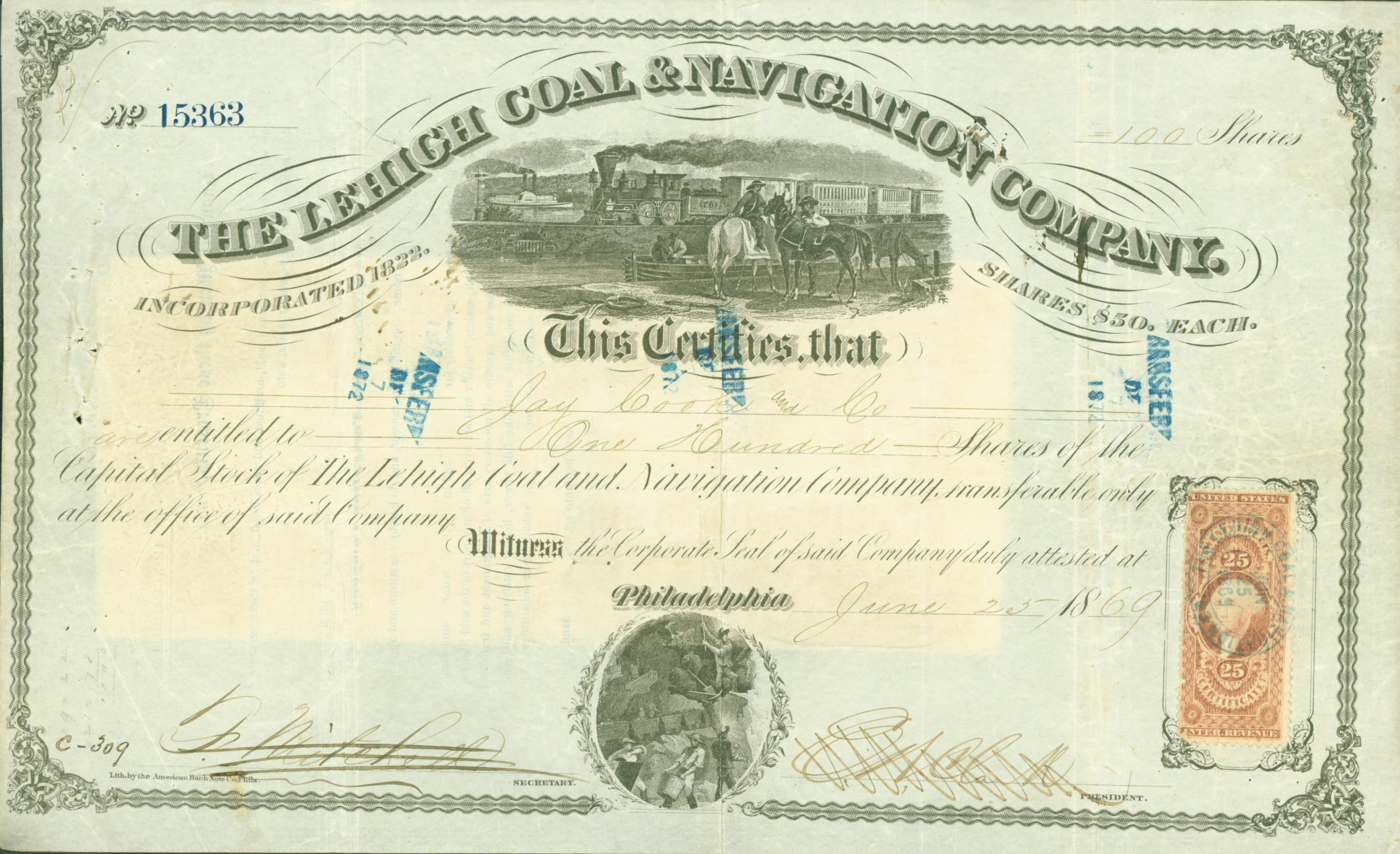
Share of the Lehigh Coal & Navigation Company, issued 25 June 1869

In 1815, convinced they could much improve the reliability of its delivery, they began in 1815 to inquire after the rights to mine the LCMC's coal and hatched a plan to improve navigation on the Lehigh River as a key step.

In 1818 two companies were founded by Erskine Hazard, Josiah White, and George F. A. Hauto: the Lehigh Navigation Company (incorporated March 20, 1818), and the Lehigh Coal Company (incorporated October 21, 1818), for the purposes of constructing the Lehigh Canal and mining coal on the LCMC's land. Two years later on April 21, 1820 the two companies were consolidated under the title of the Lehigh Coal and Navigation Company, after Hazard and White had bought Hauto out of both companies. Founders Hazard and White entered the coal industry to serve customers seeking a steady supply of fuel for foundries and mills on the falls of the Schuylkill River (including mills already owned by Hazard and White themselves). Its role in accelerating regional industrial development by taking on civil engineering challenges initially thought impossible and creating important transport and mining infrastructure, proved influential in spearheading the Industrial Revolution in the United States.

The Lehigh Canal became usable in 1820, was improved further between 1821 and 1824, and was finally transformed into a two-way canal between 1827 and 1829. The Lehigh Canal played a hugely influential role in the nation's ability to transport anthracite coal, a primary energy source at the time, to the company's primary markets in the Northeastern United States. By the early 1830s, the Lehigh Canal and its bridges along the Delaware River inspired the development and connection of four other regional canals.

Lehigh Coal & Navigation Company's success, along with White's reputation for advancing the state of mining and civil engineering, jump started the Canal Age in the U.S. (Note: The Lehigh Canal was a landmark achievement, succeeding where a weary list of attempts to improve the Lehigh Rivers navigability had failed. Delivering ever increasing tonnages of coal from 1818, and by providing the new high tech fuel, anthracite coal, the LCC and LNC's successes and failures (Severe ice damage to the canal in both 1821 and 1824, were quickly repaired restoring services and avoiding an energy shortfall before coal stocks were depleted.) and other news worthy events, such as Josiah White's petition to the state to allow a ship canal lock system be chartered on the Delaware in 1823, kept the company very visible.) It also spurred historically significant investments in raw materials and bulk transportation infrastructure projects. (Note: The Delaware and Hudson Canal and railroads were directly inspired by LC&N's successes; the brothers pushing the project began searching for anthracite in 1821, months after Arks of coal had reached Philadelphia.) The company also supported funding efforts behind the Schuylkill Canal project, which began in 1814, and was finally funded and finished with the company's support. White and Hazard had backed the Schuylkill project since their mills were on the river, but became disgusted with the timid investment and management attitudes of its board, so they explored property and feasibility examinations elsewhere in 1814–1815 and petitioned to build the canal that next year. Upon their return, the company's two founders took over Lehigh Coal Mining Company's mines and mining rights in a 20-year lease. built the Lehigh and Susquehanna Railroad and had its hands in many other northeastern Pennsylvania shortline railroads, spurs, and subsidiaries; created the Ashley Planes and made or supported means to other novel solutions of transport problems; (Note: Bringing affordable steel processes and then making the first wire rope factory, justify the conclusion.) and created transport corridors still important today. (Note: Virtually all main trackage (away from the Delaware River) except the Ashley Planes and Summit Hill and Mauch Chunk Railroads laid down by the company in a rail corridor, or its eventual subsidiaries, still operated by the Reading, Blue Mountain and Northern, or the Norfolk-Southern Railways. The Lehigh and New England Railroad and some of the trackage along the Lehigh River once belonging to the Lehigh Valley Railroad and the Lehigh and Susquehanna Railroad subsidiary company suffered attrition and abandonment. Conrail kept some parallel trackage and tore up other redundant stretches.)It also pioneered the mining of anthracite coal in the United States, acquiring virtually the entire eastern lobe of the Southern Pennsylvania Coal Region, and brought in Welsh experts to bootstrap Iron production using blast furnace technology in the Lehigh Valley, building the first six such furnaces and puddling furnaces to create steel, which the company then provided to its own wire rope (steel cable) manufactury, the countries first it set up in Mauch Chunk. Completing the vertical integration, the wire ropes were then marketed to other mining operations, cable railways, and other industries needing high tensile reliability in managing weighty loads.

In 1822, Lehigh Coal Company bought out partner George Hauto and formed the Lehigh Coal & Navigation Company (LC&N) by combining the Lehigh Coal Mining Company, the Lehigh Coal Company, which was leased, and the Lehigh Navigation Company. The transactions represented the first merger of interlocking companies in the nation's history. Five years later, (Note: The Delaware and Hudson Canal project (New York charter) needed to charter land grant rights to construct the gravity railroad and inclined planes of the Pennsylvania subsidiary Delaware and Hudson Gravity Railroad, which they applied for in 1826 and news of that may have inspired White and Hazard to lay rails to improve throughput on their mule powered wagon road. Early operations without rails sent coal down once a day, needing over an hour to reach the bottom chute building dump track, and the round trip back took most of a day, even in summer. After rails were laid, mules pulling the 5 long tons (5.1 t) hopper cars back up the 9 miles (14 km) trip only took four hours, so twice a day deliveries became the rule.) the company built the Mauch Chunk and Summit Hill Railroad, the first coal railroad and just the second railroad company in the country to be constructed after the Granite Railroad in Quincy, Massachusetts. (Note: 1826 saw several important rail transport companies obtain incorporation, charters, or both, but only the first chartered in Pennsylvania, the Delaware and Hudson Gravity Railroad began construction before 1830 alongside the Baltimore & Ohio. By 1827 the SH&MCRR had carried passengers and was charging passengers in 1829)

The company was founded by industrialists Josiah White and Erskine Hazard, who sought to improve delivery of coal to markets. and a German immigrant miner named Hauto.

The company is known in the Lehigh Valley as the "Old Company", as distinct from the later 1988–2010 company, which was very similarly named the Lehigh Coal and Navigation Company and was known as the "New Company" in the region.

=== Lehigh Coal Company ===
White and Hazard very shortly found themselves on the receiving end of investor criticisms that the improvements and mining operation at Summit Hill were failing and were both considered crackpot schemes. The majority opinion was that improvements were possible, but that coal mining was less likely to succeed. They secured additional investors by forming two companies, the Lehigh Coal Company (LCC) and the Lehigh Navigation Company, and began seeking legislative approval for improving the Lehigh River's navigation.

The desired opportunity "to ruin themselves," as one member of the Legislature put it, was granted by an act passed March 20, 1818. The various powers applied for, and granted, embraced the whole range of tried and untried methods for securing "a navigation downward once in three days for boats loaded with one hundred barrels, or ten tons." The State kept its weather eye open in this matter, however, for a small minority felt that these men would not ruin themselves. Accordingly, the act of grant reserved to the commonwealth the right to compel the adoption of a complete system of slack-water navigation from Easton to Stoddartsville if the service given by the company did not meet "the wants of the country."

— Brenckman, History of Carbon County, Pennsylvania (1884)

In 1817, they leased the Lehigh Coal Mine's properties and took over operations, incorporating it on October 21, 1818, as the Lehigh Coal Company. They petitioned the legislature and proposed acquiring rights to make improvements to the Lehigh River for which there had been a string of supportive legislation going back decades. In 1820, White and Hazard bought out their partner Hauto and dissolved the Lehigh Coal Company on April 21, 1820.

Under the conditions of the lease, it was stipulated that, after a given time for preparation, they should deliver for their own benefit at least forty thousand bushels of coal annually in Philadelphia and the surrounding districts, and should pay, if demanded, one ear of corn as a yearly rental.

— Brenckman, History of Carbon County, Pennsylvania (1884)

White and Hazard found a wide divergence of opinion on whether the Lehigh River could be tamed, and even fewer believed that the mining of coal from the Lehigh River's surrounding lands was feasible. On three separate occasions, funds were raised to improve the Lehigh River's functionality. By 1820, the two companies had a marginal level of navigability on the Lehigh over four years ahead of their targeted 1824 deadline. Coal was transported by mule track from Summit Hill to a loading chute at the huge slack water pool at Mauch Chunk.

Riding this success, the two companies were merged into the Lehigh Coal & Navigation Company, which resolved to apply American Canal era technology, including canals, locks, and rails to bring coal to their foundries and the stoves and furnaces of Philadelphia and beyond.

On March 20, 1818, the company was granted various powers they sought to secure navigation in the Lehigh River, including with boats loaded with one hundred barrels, or ten tons on coal. Pennsylvania's state government kept an eye on the operation, however, and a minority felt the two men might succeed. The state reserved the right to compel the adoption of a complete system of slack-water navigation from Easton to Stoddartsville if the company did not succeed satisfactorily.

Capital was subscribed by a patriotic public on condition that a committee of stockholders go over the Lehigh River ground and pass judgment on the probable success of the effort. The report was favorable so far as the improvement of the Lehigh River was concerned. But the nine-mile road from the river to the mines was unanimously voted impracticable. "To give you an idea of the country over which the road is to pass," wrote one of the commissioners, "I need only tell you that I considered it quite an easement when the wheel of my carriage struck a stump instead of a stone." The public, meanwhile, was divided. Some held that the attempt to operate the coal mine was farcical, but that the improvement of the Lehigh River was an undertaking of great value and would prove profitable to investors. Others were just as positive that improvement's to the river's navigation would follow the fate of so many similar enterprises but that a fortune was in store for those who invested in the Lehigh mines.

The direct result of the examiners' report and of the public debate ultimately was the organization of the first interlocking companies in American commercial history. The Lehigh Navigation Company was formed with a capital stock of $150,000 and the Lehigh Coal Company was launched with capital stock of $55,000. This formed one of the most striking illustrations in American history of the dependence of a commercial venture upon methods of inland transportation. The Lehigh Navigation Company proceeded to build its dams and walls while the Lehigh Coal Company constructed the first roadway in America built on the principle, which was later adopted by the railway, of dividing the total distance by the total descent in order to determine the grade. The Lehigh Navigation Company, then suffering from an unprecedented dearth of water, adopted White's invention of sluice gates connecting with pools that could be filled with reserve water to be drawn upon as needed for navigation.

By 1819, the depth of water between Mauch Chunk and Easton was obtained. The two companies were immediately amalgamated under the title of the Lehigh Coal and Navigation Company. By 1823, the two companies delivered over two thousand tons of coal to market.

=== Lehigh Navigation Company ===
Having displayed great technological skills by creating the world's first iron wire suspension bridge, which spanned the Schuylkill River at their wire works, White and Hazard schemed with other industrialists to secure a reliable source of anthracite.

To move the coal to market, they entered political negotiations to acquire rights to tame the turbulent and rapids-ridden Lehigh River for navigation. By 1817–18, they had organized the separate Lehigh Navigation Company and had written stock flyers announcing plans to deliver barge loads of coal regularly to Philadelphia by 1824. (Note: The irregular stocks available from the mis-managed 'Lehigh Coal Mine Company' had been one huge problem retarding acceptance of Anthracite as a fuel alternative.) The LCMC had trouble delivering Anthracite to Philadelphia at costs cheaper than imported Bituminous Coal from Britain or Virginia. Their last expedition had been sent out in 1813 during the war & blockade caused bituminous shortages, and by the time five arks were sent down river, three sank, leaving the directors of LCMC disgusted and unwilling to fund more losses.

The company began to prepare plans and surveyed sites, and when the state legislature approved the river work in 1818, immediately hired teams of men and began to install locks, dams, and weirs, including water management gates of their own novel design.

The desired opportunity "to ruin themselves," as one member of the Legislature put it, was granted by an act passed March 20, 1818.

According to a history of the navigations, authored in 1884:

The improvement of the Lehigh was begun at the mouth of the Nesquehoning Creek, during the summer of the year 1818, under the personal supervision of Josiah White. The plan adopted was to contract the channel of the river in the form of a funnel, wherever it was found necessary to raise the water, throwing up the round river-stones into low walls or wing dams, thus providing a regular descending navigation.

It soon became apparent that the carrying out of this plan would not insure sufficient water in seasons of drought to float a loaded ark or boat, and the success of the whole enterprise hung in the balance. White resorted to the expedient of creating artificial freshets. Dams were constructed in Mauch Chunk in present-day Jim Thorpe, and sluice gates of a fairly new design, invented for the purpose by White, were used so water could be retained until required for use.

When the dam became full and the water ran over it long enough for the river below to regain its ordinary depth, the sluice ates were let down, while the boats, which were lying in the pool above, passed down with the artificial flood. In this manner the difficulty was overcome. Crews were sent up Mount Pisgah to improve the mule trails down from the coal deposits at Summit Hill, Pennsylvania, and others to build docks, boat building facilities, and the canal systems head end pool and locks.

— Fred Brenckman, The History of Carbon County Pennsylvania

The canal head end needed a location where barges could be built and timber and coal could be brought into slack water. The challenge was to do it above the gap made by the east end of Mount Pisgah, a hard rock knob that towers 900 feet above the Lehigh River towns Jim Thorpe, formerly Mauch Chunk, to the towns west, and Nesquehoning to its north. Both towns are built into the flanks, the traverses, of the mountain, with flats along the river banks. (A few decades later, railroads would follow the canals.)

Within the next two years, White and Hazard constructed a descending navigation system that used their unique "bear trap" or hydrostatic locks, which allowed the passage of coal boats by means of artificial floods. The coal arrived at the head end from the mines at Summit Hill or down along the steep mule trail from near the headwaters of Panther Creek. It floated down the navigation; at journey's end, the barges were sold as fuel or for Delaware basin transports.

The navigation company began shipping significant quantities of coal by early 1819, ahead of expectations, and attained their goal of regular shipments in 1820.

In 1820, the company was combined with the Lehigh Coal Company with the ouster of George Hauto, but was not rechartered officially until 1822.

By late 1820, four years ahead of their prospectus's targeted schedule, the unfinished but much improved Lehigh Valley watercourse began reliably transporting large amounts of coal to White's mills and Philadelphia. The nearly 370 tons of coal brought to market that year not only salved the winter's fuel shortage but created a temporary glut. After buying out co-founder George Hauto, White and Hazard reworked their lease deal with the Lehigh Coal Mine Company, and merged it with the Lehigh Coal Company, acquiring ownership of its 10,000 acres spanning three parallel valleys in the 14 miles (23 km) from Mauch Chunk to Tamaqua. A few months later, they merged the LCC and the Lehigh Navigation Company. In late 1821, they filed papers to incorporate Lehigh Coal & Lehigh Navigation, which took effect in 1822.

== Non-mining ventures ==
As operations managers of the company from 1822 until 1865, White and Hazard were constantly seeking innovative solutions to increase business and revenues. The vertical integration many economists credit them with inventing would appeal to them as a very natural way to control costs, hence maximize profitability. The two, and the various members of the corporate board often heard of ideas that separately(?) or together needed financial investment which the company would often join as investors, and often end up providing a later critical boost of finishing financing, investing in such ventures directly, or buying out at a later time as subsidiaries as things developed a proof of concept, track record, better promise, or dependency on another business.

=== Blast furnaces ===
From that moment on, anthracite and the canals were of pivotal importance in the industrial development of the United States. Using anthracite as fuel in its production, iron for the first time became plentiful and inexpensive. For a period of thirty years, three decades that shaped the future of the valley, anthracite fueled furnaces throughout the Lehigh Valley produced greater quantities of iron than any other part of the nation.

— Ann Bartholomew & Lance E. Metz, page 5, DELAWARE and LEHIGH CANALS

=== Grand Lehigh Canal-Upper Canal Division ===
The June 6, 1862 flood proved to show a fatal flaw in White's grand dream. The Upper Grand contributed to its own demise in that the dams and locks necessary to allow the coal barges to travel on the river meant that huge pools of water sat at the ready. Once the heavy June rains began, and dams began to be breached, devastating tidal waves of flood water burst dam after dam causing a great flood and loss of life.

John J. Leisenring Jr., then Superintendent of the LCN & Co. estimated that 200 people lost their lives from White Haven down to Lehighton. The state legislature stepped in and prohibited the LCN & Co. from rebuilding.

=== Railroads ===
Primary reference
Heydinger, Earl J. (1964). "Railroads of the Lehigh Coal and Navigation Company: GROUP IX". Railway and Locomotive Historical Society Bulletin. 110 (110). Railway and Locomotive Historical Society: 59–62. JSTOR 43518101.

==== Summit Hill and Mauch Chunk Railroad ====
In 1827, the Company in one massive well organized effort, completely built the 9.2 miles (14.8 km) of America's second railroad using the road bed of the wagon road built in 1818–19 in just a few months — a gravity railroad named the Mauch Chunk and Summit Hill Railroad using wooden sleepers on a gravel substrate (as did most more modern railways) — to bring coal from mines to river more efficiently. The work went quickly since the right-of-way surveyed by White (well before 1818's charter) (Note: Brenckman does not say when White surveyed the mule road, but his accounts make it clear that it was instantly ready for work crews to begin when the enabling legislation was signed in March 1818—work crews were assembled and departed Philadelphia within the week—amusingly several months before legal paperwork forming the corporation was finalized, signed and filed with the office of the Pennsylvania Secretary of State. The LCC formation took place several weeks after work crews were sent out to begin both the Navigation and the road construction projects.) (Note: Another account, unattributable at this moment, details White, Hazard, and Hauto borrowing surveying tools from the Schuylkill Canal resources and spending over a month in the icy waters of the Lehigh in the winter of 1816–1817 (Including Christmas in Weissport?), which they surveyed to its source beyond White Haven. This account may have mentioned returning to stake out a road later in 1817.) ran along the virtually uniform gradient created by grading the original mule trail, work overseen by Hazard in 1818.

During the summer of 1827, a railroad was built from the mines at Summit Hill to Mauch Chunk. With one or two unimportant exceptions, this was the first railroad in the United States. (Note: Brenckman is ignoring that at least three railroads that would become famous were formally chartered in 1826, including the second chartered and second constructed, the 3 mile Granite Railroad in Quincy, Massachusetts. The SH&MC was not even the second chartered in Pennsylvania, that honor goes to the similar coal road from the summits near Carbondale, the Delaware and Hudson Gravity Railroad subsidiary of the Delaware and Hudson Canal inspired by the company's success backed by other Philadelphia businessmen and the granite road.)

It was nine miles in length, and occupied the route of the old wagon road most of the distance.

Summit Hill, lying nearly a thousand feet higher than Mauch Chunk, the cars on the road made this descent by gravity, passing the coal, at their destination to the boats in the river by means of inclined planes and chutes. The whole of this plan was evolved by Josiah White, under whose direction it was consummated in a period of about four months. The rails were of rolled bar-iron, three-eighths of an inch in thickness and an inch and a half in width, laid upon wooden ties, which were kept in place by means of stone ballast.

The loaded cars or wagons, as they were then termed, each having a capacity of approximately one and a half tons, were connected in trains of from six to fourteen, being attended by men who regulated their speed.

Turn-outs were provided at intervals and the empty cars were drawn back to the mines by mules. They descended with the trains in specially constructed cars, affording a novel and rather ludicrous spectacle. (Note: Elsewhere, Brenckman details that special mule cars carrying the animal power component of the system were sent down after, or as the trail car of, the coal consists, providing at least part of the spectacle to which he refers. Throughput was kept up by sending 2–3 runs per day at first, then by round-the-clock operations by lantern headlights until demand outstripped the capability of keeping up. By then with the 1846 experience of engineering the Ashley Planes railways, White devised the Summit Hill & Mauch Chunk Railroad's return cable railroad. This changed the return trip time from about four hours to just 20 minutes, allowing more than twelve times the traffic.)

Thirty minutes was the average time consumed in making the descent, while the weary trip back to the mines required three hours.

— Brenckman, History of Carbon County (1894)

The wagon road to become gravity railroad ran from what later became Summit Hill along the south side of Pisgah Ridge to Mount Pisgah to the canal's loading chute over 200 feet (61 m) above the canal banks, (Note: The lower terminal railyard thus ended in what is today the housing in "Upper Mauch Chunk", ending at Mauch Chunk above the present-day North Avenue. During these same years, it also began converting its descending navigation system into a two-way system.)

==== Room Run Railroad ====
The Room Run Railroad was a short rail line road built by Josiah White from a ravine in the Nesquehoning Valley

=== Non-railroad companies ===
During the winters ending in 1821–1823, the partners learned a lot about icing damage and canal construction to prevent heavy damages by sustaining them, but also learned some damages would be sustained each winter. The need for an injection of new cash to do such repairs in 1821 lead to the company reorganization into the Lehigh Coal & Navigation Company, which also bought out George Hauto's share and left White and Hazard with majority ownership; having injected most additional funding from their own pockets. In 1823 the upper four locks on the Lehigh Navigation from Lehigh Gap to Mauch Chunk were rebuilt as proof of concept test beds with a spacious bi-directional long lock system. White had offered the legislature to build a ship & steam tug capable two way lock canal system from Mauch Chunk down to Philadelphia along the Lehigh and Delaware in 1823, but was rebuffed in 1824, with the promise the state would build the Delaware Canal. Lehigh Coal & Navigation Company had to build coal arks and exhausted thousands of acres of timberlands for the one-time, single use boats, costing the company dearly while the state delayed.

The state rejected this idea also, and in 1827 to build a canal along the Delaware River as part of the state canal system.
It was to link Easton with Bristol, a length of 60 miles (97 km), and would have 24 lift locks to accommodate the elevation differential of 180 feet (55 m).

The state canal was a case of blatant political corruption. Badly designed, and poorly built, with narrow 11 feet (3.4 m) that soon proved to be a serious limitation on boats using both canals, and did not even have provision for an adequate supply of water

— Center for Canal History and Technology, The Delaware and Lehigh Canals

- Delaware Division Canal Company – The State of Pennsylvania had embarrassed itself with a botched canal ditch construction some 60 miles (97 km) the terminuses of the Lehigh Canal from Easton and parallel to the Delaware River to Bristol, a suburb of North Philadelphia. In 1831 after it opened and leaked prodigiously, the commonwealth had to ask Josiah White to step in and repair the new ditch, then, common sense injected, asked the Lehigh Coal & Navigation Company to operate the venture when his fixes enabled it to open in 1834. Consequently, the company spawned the Lehigh Navigation Coal Company subsidiary, which operated both canals into the 1930s. In mid-1832 White's men had repaired the most egregiously leaking sections well enough to begin operations, and the company spun-off the Lehigh Navigation Coal Company the LNC Co., a subsidiary operating company with its own management.

==== Mill Parks ====
Founders White and Hazard were at first, mill and foundry owners acting decisively to secure fuel for their main businesses prior to 1815's application for right-of-way legislation and optioning the sad-sack LCMC operations. In 1814, the partners had actually invested first in the rival Schuylkill Canal where they'd become disgusted with the planning, funding, and lack of commitment by other board members—their concerns take on added weight given the Schuylkill didn't operate until 1823 when the company blazed the way. White's innovative Bear Trap lock-gate and system was based on creating a triggerable artificial flood, depending upon water flow to float the boats past the rapids obstructions. It is little wonder that as he surveyed the Lehigh, he also made note where a water-powered mill could be harnessed, and the legislative act would effectively give the LNC ownership of the entire river. These rights were not released back to Pennsylvania until 1964. (Note: Check 1964 date in The Delaware and Lehigh Canals)

So once 'emergency' improvements on the canal (Note: Lower Canal completed initially in late 1820, there were several places experience in 1821 showed a need for re-engineering. In the Winter of 1821–1822, the system was severely damaged for the first time, taking the LCN's total cash reserves to repair. This situation resulted in directors White and Hazard seeking additional capital funds leading to the dissolution of the LCC and LNC and the incorporation of the Lehigh Coal & Navigation Company.) used its founder's knowledge and experience on the Little Schuylkill River to develop the waterpower sites along its waterways into early industrial parks. By 1840, the Abbott Street area near Lock 47, now part of Hugh Moore Park in Easton, Pennsylvania, employed over 1,000 men in almost a dozen factories. This fostered the industries of Allentown, Bethlehem, and their products and the connection with the Delaware Canal, managed for the state by the company after 1834<ref, the development of the Industrial Revolution of greater Philadelphia.

==== Upper Lehigh Canal ====
With rights of eminent domain granted by the 1837 revisions to the Main Line of Public Works legislation, the 45 miles (72 km) Lower Lehigh Navigation was extended upriver another 39 miles (63 km) through the Upper Lehigh Canal and then through the Lehigh Gorge from Jim Thorpe to White Haven and completed in 1843, giving it the largest carrying capacity of any U.S. canal.

==== Lehigh and Susquehanna Railroad ====
With a unified legislative and executive push, the company spun off a subsidiary to build a railroad connection to the Susquehanna at Pittston just north of Wilkes-Barre over very rough terrain. The multi-modal project used a cable railroad called the Ashley Planes, and double-tracked connecting trackage from its foot at Ashley to the barge docks of Pittston and eventually linked up with the seven first-class railroads that drove spurs into the valley to haul anthracite. The Ashley Planes summit end connected to an assembly yard at Mountain Top, Pennsylvania, and sourced a steep double-tracked rail branch to White Haven where it had loading docks with a meeting of transport technologies feeding a new extension of its Lehigh Canal through the difficult terrain of the Lehigh Gorge. With the political push to connect Philadelphia and the Delaware River to the Northern Coal Fields in the Wyoming Valley and the Susquehanna River, the company formed the Lehigh and Susquehanna Railroad empowered with rights of eminent domain. Eventually, both the LC&N Company's Lehigh Navigation and the L&SRR were extended upriver through the Lehigh Gorge from Jim Thorpe to White Haven.

==== Other railroads ====
By the later 1820s through the mid-1830s, the civic and business leaders in Pennsylvania, Delaware, and South Jersey were anxious to connect their young factories with the markets of the trans-Appalachian territories being settled by tens of thousands of westward migrants. To compete with the B&O Railroad and Erie Canal, they launched the Main Line of Public Works to benefit the manufacturers of the Delaware Valley region.

The company built a succession of small but influential short line railways as joint ventures with other investors, each of which concurrently solved an earlier irrealizable and intractable civil construction project. Ownership and operations of all these, as well as their initial railway, the Mauch Chunk & Summit Hill Railway, were ultimately combined under the umbrella of their second, the Lehigh and Susquehanna Railroad (Today, this is a holding company that owns and leases the trackage rights to more visible operating road companies for many important rail corridors in northeast Pennsylvania.)

Subsidiary shortlines

- Nesquehoning & Mahanoy Railroad: Having gained civil engineering experience running a freight line through most of the length of the Lehigh River and across the Delaware River, the company chafed at the transport bottleneck of the Panther Creek Valley. With the increasing power of locomotives, the company surveyed and pushed a seven-mile grade up through the winding slopes north of the Nesquehoning Ridge, with several descents, connecting near Hazelton, and the wider valleys of Mahanoy Creek, including that at Tamaqua, Pennsylvania, along the Little Schuylkill River near the outlet of Panther Creek. From Tamaqua, tracks also reached along the Schuylkill Valley to feed the industries of Reading, Pennsylvania, and surrounds.
- Panther Creek Railroad: Having reached Tamaqua, the company built the PCR to reach the main coal-bearing lands 5 to 6 miles to the east up the Panther Creek Valley.
- Hauto Tunnel: Shipping large heavy coal consists over the steep gradients of the Nesquehoning shortline was costly, so eventually the company cut a mile-long tunnel through Nesquehoning Ridge into downtown Lansford, Pennsylvania, which became for a time the seat of its corporate headquarters. This gave the company three means of bringing coal from its mines along Pisgah Ridge and Nesquehoning Mountain until it sold the Mauch Chunk Switchback Railway, which was operating mostly as a prime tourist attraction: the world's first roller coaster.

==== Lehigh and New England Railroad ====
The acquisition of the Lehigh and New England Road allowed the company to stop leasing rights to the CNJ and transfer them instead to the new acquisition.

=== Decline ===
In 1932, the Lehigh Navigation was closed after maintenance expenses surpassed operating revenues.

By the middle of the 20th century, Lehigh Coal & Navigation Company, once a widely diversified company, had become largely dependent on coal revenues, while subsidiaries owned the railroads and other more-profitable arms. The softening of demand for coal, as railroads replaced steam locomotives with diesels and other forms of heating came into wider use, cut deeply into corporate profits. Consequently, various boards oversaw gradual contraction of the company and sales of bits and pieces. In 1966, Greenwood Stripping Co. bought the remaining coal properties, most located as originally exploited along the Panther Creek Valley, and sold them eight years later to Bethlehem Mines Corp.

In 1986, shareholders dissolved the company after it sold its last business, Cella's Chocolate Covered Cherries, to Tootsie Roll.

=== New company ===
The company name remained associated with anthracite mining through the independently founded and otherwise unrelated Lehigh Coal and Navigation Company, incorporated in 1988. While unrelated legally, the New Company as it came to be known in the area was spearheaded by a previous officer and stockholder: James J. Curran Jr. took over Lehigh Coal from Bethlehem Mines Corp. in 1989, and through the 1990s it remained the largest producer of anthracite, a specialty product, in the nation.

In 2000, Lehigh Coal shut down and laid-off 163 employees, saying plunging coal prices made it impossible to make a profit. The company reopened in 2001 with help of a last-resort $9 million loan from the U.S. Department of Agriculture. In 2010, in bankruptcy proceedings once again, the company was purchased by one of its bigger creditors at auction, BET Associates, who were affiliated with Toll Brothers. The company properties in between Lansford and Nesquehoning, boasting an EPA permit sign in the same Lehigh Coal and Navigation Company name at the company gates along Rt-209 were observed in operation during mid-July 2013.

== See also ==
- Lehigh Canal
- Lehigh and Susquehanna Railroad
- Panther Creek Valley
- Spider Bridge
