= Stoddartsville Historic District =

Historic district in Pennsylvania, United States

- U.S. National Register of Historic Places
- U.S. Historic district
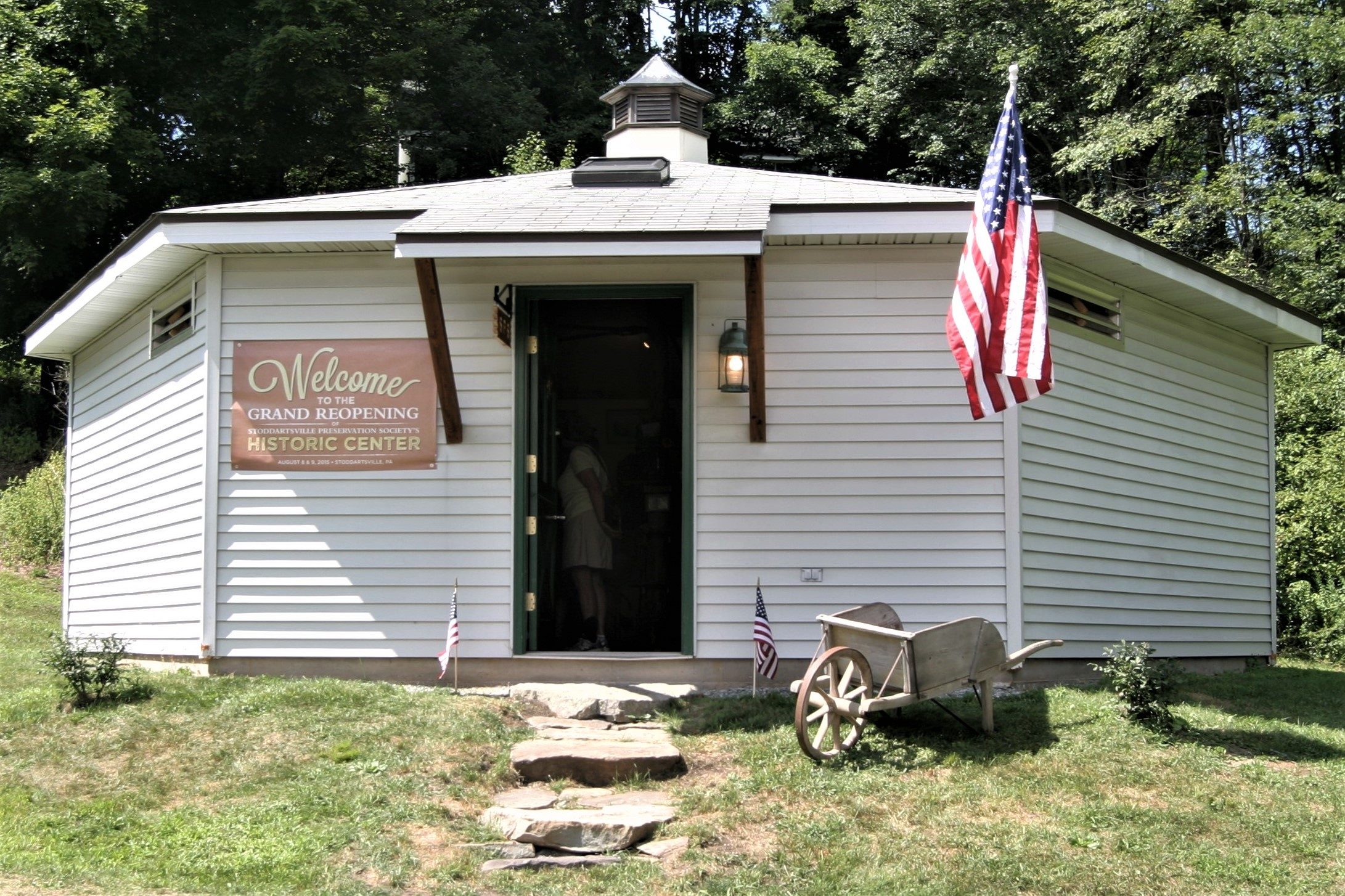
- Stoddartsville Historic Center

- Location within Pennsylvania Location within the United States
- Location: S side of PA 115 at Lehigh River, Buck Township, Pennsylvania
- Coordinates: 41°07′47″N 75°37′42″W
- Area: 180 acres (73 ha)
- Built: 1815
- Built by: John Stoddart (1777-1857)
- Architectural style: Georgian, Colonial Revival, Federal
- Website: https://www.stoddartsville.com/ https://www.stoddartsvillepreservationsociety.com/
- NRHP reference No.: 98001373
- Added to NRHP: November 12, 1998

The Stoddartsville Historic District is a national historic district that is located in Buck Township, Luzerne County, Pennsylvania.

It was added to the National Register of Historic Places in 1998.

== Architectural features ==
This district includes thirty-six contributing buildings, fourteen contributing sites, and one contributing structure that are located in the nineteenth-century milling and transportation center of Stoddartsville. It includes houses and summer cottages, outbuildings and wells, and the remains of mills and mill races, barn ruins, and the ruins of "bear trap locks" and wing dams.

Notable contributing resources include the remains of Stoddart's Grist Mill and related archaeological sites, the remains of Stoddart's Saw Mill (1815), the "Appleyard" house (c. 1815), the "Miller's House" (1890-1893), the Inn (c. 1875), and the Stoddart House or "The Maples" (c. 1810).

== History ==
Stoddartsville was founded by John Stoddart in 1815, who partnered with Josiah White (of the Lehigh Coal and Navigation Co.) to improve navigation on the Lehigh River. Stoddart imagined a canal town with mills, shops, taverns and homes. The dams only allowed for a one-way canal, which was not ideal because arriving barges would need to be broken up and sold. As the mining industry in Luzerne County grew, two-way canals became an option, and Stoddart had hoped to extend a two-way canal by 12 miles from White Haven to Stoddartsville, but plans were abandoned when the estimated cost for such expansion to the Lehigh Coal and Navigation Company was deemed too great. Over the years, the town became a vacation community filled with cottages.

Stoddartsville saw its share of misfortune, from floods in 1862 and fires in the 1950s. With the growth of resorts in the Pocono Mountains, visitors to Stoddartsville waned and it became a private, residential area.

== Preservation ==
Through the efforts of John L. Butler Jr., the village of Stoddartsville was placed on the National Register of Historic Places on November 12, 1998. As direct descendants of John Stoddart, the Butler family has had close ties to Stoddartsville for generations. During his lifetime, John Butler Jr. amassed a collection of artifacts, photographs, and documentation of the village. In 2001, John and Haney Butler began construction of a Historic Center and hosted tours to share the history of Stoddartsville. Mr. Butler retained ownership of the Historic Center and Stoddartsville Cemetery until his death in August 2010, shortly after the founding of the Stoddartsville Preservation Society Inc. (SPS). The SPS acquired both properties in 2011 and continues to hold tours and meetings with a mission to preserve Stoddartsville and carry on his legacy. The Historic Center is open for visitors on the first Saturday during the months of May through October, or by appointment.

As of Spring 2024, 288 cemetery burials have been extensively documented by the Stoddartsville Preservation Society.
