= Switchback Railroad Trail =

Rail trail in Pennsylvania, United States

A map of Switchback Railroad Trail in Jim Thorpe, Pennsylvania

The Lehigh Switchback Rail-Trail is a rail trail in Jim Thorpe, Pennsylvania. It has been named a national recreation trail.

The trail surface is natural, consisting of dirt, roots, rocks, and occasional coal chunks. The trail runs downhill on the former right-of-way of the Mauch Chunk Switchback Railway from Summit Hill to Jim Thorpe. Located midway on the trail is Mauch Chunk Lake Park which provides parking for hiking & biking up and down the trail.

Several bicycle outfitters in the area provide bike rental and shuttle services to the top of Summit Hill that allows riders to enjoy a 100% downhill ride to the town of Jim Thorpe.
