= Gravity railroad =

Railroad on a slope

A gravity railroad (American English) or gravity railway (British English) is a railroad on a slope that allows cars carrying minerals or passengers to coast down the slope by the force of gravity alone. The speed of the cars is controlled by a braking mechanism on one or more cars on the train. The cars are then hauled back up the slope using animal power, a locomotive or a stationary engine and a cable, a chain or one or more wide, flat iron bands. A much later example in California used 4 ft 8 1/2 in (1,435 mm) standard gauge steam engines to pull gravity cars back to the summit of Mt. Tamalpais.

The typical amusement park roller coaster is designed from gravity railroad technology based on the looping track incorporated into the second railroad of the United States, the Mauch Chunk and Summit Hill Railroad, which remained in operation for decades as a tourist ride after it was withdrawn from freight service hauling coal.

A variation is the railway gravity yard or hump yard. This is a goods yard incorporating a "hump" gradient: it allows a single goods train to be taken slowly over the hump, with the wagons sequentially detached and allowed to roll downhill into an array of different sidings: timely operation of the railway points chooses which siding each wagon ends up in. This allows a single train to be speedily disassembled and the wagons sorted into new goods trains, without the need of a shunting engine.

In a further variation, a slip car or slip coach was a section of coaches at the end of a train that had a different destination to the main train: these rear carriages could be uncoupled at speed, diverted onto a different set of tracks by operating the railway's points, and would then proceed to their separate destination, using a combination of gravity and momentum, without a locomotive, and controlled by the brakes operated by the guard in the rear guards van.

== Types of gravity railroad ==
=== Switchback gravity railroad ===
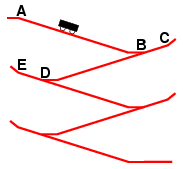
Switchbacked incline

The term "switchback gravity railroad" is sometimes applied to gravity railroads that used special self-acting (momentum-driven) Y-shaped switches known as switchbacks to automatically reverse a car's direction at certain points as it descends; this essentially folds the incline across the slope in a characteristic "zig-zag" shape. (See diagram: car starts from point A, coasts through switch at B, and comes to a stop at C. Car then rolls through the switch again and proceeds to the switch at D, where the process is repeated.) A separate track was typically used to haul the empty cars back to the top.

The original implementation of this type of system is credited to the Mauch Chunk Switchback Railway, which hauled coal and passengers from 1827 until 1933. This was very popular with tourists, and contributed to the development of the roller coaster.

== Examples ==
=== Italy ===
The Modena-Sassuolo railway was opened on 1 April 1883, and was also known as the "trenèin dal còcc" in the Modenese dialect. Trains departing from Sassuolo ran down the shallow and even gradient to Modena, running at up to 30 km/h (19 mph) under gravity. They were hauled back to the summit by steam locomotives.

=== United Kingdom and Crown dependencies ===
The Ffestiniog Railway in Gwynedd, northwest Wales, was built in 1832 to carry slate from quarries high in the hills to the sea at Porthmadog. The line was laid out for the wagons to descend by gravity, while horses were originally used to haul the empty wagons up the hill. On the downward journey, the horses were carried in a dandy waggon at the rear of the train. Later on, steam haulage was adopted. This narrow gauge railway is still operational but all passenger trains are now locomotive-hauled.

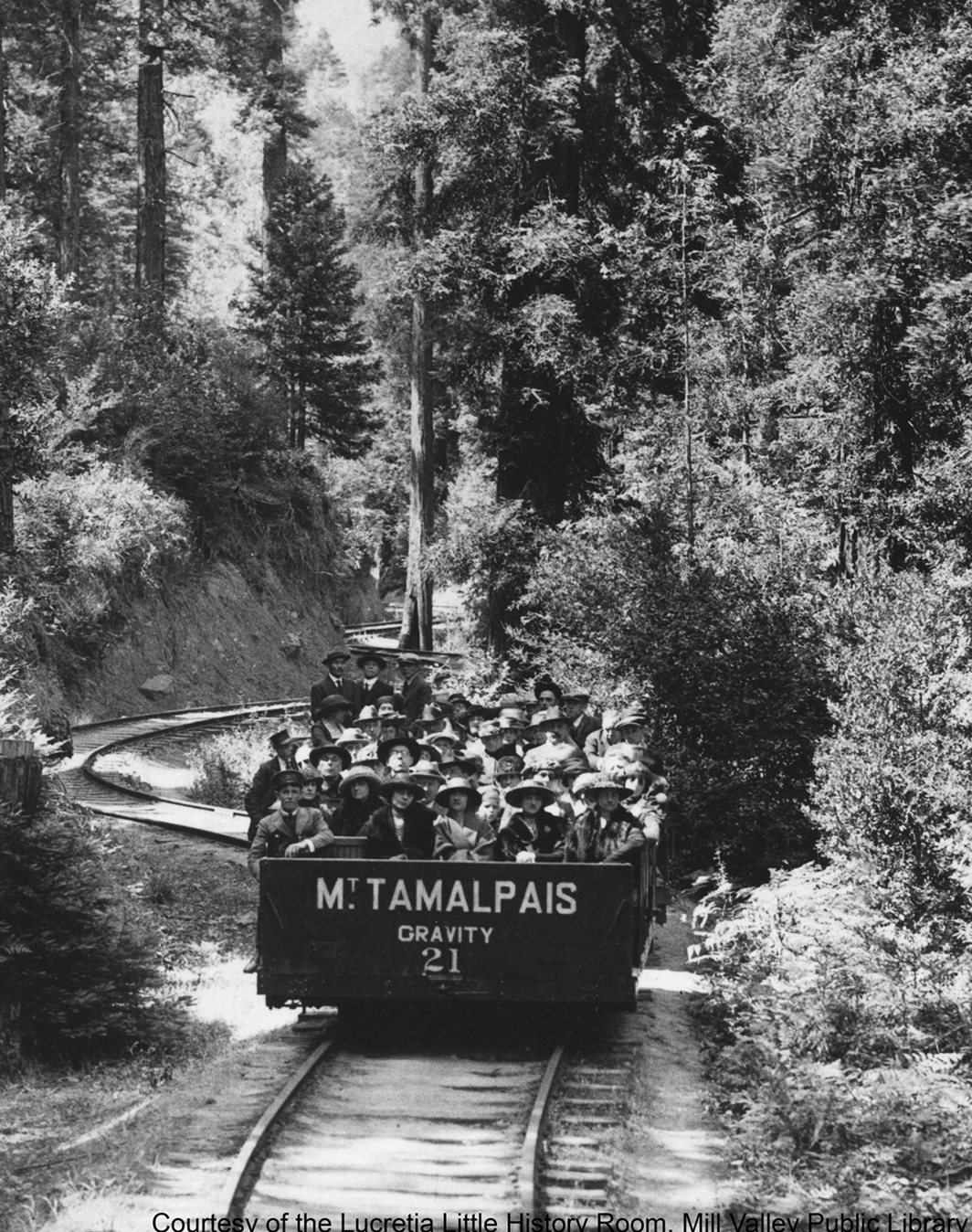
Gravity car number 21 on the Mount Tamalpais and Muir Woods Railway, circa 1915

Demonstration gravity trains are still occasionally run using original wagons – up to 50 at a time.

At the Manx Electric Railway's Ramsey railway station, which is a terminus on a slight downward incline, the run-around of the driving motor car around the trailer car is regularly done with the assistance of gravity. However, no passengers are carried during this operation.

=== United States ===
In the United States, The Delaware and Hudson Canal Company operated an extensive gravity railroad system from 1828 until 1898. With 22 separate lift planes, the 55-mile (89 km) line was purchased in 1886 by the recently constructed Shohola Glen Summer Resort (1882) and used until 1907.

Due to the success and advancement of the gravity railroads, a second gravity operation at Hawley and Pittston was created in 1850. This 47-mile (76 km) route from Port Griffith (Pittston) to Paupack Eddy (Hawley) allowed Pennsylvania Coal Company to directly ship anthracite from its Northern Coal Field mines in the Wyoming Valley to Delaware and Hudson Canal and ultimately to the New York markets.

The Ontario and San Antonio Heights Railroad Company was a railway in Ontario, California which operated with a unique gravity mule car. Mules provided the propulsion on the uphill segment, and a pull-out trailer allowed the mules to ride along for the gravity-powered downhill return. Mule cars operated from 1887 to 1895 when the line was electrified.

From 1896 through 1929, steam trains carried passengers up Mount Tamalpais in Marin County, California. In 1902, gravity cars began carrying passengers from the mountain's summit down the 8-mile (13 km) twisting single-track railway to the city of Mill Valley and starting in 1907, the first tourists into Muir Woods. Gravity service supplemented the steam train service. The powerful Shay and Heisler geared steam engines of the Mount Tamalpais and Muir Woods Railway then towed the gravity cars back to the summit for the next scheduled run. "Gravities" were kept to a strict speed limit of 12 miles per hour (19 km/h).

On May 3, 2009, the Gravity Car Barn Museum opened at the east peak of Mount Tamalpais to display this novel form of transportation. There, a recreated gravity car rolls on eighty-four feet (25.6 m) of track.

== Other inclined railroads ==
Funiculars, self-acting inclines and rack railways, though similar, are often excluded technically from the term "gravity railroad" due to their use of propulsion means other than gravity alone.

== See also ==
- Lynton and Lynmouth Cliff Railway
- Gravity train
