= Josiah White =

Pennsylvania industrialist (1781–1850)

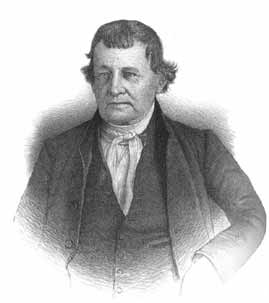
A 19th century illustration of White

Josiah White (1781–1850) was a Pennsylvania industrialist and key figure in the American Industrial Revolution.

== Career ==
=== Pennsylvania navigation development ===
White began early factory-centered mill production in 1808 in water powered ironworks near Philadelphia, along with his partner, Erskine Hazard, when they quickly found their first mill at East Falls, Pennsylvania, to be much too small. They then built a more elaborate and larger mill nearby to refine pig iron and produce cast iron artifacts and roll wrought bar iron goods, including nails and wire. The pair were especially influential after 1814 in helping the American Industrial Revolution to accelerate its building momentum by agitating for infrastructure investment, sponsoring two key river navigations and the nation's first long railway, and then after initial success, increasingly supplying an expanding part of the country's overall energy needs including that of other industrialists at a time when there occurred the prolonged first energy crisis in the brief history of the country, where the surviving forests were remote from population centers through over-logging, charcoal and imported coal were increasing in price rapidly, and fire wood was growing dearly expensive.

White was a mill owner, and early pioneer in the advancement of civil engineering, mining, iron production, water transport. and railroad development, boat and barge shipping & construction. An innovative open-minded pragmatist, most of all in response to the energy crises in the early 19th century, his focus from 1815 on was mostly about the mining, and delivery of anthracite coal to others for their manufacturing and domestic heating needs in everyday life. Having taken over an 1808 speculative charter to build locks and mill races along the Schuylkill River's falls, which today is the shoreline along the East Falls region of Philadelphia. Historian Charles V. Hagner wrote that, "Erskine Hazard was the partner of Josiah White in the iron and wire business; in the, erection of the locks and mill-seats he had, another partner, Joseph Gillingham. They finished the locks and canal on the western side of, the river and two mills were built there — one a sawmill, the other for making white lead." These were in addition to the two main mills of White and Hazard, which were on the east or left bank.

During the War of 1812, he succeeded in the effort to find a way to ignite and burn anthracite coal. (Note: The historical society writing 'The Delaware and Lehigh Canals' re-relates the amusing tale also found verbatim in Hagner — that long exhaustive attempts to burn anthracite had gone poorly all day long after much experimentation, so an upset employee slammed the door shutting the last batch into a furnace and left with the whole crew. From another source, it is suggested the group went to a nearby pub, probably for a meal. Within a half-hour a worker returning for his forgotten coat discovered the furnace glowing red hot, having been given a proper draft behind the closed door. Summoning the departed crew, the work group was able to run three batches of iron into the rolling mill making unheard of production before the heat of the furnace needed replenished)

Along with partner Erskine Hazard, White helped found numerous companies. Most were either mining operations or transportation enterprises to establish a better infrastructure for coal, people, and other industrial materials needs (ores, timber, and finished goods) in the Schuylkill Valley, the Lehigh Valley, the Delaware Valley, and Wyoming Valley regions. Having commissioned anthracite shipment by mule train from up the Schuylkill, in 1815 White and Hazard started the Lehigh Canal machinations as commissioners, but were not selected by investors to become the operations managers elected to work out ways and means.

The managers selected a slow plodding approach with which the partners quarreled, championing instead a means to deliver coal down river much more quickly using temporary dams and artificial freshets in order to produce revenue from one way traffic delivering coal. This method was rejected by the managers, resulting in the belated first deliveries of coal on the Schuylkill Canal only in 1823, while their method delivered record amount of 365 long-tons of anthracite coal down the Lehigh Canal to Philadelphia in December 1820, four years ahead of promises. Their Lehigh Coal and Navigation Companies are credited with being the earliest known example of vertical integration, the companies each sourcing at least part of the needs of the next domino in the chain.

White experimented with a succession of fireplace and furnace grates until he created artifacts allowing stone coal to replace expensive firewood for heating. In 1818 White's wire works built the first (temporary) wire suspension bridge 120 metres (400 ft) over the Falls of the Schuylkill using trees and tall buildings near the river to string catenary cables from which a board walk was suspended attached by wires. In the 1820s White and Hazard experimented with blast furnace production of smelted pig iron using charges of anthracite in Mauch Chunk in present-day Jim Thorpe, Pennsylvania, and succeeded in part, perhaps as much as any in the United States, for their processes could not always reliably repeat, so were not commercially viable in the long run.

This primed them to import skills and necessary equipment when news of successful use of anthracite pig iron processes arrived from Wales in 1838; subsequently he invested heavily and had, as the operating manager, had the Lehigh Coal & Navigation Company invest in the Lehigh Crane Iron Company backing the importing of professional talent from Wales to establish the first sustainably-successful blast furnaces of the region in Catasauqua, (Note: High Tech Furnaces, came first in Catasauqua, then the more famous nearby Allentown and Bethlehem, all long before Pittsburgh.) and established the first wire rope factory in the United States in Mauch Chunk, which enabled Ashley Planes and up cable railway conversion and expansion of Mauch Chunk Switchback Railway.

=== Lehigh Coal Company and Lehigh Navigation Company ===
In 1814, White and Hazard acquired the last two punts that the Lehigh Coal Mine Company (LCMC) managed to pole downriver to Philadelphia, after losing more boats than successfully reached the docks. The losses represented the disappointing outcome of more than a year of work by the party sent out the previous year to build boats and mine coal for shipment.They soon learned the LCMC was not intending to send out other expeditions, being of a mind they'd lost sufficient money, so White and Hazard felt the companies rights could be leased and set out to examine Lehigh's course, and tour the mine site along Pisgah Ridge to examine why both mining and delivery of coal was supposedly so difficult.

They concluded the surface outcrops at the mine located in what today is Summit Hill, Pennsylvania would be easy to mine with the proper digging tools capable of breaking the hard mineral. Examination of the mountainous terrain back towards the Lehigh, they conceived a wagon road which descended steadily to a point above the river, so loading of boats could be done by chute. Lastly, they concluded the necessary river depth could be achieved for a safe down descent by employing a quasi-lock gate that sprang to mind as he examined the situations. In the event, they returned home filled with enthusiasm convinced that good management could achieve a regular supply of coal to customers in Philadelphia. In short order they obtained an option on leasing the mining and other rights held by the despondent owners of the LCMC, and began activities promoting the venture.

No sooner had White, Hazard, and Hauto obtained a lease of the coal lands in what is now Mauch Chunk than they applied to the Legislature for an act authorizing them to improve the navigation of the river. They stated in the petition their object of getting coal to market, and that they had a plan for the cheap improvement of the river navigation, which they hoped would serve as a model for the improvement of many other streams in the State. Their project was considered chimerical, the improvement of the Lehigh being deemed impracticable from the failure of the various companies who had undertaken it under previous laws. The act of March 20, 1818, incorporating the Lehigh Navigation and Coal Company, "gave these gentlemen the opportunity of ruining themselves, since many members of the Legislature predicted would be the result of their undertaking." The various powers applied for and granted in the act embraced the whole scope of tried and untried methods of effecting the object of getting "a navigation downward once in three days for boats loaded with one hundred barrels, or ten tons," with the reservation on the part of the Legislature of the right to compel the adoption of a complete slack-water navigation from Easton to Stoddartsville. Knowing the bill was coming up in the spring of 1818, the partners had contractors and hires prepped and ready...

Erskine Hazard-founding partners of the Lehigh Coal Company, the Lehigh Navigation Company, Ashley Planes, the Lehigh Canal, Lehigh and Susquehanna Railroad, Lehigh Coal & Navigation Company, Mauch Chunk Switchback Railway, and the Lehigh and Susquehanna Railroad.

=== White's Manual Labor Institute ===
A boarding school was established by the Society of Friends in the state of Indiana through a bequest at White's death in 1850. It opened in 1861 as a mixed-race boarding school, intending to "take boys and girls without distinction of color" and educate them on spiritual and vocational matters. Two decades after opening the institute, the Society of Friends "decided to undertake some special Indian Educational work on contract for the Government" in 1882. By 1886, White's Institute had become a fully-fledged American Indian Boarding School, with a representative of the Society of Friends referring to it as such. Among the graduates of this school was Zitkala-Ša in 1887.

=== Other companies ===
White also was a founder of Beaver Meadow Railroad and Coal Company, which began producing coal in 1813. The company was the first to employ steam locomotives, which were used throughout the Lehigh Valley region of eastern Pennsylvania.
