= Ashley Planes =

- U.S. National Register of Historic Places
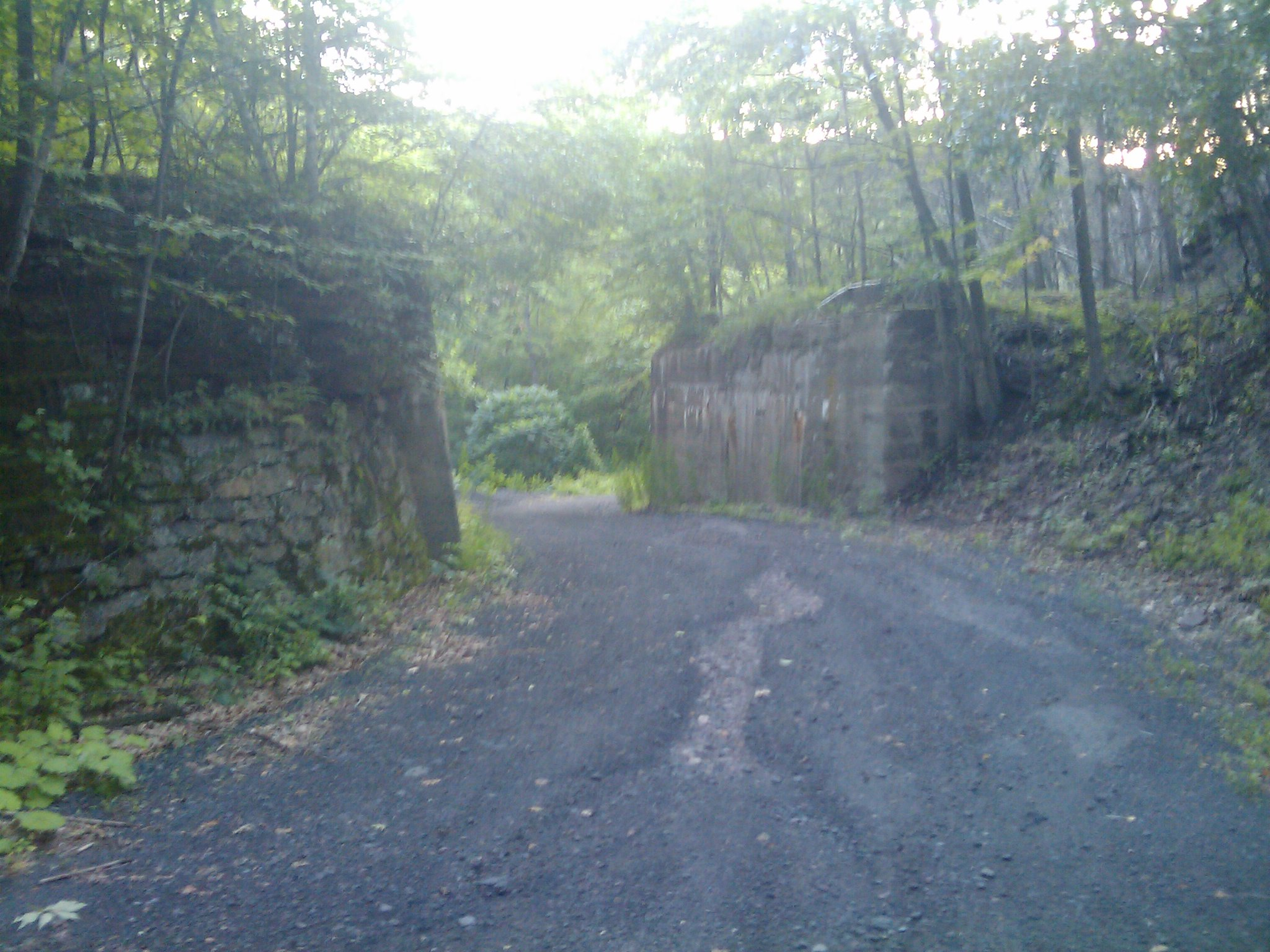
- Abutments from the Ashley Planes in 2009

- Location within Pennsylvania Location within the United States
- Location: Off Pennsylvania Route 309 in Fairview Township and Hanover Township, Pennsylvania
- Coordinates: 41°11′26″N 75°54′37″W
- Area: 160.3 acres (64.9 ha)
- Built: 1837, 1860s, 1909
- Built by: Douglas, Edwin A.; LC&N.
- NRHP reference No.: 80003562
- Added to NRHP: January 25, 1980

Ashley Planes was a historic freight cable railroad in Luzerne County, Pennsylvania. They consisted of three separately powered inclined-plane sections between Ashley, Pennsylvania, at the foot, and via the Solomon cutting the yard in Mountain Top more than 1,000 feet (300 m) higher. They were built in 1837 and 1838 by the Lehigh and Susquehanna Railroad (L&S), a subsidiary of the Lehigh Coal & Navigation Company.

== History ==
In the 1830s, Eastern business interests sought better connections to rapidly growing Midwestern territories. They also sought better ways to bring coal from the Coal Region of Northeastern Pennsylvania, which could only be hauled by pack mule overland, or only through long and arduous routes down the Susquehanna River and thence to Philadelphia.

The 1837 updates to the 1824 Main Line of Public Works legislation prescribed the Ashley Planes to move anthracite coal from the Wyoming Valley eastward over the ridge to the Lehigh Valley, where it could descend by gravity to the canal head and continue by water to Philadelphia, other Atlantic seaports, and export markets.

Located near Wilkes-Barre, the Planes would join two railroad sections and bridge the drainage divide between the Susquehanna Valley and that of the Lehigh and Delaware Valleys. It was built to join the freight capacity of two canals, the Pennsylvania Canal system, locally the West Susquehanna Division at Pittston, and an extension of the Lehigh Canal.

The Planes linked Pittsburgh, the Ohio River, and the Midwest to the eastern coastal cities via Pennsylvania's canal system and later, other railroads, the shortest path at the time. The Planes sent goods and passengers west and via Mountain Top by rail to White Haven.

The incline railroads were located at Fairview Township and Hanover Township. Before and after loading, coal hoppers would be staged from the Central Railroad of New Jersey's (CNJ) Mountain Top Yard, which was leased from LH&S from the 1870s in nearby Mountain Top, Pennsylvania. The three railroads were built in 1837, the 1860s, and 1909, and feature a stationary power source using cable winding and winching and cars traveling down as a counterweight to a car being lifted on parallel tracks.

It was added to the National Register of Historic Places in 1980.

== Operations ==
The thousand-foot lift of the cable railway was not continuous. The initial two and later three sections of the Ashley Planes railroad could operate as a funicular railroad (Note: Funicular operation requires a down load counterbalances the up load. This was a freight railway servicing primarily one way traffic. While some freight descended from Mountain Top, this was a rare occurrence compared to the hundreds of hopper cars that ascended daily.) or a cable railroad, for its hoist houses all used a pusher cart called a "barney" hooked into a continuous cable in the same way as a modern ski lift uses a continuous cable.

Like a ski lift, the railway was operated from a standing engine by an operator in control of a winch, clutch and brake. A helper spotted cars below a short local drop to an area upslope of the 'barney house', where the cable and pusher cart would drop into one end (heading down) and rise out of the other to engage the freight cars and push them upwards. The axle on the barneys telescoped so that at the barney house entrance the barney's wheels slide inside and dropped under the plane of the standard width railroad tracks so the barney could slide away and let gravity take the consist onto the marshaling yard. When using funicular action, as it did sending returns down during its early years the rails split connecting two pairs of tracks bulging out in a vase-like shape in a passing area, so the railway could ship freight downhill east to west as well as the heavy operations west to east which predominated until its closing. In the earliest years of operation, there was no back track to return cars to the bottom for refilling, and they had to be returned on the Planes, thus slowing and complicating the lift operations.

When stopping cars from rolling free the barneys had to be positioned below the cars. Because the upsides are uphill from the barney house opening, a latch brake held a string of empties above the barney before it emerged from its tunnel. The barney then moved downhill and away from the latched cars. This acceleration caused the latched cars to collide into the barneys with considerable force; a jerking motion which was in turn transmitted down the entire cable system. It was thus easier to lift cars waiting at a latch for a barney than it was to drop cars down safely onto a moving barney.

In the 1860s, the LH&S completed tracks along the right bank of the Lehigh through the Lehigh Gorge to the community of Mauch Chunk, now Jim Thorpe, and its trackage to the Delaware Valley, especially the Delaware Canal to Philadelphia markets and rail connections at Easton via the industrial centers of Allentown and Bethlehem, Pennsylvania. These inclined plane railbeds were used for the transportation of anthracite coal. The railroads were in use until 1948.

== See also ==
- Lehigh Coal and Navigation Company Records in Beyond Steel: An Archive of Lehigh Valley Industry and Culture.
- Early Mining Pictures – Anthracite Mining pictorial: Mines & Structures operated by the L.C.& N., Summit Hill, Lansford and Coaldale, Pennsylvania—the heartland of the company that designed, built and ran the Planes until the 1930s.
- Switch-Back Gravity Railroad: Proprietary photos touring the LC&N built Summit Hill & Mauch Chunk Railroad, the 2nd railway in North America—and the cable railroad which antedated the completion of the Ashley Planes with very nearly the same design and technologies. Due to its many years as a tourist attraction, the photo history of the older railway is far more complete.
- List of funicular railways
