= Lehigh and Susquehanna Railroad =

Defunct railroad which operated in the state of Pennsylvania

- A map of Northeastern Pennsylvania with the Lehigh and Susquehanna Railroad highlighted in red

Overview
- Locale: Northeastern Pennsylvania, U.S.
- Dates of operation: 1837–1976
- Successor: Conrail

Technical
- Track gauge: 4 ft 8 1/2 in (1,435 mm)

The Lehigh and Susquehanna Railroad is a defunct railroad that operated in eastern Pennsylvania during the 19th and 20th centuries. The company was a subsidiary of the Lehigh Coal & Navigation Company (LC&N). For much of its lifetime, however, it was leased by the Central Railroad of New Jersey.

The company was founded in 1837 for the objective of transporting predominantly anthracite coal from the North Branch Division of the Pennsylvania Canal to the Lehigh Canal on the Lehigh River. The rail line was later extended to the confluence of the Lehigh and Delaware rivers in Easton, Pennsylvania.

In 1976, the company was sold to Conrail.

== History ==
=== 19th century ===
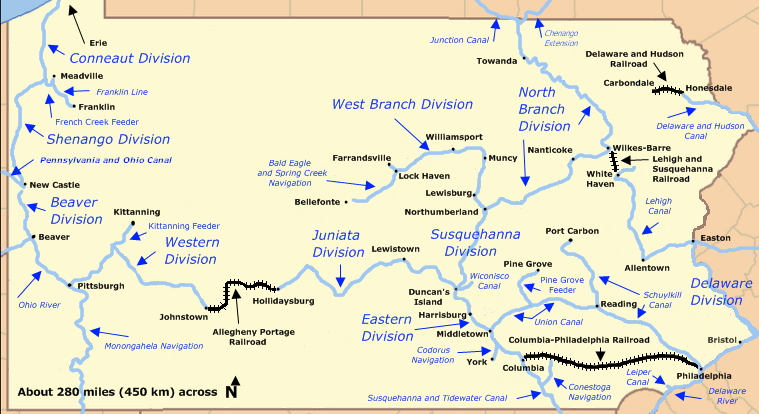
The Lehigh and Susquehanna Railroad connected Pennsylvania's Main Line of Public Works, allowing manufactured and bulk goods, especially anthracite coal, to be shipped between the Delaware and Susquehanna valleys

The Lehigh and Susquehanna Railroad was chartered on March 31, 1837. It was created to link the North Branch Division of the Pennsylvania Canal at Wilkes-Barre and the Lehigh Canal at White Haven. Construction of the railroad began in 1839 and was completed in 1841. The arduous 19.58-mile (31.51 km) route required the construction of a tunnel and three inclined planes, including the Ashley Planes.

In 1862, flooding damaged the Lehigh Canal north of Mauch Chunk in present-day Jim Thorpe. The LC&N received permission to extend the L&S south from White Haven to Easton, on the Delaware River. Regular passenger service to Easton began on February 3, 1868. New bridges over the Lehigh and Delaware Rivers on March 16 completed the line into Phillipsburg, New Jersey, with connections to the Belvidere Delaware Railroad, Central Railroad of New Jersey (CNJ), and Morris and Essex Railroad.

With the completion of the L&S, the Easton-Phillipsburg area of the Lehigh Valley region of eastern Pennsylvania became a major rail hub.

The Lehigh Valley Railroad ran along the south side of the Lehigh River and then across the Delaware. The CNJ and Morris and Essex handled its coal traffic between Easton and New York. The L&S ran parallel to the Lehigh Valley, north of the river. In addition to its connections with the L&S and Lehigh Valley, the CNJ forwarded traffic from the Delaware, Lackawanna and Western Railroad (DL&W) in New Jersey. This complex state of affairs was upset in 1868 when the DL&W leased the Morris and Essex, giving it direct access to the Delaware River and undermining the CNJ's position. The CNJ responded on March 31, 1871, by leasing the L&S. This gave the CNJ direct access to the coal fields in the Wyoming Valley.

=== 20th century ===
In 1963, the Reading Company, which had a controlling interest in the CNJ, purchased the L&S from the LC&N. Under the agreement, the LC&N would continue to receive the lease payments from the CNJ for 35 years, at which point they would revert to the Reading. But the CNJ entered bankruptcy in 1967 and stopped the lease payments. The Lehigh Valley was also in bankruptcy, but took over the CNJ's Pennsylvania operations in 1972, including the lease of the L&S.

The distressed state of railroading in the Northeastern United States, epitomized by the 1970 bankruptcy of Penn Central, led to the passage of the 1973 Regional Rail Reorganization Act. The act transferred the properties of the bankrupt railroads to a new government-owned railroad, Conrail. The L&S was designated for conveyance, although its unique status as a railroad leased from a non-railroad (the LC&N) required special consideration.

In 1976, the L&S was conveyed to Conrail in 1976; Conrail bought the leasehold interest from the LC&N in 1978 for $5.2 million.
