= Mauch Chunk Switchback Railway =

Freight railroad in Pennsylvania

- Mauch Chunk Railroad; Summit Hill & Mauch Chunk Railroad; Mauch Chunk and Summit Hill Switchback Railroad
- U.S. National Register of Historic Places
- Pennsylvania state historical marker
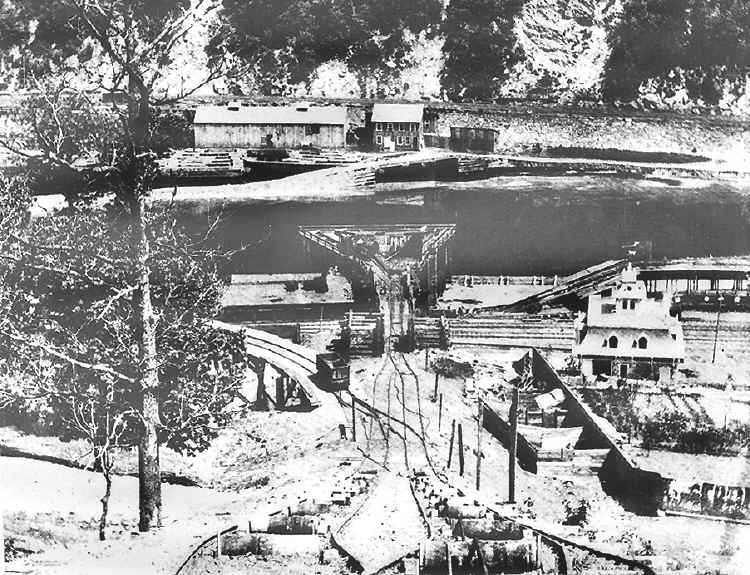
- Looking down on the Lehigh Canal in Jim Thorpe, Pennsylvania, c. 1870

- Location within Pennsylvania Location within the United States
- Location: Between Ludlow St. in Summit Hill and F.A.P. 209 in Jim Thorpe, Pennsylvania, U.S.
- Coordinates: 40°52′10″N 75°44′59″W
- Area: 47 acres (19 ha)
- Built: 1827
- Built by: Lehigh Coal & Navigation Co. (LC&N)
- Architect: Josiah White
- NRHP reference No.: 76001616

Significant dates
- Added to NRHP: June 3, 1976
- Designated PHMC: May 25, 1971

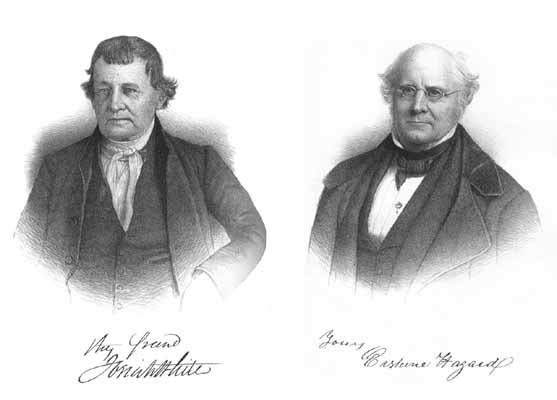
Josiah White and Erskine Hazard-founding partners of the Summit Hill & Mauch Chunk Railroad

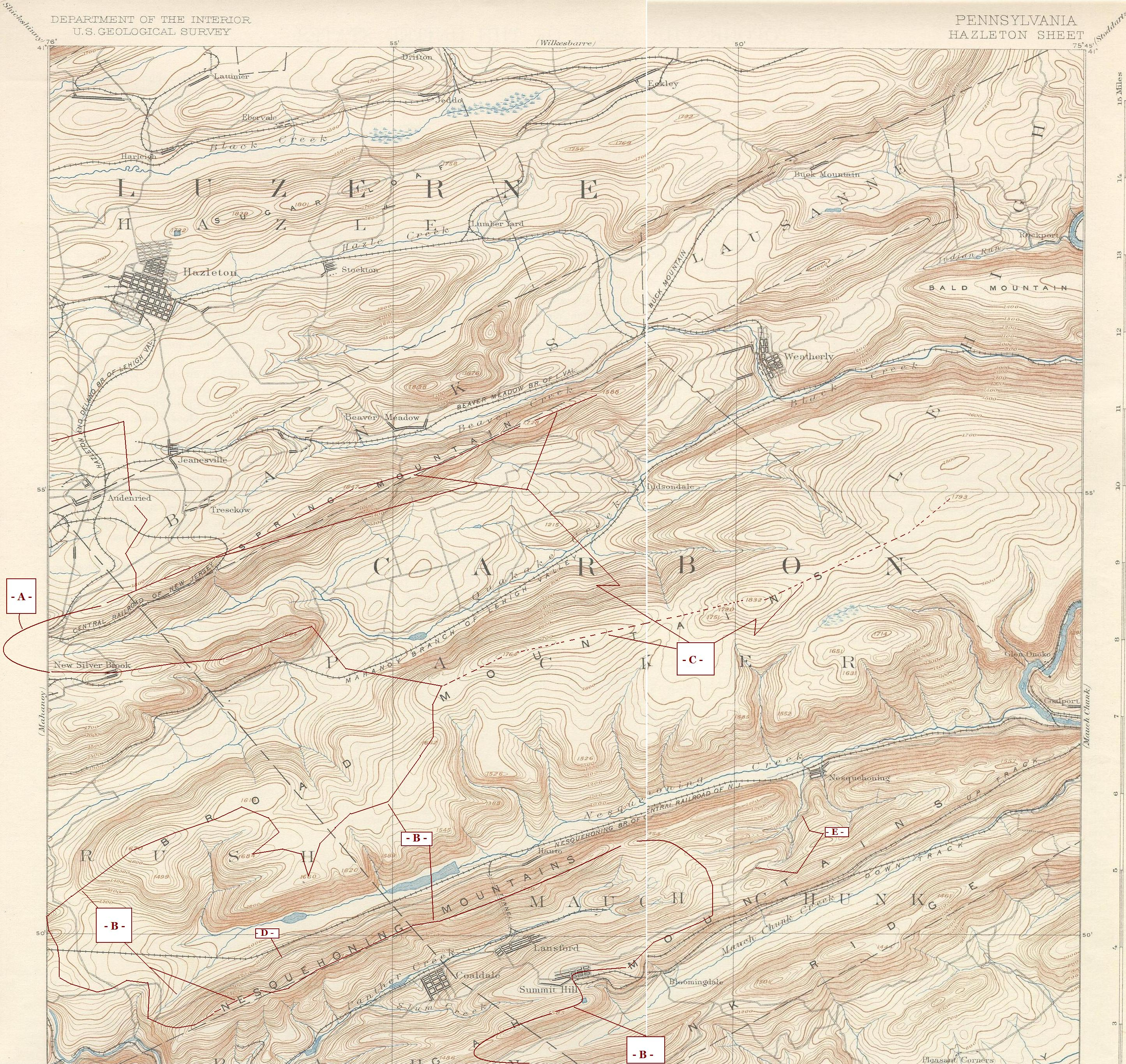
Pisgah Mountain and the topography of the Summit Hill and Mauch Chunk Railroad

The Mauch Chunk Switchback Railway, also known as the Mauch Chunk and Summit Railroad and occasionally shortened to Mauch Chunk Railway, was a coal-hauling railroad in the mountains of Pennsylvania that was built in 1827 and operated until 1932. It was the second gravity railway constructed in the United States, which was used by the Lehigh Coal & Navigation Company to transport coal from Summit Hill downhill to the Lehigh canal.

The railway operated on 3 ft 6 in (1,067 mm) gauge track, and it was not utilized as a common carrier that linked with other railroads. The rail line was laid on top of the company's earlier 9-mile (14 km)-constant-descent-graded wagon road. The railway operated for more than half a century as a tourist attraction after it ceased day-to-day operations as a freight railroad in 1872. The onset of the Great Depression resulted in its eventual closure.

Pennsylvania's first railroad and first anthracite carrier opened on Saturday, May 5th, 1827, when seven cars of coal passed from the Summit Hill mines of the L.C.&N. Company to their canal at Jim Thorpe, Pennsylvania, descending 936 feet (285 m) in the nine-mile (14 km) trip.

— Earl J. Heydinger

== History ==
The Mauch Chunk Switchback Railway was the second permanent railroad (Note: Heydinger describes two earlier, but temporary funicular railways (using the same equipment) which moved overburden and foundation materials to fill in Boston's Back Bay and reshape Beacon Hill—which had three summits when the projects began.) constructed in the United States and the first over five miles long.

=== Early days: 1827-1845 ===
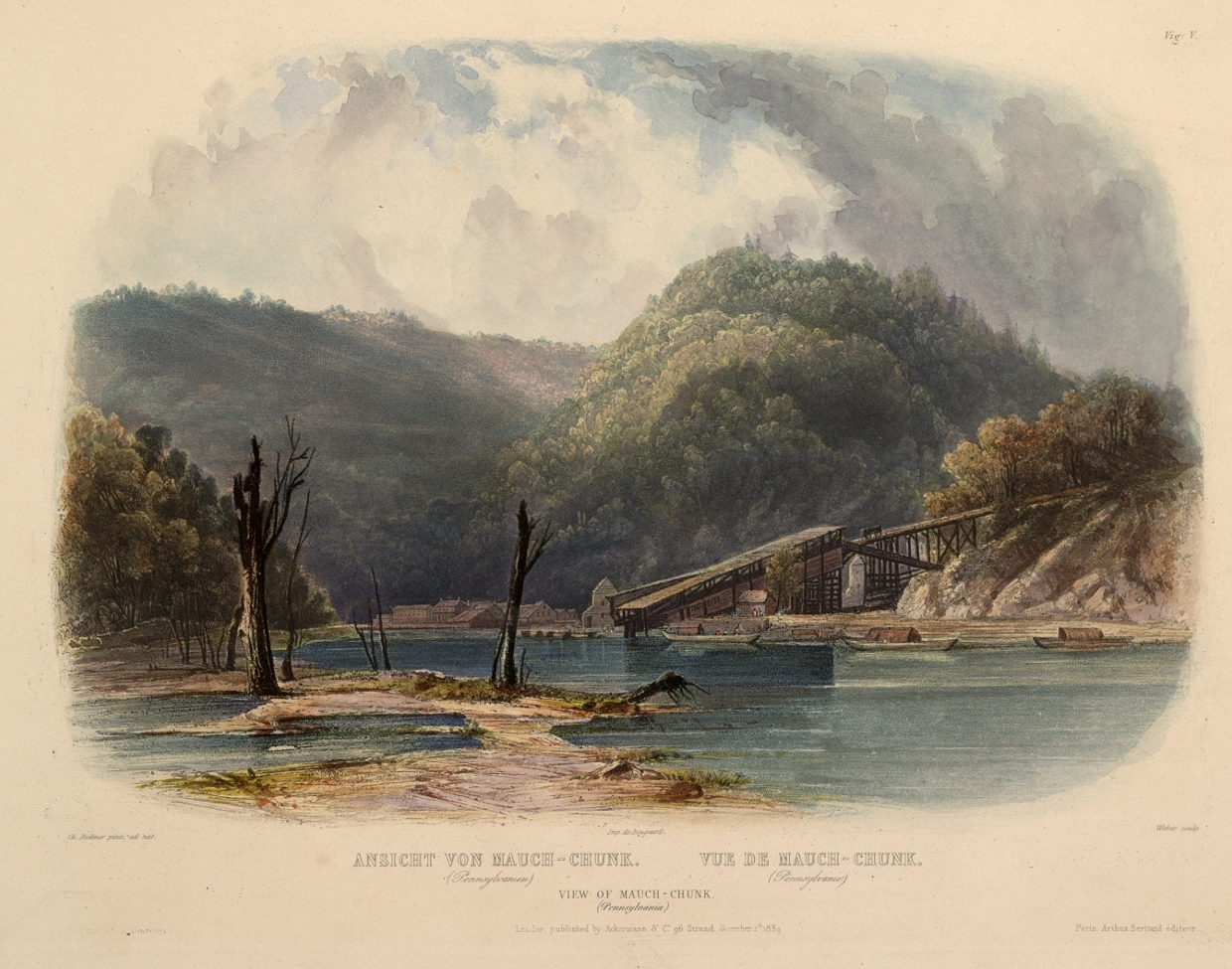
An 1832 portrait of the terminus of the Mauch Chunk & Summit Hill Railroad and the coal loading chutes below by Karl Bodmer

Like its rival the B&O Railroad, the Mauch Chunk at first used animal power. Mules hauled the empty coal tubs to the summit and were sent down in the last batch of cars; the return trip required 4–5 hours. The road would send down groups of 6–8 coal cars under control of a brakeman, and once 40–42 cars were down, send down the special "mule cars" with the draft animals, thus having just enough animals to return all cars back to the top.

The railway used gravity and two inclines. A powered double-incline led up to the top of two separate summits along Pisgah Ridge on the return leg and each summit had "a new down track" returning the cars several miles farther west in each case. This saw-tooth elevation profile gave the new return track a swooping characteristic ride later deliberately designed into roller coasters. About the same time, when other mine heads were opened in lower elevations of the Panther Creek Valley LC&N added several descending switchback sections and other shorter cable railway climbing inclines to bring the coal up from the new Lansford and Coaldale mines to the Summit Hill loading area for the gravity railway trip down to Mauch Chunk, thence to the Lehigh Canal (and in 1855, by rail transport) and their customers. The railroad became an early American tourist attraction and is considered the world's first roller coaster, (Note: The earliest documented pleasure riders were in 1827 by visitors out to admire the new railway technology. This gives rise to the credit of the railway as the first roller coaster.) a role it would keep and satisfy with tourists for over five decades after it was abandoned as a primary freight railroad.

=== 1846-1871 ===
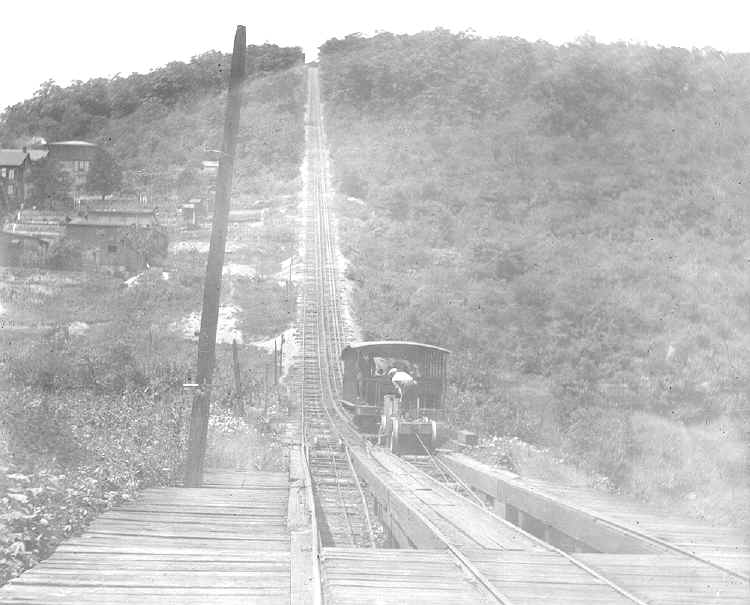
The 'Up Route' cable Railway addition of 1846-47

By 1845 the increasing demand for coal and the poor logistics of a single-track route meant the company needed to improve its railroad. In 1846, they built a new uphill line using two steam-powered, Josiah White engineered 120 horsepower (89 kW) funicular systems to replace move cars uphill. These inclines used two telescoping wheeled Barney pusher cars attached to the cables by steel tow-bands running between two large diameter winch wheels (Note: Winch wheels, similar to a Ski Lift, especially the wheels on a cable car system, but low to the ground for the Barney cars to chase around reversing travel direction and track at either end.) located in the Barney tunnels. When a car was ready to ascend, it was drifted down the slight incline from above and behind the Barney tunnel to wait at a latch. The barneys came up and coupled behind to push the cars uphill. One of the inclines rose 664 feet (202 m) up Mount Pisgah, and the other crossed Mount Jefferson. The downhill trip continued to be powered by gravity. The up track was equipped with a ratchet (Note: Up track ratchets are almost an anomaly, these show an unusual safety-first attitude for something implemented in this period.) which would prevent a car that detached from the cable from running away down hill. This invention later evolved into the anti-rollback device used on roller coasters. The railroad changed its name to the Mauch Chunk, Summit Hill and Switchback Railroad. The modernization of the railroad reduced a passenger round-trip from 4.5 hours to just 80 minutes.

=== 1872-closure ===
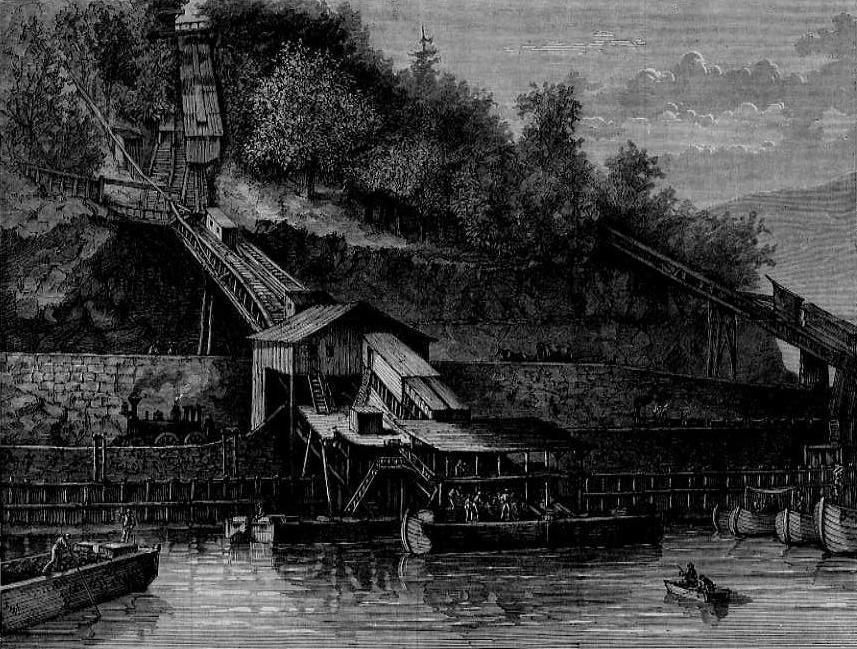
Engraving of the Lehigh Canal in the February 1873 edition of Harper's Weekly

In 1872, the Panther Creek Railroad opened as a replacement for the switchback line. The Lehigh Coal and Railroad is considered the first American company to use vertical integration, providing raw materials, shipping, processing and final goods.

Some famous personalities who visited the railroad include Prince Maximilian of Wied, President Ulysses S. Grant, William Astor, son of John Jacob Astor, and Thomas Edison. The Central Railroad of New Jersey (CNJ) purchased it in 1874 and leased it to brothers Theodore and H. L. Mumford who operated the line as a tourist attraction. On May 24, 1929, the CNJ sold the line to the new Mauch Chunk Switchback Railway Company, which operated until 1932, when the line fell victim to the Great Depression. The mortgage on the property foreclosed and it was sold to scrapper Isaac Weiner for $18,000 (equal to $424,756 today).

=== National Register of Historic Places ===
In 1976, a 47-acre (19 ha) section of the former right-of-way, from Ludlow St. in Summit Hill to F.A.P. 209 in Jim Thorpe, was listed on the National Register of Historic Places as "Mauch Chunk and Summit Hill Switchback Railroad". The listed area included four contributing sites.

The right-of-way is now the Switchback Railroad Trail.

== Gallery ==
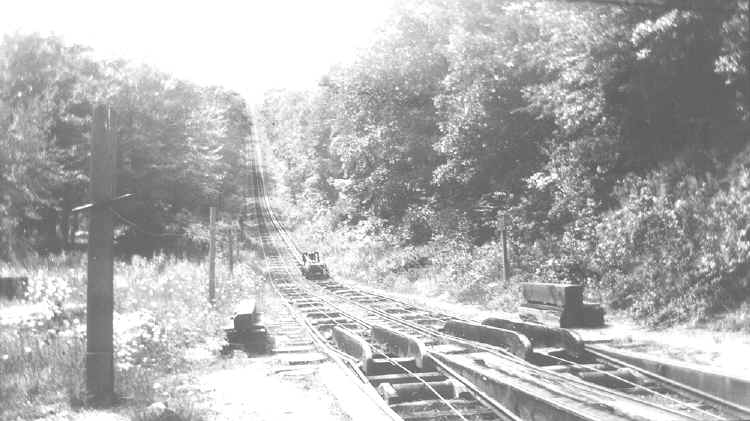
Looking up the Jefferson plane

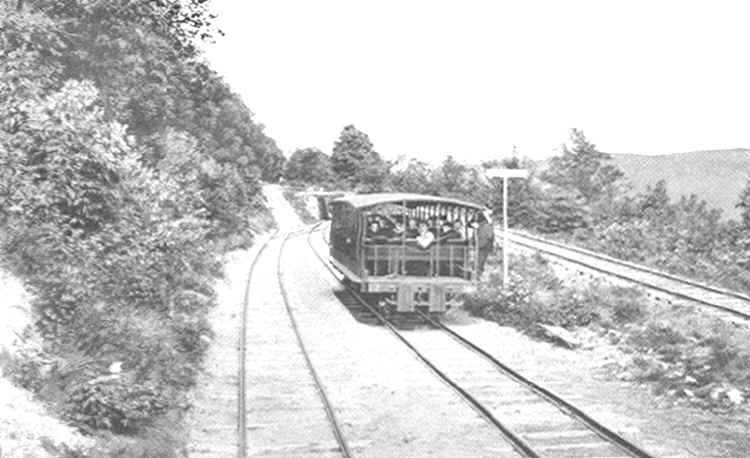
A car near the Five Mile Tree crossover bridge

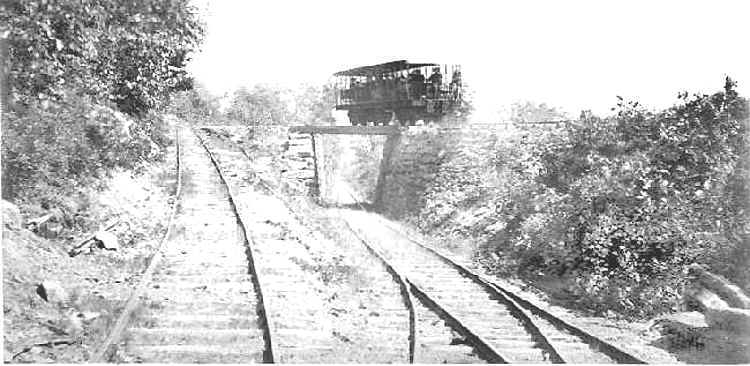
About halfway up, where the up and down tracks crossed

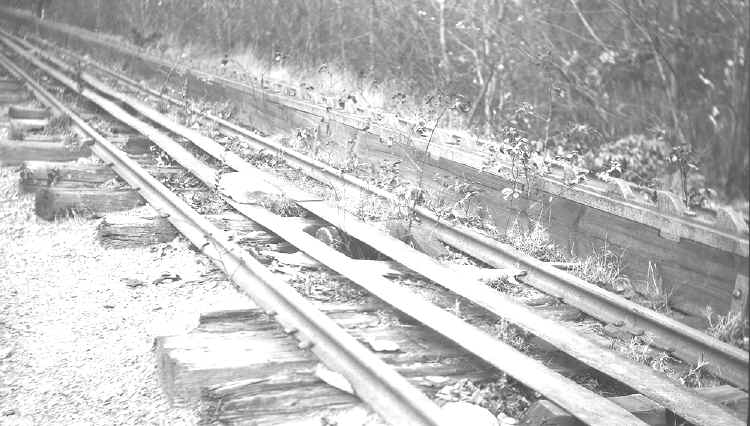
The track, with cables and safety ratchet

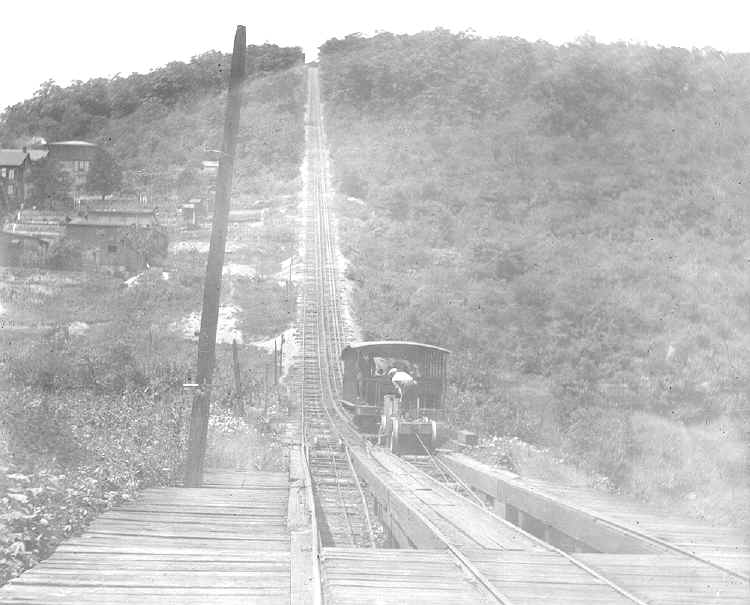
Looking up Mount Pisgah

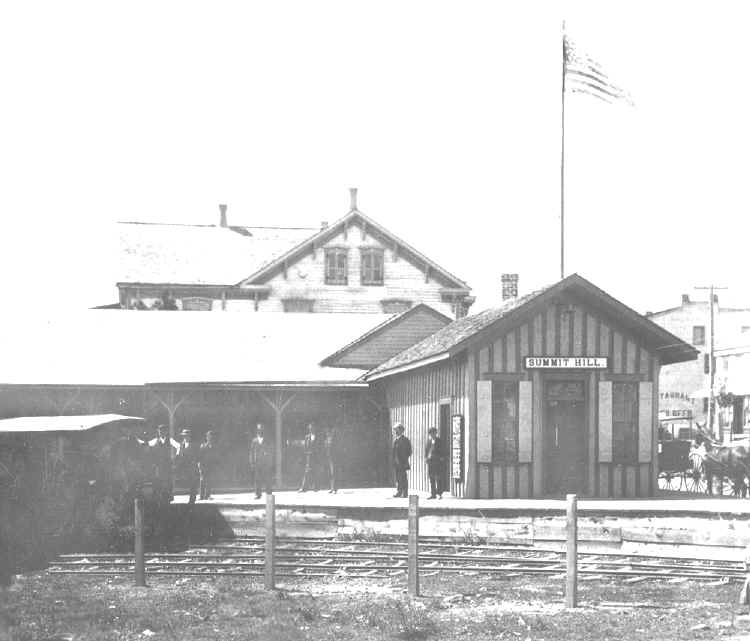
The Summit Hill station

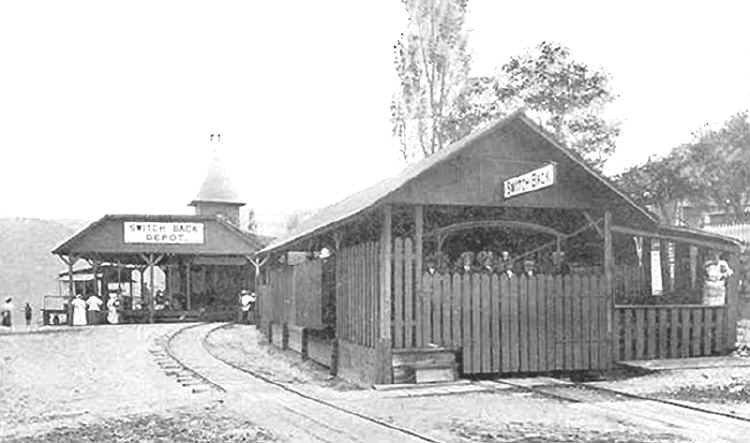
The Mauch Chunk station
