= Nesquehoning Valley Railroad =

Railroad in Pennsylvania, completed in 1872

Map

The Nesquehoning Valley Railroad Company, herein called the Nesquehoning Valley Railroad (NVRR), is now a fallen flag standard-gauge, steam era shortline railroad built as a coal road to ship the Anthracite mined in the Southeastern Coal Region on either side of the Little Schuylkill River tributary Panther Creek and the history making coal towns of the Panther Creek Valley down the Lehigh River transportation corridor to the Eastern seaboard.

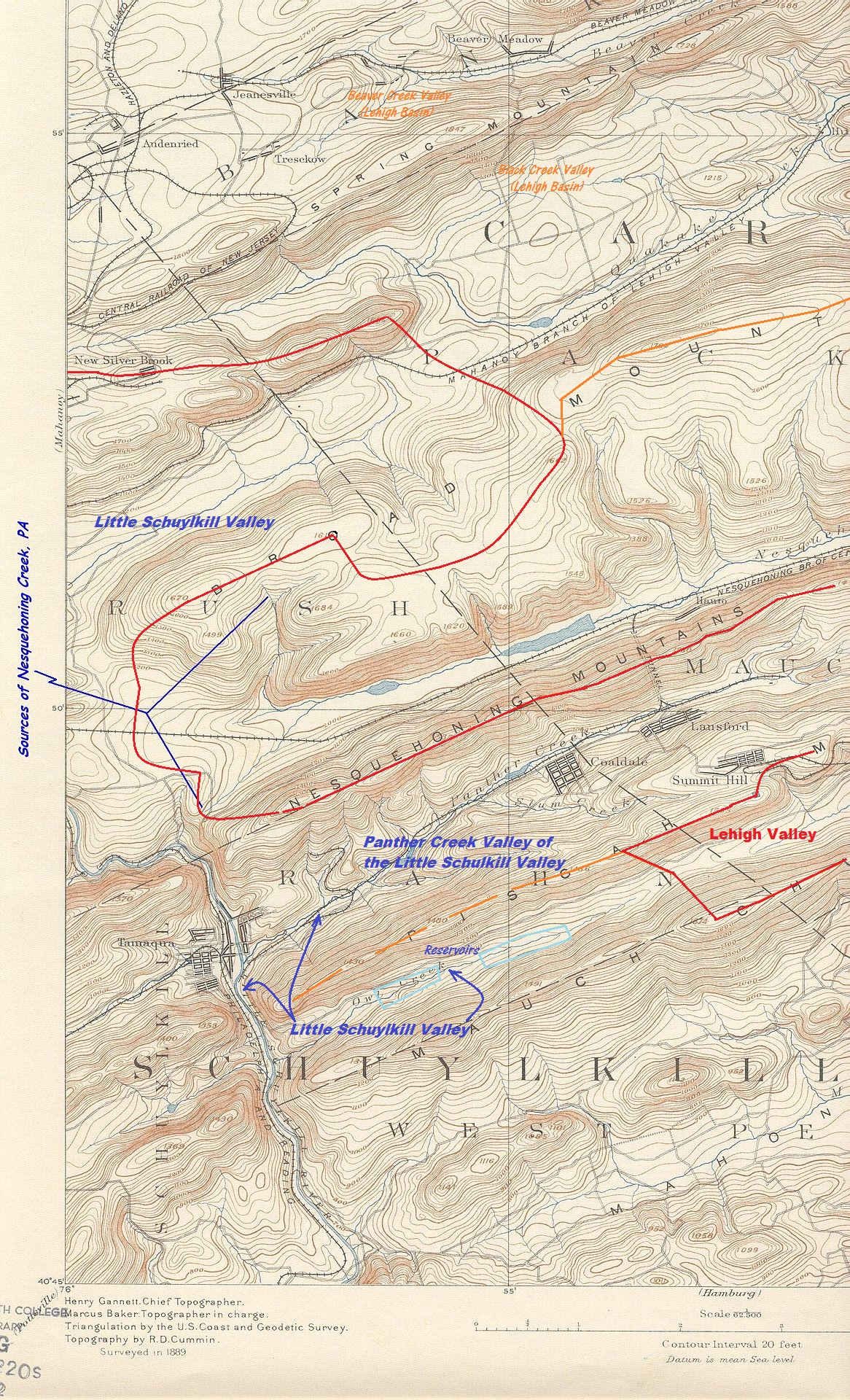
The lower two-thirds of this 1893 USGS topo map shows the Nesquehoning Valley Railroad (Unenhanced) as it climbs past the Hauto Tunnel (and the Hauto lakes north of Lansford) to Hometown left to right on the Nesquehoning Valley on this map. The lower third shows the four towns atop the Southeastern Coal Region in the Panther Creek Valley the railroad was originally designed to connect. It also clearly delineates where the ridge lines are and the upper left corner shows the convoluted rail lines of several railroads which are desperately trying to change altitude and connect less desperate corridors. It is noteworthy and thought provoking to consider that LC&N did not slow or close operations of their Summit Hill & Mauch Chunk Railroad, until a year after CNJ proved out the Hauto Tunnel.

It was one of a variety of regional railroads which were subsidiaries of Lehigh Coal & Navigation Company (LC&N), wherein the LC&N company financed part of the joint venture with outside interests; and often later bought a majority share or merged the railway into its railroad operating subsidiary, Lehigh & Susquehanna Railroad (LH&S).

Its 38.521 mi (61.994 km) of track were located within Carbon County and Schuylkill Counties in the State of Pennsylvania, less than half of which was within the valley formed by the Nesquehoning Creek, which ascent was straight forward. The majority of the track is thus in the Schuylkill Basin using more curvaceous climbing.

The road had virtually no rolling stock, instead being an example of a shortline built in a corridor that was a necessary choice and then leveraging the niche established against the needs of operating rail companies. The owned mileage extends in a westerly direction from Nesquehoning Junction to Tamenend, 16.719 miles, with a line 0.955 mile in length leaving the above-described road in the village of Hauto, and extending southerly through the Hauto Tunnel into coal mine trackage in Lansford, Pennsylvania. The Nesquehoning Valley Railroad embraces 38.521 miles (61.994 km). The entire railroad was leased shortly after its construction to the Lehigh Coal & Navigation Company, which in turn subleased 16.719 miles to The Central Railroad Company of New Jersey (CNJ, or Jersey Central) and 0.955 mile to the Lehigh and New England Railroad Company.

== Development ==
The Nesquehoning Valley Railroad was incorporated by special act of Pennsylvania approved May 14, 1861, for the purpose of constructing a railroad from a point near the mouth of the Nesquehoning Creek (known now as Nesquehoning Junction and the former Lausanne Landing, in the borough of Jim Thorpe) where it joined the Lehigh and Susquehanna Railroad between Easton-Mountain Top from whence it began to climb, struggling steadily upwards in a long climb beside Nesquehoning Creek with Nesquehoning Ridge to the south, and Broad Mountain to the north up past the streams' headwaters below the drainage divide at Hometown in the saddle of the pass. From there the road dropped down westerly into the valley of Little Schuylkill River where it took a convoluted path entering Tamaqua where it connected to the Panther Creek Railroad and the Philadelphia and Reading Railway (Reading Railroad) at Tamaqua Junction.

The Nesquehoning Valley Railroad also enjoys the powers and is subject to the restrictions of a general law approved February 19, 1849. In 1861 the Nesquehoning Valley Railroad began the construction of its road. The work was temporarily suspended in the latter part of the year 1862, but was resumed in 1868. The main line was completed in April, 1870, and the Hauto Tunnel between the village and railyard at Hauto along the Nesquehoning Creek to the coal breakers and coal yards in Lansford, Pennsylvania, and the rest of the Panther Creek Valley was completed in 1872, as a joint-effort of the CNJ, the new lessee of the Lehigh and Susquehanna Railroad subsidiary of the Lehigh Coal & Navigation Company.

The Nesquehoning Valley Railroad would in time connect the Lehigh Canal and CNJ's customers to the coal deposits around Mahanoy City, and those deposits in the Panther Creek to customers beyond in the lower Susquehanna Valley. With the strength of this connective flexibility, the roadbed of the NVRR is still in use today as an important standard E-W rail corridor, today operated by the Reading, Blue Mountain and Northern Railroad.
