= Nesquehoning =

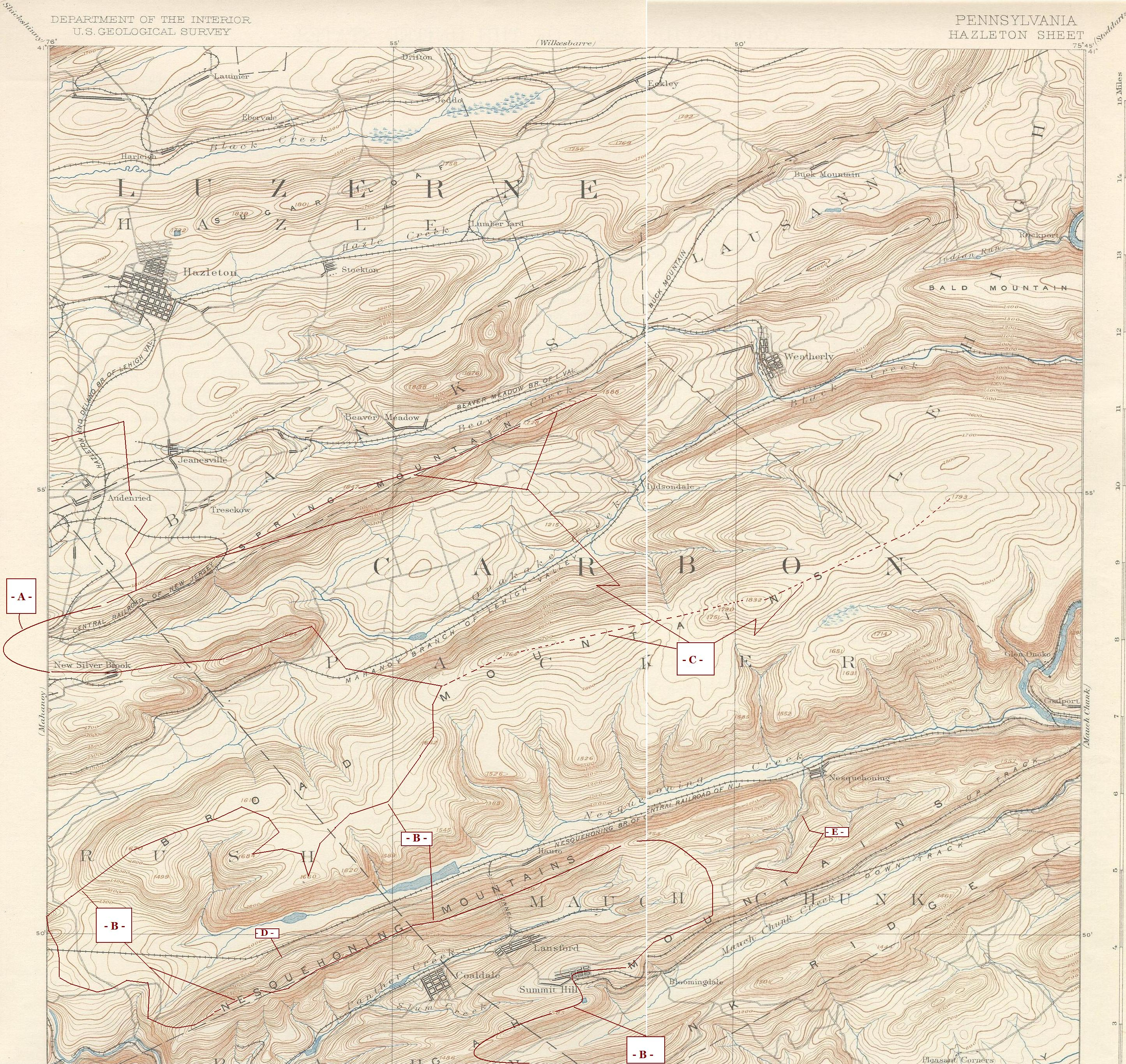
Most of the Nesquehoning landscape and place names are visible on this topological map.

Nesquehoning may refer to the following places in the U.S. state of Pennsylvania:

- Nesquehoning, Pennsylvania, a borough in Carbon County
  - Nesquehoning High School, in the above borough
- Nesquehoning Creek, a tributary of the Lehigh River
- Nesquehoning Mountain, also known as Nesquehoning Ridge, a 15-17 mile long coal bearing ridge
