= Nesquehoning Creek =

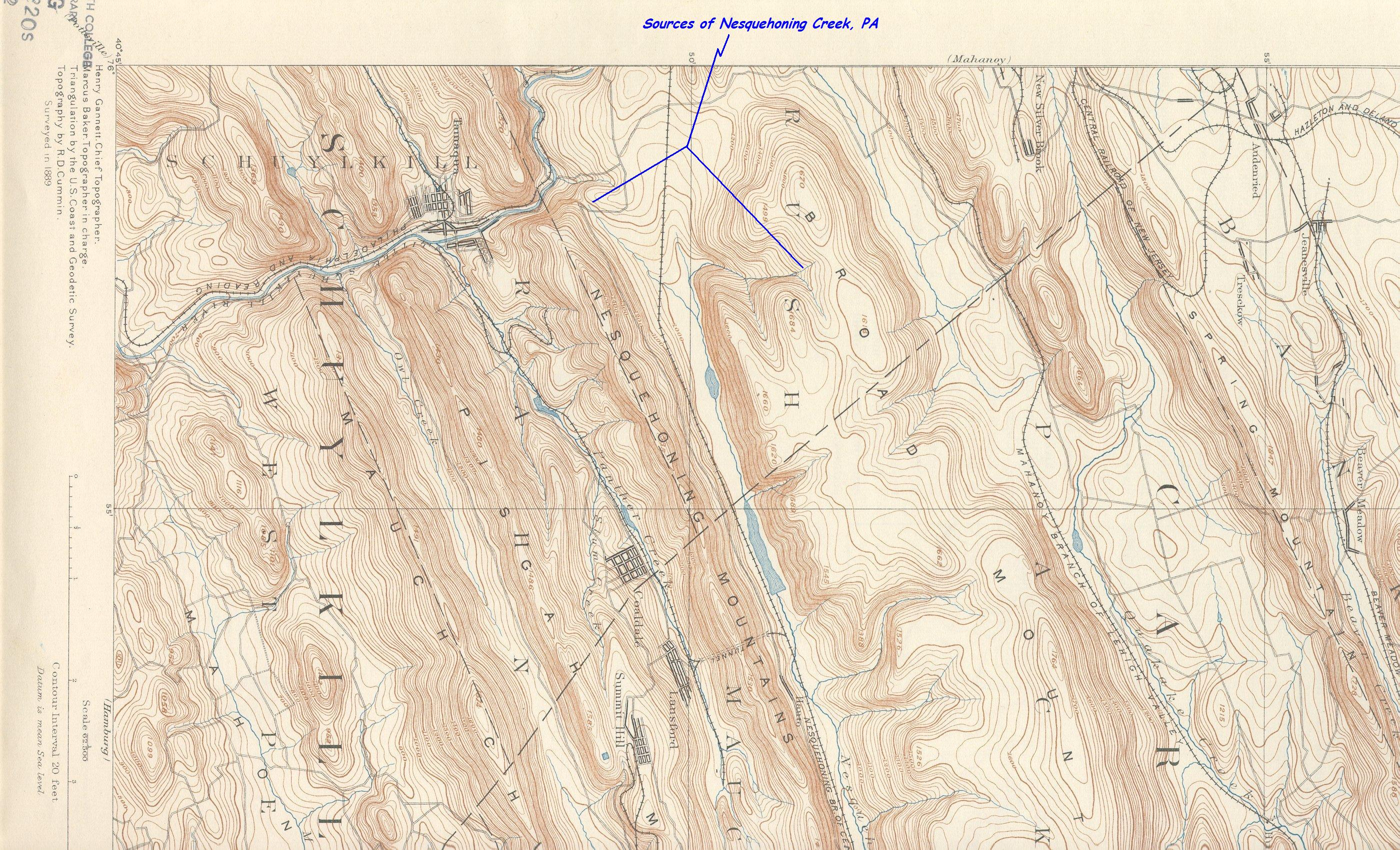
- Twin sources of Nesquehoning Creek as Nesquehoning Mountain and Broad Mountain merge in the saddle above Tamaqua, Pennsylvania and below the drainage divide from the Little Schuylkill River below and west. (Image is rotated so east is at bottom)

Physical characteristics
- Source
  - location: Highest of two: on south face Broad Mountain above Hometown
  - coordinates: 40.85°N 75.975°W
  - elevation: 1,360 feet (415 m)
- Mouth
  - location: Lehigh River between Jim Thorpe and Nesquehoning, Pennsylvania, U.S.
  - coordinates: 40°52′32″N 75°45′41″W
- Length: 14.9 mi (24.0 km)

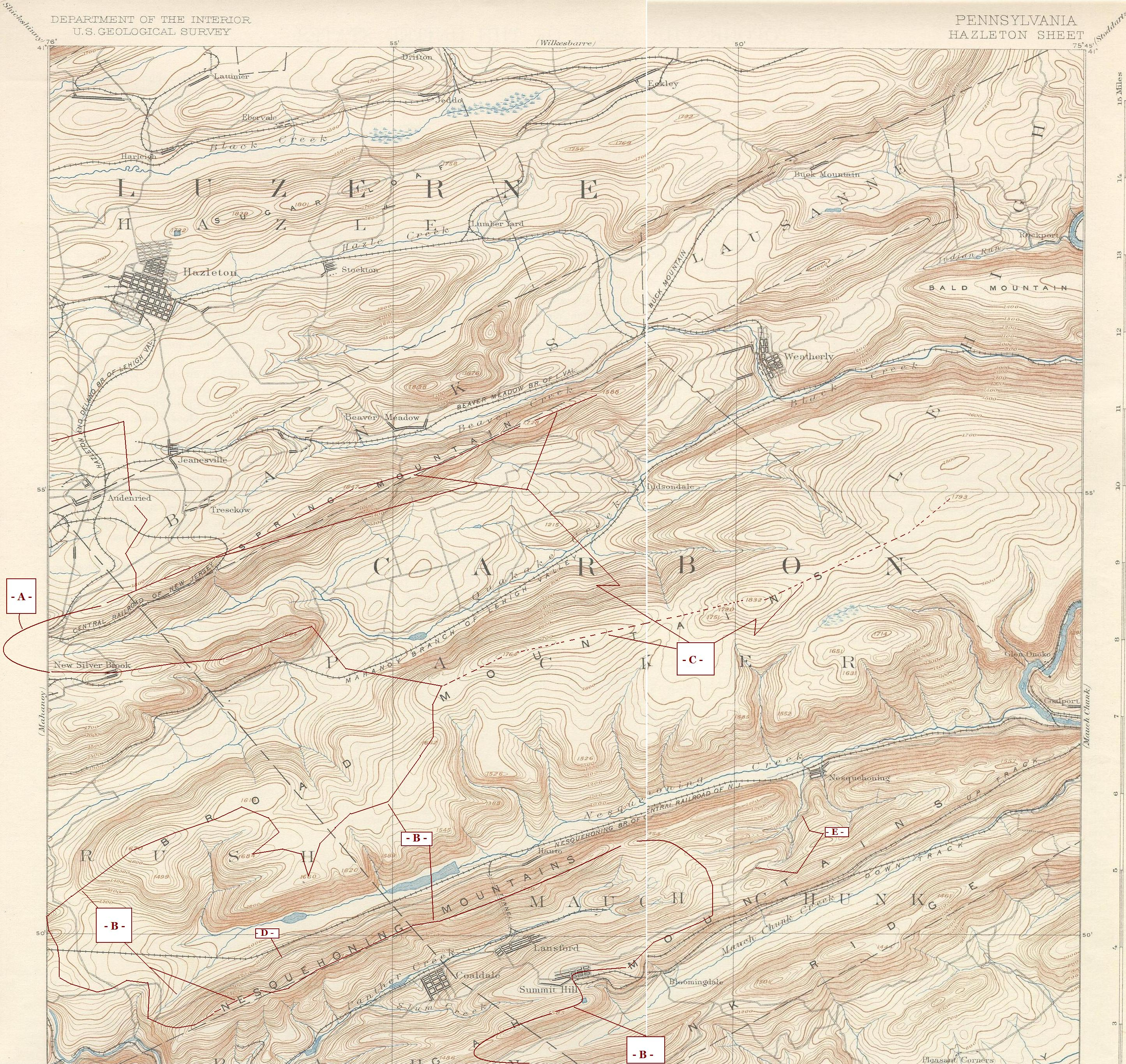
Coal-laden parallel ridges north of Blue Mountain, Pennsylvania in the physiographic province of the Anthracite Upland Section; in the Lehigh Valley, Nesquehoning Creek terminates below Nesquehoning between two important railroad transfer yards, falling from its western source between Broad Mountain and Nesquehoning Mountain.

Nesquehoning Creek is an east-flowing 14.9-mile-long (24.0 km) tributary of the Lehigh River in northeastern Pennsylvania in the United States.

Nesquehoning Creek joins the Lehigh River 2 miles (3.2 km) upstream of the borough of Jim Thorpe in Carbon County.

== Name ==
Nesquehoning is a name derived from a Native American language purported to mean "at the black lick".

== Course and history ==
Nesquehoning Creek rises along the slopes of Nesquehoning Ridge and Broad Mountain and flows through two man-made lakes in its descent through a generally steep sided gully bottomed V-shaped valley. Along most of its run the stream hugs Broad Mountain which contributes tributary waters and digs it deeper below the navigable floor of the valley.

Nesquehoning Creek encompasses a 34 square miles (88 km^{2}) sq-mi drainage area between Broad Mountain to the northwest and the north along the left bank of its generally eastern course and Nesquehoning Mountain to the south. It rises in the peaks flanking the join of the two ridgelines in a saddle at Hometown, PA and terminates in the Lehigh River about two miles below the town of Nesquehoning, Pennsylvania in the shadow of Mount Pisgah from which several minor unnamed tributary streams descend adding their waters. All the mountains in the area are among a series of near parallel ridgelines in the region. Approximately 7.2 square miles (18.6 km^{2}) of the drainage basin or watershed is located in Schuylkill County while 26.7 square miles (69.2 km^{2}) is located in Carbon County.

Nesquehoning Creek originates in two forested gullies diametrically opposed N-to-S along the east edge of Hometown, the major fork on the slopes of Broad Mountain to the north and the minor to the south on the last minor peak of Nesquehoning Ridge. From their confluence the creek flows south for about 2 miles (3.2 km) then turns to the northeast and flows into and through Greenwood Lake, which is nearly a mile long. Approximately 600 feet (180 m) downstream from the spillway, it discharges into Lake Hauto, both lakes being man-made. It then continues to the northeast in a relatively narrow valley over its steepest stretch then flattens out and slows making its way through Nesquehoning, which is a right bank town. The stream then travels down a narrow undeveloped ladder or rapids section where its elevation drops significantly to its confluence with the Lehigh River opposite and downstream from the Lehigh River Gorge around the bend from Jim Thorpe, PA formed by the roots of Mount Pisgah. Six left bank tributaries enter the stream below Hauto Dam from State Game Lands No. 141 before and west of the 1,563 feet (476.4 m) summit on Broad Mountain, the uppermost named 'Broad Run', the lower 'Deep Run' being the largest and named, the other four being short and relatively insignificant rills.

The heavily forested, relatively steep slopes of Broad and Nesquehoning Mountains and the occasional culm piles characterize the land within the watershed. All travel is channeled in the area by the terrain, so north-south oriented highways are rare and need a saddle pass such as at the streams headwater area for such to cross the valleys. Consequently, Hometown, a small high-elevation outlier of Tamaqua sits in such a pass astride the junction of Pennsylvania Route 54 and Pennsylvania Route 309 and contains railroad switch junctions as well that connect trackage to the Wyoming Valley, points south and the Panther Creek Valley via Tamaqua of the Blue Mountain and points west through the Mahanoy Creek valley.

The Nesquehoning Creek valley consists of some residential and industrial development, including a power plant, but was primarily a transit corridor. The Hauto Dam constructed opposite the north entrance of the mile-long Hauto Railway Tunnel protected a railroad switching yard for the coal trains servicing the mines in Lansford and Coaldale inside the Panther Creek valley on the opposite side of Nesquehoning Mountain. Nesquehoning Junction is a named small railyard downstream and within the town of that name along the lower creek. Right bank urban development is concentrated in the Borough of Nesquehoning, left bank development in New Columbus opposite Nesquehoning and at the source region in Hometown.

Large areas in the valley have been dramatically disturbed by coal mining related activities. Much of the runoff from strip mines is retained in abandoned pits and therefore lesser amounts of surface runoff is discharged into Nesquehoning Creek. The middle two lesser tributary rills noted previously join in one such containment pond in an old Broad Mountain strip mine just above Nesquehoning.

The use of the former Lehigh Valley Railroad, Central Railroad of New Jersey (CNJ) and route PA-54 marks the importance of the creeks' valley as an important transportation corridor in an area where road beds are highly constricted. The trackage today is used by both the Reading, Blue Mountain and Northern Railroad and Norfolk Southern. The watershed encompasses four municipalities.

U.S. Route 209 climbs up inside the V-shaped gully of the westernmost of these from the beginning terminus junction with PA-54 within downtown Nesquehoning up over the ridge to the headwaters region of the Panther Creek Valley across the Nesquehoning Ridge drainage divide into the valley formed with Pisgah Ridge.

Part of the waters are pooled in Lake Hauto above the Hauto Dam in the Hamlet of Hauto, near where the historically important Hauto Tunnel serviced the many coal breakers of Lansford, Coaldale, and historic Summit Hill. The Lehigh Valley Railroad and the Central Railroad of Pennsylvania (CNJ), both Class I railroads ran trackage up slope to cross north and west over the mountain ridges.

== Communities ==
The stream runs through the following municipalities source-to-mouth:

- Rush Township, Schuylkill County officially at 1,129 feet (344 m)
- Lehigh Township, Carbon County
- Packer Township, Carbon County
- Nesquehoning borough, Carbon County officially at 830 ft (253 m) (above stream level, mouth is two miles further east)
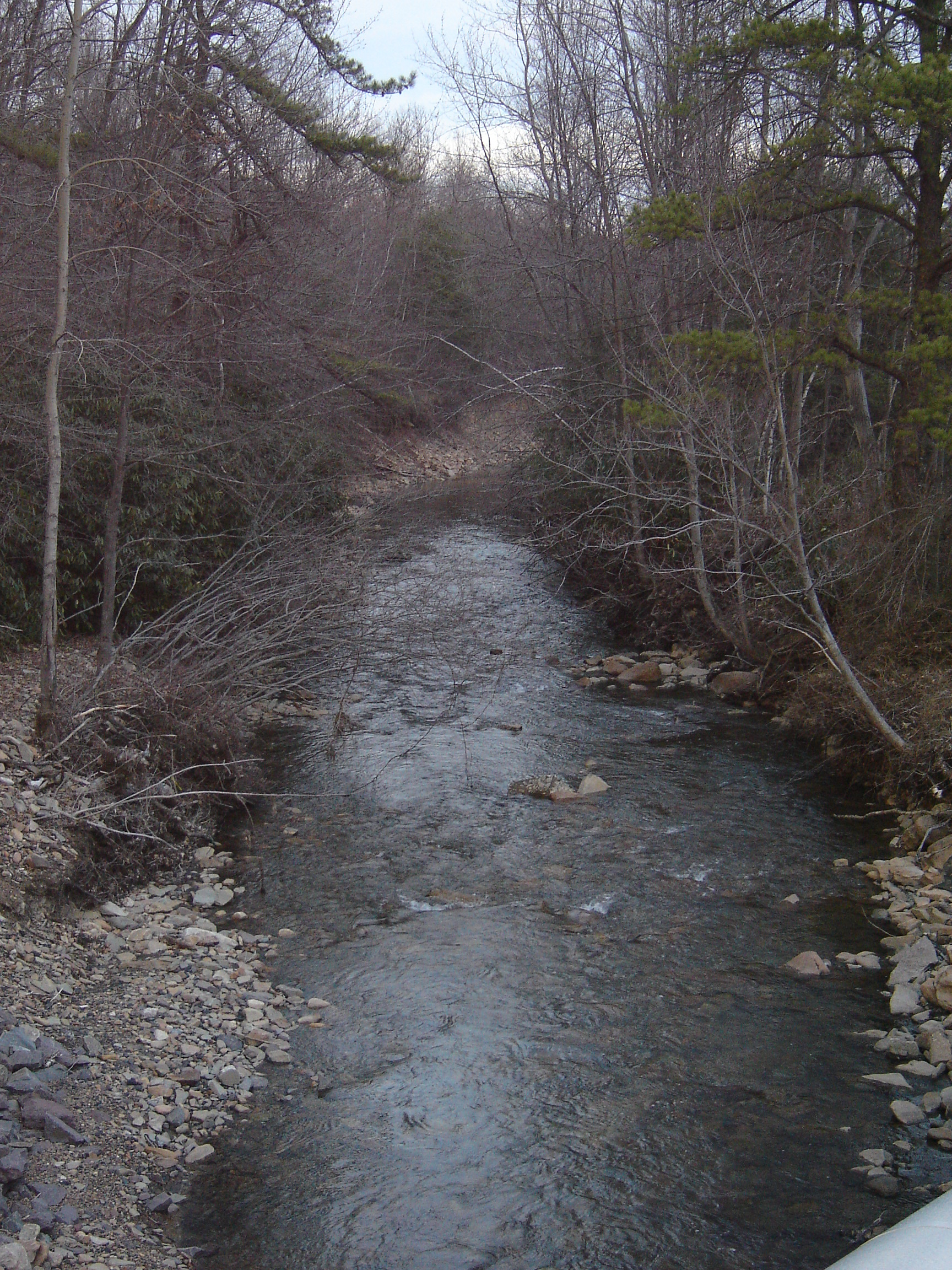
Nesquehoning Creek at the bridge on Industrial Road, Green Acres Industrial Park

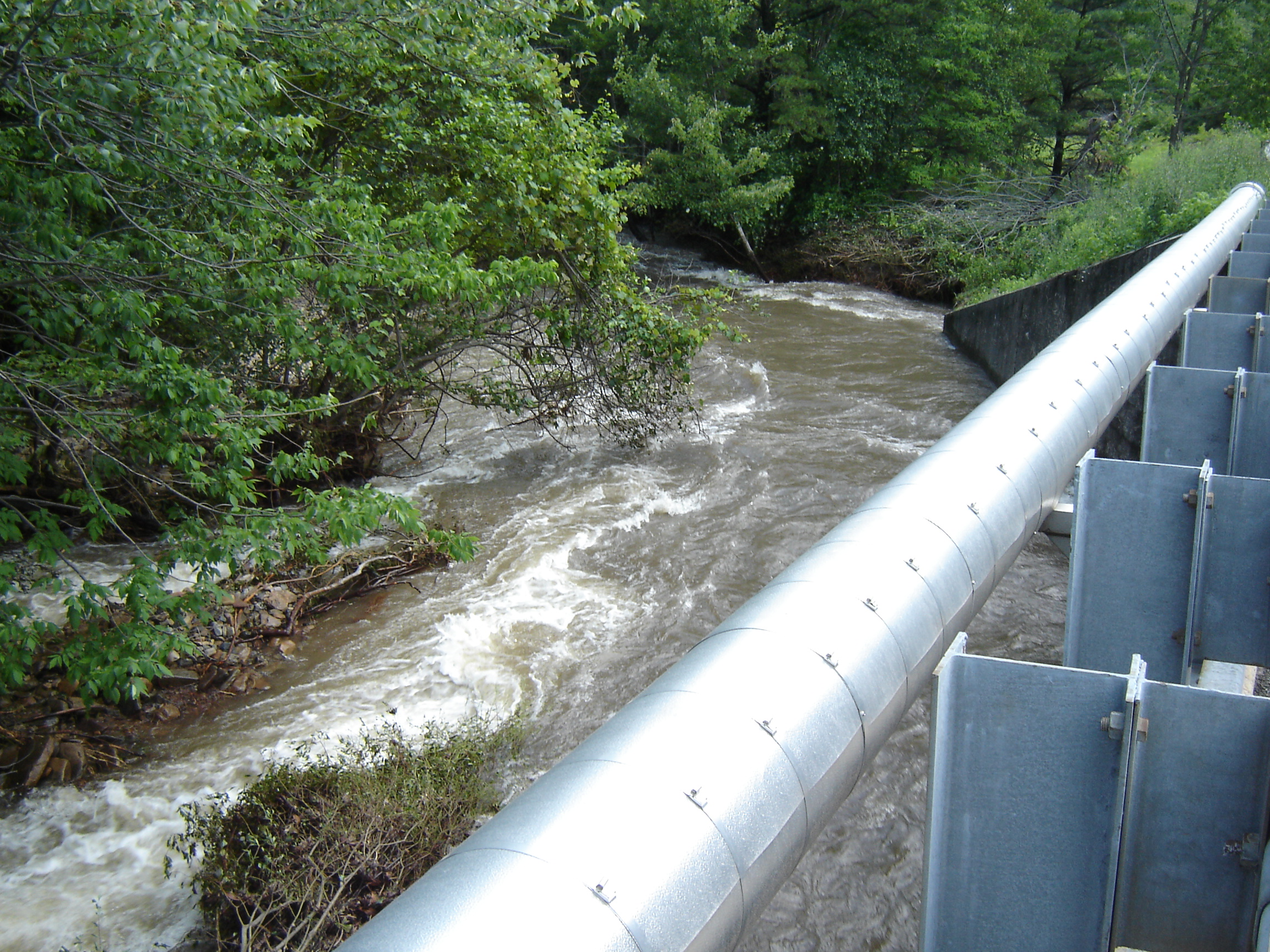
Nesquehoning Creek during the flood of June 27, 2006

== See also ==
- Broad Run Reservoir
- List of rivers of Pennsylvania
