= Bethlehem Branch (disambiguation) =

The Bethlehem Branch could refer to following:

- the former main line of the North Pennsylvania Railroad between Bethlehem and Philadelphia
  - the Bethlehem Line, a former SEPTA rail service which operated over the above
- the former main line of the Lehigh and Lackawanna Railroad between Bethlehem and Wind Gap
