= Nesquehoning Mountain =

Mountain in Pennsylvania

- Nesquehoning Ridge
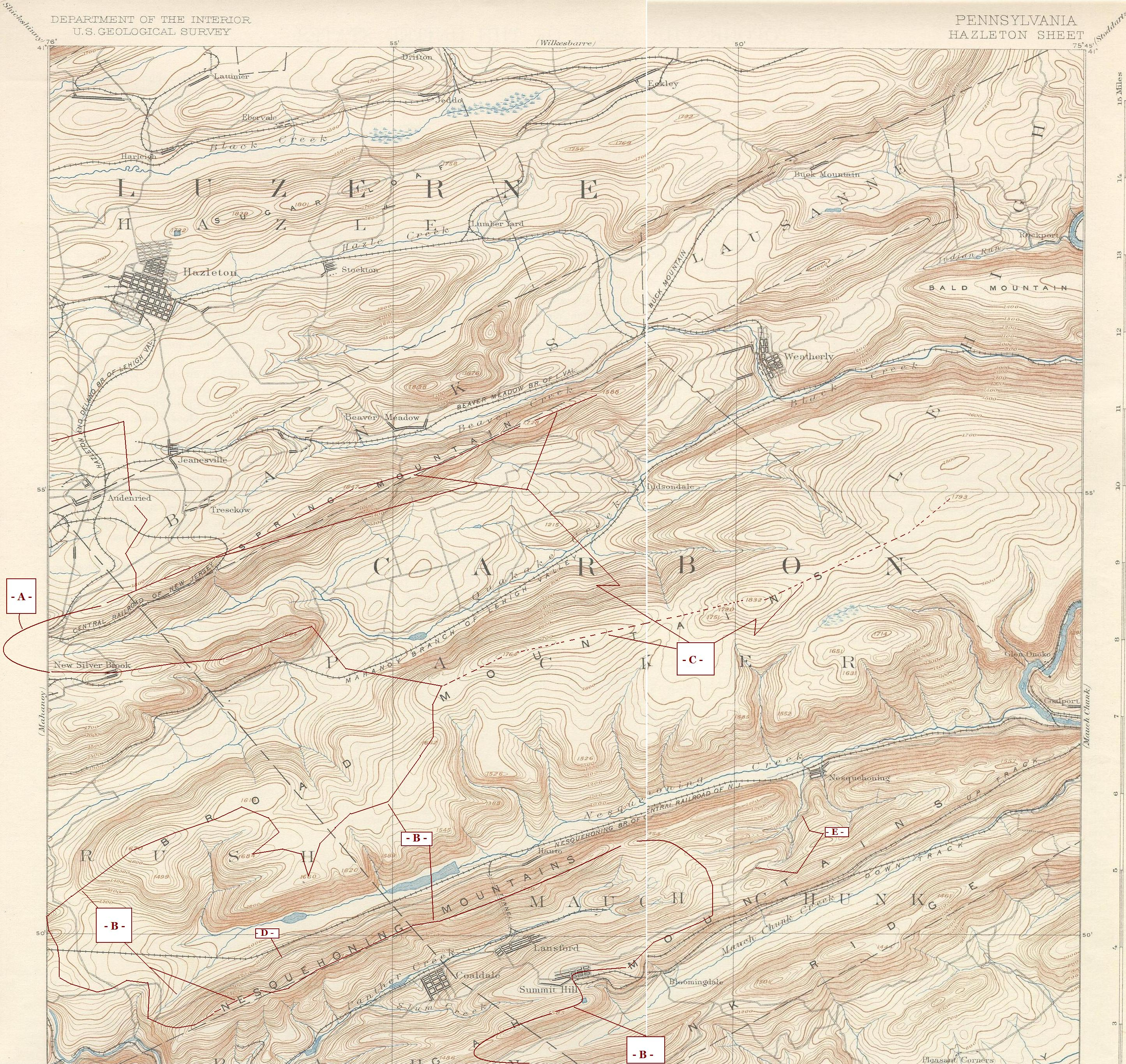

Highest point
- Peak: Lat/Lng:405000N 0755457W
- Elevation: 1,535 ft (468 m)
- Coordinates: 40°50′0″N 75°54′57″W

Dimensions
- Length: 25 mi (40 km) east-west
- Width: 1–2 km (0.62–1.24 mi) north-south

Geography
- Country: United States
- State: Pennsylvania
- Borders on: Ridge-and-Valley Appalachians and Great Appalachian Valley

Geology
- Orogeny: Appalachian Mountains
- Rock age: Silurian
- Rock types: Tuscarora Formation and Shawangunk Formation; sedimentary

Nesquehoning Mountain or Nesquehoning Ridge is a 15–17-mile-long (24–27 km) coal bearing ridge dividing the waters of Lehigh Valley to the north from the Schuylkill River valley and the several near parallel ridgelines of the Ridge-and-Valley Appalachians barrier range all local members of which run generally WSW-ENE in the greater overall area.

Nestled above a creek sculpted ravine across from the even less negotiable sides of Broad Mountain the flanks above Nesquehoning Creek reach a sharp bend cut by the water gap of the Lehigh River and merge with the ridge of Pisgah Ridge to the south into a common terminal mountain, Mount Pisgah within sight of the Poconos in a region once touted as "The Switzerland of America" along the eastern edge of the Southern Anthracite Region, all several ridge lines north of Blue Mountain, which in part provides the source waters for Nesquehoning Creek, a tributary of the Lehigh River in the Poconos in Northeastern Pennsylvania.

== History ==
The heavily forested, relatively steep slopes of Broad and Nesquehoning Mountains characterize the land within the watershed. While US 209 and PA 93 (Note: PA 93 in contrast to US 209 climbing from Nesquehoning are characteristically different with the former being gentle enough to have once been the Lehigh and Susquehanna Turnpike a wagon road that began its climb from the area of Lausanne Landing near the mouth of the Nesquehoning Creek.) both climb watercourse ravines on opposite sides of the valley, the Nesquehoning route is very steep and was not anything more than a mule road before the systematic attempt to create a U.S. highway was put through alongside the creek.

The Nesquehoning Creek Valley consists of some residential and industrial development. Urban development is concentrated in the Borough of Nesquehoning and Hometown along the climb to Barnesville, where the transportation corridor can drop down into the Mahanoy Creek Valley. In 1830, Lehigh Coal & Navigation Company operating manager Josiah White opened mining digs at overt anthracite outcroppings in Room Run ravine, and built a self-acting plane funicular railroad two miles downstream to the company's Lehigh Canal.

Large areas in the valley have been disturbed by coal mining related activities, including a majority of terrains down-crest inside the Panther Creek Valley. While the ridge has been extensively mined, most of the digging is on the higher and less steep side of the mountain within the Panther Creek Valley. Much of the runoff from strip mines is retained in abandoned pits, and shaft mines from the Nesquehoning Creek side have been rare, the sole exception being the mine converted into the Lehigh and Susquehanna Railroad's Hauto Tunnel in 1872, and lesser amounts of surface runoff is discharged into Nesquehoning Creek.

== Watersheds ==
Nesquehoning Creek originates both in a forested area on the slopes of Broad Mountain at an elevation somewhat in excess of 1360 ft on USGS topological maps, and above the Tamaqua Gap cut by the Little Schuylkill River and Tamaqua in a saddle pass connecting with Broad Mountain.

It flows south for about 2 miles (3.2 km) then turns to the northeast and flows into Greenwood Lake. Approximately 600 feet (180 m) downstream from the spillway, it discharges into Lake Hauto. It then continues to the northeast in a relatively narrow valley flowing past the ravine now traversed by U.S. Route 209 climbing up Room Run to the upper foot of Mount Pisgah above the divide from Panther Creek. The stream then travels down a narrow undeveloped section to its confluence with the Lehigh River.

== Notes ==
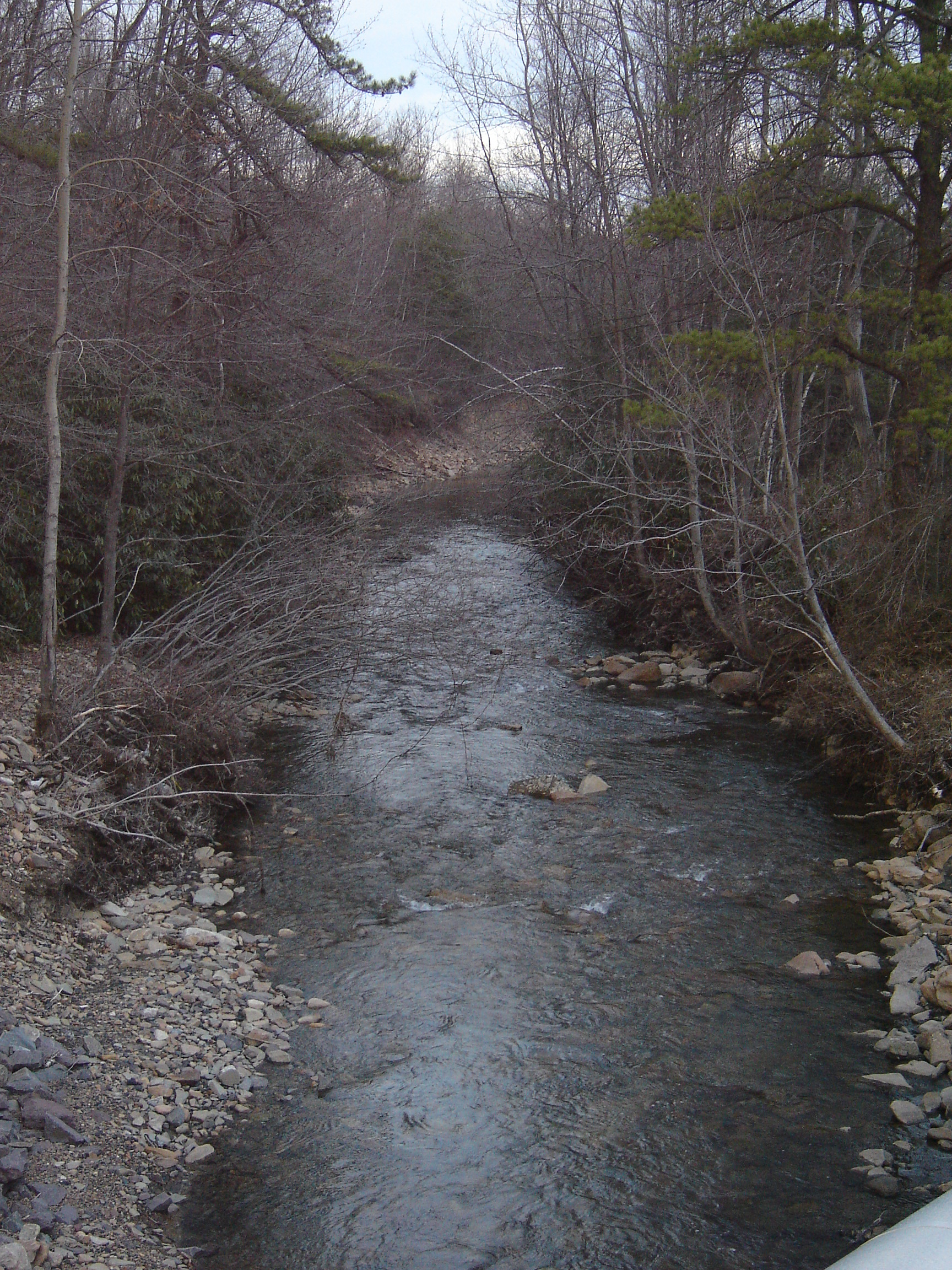
Nesquehoning Creek at the bridge on Industrial Road, Green Acres Industrial Park

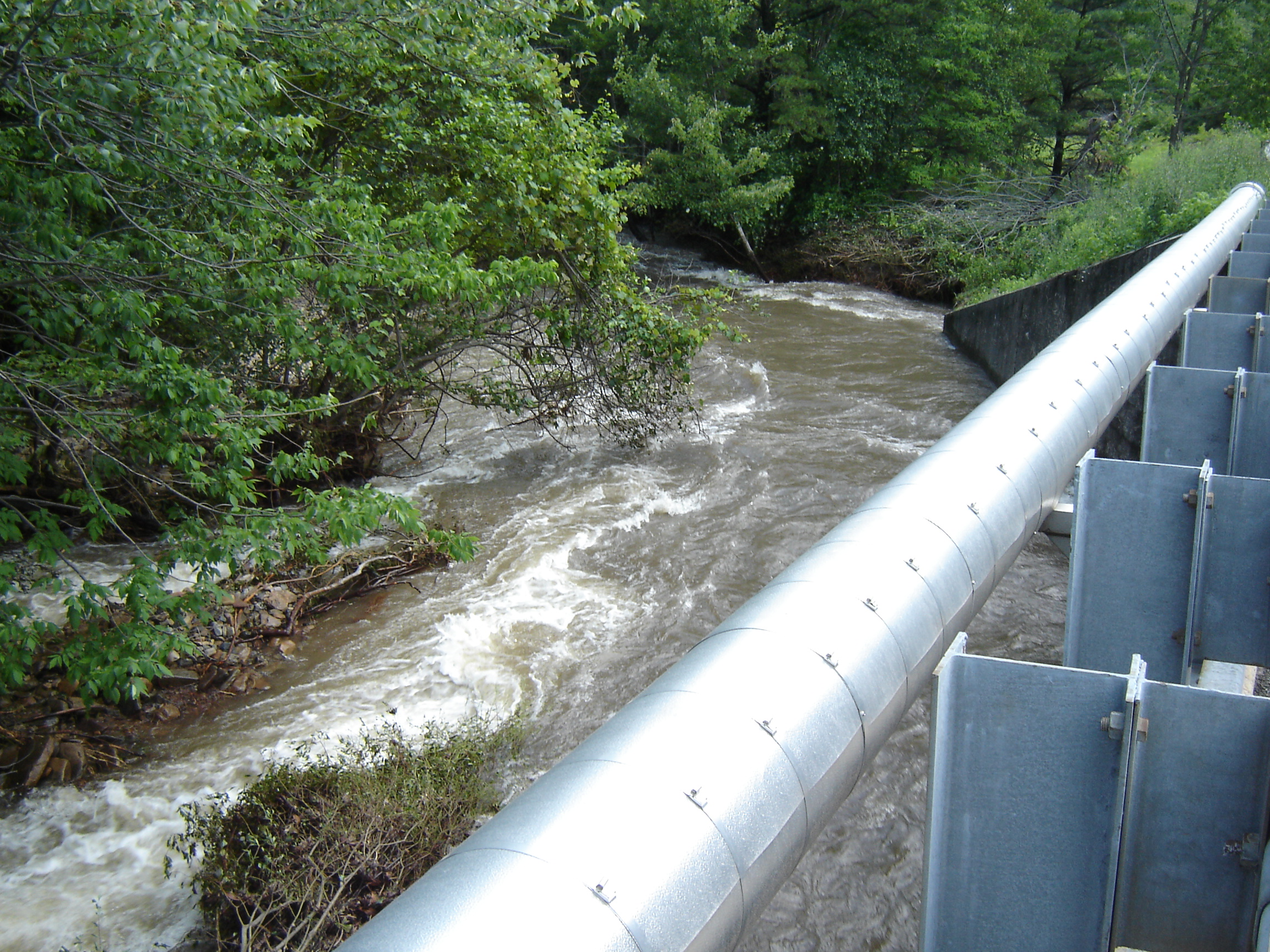
Nesquehoning Creek during the flood of June 27, 2006

== See also ==
- Broad Run Reservoir
- Lehigh Township, Carbon County
- List of rivers of Pennsylvania
- Nesquehoning borough, Carbon County
- Packer Township, Carbon County
- Rush Township, Schuylkill County
