= Panther Creek Railroad =

Defunct Pennsylvania railroad

The Panther Creek Railroad was a six-mile railroad constructed in 1849 to connect rich coal mines in the Panther Creek region of Pennsylvania to eastern markets. The Lehigh Coal & Navigation Company (LC&N) constructed the railroad between Lansford, PA and the Philadelphia and Reading Rail Road (P&R), then operating as the Little Schuylkill Railroad, in Tamaqua, PA. LC&N further developed the project in 1871, constructing the Hauto Tunnel in collaboration with the Central Railroad of New Jersey (CNJ). The railroad was eventually acquired by ConRail in 1976, and the tunnel was later abandoned.

== Origins ==
In 1849, LC&N constructed the six-mile long Panther Creek Railroad from Lansford, PA to Tamaqua, PA. This provided additional access to the rich Panther Valley coal mines in Coaldale and Lansford to wider markets in Philadelphia through the P&R connection in Tamaqua.

In 1871, LC&N collaborated with Central Railroad of New Jersey (CNJ) to construct the Hauto Tunnel. The CNJ operated rail lines in neighboring Hauto, separated from Lansford and the Panther Creek Railroad by a ridge line of the Nesquehoning mountain. The tunnel connected the Panther Creek Railroad to the Nesquehoning Valley Railroad through the ridge line, further incorporating region's coal mines into eastern markets. Work on the 1.1-mile, single-track Hauto Tunnel began in early 1871 and the two tunnel headings met on September 15 of that year. The first train passed through on February 1, 1872.

The tunnel also allowed the LC&N to cease coal shipments to the Lehigh Canal on the Summit Hill & Mauch Chunk Railroad, operating since 1827. Eventually CNJ sold off the latter asset as a common carrier and tourist railway. The tunnel was last used in 1969 and later abandoned.

Eventually, an eastern branch of the railroad was built from Lansford to Summit Hill, PA.

== Successor Railroads ==
In 1871, the LC&N board of directors decided to opt-out of the rail transportation industry and began to lease the railroads it owned or controlled to the CNJ, including the Panther Creek Railroad. The Panther Creek Railroad continued operation until 1901, when the CNJ was acquired by the Reading Railroad.

LC&N gained control of the Lehigh and New England Railroad (L&NE) in 1904. In 1912 a new L&NE extension opened, splitting from the main line at Danielsville, Pennsylvania and running west to Tamaqua to directly serve the LC&N. In October 1913, LC&N transferred its leasehold interest in the Tunnel to Panther Creek Railroad Company by deed which contained a provision that “in the event of abandonment, the right-of-way shall revert to Lehigh Coal.” On December 14, 1913, the L&NE acquired the balance of the Panther Creek Railroad, running east from Tamaqua to Summit Hill, and with a connection to the Hauto Tunnel for access to Nesquehoning obtained in 1915. The L&NE made the route between Hauto and Maybrook, NY its main line.

L&NE decided to end its railroad operations in late 1961. The rapid decline of the anthracite coal business was seen on the horizon led to the decision to cease operations. A few of its routes were spared when the nearby CNJ acquired, among others, its old line to Tamaqua (the old Panther Creek Railroad). This ex-L&NE trackage was operated under a subsidiary known as the Lehigh & New England Railway (not Railroad). The resulting Lehigh & New England Railway operated from 1961 until it was acquired in 1976 by ConRail.

It is now used by the Reading, Blue Mountain and Northern Railroad from Tamaqua to Lansford.
