= Catasauqua Branch =

Overview
- Owner: Crane Railroad (1914); Lehigh and New England Railroad (1914–1961); Lehigh and New England Railway (1961–1976); Conrail (1976–1990s)
- Termini: Bath; Catasauqua

History
- Opened: 1 April 1914
- Closed: c. 1990s

Technical
- Line length: 6.31 mi (10.15 km)
- Track gauge: 1,435 mm (4 ft 8 1/2 in) standard gauge

The Catasauqua Branch was a short railway line in Lehigh and Northampton Counties in the state of Pennsylvania. It was part of the Lehigh and New England Railroad and ran from a point south of Bath to Catasauqua, where it interchanged with the Central Railroad of New Jersey and Lehigh Valley Railroad. The line opened in 1914 and was partially abandoned in 1961 on the Lehigh and New England Railroad's bankruptcy and closure. Conrail abandoned the remainder in the 1990s.

== History ==
The history of the Catasauqua Branch begins with the Lehigh Crane Iron Company, whose first furnace began operating in Catasauqua in 1840. The company owned railroad trackage surrounding its facilities, including a bridge across the Lehigh River to West Catasauqua, where it interchanged with the Catasauqua and Fogelsville Railroad (later part of the Reading Company system) and the Lehigh Valley Railroad. The company also interchanged with the Lehigh and Susquehanna Railroad (later part of the Central Railroad of New Jersey) on the east bank of the Lehigh after the L&S's completion in 1867.

The Empire Steel and Iron Company acquired Crane in 1899, and in 1905 created the Crane Railroad to operate the industrial trackage in Catasauqua. Between 1911 and 1912, the Crane Railroad constructed a spur east from Catasauqua a slag dump in Kurtz' Valley; this line included a 735 feet (224 m) tunnel. The Lehigh and New England Railroad (L&NE), whose Bethlehem Branch ran north–south approximately 6 miles (9.7 km) east of Catasauqua, constructed a 5.43-mile (8.74 km) connection from that branch to the eastern end of the Crane Railroad's tracks. This extension was completed on April 1, 1914, and the L&NE acquired the Crane Railroad on September 23, 1914. The line was thereafter known as the Catasauqua Branch.

The post-World War II decline in coal traffic and the shift of cement haulage from trains to trucks led to the L&NE abandoning operations on October 31, 1961. The Central Railroad of New Jersey established the Lehigh and New England Railway to acquire some of the L&NE's lines, including 4.4 miles (7.1 km) of the Catasauqua Branch. The remainder, from Catasauqua to Schoenersville, was abandoned. This remaining section of the line served a new industrial park in Schoenersville.

The Lehigh and New England Railway suffered from cash-flow problems in the 1970s and was one of many Northeastern railroads included in Conrail in 1976. The Catasauqua Branch was one of the lines transferred to Conrail. Conrail called the line the Schoenersville Industrial Track. The remaining line was out of service by 1991 and has since been abandoned.
