= Broad Run Reservoir =

Reservoir in Carbon County, Pennsylvania

- Fourth Hollow Reservoir
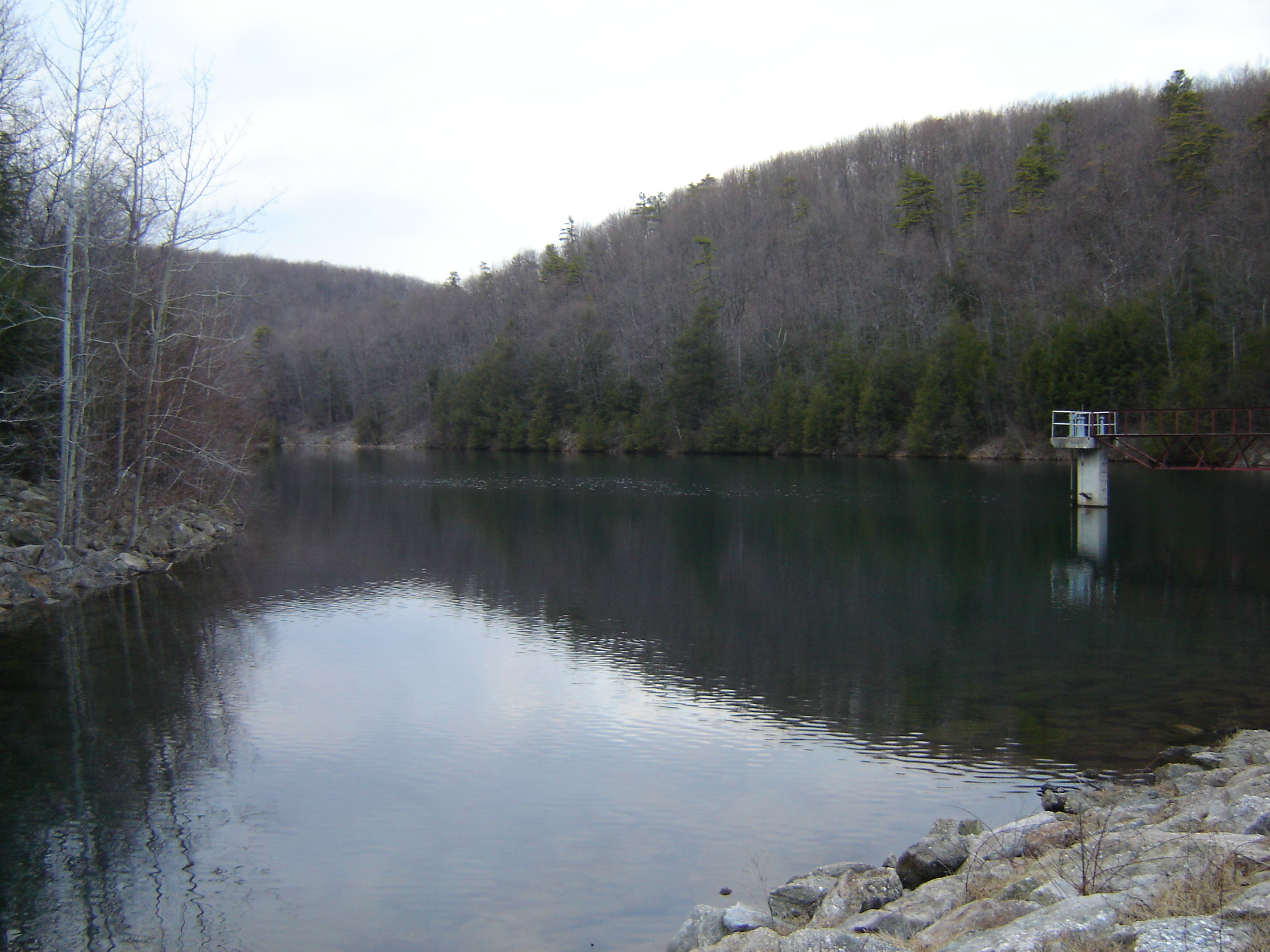
- The reservoir as seen from the top of the dam

- Location within Pennsylvania
- Interactive map of Broad Run Reservoir
- Location: Nesquehoning, Pennsylvania
- Coordinates: 40°52′08″N 75°52′05″W
- Type: Reservoir
- River sources: Broad Run
- Primary outflows: Nesquehoning Creek
- Built: 1971
- Surface area: 5 acres (2.0 ha)
- Max. depth: 35 feet (11 m)
- Water volume: 127 million US gallons (480,000 m^{3})
- Surface elevation: 1,217 feet (371 m)
- References: U.S. Geological Survey Geographic Names Information System: Broad Run Reservoir

Broad Run Reservoir, or Fourth Hollow Reservoir, is a reservoir located in the Broad Mountain within the Borough of Nesquehoning, Pennsylvania. It was built between 1970 and 1971.

The reservoir can hold approximately 127 million US gallons (480,000 m^{3}) of water and is approximately 35 feet (11 m) deep at its deepest point. it covers 5 acres (2.0 ha) at an elevation of 1,217 feet (371 m). It provides drinking water for the Borough of Nesquehoning.

Water released from the reservoir flows into the Nesquehoning Creek.

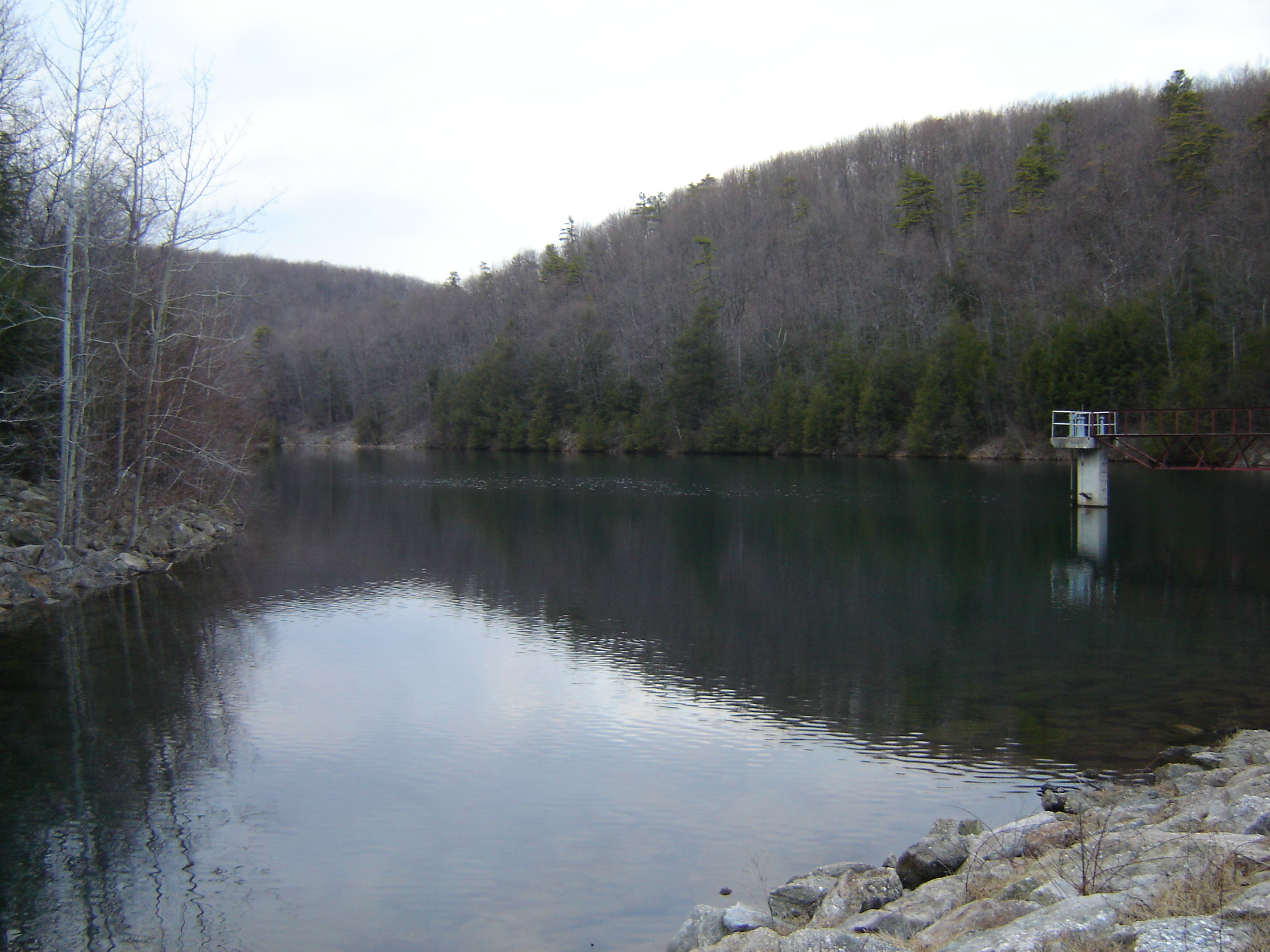
Picture of Reservoir On top of Dam

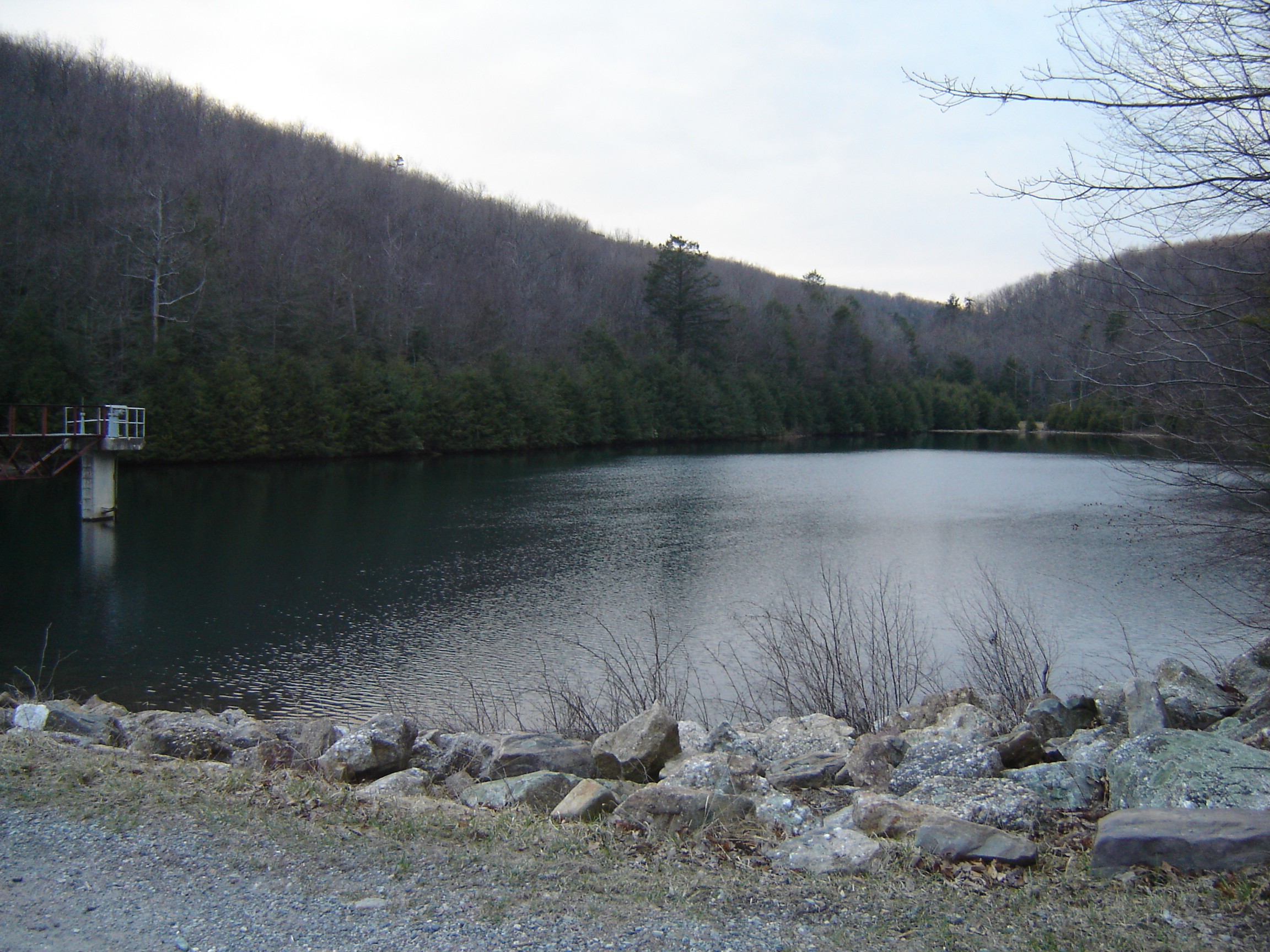
Picture of Reservoir On top of Dam

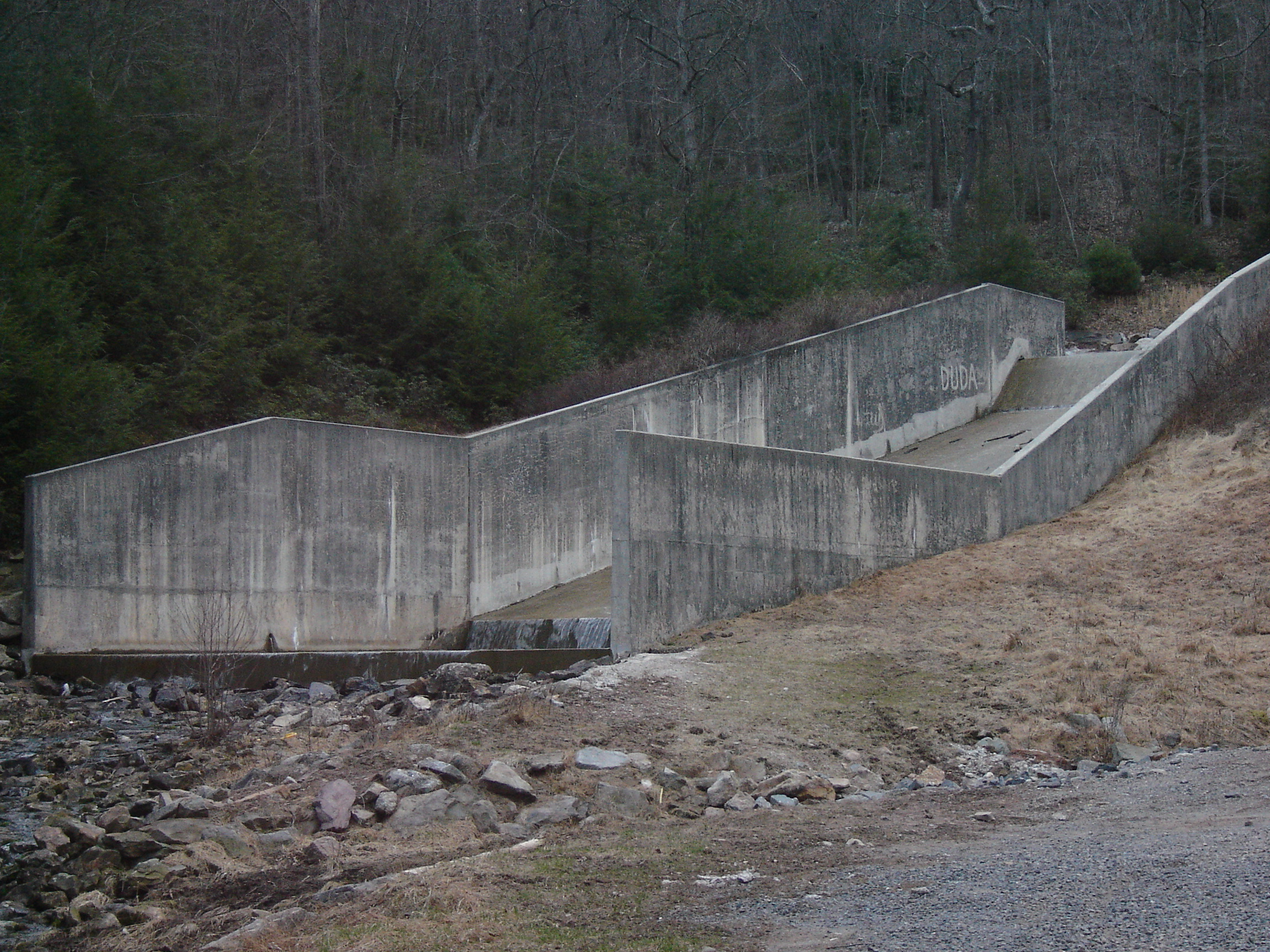
Picture of spillway

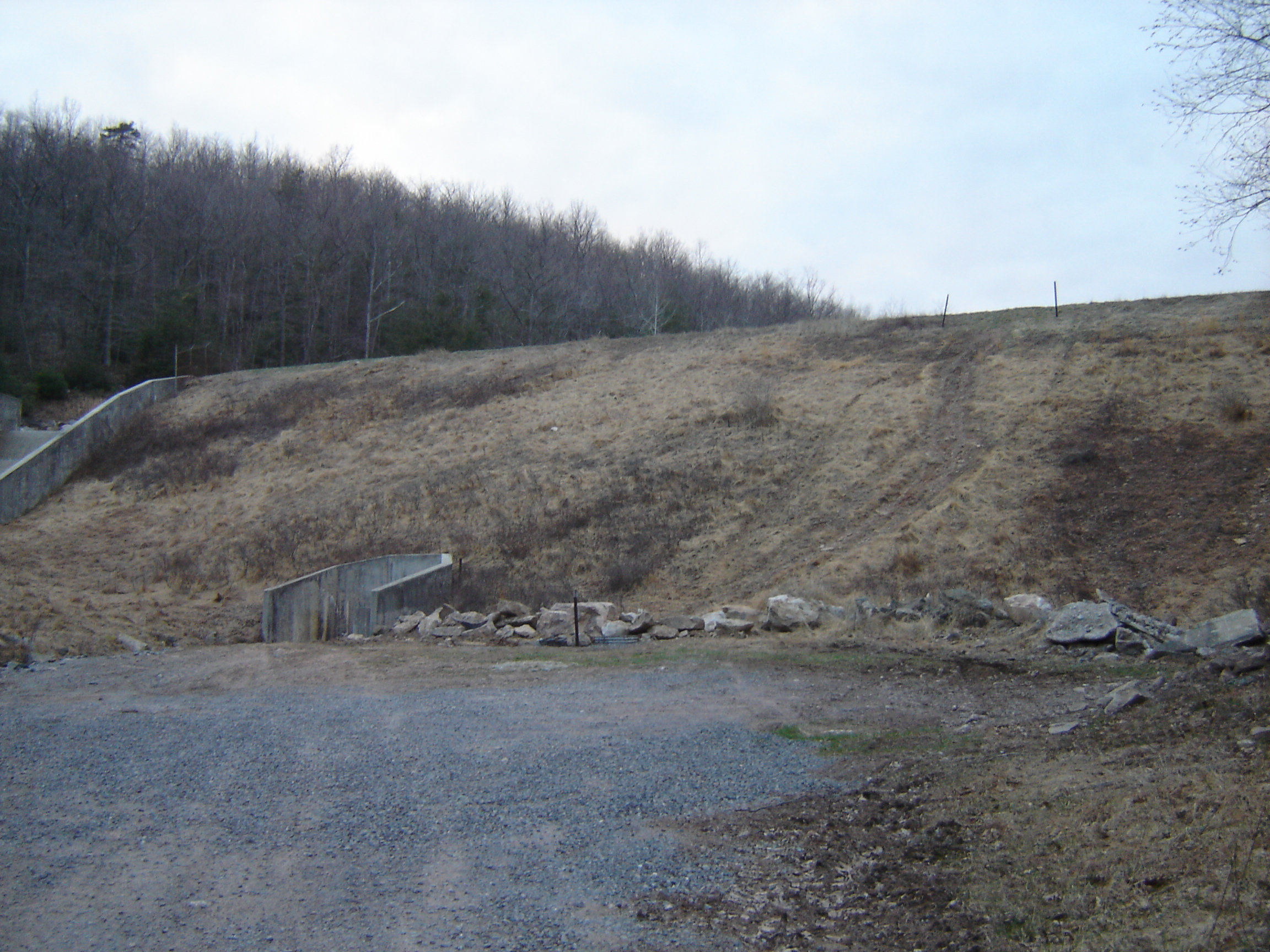
Picture of the dam

== See also ==
- Nesquehoning Creek
