= Lehigh and New England Railroad =

Railroad in the Northeastern US

Lehigh & New England Railroad
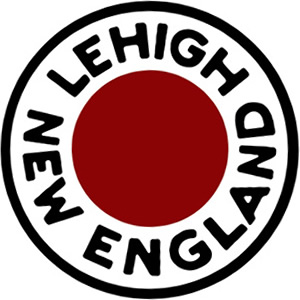
- Map of the Lehigh and New England Railroad routes

Overview
- Headquarters: Philadelphia, Pennsylvania, U.S.
- Reporting mark: LNE
- Locale: New Jersey; New York; Pennsylvania
- Dates of operation: 1895–1961
- Successor: Central Railroad of New Jersey

Technical
- Track gauge: 4 ft 8 1/2 in (1,435 mm) standard gauge
- Length: 217 miles (349 kilometers)

The Lehigh and New England Railroad (reporting mark LNE) was a Class I railroad located in Northeastern United States that acted as a bridge line. It was the second notable U.S. railroad to file for abandonment in its entirety after the New York, Ontario and Western Railway. It was headquartered in Philadelphia.

== History ==
=== South Mountain and Boston and successors: 1873-1882 ===
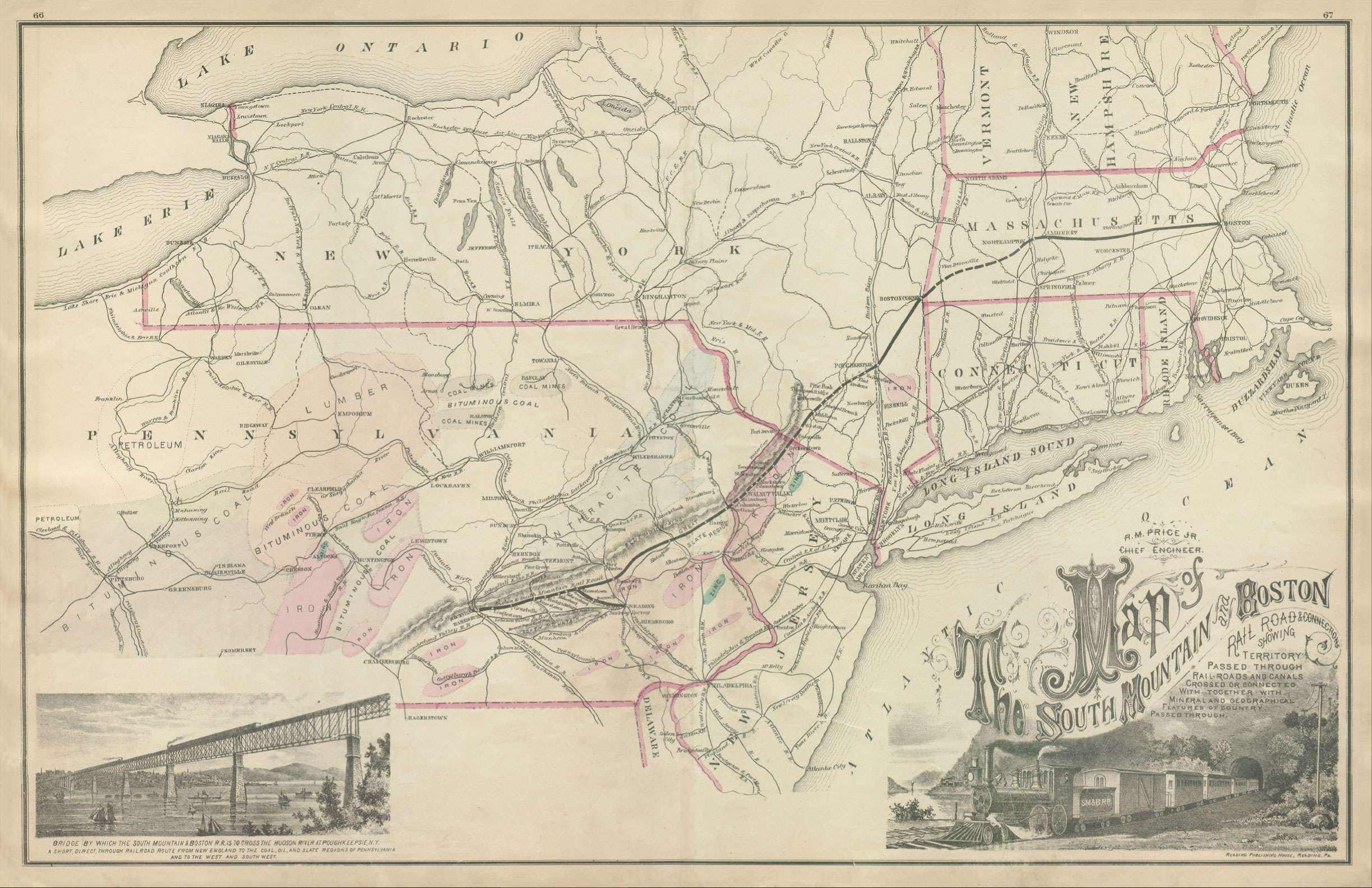
An 1876 map of the Lehigh and New England Railroad

Around 1868, serious proposals for the crossing of the Hudson River at Poughkeepsie began to appear. A charter for the Poughkeepsie Bridge Company was obtained in 1871, and the company was organized before the end of May. The charter was amended to allow placing piers in the river by 1872 (despite fierce opposition from navigation interests), and the company began raising funds. Through the influence of Andrew Carnegie, Pennsylvania Railroad president J. Edgar Thomson was persuaded to invest in the project.

This funding led to a surge of activity. The line was to be carried from Harrisburg to the crossing of the Delaware River at Portland by the South Mountain Railroad. The South Mountain and Boston Railroad was chartered in New Jersey on March 13, 1873, and also in New York to continue the line via Poughkeepsie and Boston Corners to the Massachusetts state line. At the state line, an extension of the planned Massachusetts Central Railroad would connect, taking traffic to Boston. Grading began on the various lines, known as the South Mountain and Boston Railroad, and the cornerstone was laid for a bridge pier at Poughkeepsie. However, the Panic of 1873 and the death of Thomson in May 1874 and loss of his personal support brought the project to a halt.

An attempt at revival was made in 1879. By this time the South Mountain Railroad had collapsed; a new railroad, the Pennsylvania, Poughkeepsie and New England Railroad, was incorporated on May 6, 1879, to follow its route from Harrisburg to South Mountain and the Boston connection in Portland. This company too would be short-lived; the South Mountain and Boston's New Jersey Division was renamed on March 11, 1880, to the Pennsylvania and New England Railroad, and that company's Pennsylvania Division was incorporated on May 5, 1880. The property of the PP&NE was sold to the P&NE (PA Division) on October 13, 1880. This does not improve the fortunes of this segment of the line; a third company, the Delaware and Slatington Railroad, was incorporated on September 9, 1881, to run from the P&NE (NJ Division) at Portland to Slatington on the Lehigh River. P&NE's New Jersey Division merged with the Delaware and Slatington on June 22, 1882, to form the Pennsylvania, Slatington and New England Railroad.

=== Pennsylvania construction: 1880-1891 ===
In the meantime, the P&NE (PA Division) was successful in laying one and one-sixth mile (2 km) of track to the east of Wind Gap about 1880. However, it was foreclosed on July 25, 1881, and reorganized as the Susquehanna and Delaware River Railroad on August 23, 1881; it was foreclosed again and reorganized on July 13, 1886, as the Harrisburg and New England Railroad was supposedly reorganized as the Harrisburg and Eastern Railroad on July 31, 1891.

=== Pennsylvania, Slatington and New England Railroad: 1882-1887 ===
The Pennsylvania, Slatington and New England Railroad was formed June 22, 1882, as a consolidation of the Pennsylvania and New England Railroad (NJ Division) and Delaware and Slatington Railroad, to build from Slatington, Pennsylvania, to Pine Island, New York. In December of that year, John L. Blair, who controlled the nearby Bangor and Portland Railway, acquired control of the PS&NE, in order to give the B&P direct access to New England and other points. Additionally the Central Railroad of New Jersey's Lehigh and Lackawanna Railroad could no longer access points on the B&P.

Construction was carried out through 1883, with grading finished in Pennsylvania and about 12 miles west from Sussex, New Jersey. The bridge over the Delaware River at Portland was built, and rails were laid for about half of the length in Pennsylvania. In early 1883, a dispute erupted with the Wind Gap and Delaware Railroad over the tracks between Pen Argyl and Bangor, which the PS&NE wanted to use. Later that year the company went bankrupt and construction stopped.

=== Pennsylvania, Poughkeepsie and Boston Railroad: 1887-1895 ===
The Pennsylvania, Slatington and New England Railroad was sold at foreclosure to William W. Gibbs, president of the Poughkeepsie Bridge Company, on July 12, 1887, and was reorganized as the Pennsylvania, Poughkeepsie and Boston Railroad, also known as the "Pickles, Pork, and Beans" Line). Construction was begun, but the company again went bankrupt, and was sold at foreclosure December 14, 1894.

Around that time, various other companies were chartered to build the line over the Poughkeepsie Bridge, and in 1889, the Central New England and Western Railroad was completed. That part would be combined with the PS&NE in 1892 by the Philadelphia and Reading Railway, but in 1893 the two parts were split. The eastern section later became part of the New York, New Haven and Hartford Railroad, and the western section stayed independent to the end.

The Campbell Hall Connecting Railroad was chartered April 3, 1889, to obtain the right to operate the section in New York. It was originally planned to extend beyond Pine Island to Campbell Hall, the west end of the existing Poughkeepsie Bridge line.

The Philadelphia and Reading Railway gained control of the Central New England and Western Railroad in early 1892, and the PP&B soon after, giving it a route from Reading via the Schuylkill and Lehigh Railroad to Slatington, and then to New England along its new acquisitions. The Reading Company's bankruptcy in 1893 ended this control, and led to the PP&B's bankruptcy.

=== Lehigh and New England Railroad: 1895-1961 ===
Revenue freight traffic, in millions of net ton-miles
Year	Traffic
1925	348
1933	244
1944	550
1956	338
1960	143

The Lehigh and New England Railroad (L&NE) was organized April 2, 1895, as the successor to the PP&B. The route from Slatington to Pine Island was accomplished but not completed. The L&NE was able to have a route from Slatington to Pine Island even though the route wasn't completed because the L&NE had obtained trackage rights over the New York, Susquehanna and Western Railway's Sparta Junction to Columbia/Delaware Junction main line between Swartswood Junction (outside of Swartswood) and Hainesburg Junction; this line was built by the New Jersey Midland Railway from Sparta Junction to Blairstown, New Jersey, and by the Blairstown Railway from Blairstown, New Jersey, to Columbia/Delaware Junction and today serves as the Paulinskill Valley Trail. Despite that, a tunnel (40°58′44″N 74°46′1″W) was built under the fill for the Delaware, Lackawanna and Western Railroad's New Jersey Cut-Off (opened 1911) in case the L&NE ever decided to complete its own line. Additionally, the planned route from Pine Island to Campbell Hall was cancelled, and trackage rights were obtained over the Erie Railroad's Goshen and Deckertown Railroad and Montgomery and Erie Railroad.

The Lehigh and Lackawanna Railroad and its leased Wind Gap and Delaware Railroad were operated by the Central Railroad of New Jersey until February 1, 1905, when the two companies were merged into the L&NE. Around the same time the L&NE acquired the Northampton Railroad. This gave the L&NE a branch to Bethlehem, with a branch off that one to Martins Creek. Part of the main line between Benders Junction (the crossing of the original L&NE and the L&L) and Pen Argyl was abandoned in 1905, with the new route using the L&L and WG&D.

The Lehigh Coal and Navigation Company (LC&N) gained control of the L&NE on May 9, 1904.

A yard at Maybrook, New York, opened in 1912, with L&NE trains terminating there via a section of the Central New England Railway.

On July 24, 1912, a new extension opened, splitting from the main line at Danielsville, Pennsylvania, and running west to Tamaqua to directly serve the LC&N. On December 14, 1913, the L&NE acquired the Panther Creek Railroad, running east from Tamaqua to Summit Hill, and with a connection to the Central Railroad of New Jersey's Hauto Tunnel for access to Nesquehoning obtained in 1915. The Catasauqua Branch, built in part by the Crane Railroad, was completed in 1914.

On June 4, 1926, the Reading Company leased the L&NE, but other railroads objected, and the Interstate Commerce Commission rejected the lease, preferring a lease by the New York, New Haven and Hartford Railroad (which was never done).

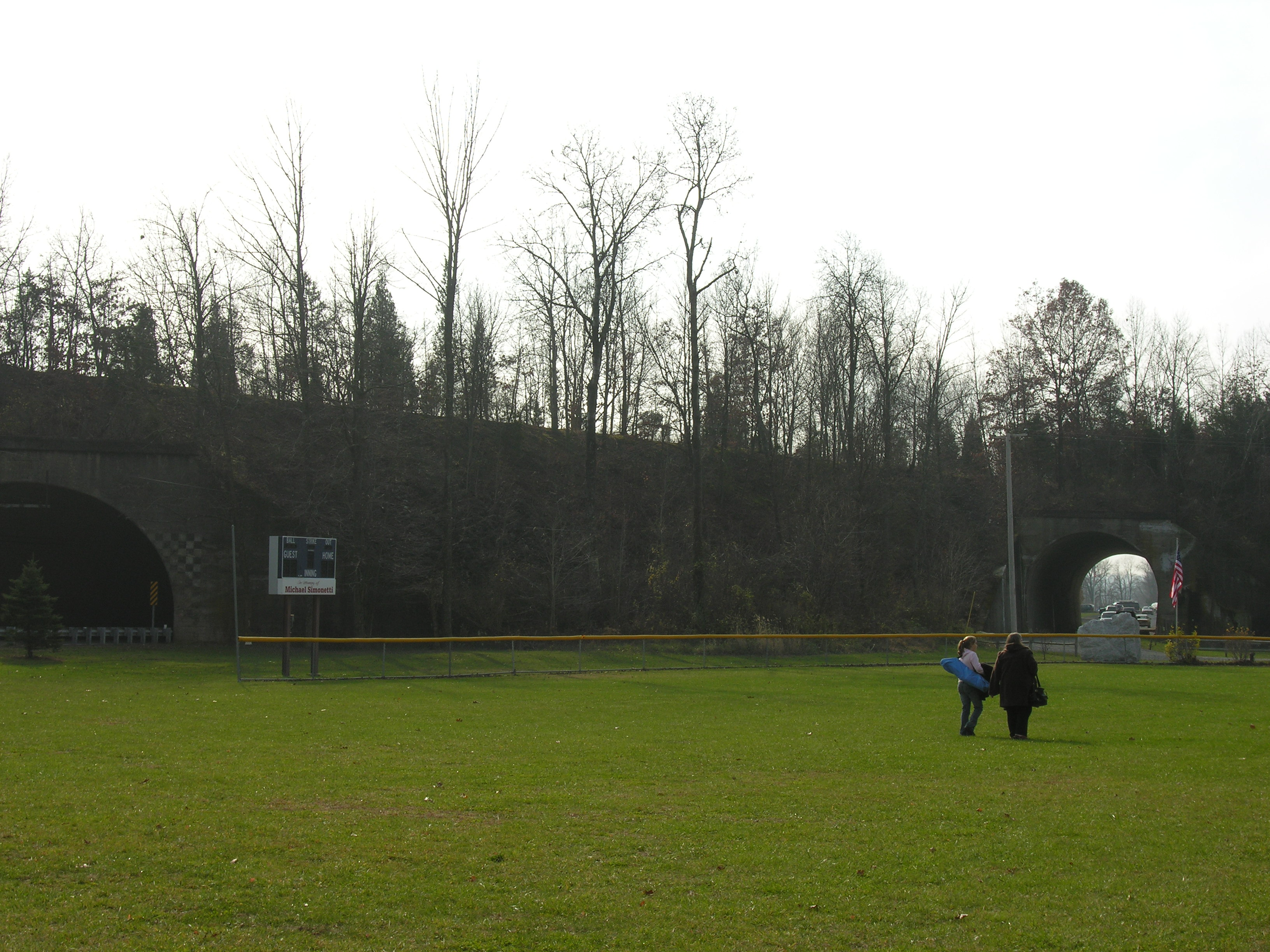
The never-used tunnel (at right) for the Lehigh & New England under the now-abandoned Lackawanna Cut-Off. NJ Route 94 uses the tunnel on the left). The tunnel is now an integral part of Knowlton's Tunnel Field, a sports and recreation area that spans the Cut-Off via this tunnel.

The LNE Board of Directors decided to end all railroad operations on October 31, 1961. Although the LNE was still profitable, the rapid decline of the anthracite coal business was seen on the horizon and the decision was made to cease operations. By this date the LNE mainline saw only one coal train per week (which usually operated on Thursdays). Trackage was removed by the following year and the bridges over the Lehigh River and Delaware River were dismantled by 1969.

While a never particularly profitable system because it paralleled the Lehigh & Hudson River Railway and did not serve any large markets, the L&NE did have a profitable cement business from its lines around Bath, Pennsylvania; the trackage which served this commodity was taken over and operated by a subsidiary of the Central Railroad of New Jersey (CNJ), Lehigh and New England Railway until January 1975 and then by the Lehigh Valley until April 1, 1976, when the trackage was absorbed by Conrail. To railfans, the L&NE is best remembered for its diesel motive power, which consisted almost entirely of models built by Alco, excepting two Whitcomb Center Cab switchers, numbers 601 & 602.

=== Lehigh and New England Railway: 1961- ===
The Lehigh and New England Railway was chartered by the Central Railroad of New Jersey to take over some of the lines in Pennsylvania. Included in that sale was the main line east from Tamaqua, the old Lehigh and Lackawanna Railroad and Northampton Railroad from Bethlehem to Martins Creek, and the branch from Bethlehem west to Allentown. A short section from Pen Argyl to Wind Gap was taken over by the Delaware, Lackawanna and Western Railroad, connecting to the DL&W's Bangor and Portland Railway at Pen Argyl.
