= Panther Creek Valley =

Coordinates: 40°50′N 75°53′W

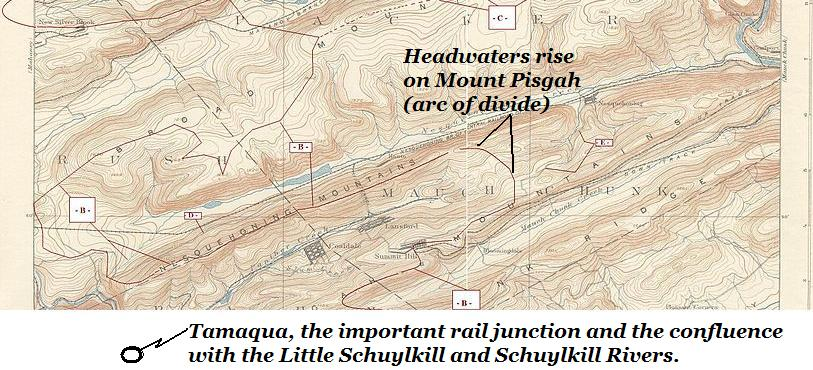
A USGS topographical map showing the Poconos' Broad Mountain, Nesquehoning Creek's valley and Nesquehoning Ridge, Panther Creek, Panther Creek Valley, Pisgah Ridge, Mauch Chunk Creek Valley, and Mauch Chunk Ridge

Panther Creek Valley was historically the site of mining towns in eastern Pennsylvania. Since 1992, the Panther Creek Valley Foundation has managed the Number Nine Coal Mine and Museum in Lansford, Pennsylvania.

Geologically, Panther Creek Valley lies between and over the Anthracite ladened folds of the two long near parallel ridgelines, Nesquehoning and Pisgah Ridges forming the side walls and supplying the wealth which shipped from the Panther Creek Valley making the region historically important, as for several decades its land owners, Lehigh Coal & Navigation Company (LC&N) held a virtual monopoly on Anthracite produced and shipped not only to eastern U.S. Cities via the Lehigh Canal, but to transoceanic markets.

The Little Schuylkill River, a tributary of Panther Creek, was historically important due to its role in energy transportation in a key region central to the American Industrial Revolution from the 1820s through the 1870s, and remained important as an energy producing region until the American steel industry began its rapid decline in the 1980s.
