= Pisgah Mountain =

Ridgeline in Pennsylvania

Coordinates: 40°49′7″N 75°52′40″W

Highest point
- Elevation: 1,611 ft (491 m)
- Prominence: 500 ft (150 m)

Geography
- Location: Carbon and Schuylkill counties, Pennsylvania, U.S.
- Parent range: Appalachian Mountains
- Topo map(s): USGS Tamaqua, Nesquehoning and Lehighton quadrangles

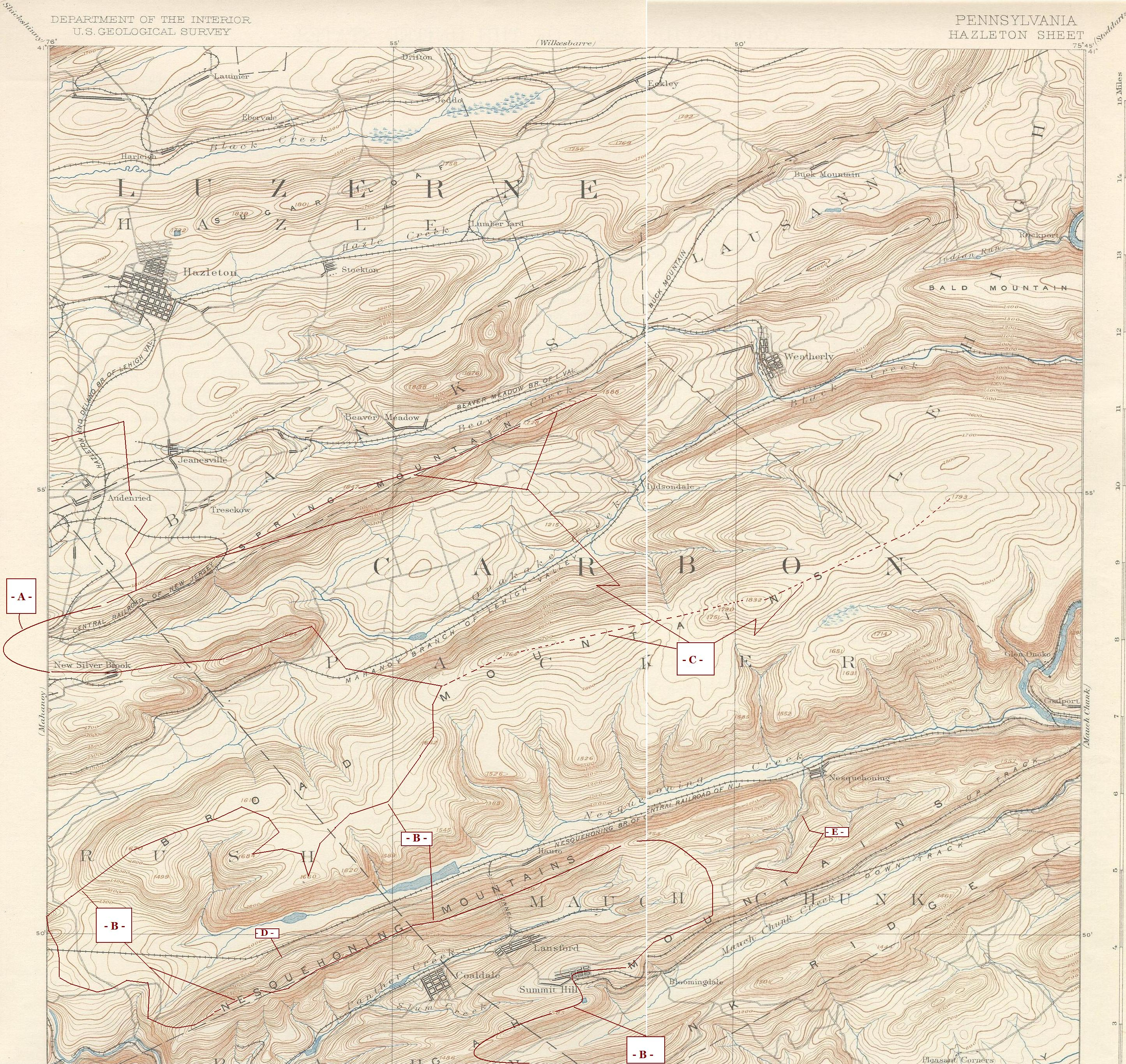
Coal-laden parallel ridges north of Blue Mountain in the physiographic province of the "Anthracite Upland Section"

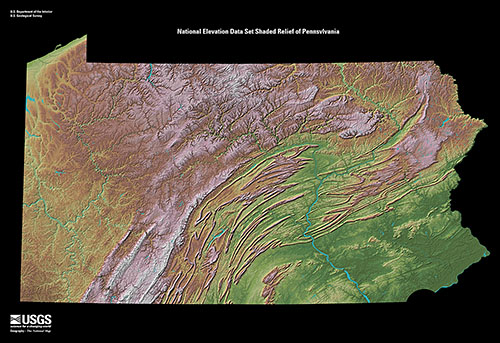
The barrier ridgelines of the mountain is clear as the Alleghenies turn to cross to eastern Pennsylvania.

Pisgah Mountain, or Pisgah Ridge on older USGS maps, is a ridgeline running 12.5 miles (20.1 km) from Tamaqua to Jim Thorpe, Pennsylvania from the Little Schuylkill River water gap to the Lehigh River water gap.

The mountain runs north-northeast to south-southwest, and its north-side valley is followed by U.S. Route 209 from river gap to river gap. The ridge is a succession of peaks exceeding 1,440 feet (438.9 m) rising 300 to 540 feet (91 to 165 m) above the boroughs of Lansford, Coaldale, and Tamaqua in the Panther Creek valley. The highest point on Pisgah Mountain is at 1,611 feet (491 m) in the borough of Summit Hill, which sits atop the ridge. Near Summit Hill was the "Sharpe Mountain" (peak) where in 1791 Phillip Ginter is documented as having discovered anthracite, leading to the formation of the Lehigh Coal Mine Company. In 1818 the Lehigh Coal Company took over the mines, and the mining camp gradually became a settlement and grew into Summit Hill.

Pisgah Ridge forms the left bank drainage divide of Panther Creek to its south and the stream's source in Summit Hill. The peak at the east end of the ridge is named Mount Pisgah and represents a hard rock knob that towers 800 feet (240 m) above the Lehigh River to the east.

Pisgah Ridge is entirely in the Delaware River watershed. The western part of the north side of the ridge feeds Panther Creek running to the west as a Little Schuylkill River tributary, while the eastern part of the north side drains to Nesquehoning Creek, a tributary of the Lehigh River, which flows past the east end of the mountain. The eastern end of the south side of the mountain drains into the valley of Mauch Chunk Creek (White Bear Creek), while the western part of the south side drains to Owl Creek, which flows west to the Little Schuylkill.

Mount Pisgah is joined by Nesquehoning Mountain, a ridge of similar height, near their eastern end, at a 1,540-foot (470 m) summit between the centers of Jim Thorpe and Nesquehoning. The bulk of Nesquehoning Mountain is separated from Mount Pisgah proper by a short and very steep valley that US-209 climbs from the borough of Nesquehoning westwards 2–3 miles (3–5 km) to reach the head of the Panther Creek valley in Lansford.

The railroad tracks paralleling PA-54 also transiting the town of Nesquehoning's flat river-bank terrain takes over 16 miles (26 km) farther to climb and descend to once again reach an elevation where it can turn to enter the Panther Creek Valley near the confluence with the Little Schuylkill via the rail yard at Tamaqua in a longer more circuitous climb—and demonstration why dump trucks have replaced railroads in short-haul situations.

== Geology ==
Mount Pisgah is a typical end-ridge formed by a watercourse gap. Pisgah Mountain is but one average folded mountain in a succession of near parallel ridgelines, where each are made by a succession of peaks of nearly the same height. This Ridge and Valley province is a geological feature that extends from New Jersey into Virginia forming a great barrier of successive valleys. Pisgah Mountain, located along the southern fringe of northeastern Pennsylvania's Poconos region is also central to the Southern Anthracite Region of Pennsylvania— known as the site of the Richest Anthracite Seam, in the heart of the Southern Pennsylvania Anthracite Field and the geological province known as the Anthracite Upland section. The ridgeline parallels the escarpment of the Blue Mountain region but unlike that barrier with several major cuttings, Mount Pisgah is a divide between waters running southwesterly in the historic Panther Creek (Pennsylvania).

== Reference works ==
- Alan R. Geyer (1979) "Outstanding Geologic Features of Pennsylvania", Geological Survey of Pennsylvania
- Tom Thwaites (1997) "50 hikes in Eastern Pennsylvania", Third edition
- Art Michaels (2003) "Pennsylvania Overlooks a guide for Sightseers and Outdoor People", Penn State Press
- "Latitude and Longitude from TopoQuest". TopoQuest.com.
