= Nesquehoning High School =

- U.S. National Register of Historic Places
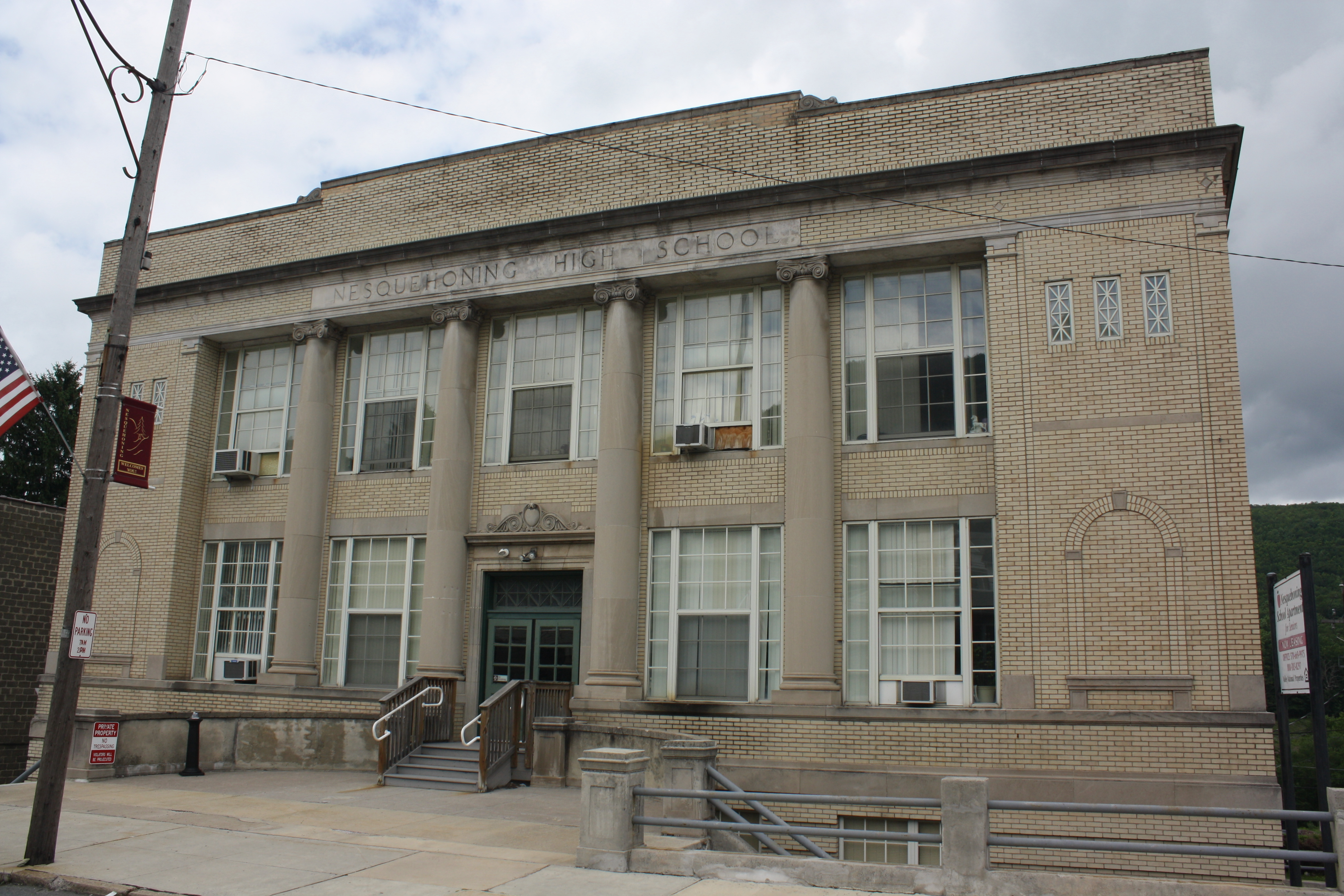
- Nesquehoning High School. July 2013.

- Location within Pennsylvania Location within the United States
- Location: 120-124 E. Catawissa St., Nesquehoning, Pennsylvania, U.S.
- Coordinates: 40°51′55″N 75°48′34″W
- Area: less than one acre
- Built: 1917–1919
- Built by: Simpson, Tucker and Marsh; Shamokin Lumber and Manufacturing
- Architectural style: Classical Revival
- NRHP reference No.: 03001187
- Added to NRHP: November 21, 2003

Nesquehoning High School is an historic high school in Nesquehoning, Pennsylvania, United States. It was added to the National Register of Historic Places in 2003.

== History and architectural features ==
Built between 1917 and 1919, this historic structure is a four-story, seven-bay, school building that was designed in the Classical Revival style. It was built using structural terra cotta and faced with Roman brick. It measures 75 feet wide and 135 feet deep. The school closed in the 1960s and was renovated into apartments in 1998.
