= Packer Township, Pennsylvania =

Township in Pennsylvania, US

Packer Township
- Township
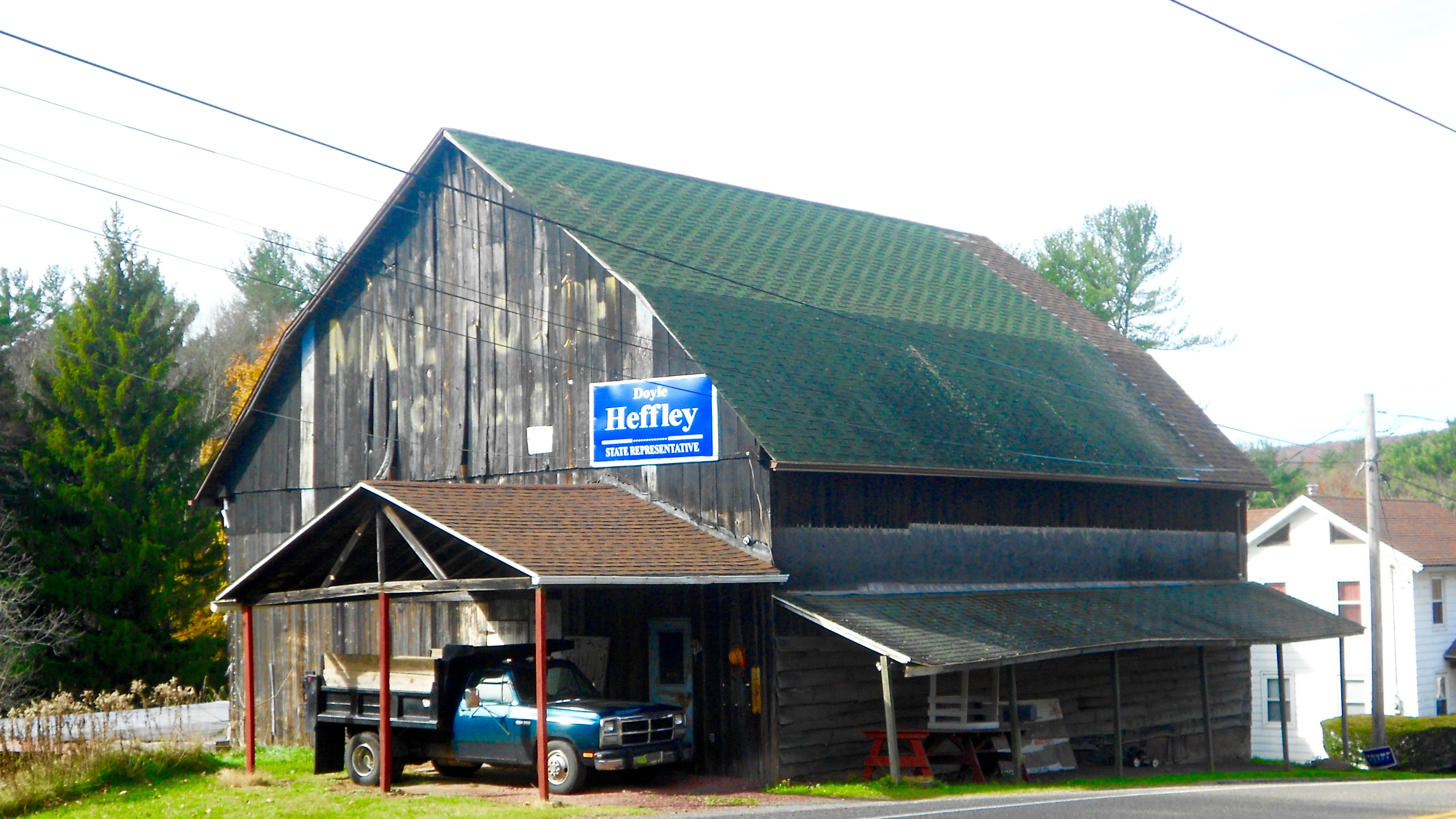
- Mail Pouch barn near Hudsondale, November 2016

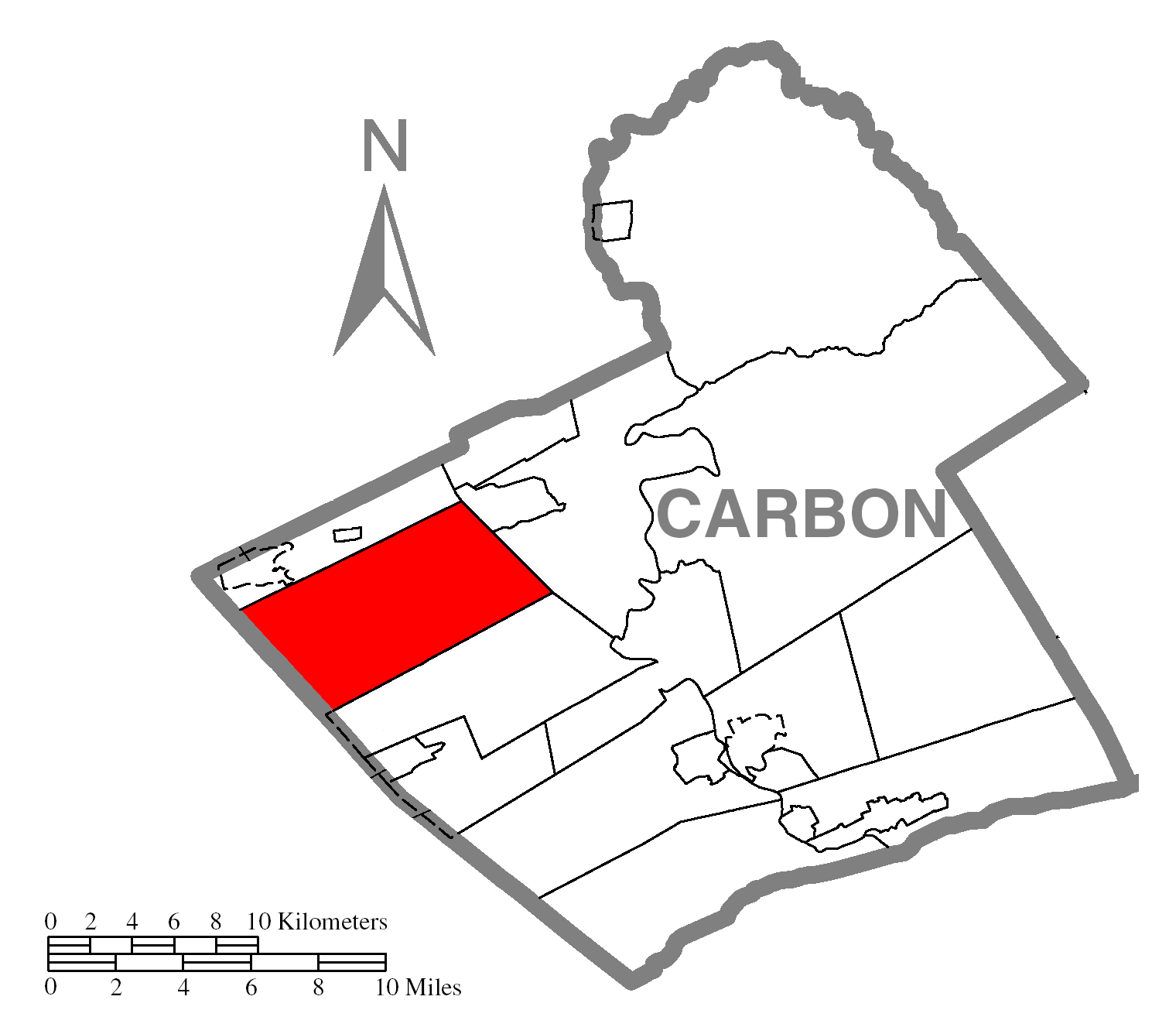
- Location of Packer Township in Carbon County

- Location of Carbon County in Pennsylvania
- Coordinates: 40°52′29″N 75°54′59″W
- Country: United States
- State: Pennsylvania
- County: Carbon

Area
  - Total: 27.93 sq mi (72.35 km^{2})
  - Land: 27.93 sq mi (72.35 km^{2})
  - Water: 0 sq mi (0.00 km^{2})
- Elevation: 1,637 ft (499 m)

Population (2010)
  - Total: 998
  - Estimate (2016): 984
  - Density: 35/sq mi (13.6/km^{2})
- Time zone: UTC-5 (EST)
  - Summer (DST): UTC-4 (EDT)
- Area code: 570
- FIPS code: 42-025-57504
- Website: https://packertownship.com/

Packer Township is a township in Carbon County, Pennsylvania. It is part of Northeastern Pennsylvania. The population was 998 at the 2010 census.

== Geography ==
The township is in the western part of Carbon County and is bounded by Schuylkill County on the west. According to the United States Census Bureau, the township has a total area of 27.9 square miles (72.3 km^{2}), all of it land. It is in the Delaware River watershed and is drained by Quakake Creek, a tributary of the Lehigh River, except for a portion in the southwest that is drained by the Schuylkill River via Still Creek and the Little Schuylkill River. Its villages include Gerhards, Hudsondale, and Stewarts.

Broad Mountain, reaching an elevation of 1,804 feet (550 m) above sea level, occupies the southern half of the township, while Spring Mountain is along the northern border and has a high point of 1,913 feet (583 m). Between the two mountains is the valley of Quakake Creek, the settled part of the township, with elevations from 1,050 to 1,300 feet (320 to 400 m).

Packer has a warm-summer humid continental climate (Dfb) and the hardiness zones are 5b and 6a. Average monthly temperatures in Hudsondale range from 24.9 °F in January to 69.7 °F in July.

=== Neighboring municipalities ===
- Banks Township (north)
- Weatherly (northeast)
- Lehigh Township (east)
- Nesquehoning (south)
- Rush Township, Schuylkill County (southwest)
- Kline Township, Schuylkill County (west)

== Demographics ==
Historical population
Census	Pop.	Note	%±
1850	291		—
1860	357		22.7%
1870	441		23.5%
1880	496		12.5%
1890	665		34.1%
1900	684		2.9%
1910	717		4.8%
1920	514		−28.3%
1930	511		−0.6%
1940	577		12.9%
1950	529		−8.3%
1960	528		−0.2%
1970	646		22.3%
1980	813		25.9%
1990	918		12.9%
2000	986		7.4%
2010	998		1.2%
2020	1,029		3.1%
U.S. Decennial Census

As of the census of 2000, there were 986 people, 372 households, and 274 families residing in the township. The population density was 34.2 inhabitants per square mile (13.2/km^{2}). There were 407 housing units at an average density of 14.1/sq mi (5.5/km^{2}). The racial makeup of the township was 98.17% White, 0.10% Native American, 0.20% Asian, 0.20% from other races, and 1.32% from two or more races. Hispanic or Latino of any race were 0.10% of the population.

There were 372 households. Of the households surveyed, 32.0% had children under the age of 18 living with them, 64.0% were married couples living together, 6.7% had a female householder with no husband present, and 26.1% were non-families. 21.8% of all households were made up of individuals, and 9.9% had someone living alone who was 65 years of age or older. The average household size was 2.62 and the average family size was 3.08.

In the township, the population was spread out, with 23.9% under the age of 18, 4.7% from 18 to 24, 29.7% from 25 to 44, 24.1% from 45 to 64, and 17.5% who were 65 years of age or older. The median age was 41 years. For every 100 females, there were 98.4 males. For every 100 females age 18 and over, there were 100.0 males.

The median income for a household in the township was $39,038, and the median income for a family was $43,250. Males had a median income of $31,111 versus $21,181 for females. The per capita income for the township was $17,038. About 3.3% of families and 7.2% of the population were below the poverty line, including 1.7% of those under age 18 and 12.7% of those age 65 or over.

== Transportation ==
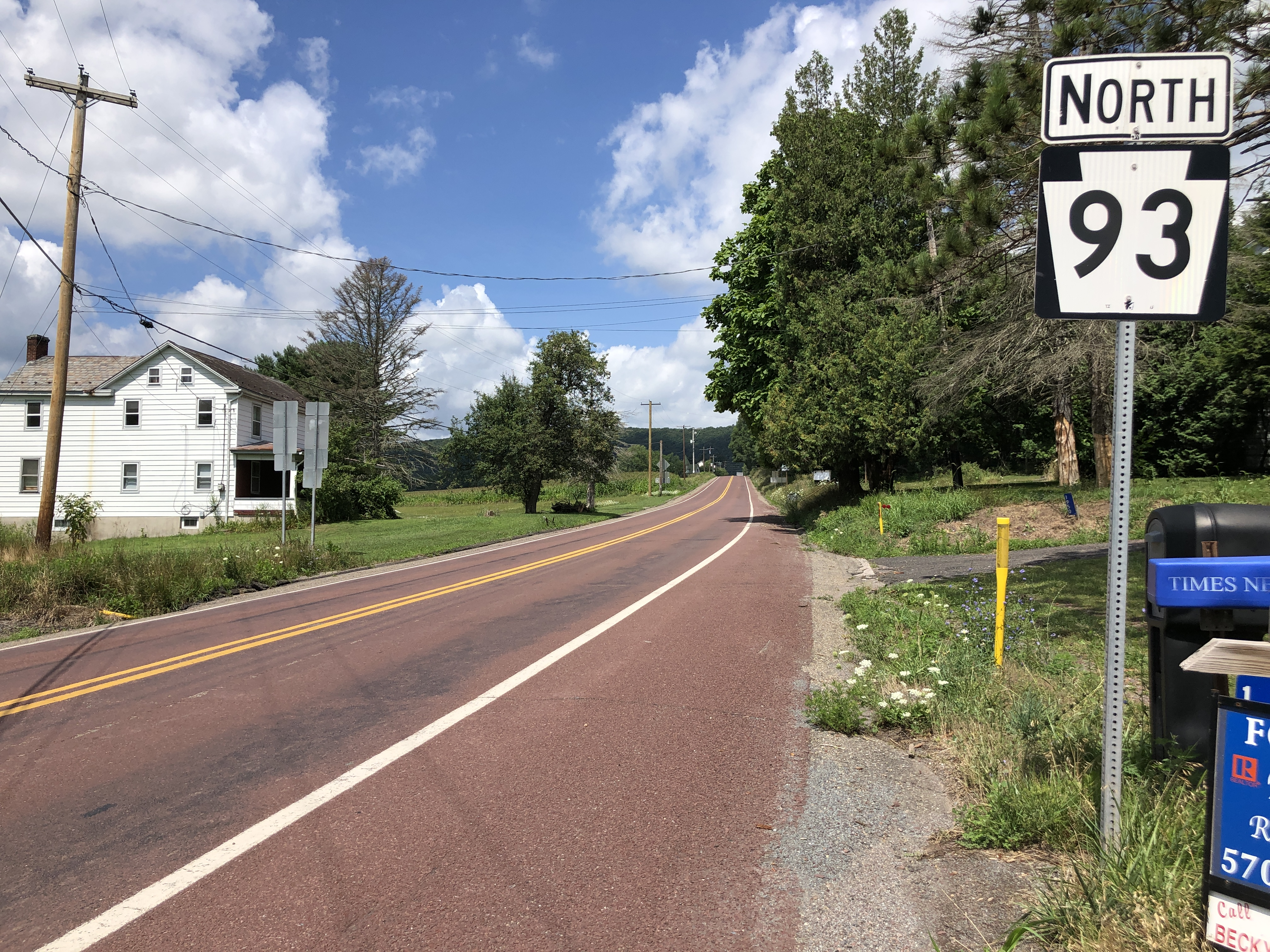
PA 93 northbound in Packer Township

As of 2007, there were 25.26 miles (40.65 km) of public roads in Packer Township, of which 15.88 miles (25.56 km) were maintained by the Pennsylvania Department of Transportation (PennDOT) and 9.38 miles (15.10 km) were maintained by the township.

Pennsylvania Route 93 is the only numbered highway passing through Packer Township. It follows a northwest-southeast alignment through the northeastern portion of the township, crossing Quakake Creek in Hudsondale and leading northwest across Spring Mountain 7 miles (11 km) to Hazleton and southeast across Broad Mountain 8 miles (13 km) to Jim Thorpe, the Carbon County seat.
