= Panther Creek (Little Schuylkill River tributary) =

River in Pennsylvania, US

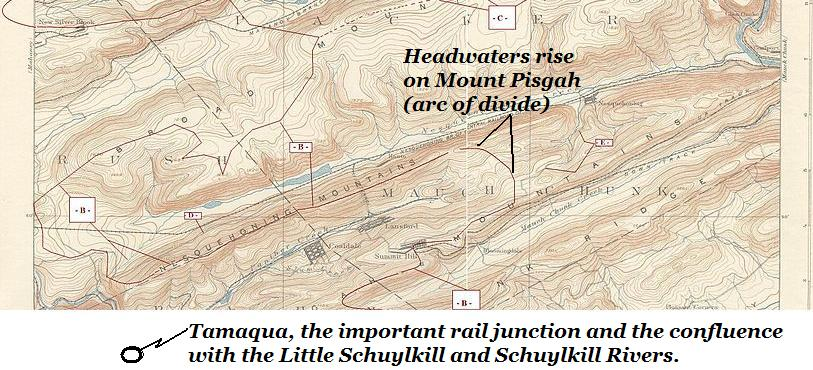

Physical characteristics
- Source
  - location: Over the Lehigh Valley drainage divide due west of Palmerton, Pennsylvania below Mount Pisgah (below the join of Pisgah Ridge with Nesquehoning Mountain and Mauch Chunk Mountain).
- Mouth
  - location: Little Schuylkill River at Tamaqua, Pennsylvania
  - coordinates: 40°47′46″N 75°57′58″W
- Length: c. 8 mi (13 km)

Panther Creek is a two branch creek running through parts of Schuylkill and Carbon County. The west-draining branch tributary of the Little Schuylkill River's drainage basin and rises in the vicinity of the east side of Lansford and Coaldale in the plateau-like nearly flat terrain of the complex three-way saddle between Mount Pisgah. It continues to flow through the towns of Coaldale into Tamaqua where it meets the Little Schuylkill River. The Panther Creek branch to its east, Nesquehoning Ridge to the north and Pisgah Ridge to the south, both ridgelines flanking its entire course as it makes its way east-northeast to west-southwest. Starting in Nesquehoning it eventually runs into the Lehigh River just outside of Jim Thorpe.

The creek's valley to the west is historically and industrially important having been mostly owned by the historically significant Lehigh Coal & Navigation Company which eventually built the Panther Creek Railroad from Lansford to Tamaqua and the Hauto Tunnel to haul coal from the copious anthracite deposits, collieries, and coal breakers along an easier route than up and over the mountains to Jim Thorpe and the Lehigh Canal via Summit Hill and the Mauch Chunk & Summit Hill Railway, North America's second-oldest operational railroad and its first Gravity and Switchback railroads. The west branch of Panther Creek (Lansford/Coaldale) has been heavily polluted with acid mine drainage over the years and mysteriously has even gone dry in the last few months of 2024, which should not happen by any act of nature. While no care has ever been given to the high potential west branch of Panther Creek. Great care has gone into cleaning the acid mine drainage of the east branch of Panther Creek in Nesquehoning and it has turned into a prime trout fishery over the years as it makes its way to meet the Lehigh River.

The coal seams of the valley were the first deposits discovered and exploited by any company beginning with surface deposits along the south ridge leading to the founding of Summit Hill, then Lansford in western Carbon County, then the downstream towns of Coaldale and Tamaqua in eastern Schuylkill County.

The new company, a leaned-down and reorganized Lehigh Coal and Navigation Company still mines the coal deposits in the valley and owns all of its mineral rights.

== See also ==
- List of rivers of Pennsylvania
