= Lehigh and Lackawanna Railroad =

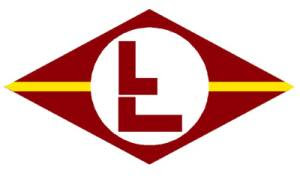

Overview
- Locale: Lehigh Valley
- Dates of operation: 1864–1904
- Predecessor: Bethlehem Railroad
- Successor: Lehigh and New England Railroad

Technical
- Track gauge: 1,435 mm (4 ft 8 1/2 in)
- Length: 25.3 miles (40.7 km)

The Lehigh and Lackawanna Railroad was a railway company in the United States. It was incorporated in 1864 and opened its initial line between Bethlehem, and Chapman, Pennsylvania, in 1867. At its peak, the company's line extended 25.3 miles (40.7 km) from Bethlehem to Wind Gap, Pennsylvania. The company and its line became part of the Lehigh and New England Railroad in 1904. Part of the line was abandoned in 1962; the remainder is part of the Norfolk Southern Railway's Cement Secondary.

== History ==
The Lehigh and Lackawanna Railroad was established as the Bethlehem Railroad in 1862, for the purposes of building a railway line north from the Lehigh River in Bethlehem, Pennsylvania, following the Monocacy Creek. The line opened between Bethlehem and Chapman, north of Bath, on November 28, 1867. In Bethlehem, it interchanged with the Lehigh and Susquehanna Railroad (L&S), later part of the Central Railroad of New Jersey (CNJ). The Lehigh Coal and Navigation Company (LC&NC), owner of the L&S, leased the Lehigh and Lackawanna in 1868. The CNJ leased both the L&S and the Lehigh and Lackawanna in 1871.

Under CNJ management, the line was extended the 10 miles (16 km) from Chapman to Wind Gap, opening on August 14, 1878. At Wind Gap, connection was made with the Pennsylvania and New England Railroad, another forerunner of the Lehigh and New England. Another company, the Wind Gap and Delaware Railroad, completed a line between Wind Gap and Bangor, Pennsylvania, in 1883, creating a connection with the Delaware, Lackawanna and Western Railroad.

The company was reorganized as the Lehigh and Delaware Railroad on July 7, 1904. This existence was short-lived: the Lehigh Coal and Navigation Company consolidated its various railroad properties into the Lehigh and New England Railroad (L&NE) in December 1904. The line between Bethlehem and Benders Junction, west of Wind Gap, was known as the Bethlehem Branch of the L&NE, while the section between Benders Junction and Wind Gap was incorporated into the L&NE main line.

The post-World War II decline in coal traffic and the shift of cement haulage from trains to trucks led to the L&NE abandoning operations on October 31, 1961. The Central Railroad of New Jersey established the Lehigh and New England Railway to acquire some of the L&NE's lines, including that part of the Bethlehem Branch between Bethlehem and Bath. The remainder was abandoned in 1962. The Lehigh and New England Railway suffered from cash-flow problems in the 1970s and was one of many Northeastern railroads included in Conrail in 1976. Conrail combined the Bethlehem Branch with the remainder of the Martins Creek Branch to form the Cement Secondary between Bethlehem and Forks Township, via Nazareth, Pennsylvania. The Norfolk Southern Railway acquired the line in the 1999 split of Conrail.
