= Hauto Tunnel =

Railway tunnel in Pennsylvania, USA

Coordinates: 40°50′22″N 75°53′21″W

The Hauto Tunnel, dug in 1871–72, was a 1.1-mile-long (1.8 km) single-track railway tunnel crossing under the barrier ridge of Nesquehoning Mountain between Lansford, Pennsylvania, in the Panther Creek Valley and the Central Railroad of New Jersey trackage near the dam of the Hauto Reservoir impoundment about 1.3 miles (2.1 km) above Nesquehoning, Pennsylvania. The tunnel was significant for cutting nearly 15 difficult mountainous miles (24 km) off the trip to the Lehigh Canal terminal or, by rail, to other eastern coal companies, in the era when anthracite was the king of energy fuels.

Built as a joint venture by the Central Railroad of New Jersey and landlords Lehigh Coal & Navigation Company (LC&N Co.) shortly after the LC&N board of directors had decided to opt out of the rail transportation business and leased all the railroads it owned or controlled under subsidiary Lehigh & Susquehanna Railroad to the CNJ. (Note: LC&N would later involve itself again in several railroads, most notably the Lehigh and New England Railroad.) The tunnel began as a notion when LC&N Co. miners needed to drain water from a higher mine gallery under the Panther Creek Valley and so dug a drainage shaft from the other (north) side of Nesquehoning Ridge into the coal beds under Lansford.

Once the tracks were in operation and proven, the tunnel allowed the CNJ to seek permission from LC&N Co. to cease coal shipments to the canal head on the iconic Summit Hill & Mauch Chunk Railroad, and to sell off the asset as a common carrier and tourist railway.

== See also ==
- Lehigh Canal
- Lehigh Coal & Navigation Company
- Lehigh & Susquehanna Railroad
- Panther Creek Valley
- Summit Hill & Mauch Chunk Railroad
