= Mount Pisgah (Carbon County, Pennsylvania) =

Mountain in Pennsylvania, United States

Coordinates: 40°52′10″N 75°44′59″W

Highest point
- Elevation: 1,360 ft (410 m)

Geography
- Location: Carbon County, Pennsylvania, U.S.
- Parent range: Appalachian Mountains
- Topo map: USGS Leighton (PA) Quadrangle

Mount Pisgah is a peak in Carbon County, Pennsylvania situated north-northwest from and looming over the right bank business district in downtown Jim Thorpe.

== Location ==
Mount Pisgah is located above Jim Thorpe and is the northeastern end of the 12.5-mile-long Pisgah Mountain (or Pisgah Ridge) above the Lehigh Valley. The peak is located in northeastern Pennsylvania's Anthracite Upland region on the west bank of the Lehigh River just north of and parallel to Broadway, which is a block downhill from the lower looping end of the historic Lehigh Coal & Navigation Company's historic Mauch Chunk & Summit Hill Railway, which delivered coal to barges through chutes crossing what is now U.S. Route 209 and the rail yard along the Lehigh.

While the lower south slope of the mountain and the ends of the railroad loop and yard have now been developed into private lots and a town street, there are still two railway rights-of-ways—railroad bed road ends now turned into bike & hiking trails to travel the 7.6 miles (12.2 km) trip to the upper terminus and loop at Summit Hill, Pennsylvania. The former Upwards or climbing roadbed connects via a switchback path the steep climb to the Mount Pisgah summit that has a view of the surrounding countryside, especially the Lehigh Valley and the Mauch Chunk-Bear Mountain Gap and the slackwater area above the last canal dam 600 feet (183 m) below, and two hiking-biking trails now depart along the pathways up to Summit Hill, Pennsylvania once the uproads and downroads of the United States' and North America's second railroad, Mauch Chunk Switchback Railway is also located at the base of the mountain.

== Name ==
Mt. Pisgah is named for the biblical mountain in Jordan from which Moses first saw the promised land.
