= Nesquehoning, Pennsylvania =

Borough in Pennsylvania, US

- Borough
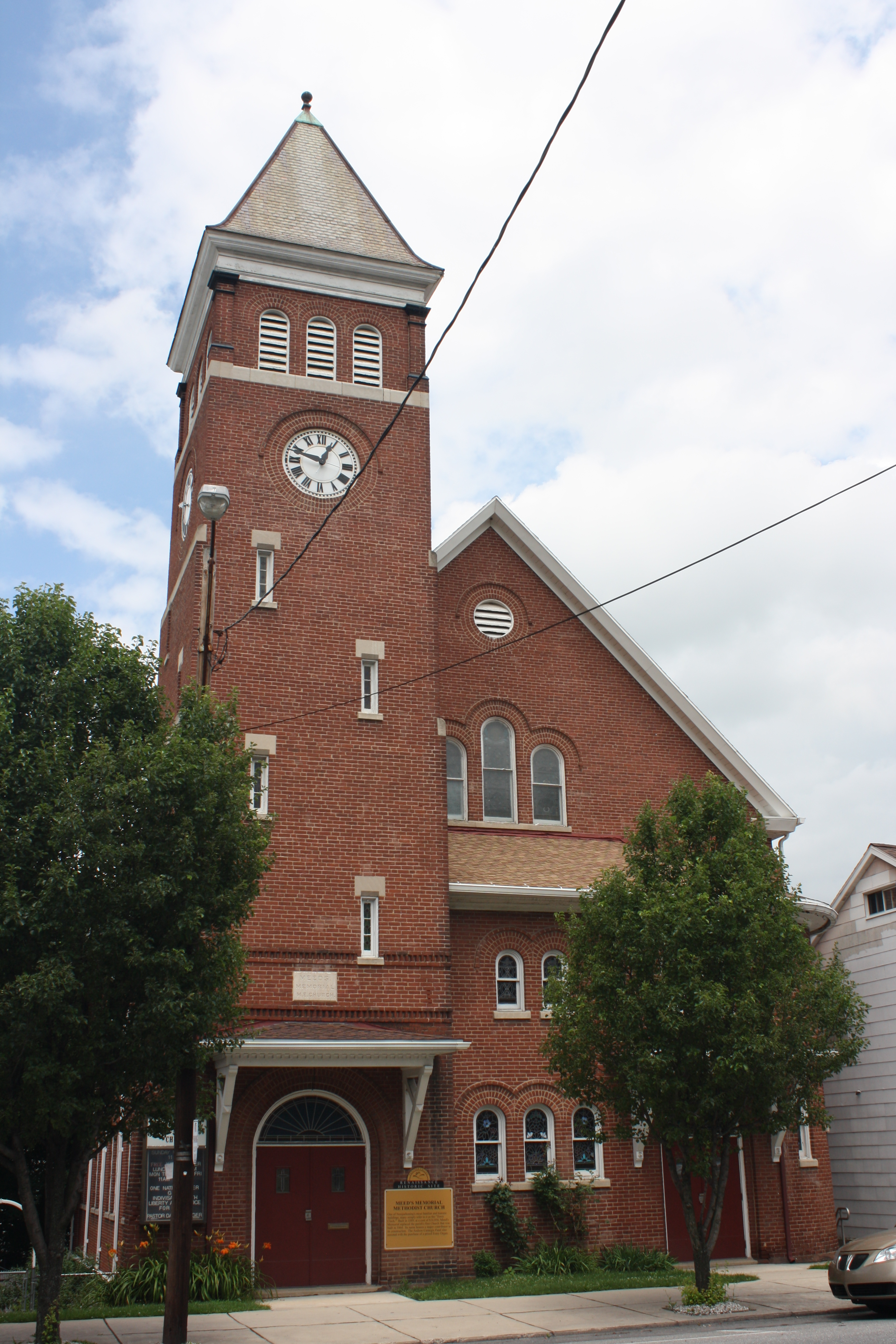
- Meeds Memorial United Methodist Church, July 2013

- Location in Carbon County, Pennsylvania

- Location in Pennsylvania Location in the United States
- Coordinates: 40°52′05″N 75°49′27″W
- Country: United States
- State: Pennsylvania
- County: Carbon

Area
  - Total: 21.55 sq mi (55.81 km^{2})
  - Land: 21.16 sq mi (54.81 km^{2})
  - Water: 0.39 sq mi (1.01 km^{2})
- Elevation: 830 ft (250 m)

Population (2020)
  - Total: 3,336
  - Density: 157.7/sq mi (60.87/km^{2})
- Time zone: UTC-5 (EST)
  - Summer (DST): UTC-4 (EDT)
- ZIP code: 18240
- Area codes: 570
- FIPS code: 42-53088
- Website: nesquehoning.org

Nesquehoning is a borough in Carbon County, Pennsylvania, United States. It is part of Northeastern Pennsylvania. The population was 3,336 at the 2020 census.

Nesquehoning was established as a result of the anthracite coal mining industry. It was incorporated as a borough in 1963 (effective in 1964), having previously been a part of Mauch Chunk Township west of the Lehigh River. The borough's name is of Native American origin, commonly believed to signify "narrow valley;" however native language scholars translate the name as "at the black lick" or "at the dirty lick," referring to mineral licks frequented by deer or other animals.

== History ==
- The former Nesquehoning High School was added to the National Register of Historic Places in 2003.
- The Grotto, Our Lady of Lourdes Shrine at the Shrine of St. Therese of Lisieux in New Columbus, Nesquehoning, PA is listed as a Traditional Cultural Property at the US National Register of Historic Places.

== Geography ==
Nesquehoning is located at 40°52′5″N 75°49′27″W (40.868178, -75.824176). According to the U.S. Census Bureau, the borough has a total area of 21.6 square miles (56 km^{2}), of which, 21.2 square miles (55 km^{2}) is land and 0.4 square miles (1.0 km^{2}) (1.90%) is water. Nesquehoning is 3 miles (4.8 km) west of Jim Thorpe and 4 miles (6.4 km) northeast of Lansford. Nesquehoning's elevation is 830 feet (250 m) above sea level. It has a warm-summer humid continental climate (Dfb) and its monthly average temperatures range from 26.5 °F (−3.1 °C) in January to 71.1 °F (21.7 °C) in July. The hardiness zone is 6a.

== Neighborhoods ==
Nesquehoning can be roughly divided into four neighborhoods:

Nesquehoning Village - This neighborhood is located in the southeastern section of the Borough with the Nesquehoning Creek serving as its northern border. More than half of the borough's residents live in this neighborhood.

New Columbus - This neighborhood includes the area north of the Nesquehoning Creek, opposite Nesquehoning Village. The second largest neighborhood in terms of the number of people next to the Nesquehoning neighborhood, development of the New Columbus neighborhood was a result of relocating the Little Italy section of Nesquehoning.

Old Hauto - This neighborhood is in the southwestern section of the borough, at the base of Nesquehoning Mountain to the south. It is bordered by the Nesquehoning Creek and the former Nesquehoning Valley Railroad (now owned by the County of Carbon) on the north. There are two hamlets or housing clusters in this neighborhood. One is the historical Old Hauto Village area, which is located in the west along PA Route 54. The other housing cluster is a subdivision development located in the easterly part of the neighborhood between PA Route 54 and Park Avenue. It was developed beginning in the late 1960s and is known locally as Hauto Valley Estates.

Lake Hauto - This neighborhood is a lakeside resort type community situated on the northern side of Lake Hauto. Lake Hauto is a private community. Although often thought of as being in Nesquehoning, the majority of the Lake Hauto community is actually located in neighboring Rush Township, Schuylkill County.

== Demographics ==
Historical population
Census	Pop.	Note	%±
1880	957		—
1890	1,655		72.9%
1970	3,338		—
1980	3,346		0.2%
1990	3,364		0.5%
2000	3,288		−2.3%
2010	3,349		1.9%
2020	3,336		−0.4%

=== 2020 census ===
As of the 2020 census, Nesquehoning had a population of 3,336. The median age was 45.7 years. 17.0% of residents were under the age of 18 and 22.3% of residents were 65 years of age or older. For every 100 females there were 98.9 males, and for every 100 females age 18 and over there were 98.3 males age 18 and over.

0.0% of residents lived in urban areas, while 100.0% lived in rural areas.

There were 1,358 households in Nesquehoning, of which 22.9% had children under the age of 18 living in them. Of all households, 42.3% were married-couple households, 21.4% were households with a male householder and no spouse or partner present, and 27.1% were households with a female householder and no spouse or partner present. About 32.2% of all households were made up of individuals and 16.0% had someone living alone who was 65 years of age or older.

There were 1,626 housing units, of which 16.5% were vacant. The homeowner vacancy rate was 4.0% and the rental vacancy rate was 11.0%.

Racial composition as of the 2020 census
Race	Number	Percent
White	3,038	91.1%
Black or African American	79	2.4%
American Indian and Alaska Native	6	0.2%
Asian	13	0.4%
Native Hawaiian and Other Pacific Islander	0	0.0%
Some other race	79	2.4%
Two or more races	121	3.6%
Hispanic or Latino (of any race)	162	4.9%

=== 2010 census ===
As of the census of 2010, there were 3,349 people, 1,440 households, and 864 families residing in the borough. The population density was 155.04 inhabitants per square mile (59.86/km^{2}). There were 1,701 housing units at an average density of 78.75 per square mile (30.41/km^{2}). The racial makeup of the borough was 96.7% White, 1.2% African American, 0.24% Native American, 0.06% Asian, 0.95% from other races, and 0.90% from two or more races.Hispanic or Latino of any race were 2.4% of the population.

There were 1,440 households, of which 25.0% had children under the age of 18 living with them, 48.9% were married couples living together, 10.5% had a female householder with no husband present, and 36.2% were non-families. 32.0% of all households were made up of individuals, and 17.6% had someone living alone who was 65 years of age or older. The average household size was 2.30 and the average family size was 2.89.

In the borough the population was spread over all age groups, with 18.8% under the age of 18, 8.3% from 18 to 24, 28.7% from 25 to 44, 23.0% from 45 to 64, and 21.3% who were 65 years of age or older. The median age was 41 years. For every 100 females, there were 98.9 males. For every 100 females age 18 and over, there were 96.3 males.

The median income for a household in the borough was $35,902, and the median income for a family was $41,855. Males had a median income of $30,417 versus $19,291 for females. The per capita income for the borough was $16,820. About 2.0% of families and 9.7% of the population were below the poverty line, including 3.0% of those under age 18 and 23.4% of those age 65 or over.

=== Demographic estimates ===
In Census Bureau profile estimates, the reported ancestry was 38.0% German, 20.8% Irish, 17.4% Italian, 5.2% English, 5.0% Dutch, 4.2% Polish, 4.1% Slovak, 2.6% Ukrainian, 2.2% Hungarian, and 1.5% Russian.

Census Bureau profile estimates reported a median household income of $45,450, a median family income of $68,000, a median income of $72,287 for married couples, and a median income of $25,089 for non-families. The poverty rate was 14.5% overall, including 20.6% of people under age 18, 10.8% of people ages 18 to 64, and 19.3% of people age 65 and over.

== Economy ==
Nesquehoning is the former home of KME Corp, which was the largest employer in the borough for many decades until operations ceased in early 2022. The company, a division of REV Group, manufactures custom-built fire fighting vehicles for a variety of markets worldwide, and other specialty heavy-duty vehicles, including aircraft refuelers. At its peak, the company employed approximately 1,000 people in Nesquehoning, providing many jobs for the area. REV Group announced in late 2021 that they will be closing the factory in town, leaving approximately 400 out of work.

ConEdison Development has built one of the state's largest solar energy plants in Nesquehoning. Green Energy Capital Partners, Conshohocken, Pennsylvania, developed the initial phase of the project before turning it over to ConEdison. The 10 megawatt photovoltaic solar energy plant was completed in 2012 and covers approximately 90 acres near the Green Acres Industrial Park. The power plant consists of approximately 40,000 solar panels, and produces enough energy to power about 1,500 homes. The solar energy plant was doubled in size several years later, with the second phase commencing operation in January 2020.

Reading Blue Mountain and Northern Railroad bought the part of the KME campus on the north side of Pennsylvania Route 54 in 2022 and is in the process of building a passenger rail station that is expected to open in the spring of 2024 as well as shop facilities for locomotives and rail cars.

== Education ==
The residents of Nesquehoning are served by the Panther Valley School District. Some residents of Nesquehoning are served by Our Lady of the Angels elementary school (grades K-8) and Marian Catholic High School (grades 9-12), located near Tamaqua, Pennsylvania.

== Transportation ==
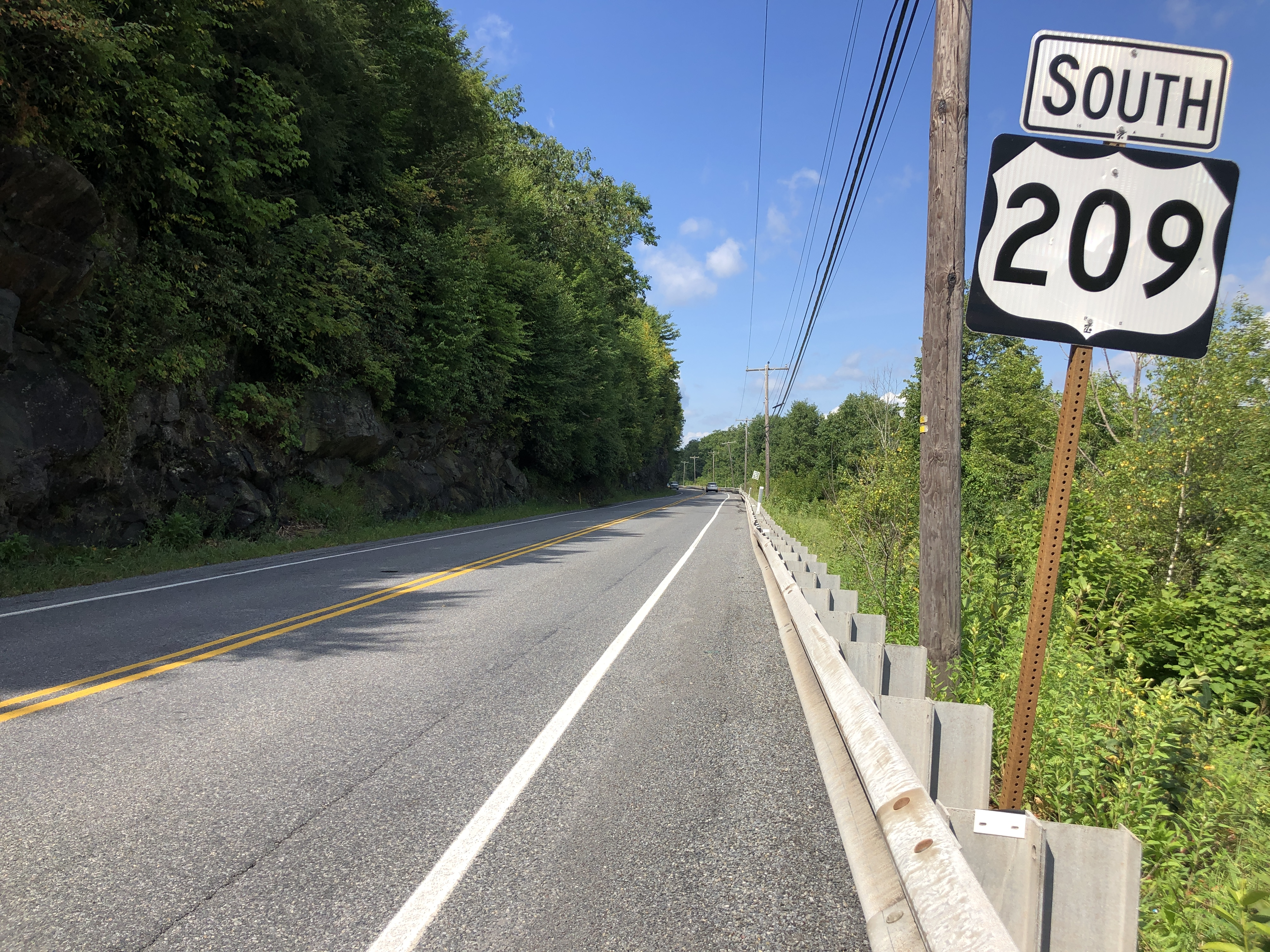
U.S. Route 209 southbound in Nesquehoning

As of 2020, there were 29.15 miles (46.91 km) of public roads in Nesquehoning, of which 14.50 miles (23.34 km) were maintained by the Pennsylvania Department of Transportation (PennDOT) and 14.65 miles (23.58 km) were maintained by the borough.

U.S. Route 209 is the most prominent highway serving Nesquehoning. It follows Market Street and Catawissa Street along a southwest-northeast alignment through the southern and eastern parts of the borough. Pennsylvania Route 54 begins at US 209 and follows Stock Street southwestward. Pennsylvania Route 93 also begins at US 209, following Hunter Street northwestward.

Reading Blue Mountain and Northern Railroad is building a passenger rail station that is slated to open August 19, 2024 to host the Iron Horse Ramble.

== Notable people ==
- Gene Snitsky (born 1970) – professional wrestler

== Climate ==
Humid continental climate is a climatic region typified by large seasonal temperature differences, with warm to hot (and often humid) summers and cold (sometimes severely cold) winters. The Köppen climate classification subtype for this climate is "Dfa" (Hot Summer Continental Climate).

Climate data for Nesquehoning, Pennsylvania
Month	Jan	Feb	Mar	Apr	May	Jun	Jul	Aug	Sep	Oct	Nov	Dec	Year
Mean daily maximum °C (°F)	4 (39)	4 (39)	9 (49)	16 (60)	24 (75)	29 (85)	33 (92)	31 (88)	26 (79)	18 (65)	11 (51)	4 (40)	18 (64)
Mean daily minimum °C (°F)	−7 (19)	−8 (17)	−4 (25)	1 (34)	7 (45)	12 (54)	14 (58)	14 (57)	9 (49)	3 (38)	−1 (31)	−6 (21)	3 (37)
Average precipitation mm (inches)	94 (3.7)	76 (3)	100 (4)	100 (4.1)	120 (4.8)	120 (4.6)	120 (4.7)	110 (4.5)	110 (4.5)	97 (3.8)	110 (4.5)	97 (3.8)	1,270 (49.9)
Source: Weatherbase
