= Canal age =

Era of canal-building

The Canal Age is a term of art used by science, technology, and industry historians. Various parts of the world have had various canal ages; the main ones belong to Egypt, Ancient Babylon, and the historical empires of India, China, Southeast Asia, and mercantile Europe. The successes of the Canal du Midi in France (1681), Bridgewater Canal in Britain (fully completed 1769), and Eiderkanal (superseded by today's Kiel Canal) in Denmark (later Germany) (1784) spurred on what was called in Britain "canal mania". In the Thirteen Colonies in 1762 legislation was passed supporting in the colonial-era Province of Pennsylvania to improve navigation on the Schuylkill River through Philadelphia.

Canals were critical industry, as until steam locomotives, canals were by the fastest way to travel long distances. Commercial canals generally had boatmen shifts that kept the barges moving behind mule teams 24 hours a day. (Note: Travel from Philadelphia to Pittsburgh in the 1820s would take 3-4 weeks by wagon road, 2-3 weeks walking diligently, and 10-14 days on horseback. When the Pennsylvania Canal System began operating, a heavy cargo of iron products could travel from Philadelphia to Pittsburgh in just four days, crossing over the Allegheny heights via the inclined planes and cable railroad technology of the Allegheny Portage Railroad.)

== North American canal age ==
Technology archaeologists and industrial historians date the American Canal Age from 1790 to 1855 based on momentum and new construction activity, since many of the older canals, although limited by locks that restricted boat sizes below the most economic capacities (Note: In 1823), nonetheless continued in service well into the twentieth century. (Note: One other feature of canals, dams, locks and navigations was their resistance to upgrading without great expense.)

=== Background ===
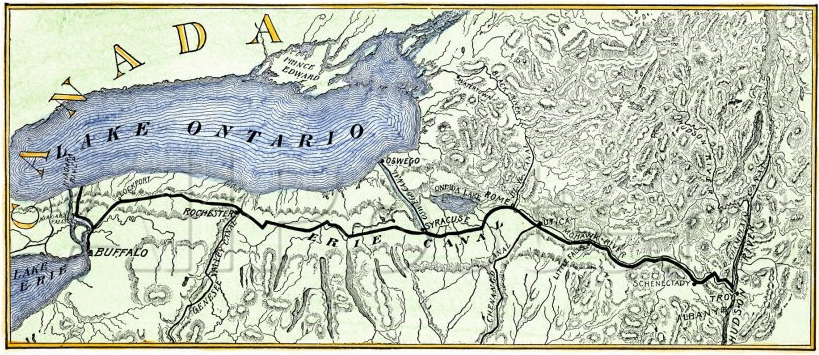
A c. 1840 map of the Erie Canal

From the first days of the expansion of the British colonies from the coast of North America into the heartland of the continent, a recurring problem was that of transportation between the coastal ports and the interior. This was not unique to the Americas, and the problem still exists in those parts of the world where muscle power provides a primary means of transportation within a region. An equally ancient solution was implemented in many cultures — things in the water weighed far less and took less effort to move since friction became negligible. Close to the seacoast, rivers often provided adequate waterways, but the Appalachian Mountains, 400 miles (640 km) inland, running over 1,500 miles (2,400 km) long as a barrier range with just five passes where mule trains or wagon roads could be routed, presented a great challenge. Passengers and freight had to travel overland, a journey made more difficult by the rough condition of the roads. In 1800, it typically took 2.5 weeks to travel overland from New York to Cleveland, Ohio [460 miles (740 km)] and 4 weeks to Detroit [612 miles (985 km)].

The principal exportable product of the Ohio Valley was grain, which was a high-volume, low-priced commodity, bolstered by supplies from the coast. Frequently it was not worth the cost of transporting it to far-away population centers. This was a factor leading to farmers in the west turning their grains into whiskey for easier transport and higher sales, and later the Whiskey Rebellion. In the 18th and early 19th centuries, it became clear to coastal residents that the city or state that succeeded in developing a cheap, reliable route to the West would enjoy economic success, and the port at the seaward end of such a route would see business increase greatly. In time, projects were devised in Virginia, Maryland, Pennsylvania, and relatively deep into the coastal states.

=== Early history ===
Mohawk Valley, running east and west, cuts a natural pathway between the Catskill Mountains to the south and the Adirondack Mountains to the north

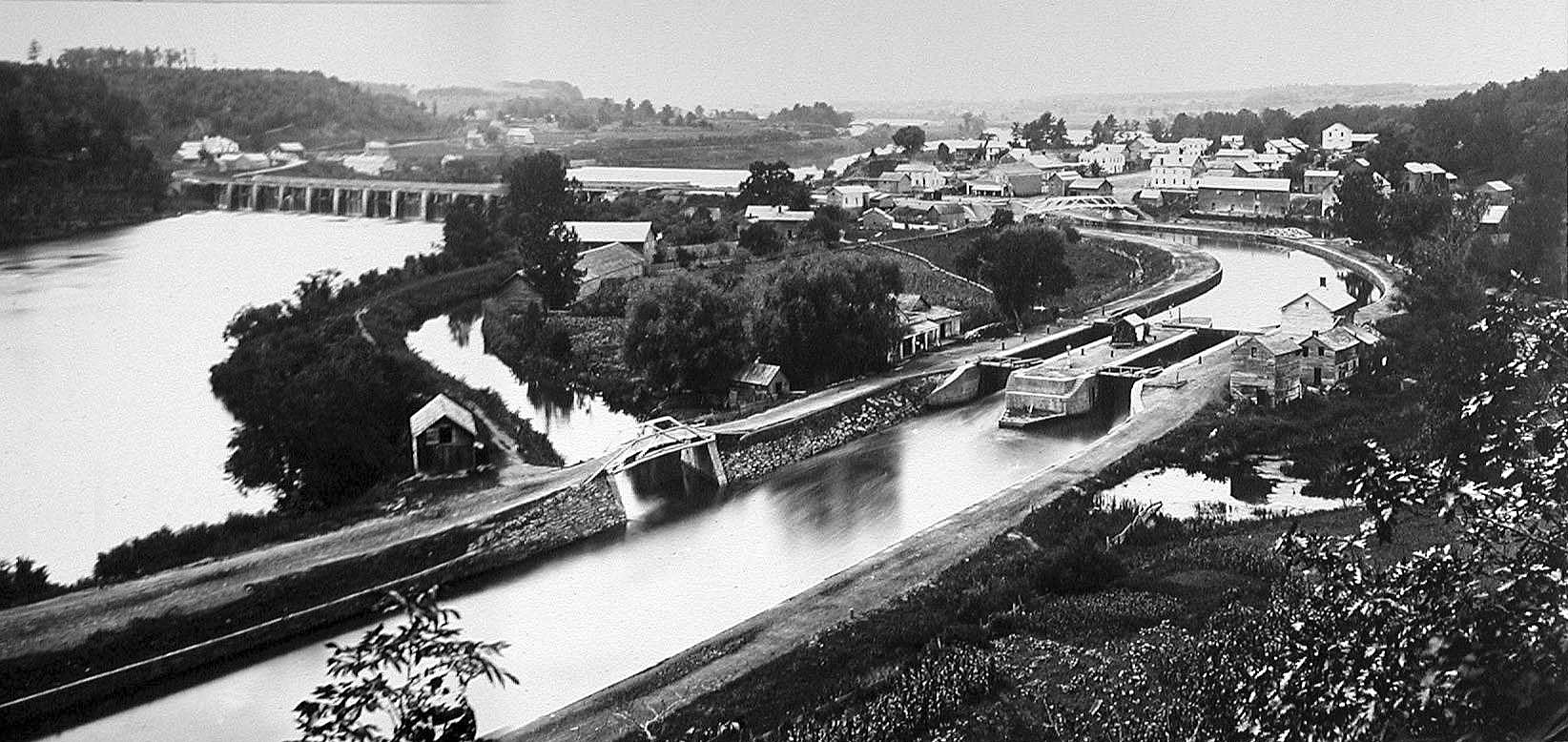
The aqueduct over the Mohawk River in Rexford, New York, one of 32 navigable aqueducts on the Erie Canal

The idea of a canal to tie the East Coast of the United States to the new western settlements was already in the air by 1724: New York provincial official Cadwallader Colden made a passing reference (in a report on fur trading) to improving the natural waterways of western New York.

Gouverneur Morris and Elkanah Watson were early proponents of a canal along the Mohawk River. Their efforts led to the creation of the Western and Northern Inland Lock Navigation Companies in 1792 (which took the first steps to improve navigation on the Mohawk and construct a canal between the Mohawk and Lake Ontario), but the company proved that private financing was insufficient.

George Washington led a partly enduring effort to turn the Potomac River into a navigable link to the west, sinking substantial energy and capital into the Patowmack Canal from 1785 until his death fourteen years later.

By 1788 Washington's Potomac Company was successful in constructing five locks which took boats 4,500 feet (1,400 m) past the Potomac Great Falls. The Chesapeake and Ohio Canal superseded the Potomac Canal in 1823.

Christopher Colles (who was familiar with the Bridgewater Canal) surveyed the Mohawk Valley, and made a presentation to the New York state legislature in 1784 proposing a canal from Lake Ontario. The proposal drew attention and some action but was never implemented.

Jesse Hawley finally got the canal built. He had envisioned encouraging the growing of large quantities of grain on the Western New York plains (then largely unsettled) for sale on the Eastern seaboard. However, he went bankrupt trying to ship grain to the coast. While in Canandaigua debtors' prison, Hawley began pressing for the construction of a canal along the 90-mile-long (140 km) Mohawk River valley with support from Joseph Ellicott (agent for the Holland Land Company in Batavia). Ellicott realized that a canal would add value to the land he was selling in the western part of the state. He later became the first canal commissioner.

The first legislation supporting canals in North America was passed in 1762 in the colonial-era Province of Pennsylvania to improve navigation on the Schuylkill River through Philadelphia, the largest city in North America. It provided for the surveying of a lock canal along the Schuylkill tributary Tulpehocken Creek; this would be built between 1782 and 1828 as the Union Canal, part of the omnibus Pennsylvania legislative package, the Main Line of Public Works, and was the only water route connecting the Susquehanna and Delaware Rivers above the Chesapeake Bay.

Pennsylvania had been foremost among the colonies in canal building, for it had surveyed as early as 1762 the first lock canal in America, from near Reading on the Schuylkill to Middletown on the Susquehanna.

As energetic men all along the Atlantic Plain now took up the problem of improving the inland rivers, they faced a storm of criticism and ridicule that would have daunted any but such as Washington and Johnson of Virginia or White and Hazard of Pennsylvania or Morris and Watson of New York. Every imaginable objection to such projects was advanced—from the inefficiency of the science of engineering to the probable destruction of all the fish in the streams. In spite of these discouragements, however, various men set themselves to form in rapid succession the Potomac Company in 1785, the Society for Promoting the Improvement of Inland Navigation in 1791, the Western Inland Lock Navigation Company in 1792, and the Lehigh Coal Mine Company in 1793. A brief review of these various enterprises will give a clear if not a complete view of the first era of inland water commerce in America.

— Archer B. Hurlbert (1920), Chapter III:, The Paths of Inland Commerce

Next up there were numerous schemes and bills placed before the Pennsylvania assembly in the 1790-1816 time frame to improve navigation on the Susquehanna, Schuylkill and Lehigh Rivers, the first being the Schuylkill and Susquehanna Navigation Company in 1791. They consumed private capital and public monies, but were little successful. Concurrently, the predecessor of the Erie Canal was begun in New York State and in New England, Connecticut and Massachusetts were looking at a few waterways needing better navigability. The Lehigh Canal was developed when the last of these licenses, awarded in 1816, expired in early 1818 with virtually nothing to show for the funds spent. This expiration allowed the state to give rights-of-way to the Lehigh Navigation and Coal Company in March 1818, founded by two disgruntled formerly enthusiastic backers of the Schuylkill Canal which was chartered in 1812 but like the earlier Lehigh River projects, languished lazily, only raising a small amount of new funds annually, and getting only a little amount of work done accordingly. (Note: It was common in the day for shares to be offered by the issuer by the payment of a down payment and an annual subscription to run for some period of yearly or quarterly payments of additional investment amounts.) Josiah White and partner Erskine Hazard needing fuel for their wire mill and nail factory at the falls of the Schuylkill fought this plodding method of incremental improvement for years.

Like many North American canals of the 1820s-1840s, the canal operating companies partnered with or founded short feeder railroads to connect to their sources or markets. Two good examples of this were funded by private enterprise:

1. The Lehigh Coal & Navigation Company used vertically integrated mining raw materials, transporting them, manufacturing with them, and merchandising by building coal mines, the instrumental Lehigh Canal, and feeding their own iron goods manufacturing industries and assuaging the American Republic's first energy crisis by increasing coal production from 1820 onwards using the nation's second constructed railway, the Summit Hill and Mauch Chunk Railroad.
2. The second coal road and canal system was inspired by LC&N's success. The Delaware and Hudson Canal and Delaware and Hudson Gravity Railroad. The LC&N operation was aimed at supplying the country's premier city, Philadelphia with much needed fuel. The D&H companies were founded purposefully to supply the explosively growing city of New York's energy needs.

Together, they and the Schuylkill Canal-Reading Railroad would supply and transport the majority of Anthracite needed by northern industries in the early North American Industrial Revolution. Unlike Europe, America did not have canals for several hundred years before industrialization. In North America, everything was developed simultaneously.

Early railroads in North America made many canals economically feasible, and canal's needs added to the demands by industries that pushed the early railroads into pressurized research and development and rapid steady improvements.

By 1855, canals were no longer the civil engineering work of first resort, for it was nearly always better—cheaper to build a railroad above ground than it was to dig a watertight ditch 6–8 feet (2–3 m) deep and provide it with water and make annual repairs for ice and freshet damages—even though the cost per ton mile on a canal was often cheaper in an operational sense, canals couldn't be built along hills and dales, nor backed into odd corners, as could a railroad siding.

On the settled eastern seaboard, forest decimation created an energy crisis for coastal cities, but the lack of water- and roadways made English coal shipped across the Atlantic cheaper in Philadelphia than Pennsylvania anthracite mined 100 miles away. Canals would benefit both the East and the Midwest. For more than a century, they had provided Europe with inexpensive, reliable transportation, and George Washington, Benjamin Franklin, and other founding fathers believed they were the key to the New World's future.

— James E. Held, Archeology (journal, July 1, 1998)

=== Engineering requirements ===
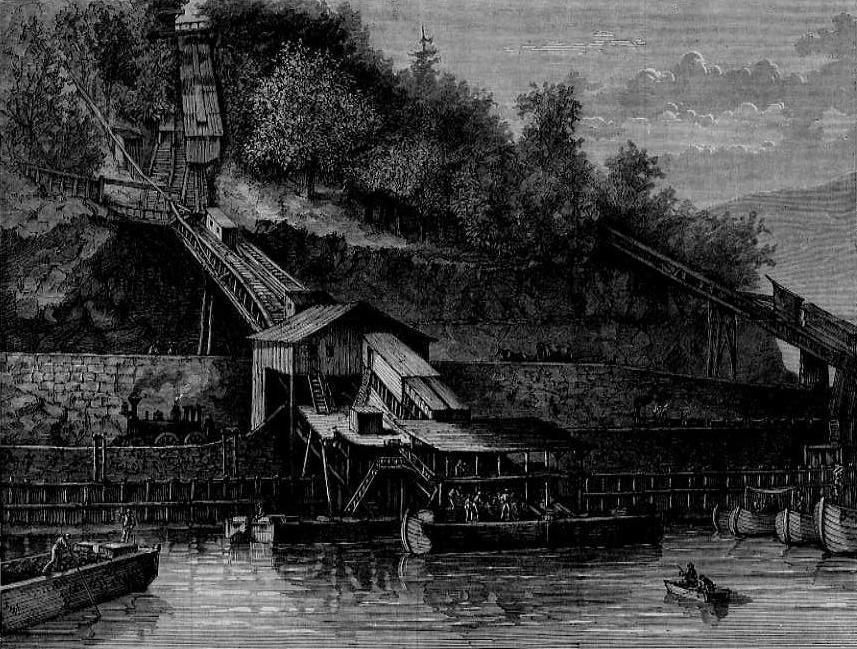
Loading coal at the Mauch Chunk chutes in 1873

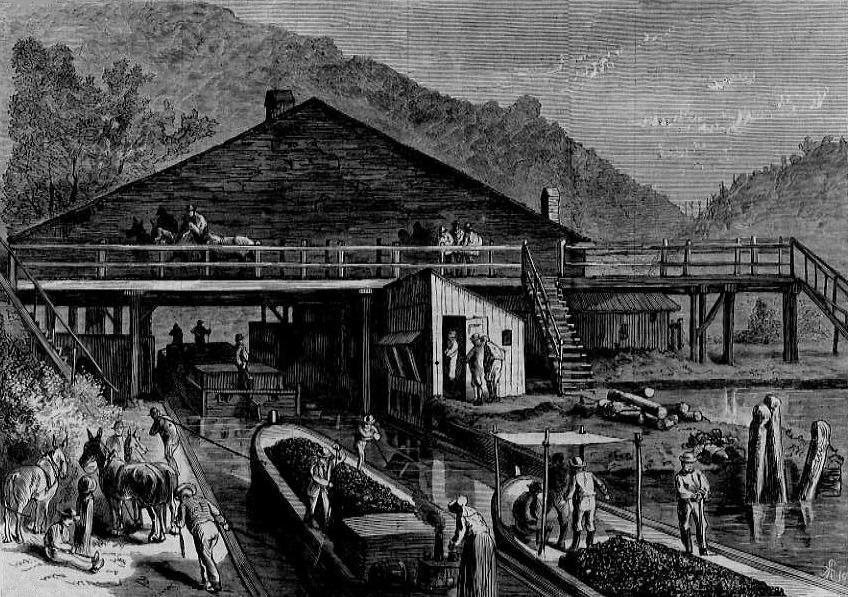
Weigh lock with scales to determine tolls in 1873

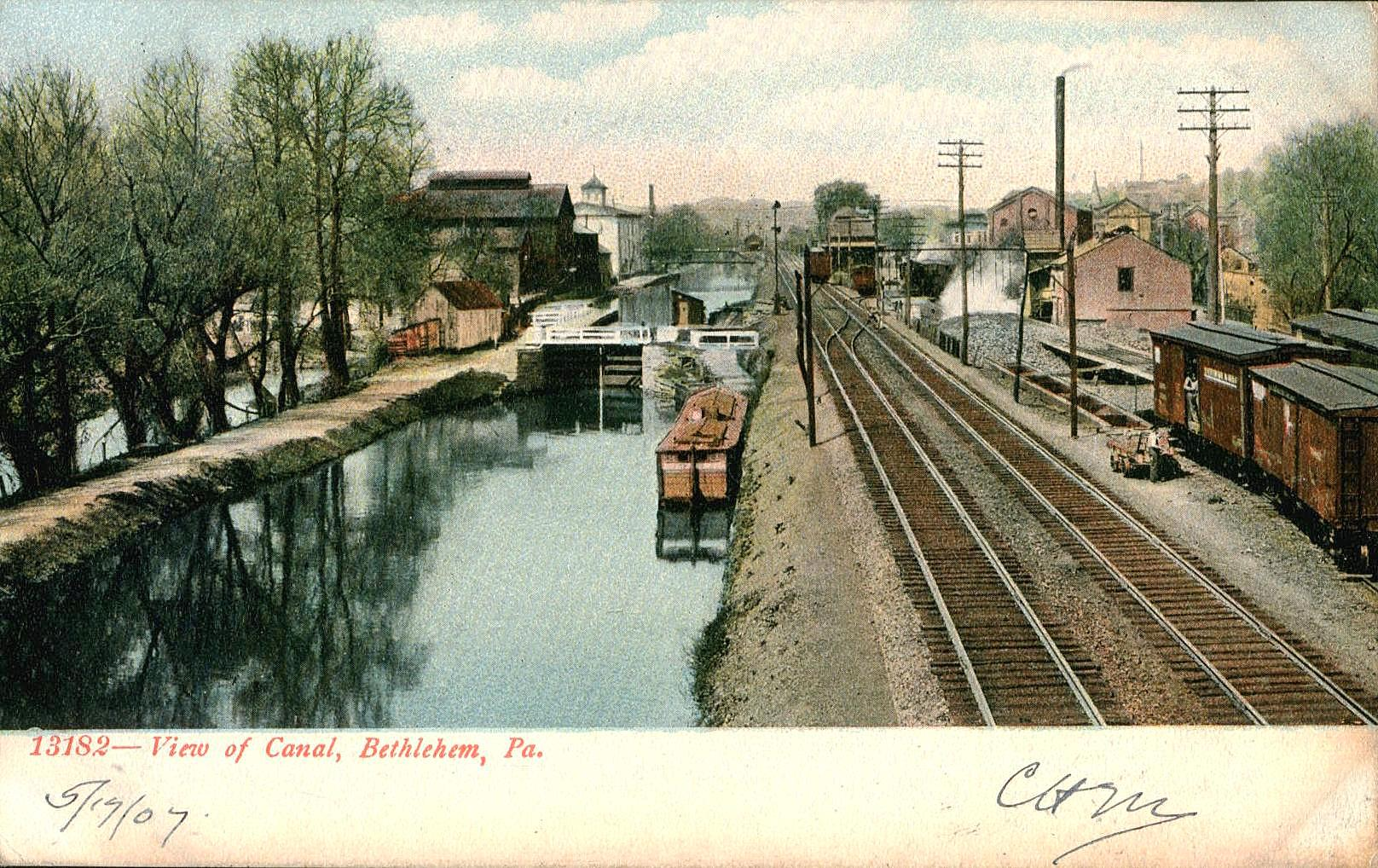
The canal passing through Bethlehem in 1907

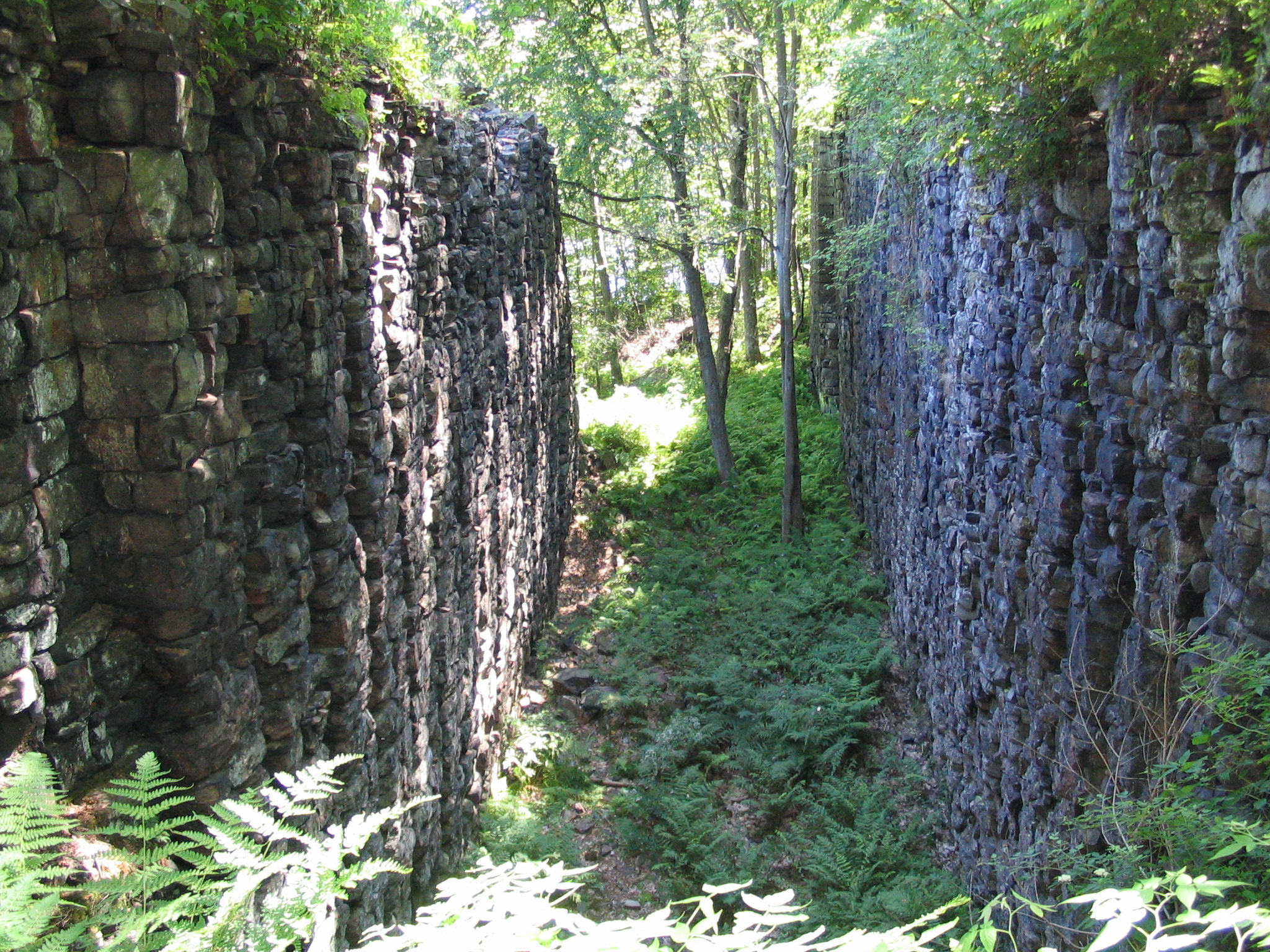
Remains of Lock 25 in 2006

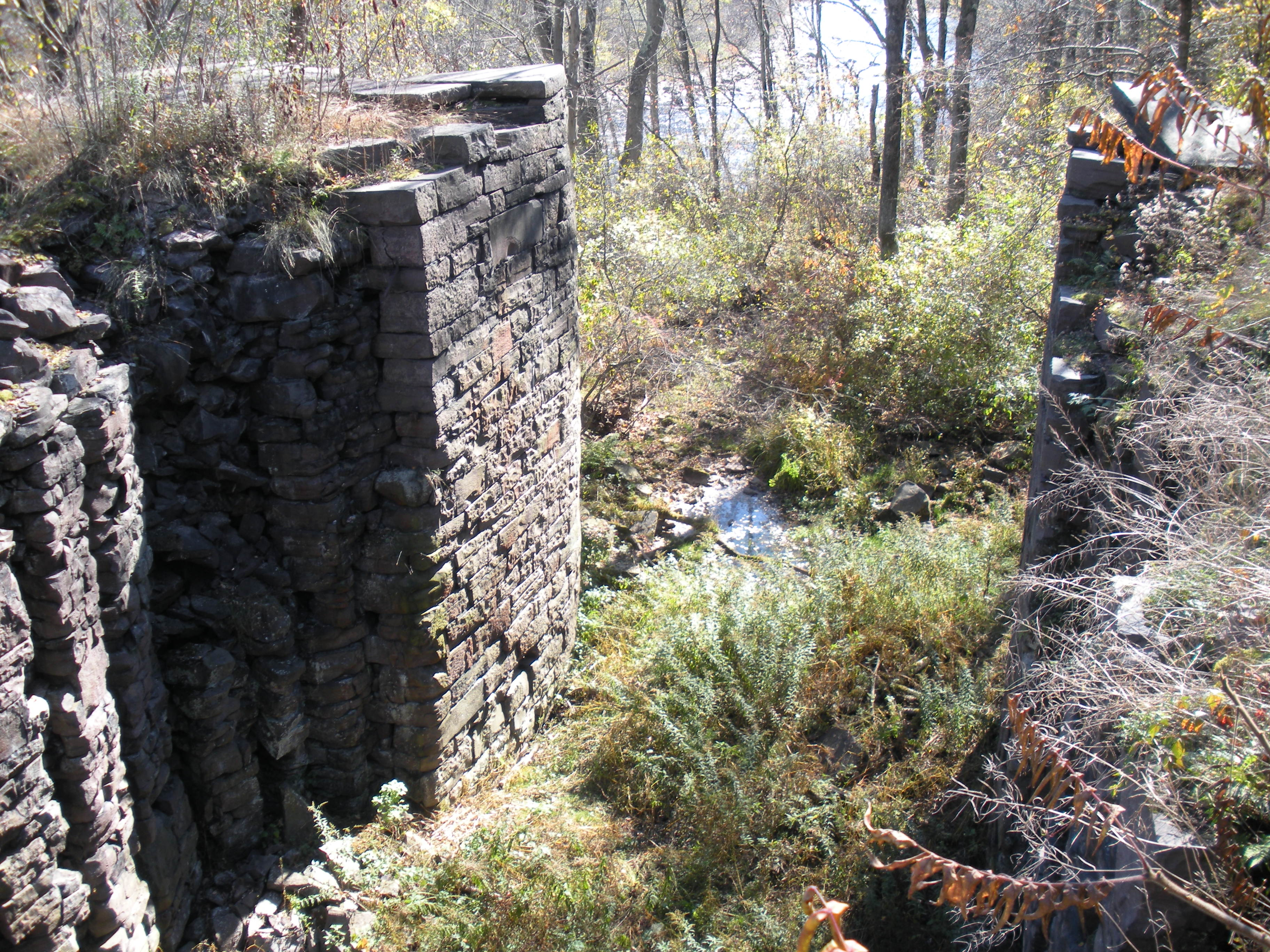
Image of the gate entrance of Lock 28

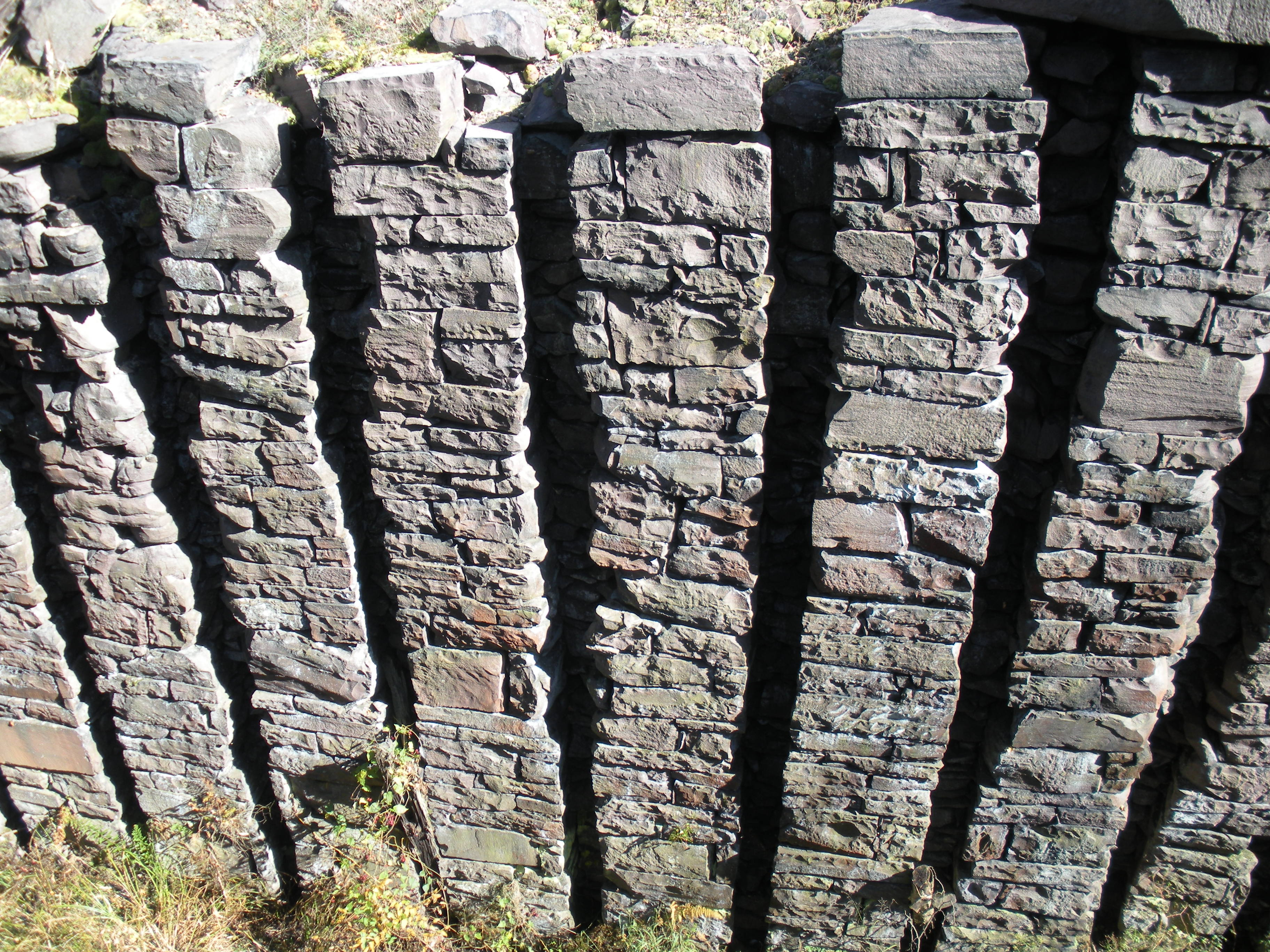
Stacked rock detail of Lock 28's lock wall near White Haven in 2008

The Mohawk River, a tributary of the Hudson River, rises near Lake Ontario and runs in a glacial meltwater channel just north of the Catskill range of the Appalachian Mountains, separating them from the geologically distinct Adirondacks to the north. The Mohawk and Hudson valleys form the only cut across the Appalachians north of Alabama, allowing an almost complete water route from New York City in the south to Lake Ontario and Lake Erie in the west. Along its course and from these lakes, other Great Lakes, and to a lesser degree, related rivers, a large part of the continent's interior and many settlements were well connected to the Eastern seaboard.

The problem was that the land rises about 600 feet (180 m) from the Hudson to Lake Erie. Locks at the time could handle up to 12 feet (3.7 m), so even with the heftiest cuttings and viaducts, fifty locks would be required along the 360-mile (580 km) canal. Such a canal would be expensive to build even with modern technology; in 1800, the expense was barely imaginable. President Thomas Jefferson called it "a little short of madness" and rejected it; however, Hawley interested New York Governor DeWitt Clinton in the project. There was much opposition, and the project was ridiculed as "Clinton's folly" and "Clinton's ditch." In 1817, though, Clinton received approval from the legislature for $7 million for construction.

The original canal was 363 miles (584 km) long, from Albany on the Hudson to Buffalo on Lake Erie. The channel was cut 40 feet (12 m) wide and 4 feet (1.2 m) deep, with removed soil piled on the downhill side to form a walkway known as a towpath.

Its construction, through limestone and mountains, proved a daunting task. The canal was built using some of the most advanced engineering technology from Holland. In 1823 construction reached the Niagara Escarpment, necessitating the building of five locks along a 3-mile (4.8 km) corridor to carry the canal over the escarpment. To move earth, animals pulled a "slip scraper" (similar to a bulldozer). The sides of the canal were lined with stone set in clay, and the bottom was also lined with clay. The stonework required hundreds of German masons, who later built many of New York's buildings. All labor on the canal depended upon human (and animal) power or the force of water. Engineering techniques developed during its construction included the building of aqueducts to redirect water; one aqueduct was 950 feet (290 m) long to span 800 feet (240 m) of river. As the canal progressed, the crews and engineers working on the project developed expertise and became a skilled labor force.

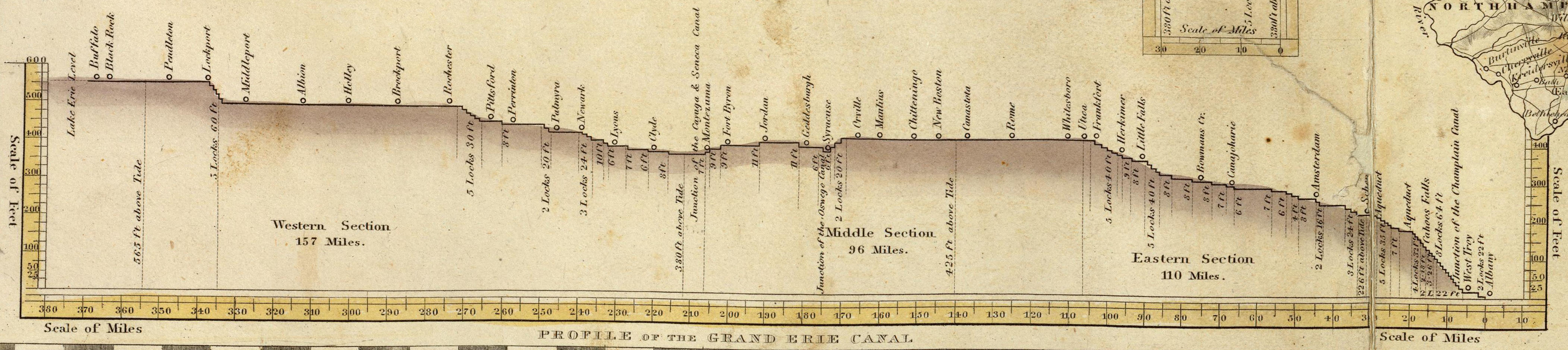
Profile of the original Erie Canal

=== Operation ===
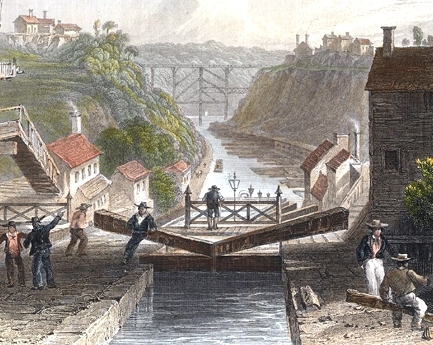
Canal operations in Lockport, New York in 1839

Canal boats up to 3 1/2 feet (1.1 m) in draft were pulled by horses and mules on the towpath. This canal has one towpath generally on the north side. When canal boats met, the boat with the right of way remained on the towpath side of the canal. The other boat steered toward the berm (or heelpath) side of the canal. The driver (or "hoggee", pronounced HO-gee) of the privileged boat kept his towpath team by the canalside edge of the towpath, while the hoggee of the other boat moved to the outside of the towpath and stopped his team. His towline would be unravelled from the horses, go slack, fall into the water and sink to the bottom while his boat decelerated on with its remaining momentum. The privileged boat's team would step over the other boat's towline with their horses pulling the boat over the sunken towline without stopping. Once clear, the other boat's team would continue on its way.

Pulled by teams of horses canal boats still moved slowly but methodically shrinking time and distance. Efficiently, the nonstop smooth method of transportation cut nearly in half the travel time between Albany and Buffalo moving day and night. Venturing West men and women boarded packets to visit relatives or solely for a relaxing excursion. Emigrants took passage on freight boats camping on deck or on top of crates. Packet boats serving passengers exclusively reached speeds of up to five miles per hour (8.0 km/h) an hour and ran at much more frequent intervals than cramped, bumpy stages.

Packet boats measuring up to 78 feet (24 m) in length and 14 1/2 feet (4.4 m) across made ingenious use of space in order to accommodate up to forty passengers at night and up to three times as many in the daytime. The best examples furnished with carpeted floors, stuffed chairs, and mahogany tables stocked with current newspapers and books served as sitting rooms during the days. At mealtimes crews transformed the cabin into dining rooms. Drawing a curtain across the width of the room divided the cabin into ladies' and gentlemen's sleeping quarters in the evening hours. Pull down tiered beds folded from the walls and additional cots could be hung from hooks in the ceiling. Some captains hired musicians and held dances. The canal had brought civilization into the wilderness.

=== The Lehigh and Erie Canals ===
Two early 19th century canals had inordinately large impacts on the demographic and industrial development of the United States. The daring Erie Canal, begun in 1815 after a decade of debate and contemplation was a bid to join the port of New York City to the promise of the Great Lakes, just then undergoing rapid settlement as the 1779 Sullivan Expedition had brushed aside the Iroquois and opened the Northwest Territory to settlement.

==== The Lehigh Canal ====
Inspired in part by the news of the Erie's technological achievements, the privately funded Lehigh Canal was an achievement brought about by the energy needs of two visionary industrialists, the politically connected Erskine Hazard and his older partner Josiah White, who together built the Lehigh Canal and the Lehigh Coal & Navigation Company, founding towns, mines, and building economically productive mining and transportation infrastructure from a wilderness in Eastern Pennsylvania south and west of the Poconos in the anthracite creating folded ridges of the Ridge and Valley Appalachians. Not a true canal, the Lehigh navigation was the type of canal built along the line of a river valley within its drainage basin and parallel to the fall of the watercourse. The Lehigh Canal for a time was two separate civil engineering projects constructed 20 years apart that stretched over two parts of the Lehigh River and totaling 72-mile (116 km) along the Lehigh River in eastern Pennsylvania.

The Lower Canal

The lower canal (46.5 miles (74.8 km)) was built by the Lehigh Coal & Navigation Company as a coal road to service the anthracite demand of the Eastern coast cities ahead of schedule, between 1818-1820 with down traffic only, and then gradually rebuilt with locks fully supporting two way traffic, between 1822-1824, 1827-1829 by the Lehigh Coal & Navigation Company and continued in operation as a key transportation canal until the 1931 closure of commercial operations. The lower canal connected the Southern Coal Region to the Delaware River basin, connecting present-day Jim Thorpe, Pennsylvania to Easton in the Lehigh Valley, using a specially designed canal boat capable of making the one-way trip on the River as well. (Note: The delay in completing the Delaware Canal is listed as an extra expense in the annual reports of LC&N.) It was used to carry anthracite gathered to the central Lehigh Valley to the urban markets of the northeast, especially Philadelphia, Trenton, New Jersey, and Wilmington, Delaware, but supported new growth industries in Bristol, Pennsylvania, Allentown and Bethlehem. The privately funded canal was joined as part of the Pennsylvania Canal System, a complex system of canals and tow paths—and eventually railroads. The canal was sold for recreation use in the 1960s.

The Lehigh Navigation & Coal Company sits astride the history of the 1820-1880s Industrial Revolution, with much the same fame as a modern conglomerates such as General Motors or General Electric, or with the same sorts of innovations as are ascribed to IBM or Microsoft.

=== Lower Lehigh Canal ===
With the discovery of large surface deposits of anthracite coal, the Lehigh Coal Mine Company (LCMC) was formed in 1792 to secure the mineral rights to vast areas of wilderness west of the Lehigh River ranging beyond to the outcrops atop Sharpe Peak of Pisgah Ridge near present-day Summit Hill, Pennsylvania. The LCMC lacked a principle investor as a hands-on-manager and periodically hired teams to trek to the wilderness to build 'Arks' along the Lehigh near the turnpike operated from Lausanne (Note: Lausanne is mentioned repeatedly in various 19th century and early 20th century Histories of Carbon County and Luzerne County as a toll station on the foot and horseback turnpike between Mauch Chunk and the Susquehanna River. Other histories mention the turnpike running past Beaver Meadows' developing mines, and mention one of the houses there as being built in association with the toll road and that the initial mine output was hauled out by mule train along the turnpike to the more open country south of the Lehigh Gap. The Turnpike is also mentioned as passing through Penn Haven Junction and running alongside Black Creek and Beaver Creek to get to the mines. This leads to the speculative conclusion that the Lausanne homestead, also mentioned as near the mouth of Nesquehoning Creek was a crossing of that creek whereupon the Turnpike ran along the shore to Penn Haven, up to Beaver Meadows and beyond to what became Hazleton.) above Mauch Chunk to the Susquehanna River valley passed by Beaver Meadows and the eventual Beaver Meadows mines, and then attempted to transport the coal down the Lehigh River to the Delaware River and on to the docks in Philadelphia.

The lack of steady effort and an intimately involved company officer in the operations returned sketchy results, most often the expeditions would loose arks on the rapids of the Lehigh and so the LCMC made little profits, and only sporadic efforts over two decades. Inspired by the energy shortfall during the blockade of the War of 1812, the LCMC sent a large expedition out in 1813, which started down the river in spring of 1814 with five arks laden with coal. Only two of them made it to Philadelphia, and both were purchased by Josiah White and partner Erskine Hazard. The LCMC board in its disgust confirmed the unreliability of the fuel source when they let it be known they planned no further risky expeditions as too costly, giving White and Hazard the idea of purchasing the rights to operate the mining company. In the fall of 1814 they mounted an expedition to survey the Lehigh's problems and those of the coal mine and transportation needs for getting its output to the River reliably and regularly.

==== Initial construction ====
The lower Lehigh Canal improvements were initially designed and engineered by LC&N founder Josiah White (Note: Josiah White, a foundry and wire mill owner needing much in the way of metal working fuels, so had also been behind the systematic investigations which determined several successful ways to burn and use Anthracite industrially and for heating in 1813. He'd set his foreman and supervisors the task of experimenting with Anthracite he'd obtained from samples from up the Schuylkill River valley near present-day Pottstown, Pennsylvania and the main coal port on the eventual Schuylkill Canal, which he backed as an interested investor along with Erskine Hazard ca. 1814.) after they'd very quickly become disenchanted with the decisions and strategies of the Schuykill Canal's board of directors, so by the winter of 1814 were very interested in exploring the option of getting coal from Lehigh valley down to Philadelphia the more than 100 miles (160 km), one way or another., but by late 1822 just as anthracite was achieving early acceptance and the skepticism was waning (Note: The Philadelphia brothers spearheading the Wyoming Valley's coal road were inspired by both the early Erie Canal operations (first uses in 1821) and the LC&N's success so by 1823 were seeking investors for the Delaware and Hudson Canal, which included as an integral part, the Delaware and Hudson Gravity Railroad. The D&H project was devised to ship Anthracite to fuel starved New York City, already seeing an uptick in commerce from the parts of the Erie Canal then opened to operations.) the drain of building sacrificial 'Coal Arks' for every load delivered to the docks of Philadelphia in 1822 as the LC&N operations were just hitting stride was already a worry to the managing board of directors. By mid-1822, managing director Josiah White was consulting with Canvass White, a veteran designing engineer of New York's Erie Canal locks, and by late 1822 had shifted construction efforts from bolstering and improving the one-way system begun in 1818 with ambitious two-way dams and lock construction capable of taking both a steam tug and a coastal cargo ship all 45.6 miles (73.4 km) from the Delaware to the slack water pool at Mauch Chunk in present-day Jim Thorpe.

== See also ==
- Canals of the United Kingdom
- Canal Mania
- Changzhou Ancient Canal
- Delaware and Lehigh National Heritage Corridor
- List of canals in France
- List of Roman canals
