= Chain Bridge =

Chain bridges are suspension bridges built with chains. Some chain bridges built using this design have retained the name Chain Bridge. Thus as a proper noun, it may refer to:

In Hungary:

- Chain Bridge (Budapest), a bridge over the Danube in Budapest, Hungary (completed 1849)

In Germany:

- Chain Bridge (Nuremberg), a pedestrian bridge over the river Pegnitz in Nuremberg, Bavaria (opened 1924)

In the United Kingdom:

- Union Bridge (Tweed), a bridge over the River Tweed between England and Scotland (opened 1820)
- Chain Bridge, a bridge over the River Usk in Monmouthshire, Wales (opened 1829)
- Chain Bridge (Berwyn), a bridge over the River Dee at Berwyn, Llangollen, Denbighshire, North Wales (completed 1818)

In the United States:

- Chain Bridge (Easton, Pennsylvania), a historic change bridge spanning the Lehigh River (completed 1857)
- Chain Bridge (Potomac River) a bridge at the Little Falls of the Potomac River in Washington, D.C. (completed 1808)
- Chain Bridge (Massachusetts), a bridge which crosses the Merrimack River, connecting Amesbury and Newburyport, Massachusetts (completed 1810)
