= Erie Canal Museum =

Canal museum in Syracuse, New York

- Established: October 25, 1962
- Website: http://eriecanalmuseum.org/
- Weighlock Building
- U.S. National Register of Historic Places
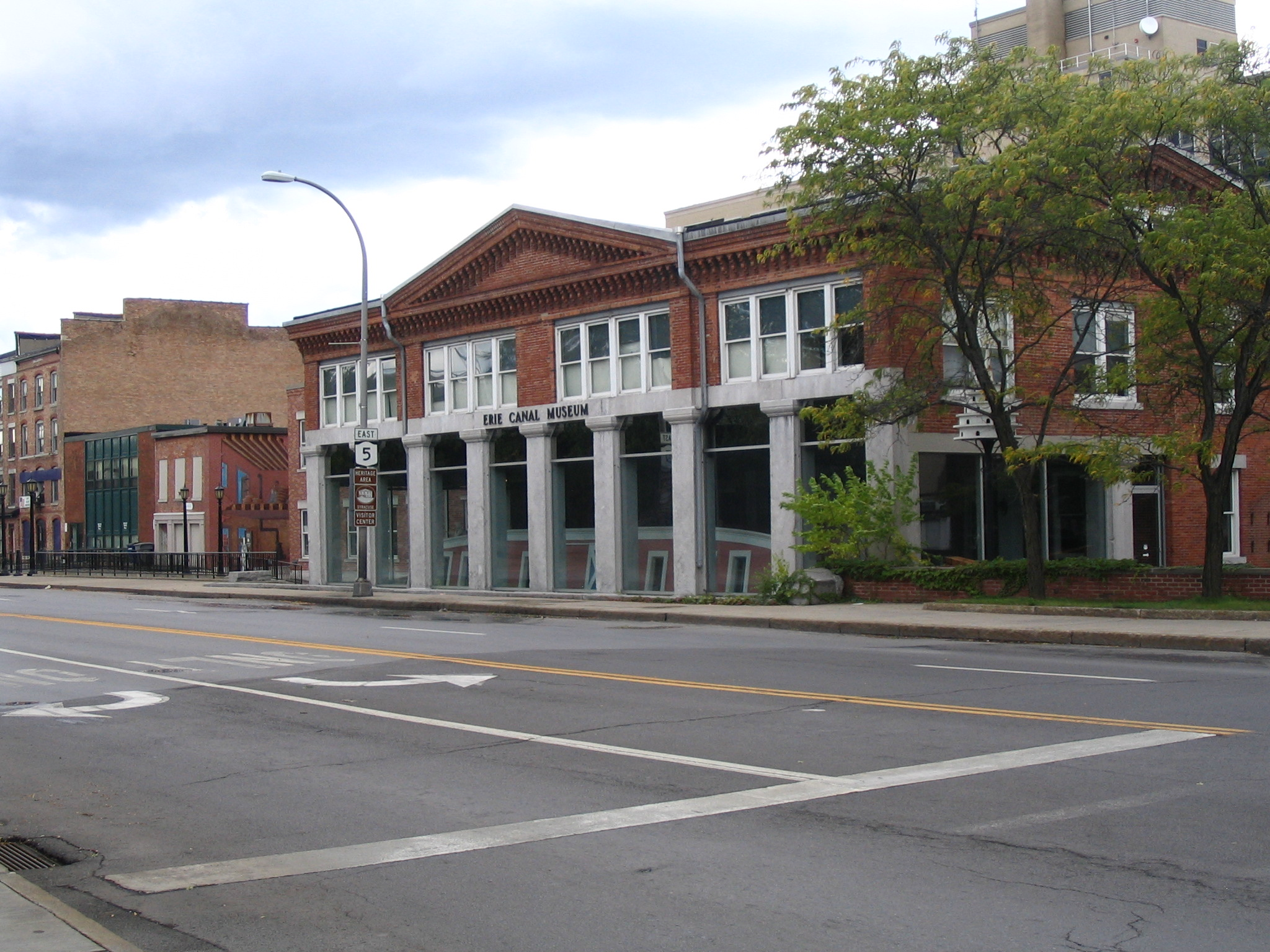
- Erie Canal Museum in former weigh lock building, Syracuse, New York

- Location within New York Location within the United States
- Location: SE corner of Erie Blvd. E. and Montgomery St., Syracuse, New York
- Coordinates: 43°3′2.4″N 76°8′55.8″W
- Built: 1849
- NRHP reference No.: 71000552
- Added to NRHP: February 18, 1971

The Erie Canal Museum is a historical museum about the Erie Canal located in Syracuse, New York. The museum was founded in 1962 and is a private, non-profit corporation. It is housed in the Syracuse Weighlock Building dating from 1850. The Syracuse Weighlock Building was in operation as a weighlock from 1850 to 1883. In 1883 the canal decided to stop charging tolls. The building served as a scale to weigh boats traveling on the Erie Canal and determine toll payment. The mission of the museum to document the past and current history of the Erie Canal.

The museum's Weighlock Building was listed on the National Register of Historic Places in 1971.

== History of the Weighlock Building ==
The Weighlock Building was constructed in 1850. After 1883, when tolls were no longer collected, the building served other purposes. In 1940, it was taken over by the State Department of Public Works. It was turned into a museum in 1962 through the efforts of a local citizens group.

== Collections ==
The Syracuse Weighlock Building itself is the largest and perhaps most significant artifact in the museum's collection. The Erie Canal Museum was founded to save the Weighlock Building from demolition. Today it is the only surviving weighlock from the Erie Canal.

When the weighlock was in operation boats could pass from the canal right into the lock chamber. The lock would let the water out and the full weight of the boat would be recorded on the scales. The weight determined the toll.

To get an accurate weight for each load, the weight of the boat itself, as listed on the Empty Weight Certificate of the boat, would be subtracted from its weight as measured in the weighlock.

The museum houses the Frank Buchanan Thomson, a full size replica line boat, on display in what was previously the lock chamber of the Weighlock.

Since its opening in 1962, the museum collection has slowly grown and now includes over 50,000 items related to the operation of the Erie Canal, lateral canals, and other man made waterways

According to the museum's website, the collections include, “approximately: 1,400 objects (costumes, furnishings, tools, commemorative and documentary items, canal boat equipment, models, and household items); 1,500 prints; 950 sketches and drawings; 45 paintings; 39,000 photographs and negatives; 100 glass plate negatives; 200 rare books; and, miscellaneous maps, plans, receipts, and other manuscript and archival material.”

== Today ==
The museum today is visted by tour groups traveling through Syracuse, NY. It also holds lectures and events throughout the year, including the annual Gingerbread Gallery each winter, and the After Hours events on Wednesday nights during the summer.

The Erie Canal Museum is partially funded by the New York State Council on the Arts. Admission to the Museum is by donation.

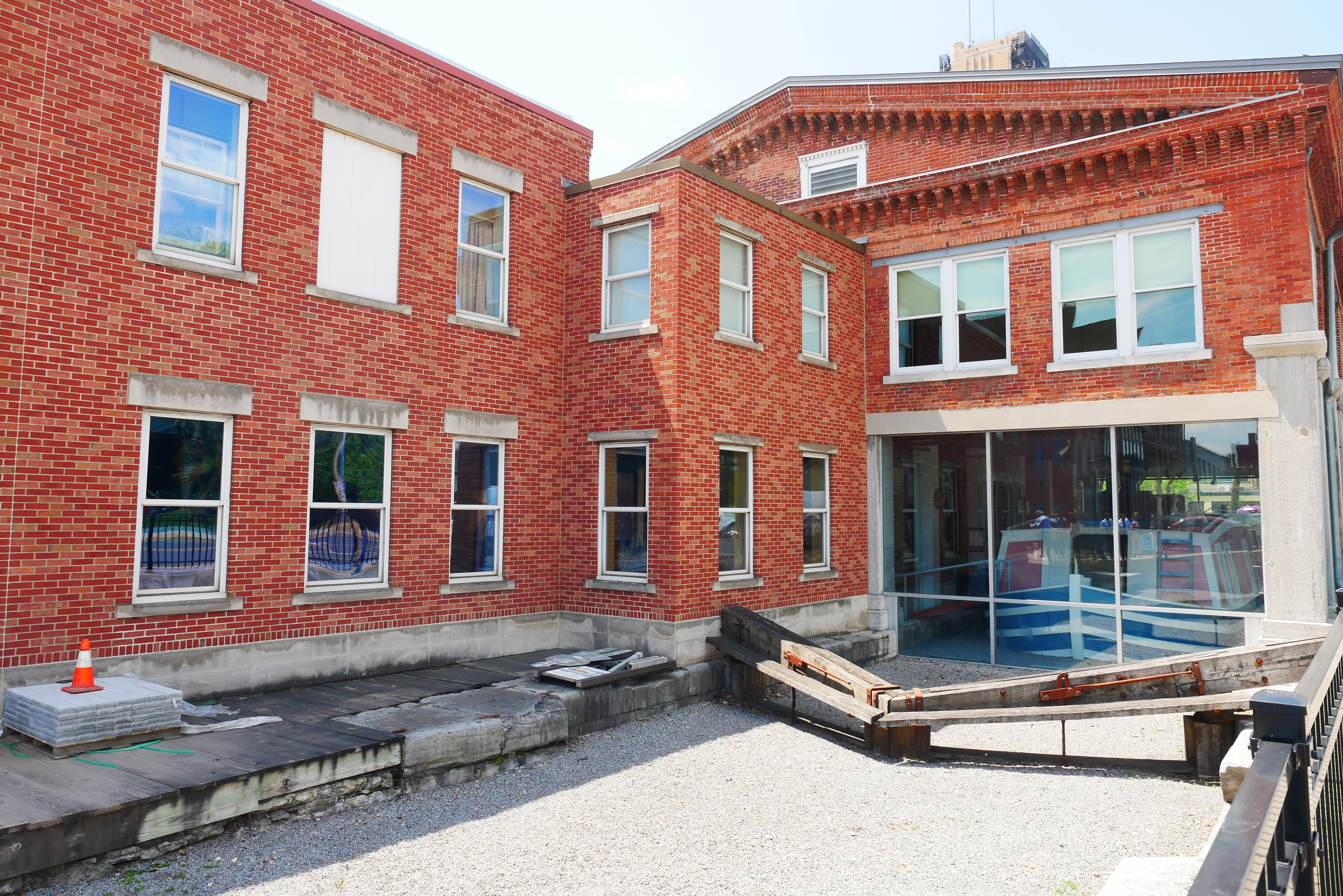
Erie Canal Museum exterior

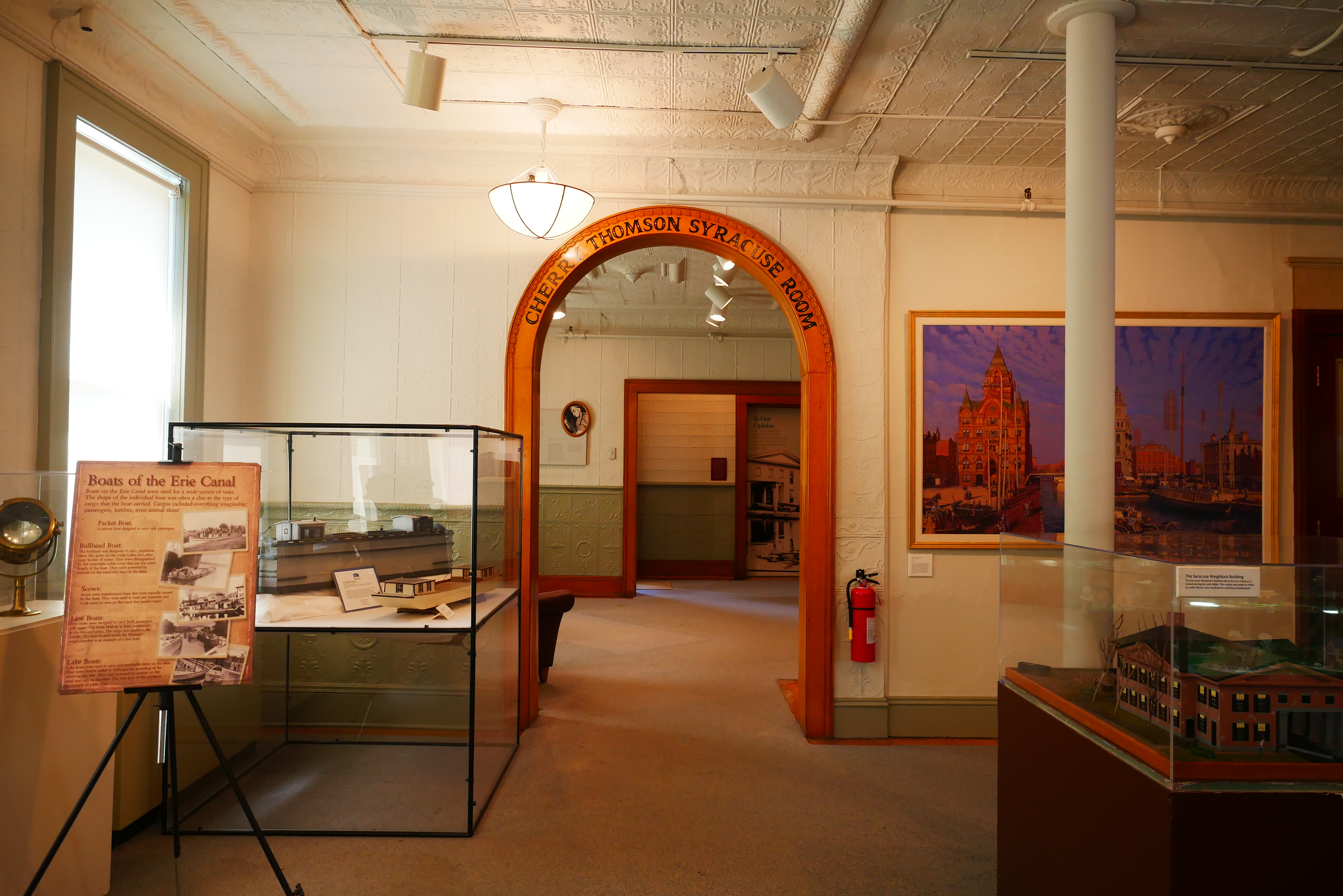
Interior of the Erie Canal Museum

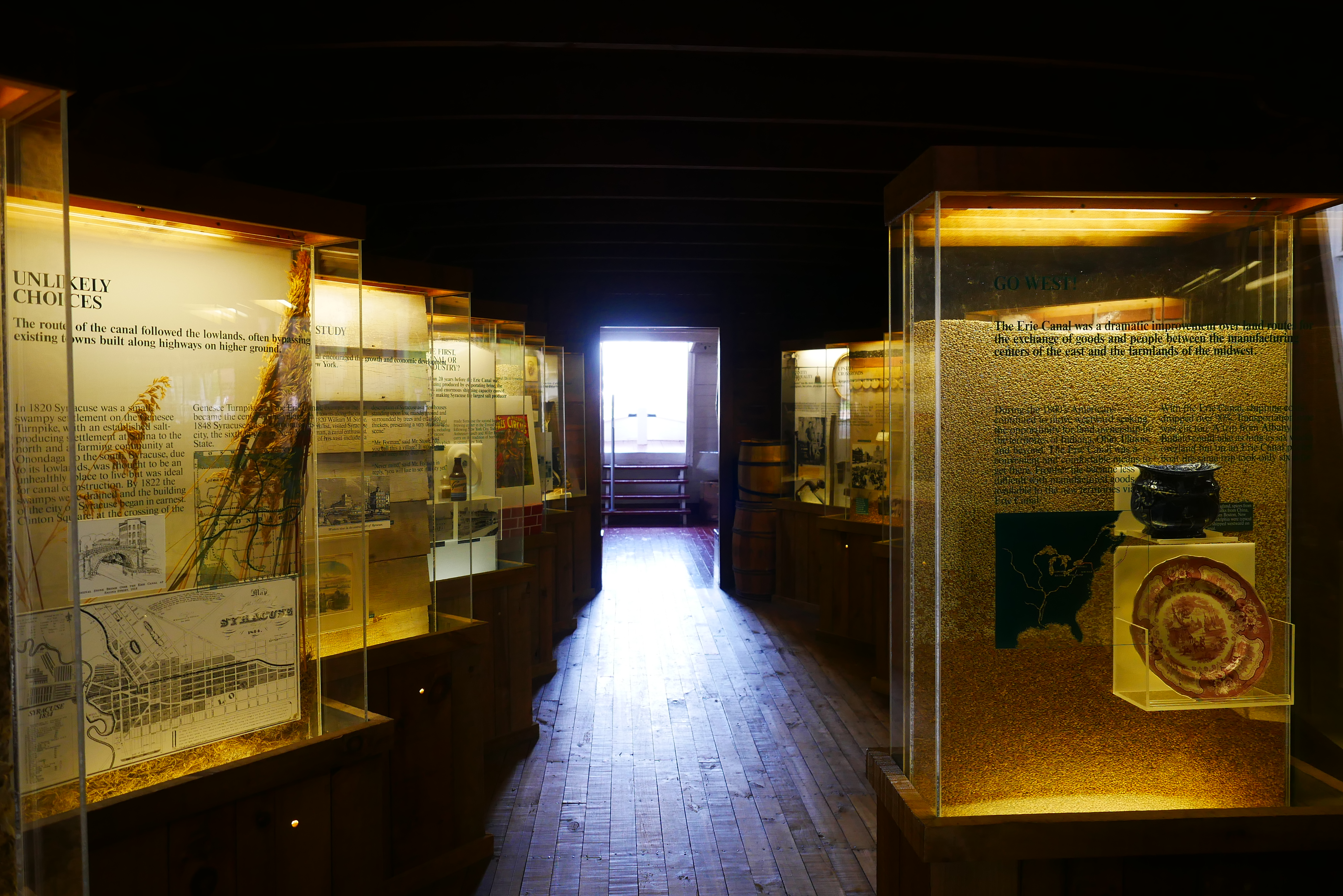
Erie Canal Museum barge display

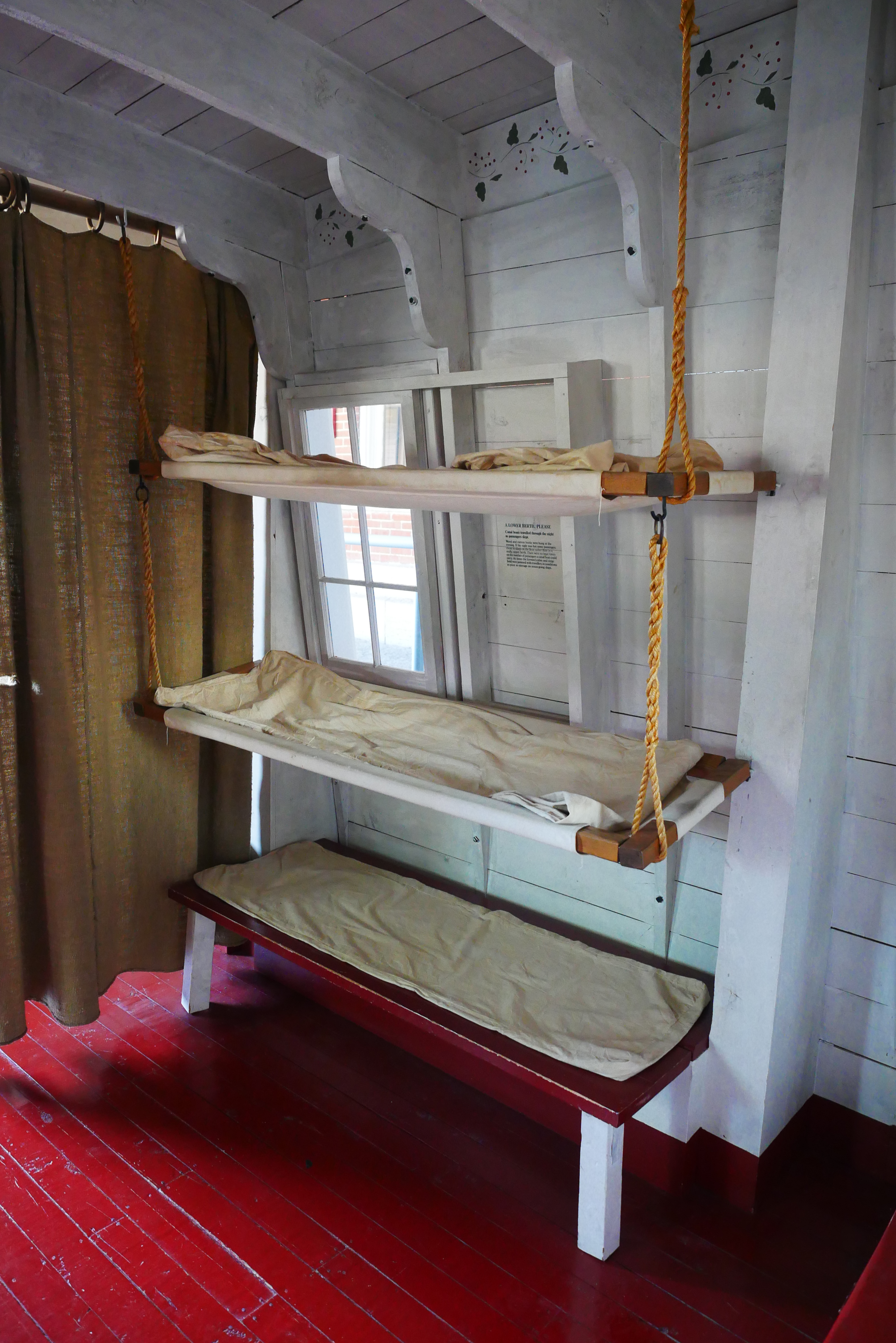
Erie Canal Museum boat bunk

== See also ==
- Erie Canalway National Heritage Corridor
- New York State Canalway Trail
- Old Erie Canal State Historic Park
- List of maritime museums in the United States
