= Lehigh Canal =

- U.S. National Register of Historic Places
- U.S. Historic district
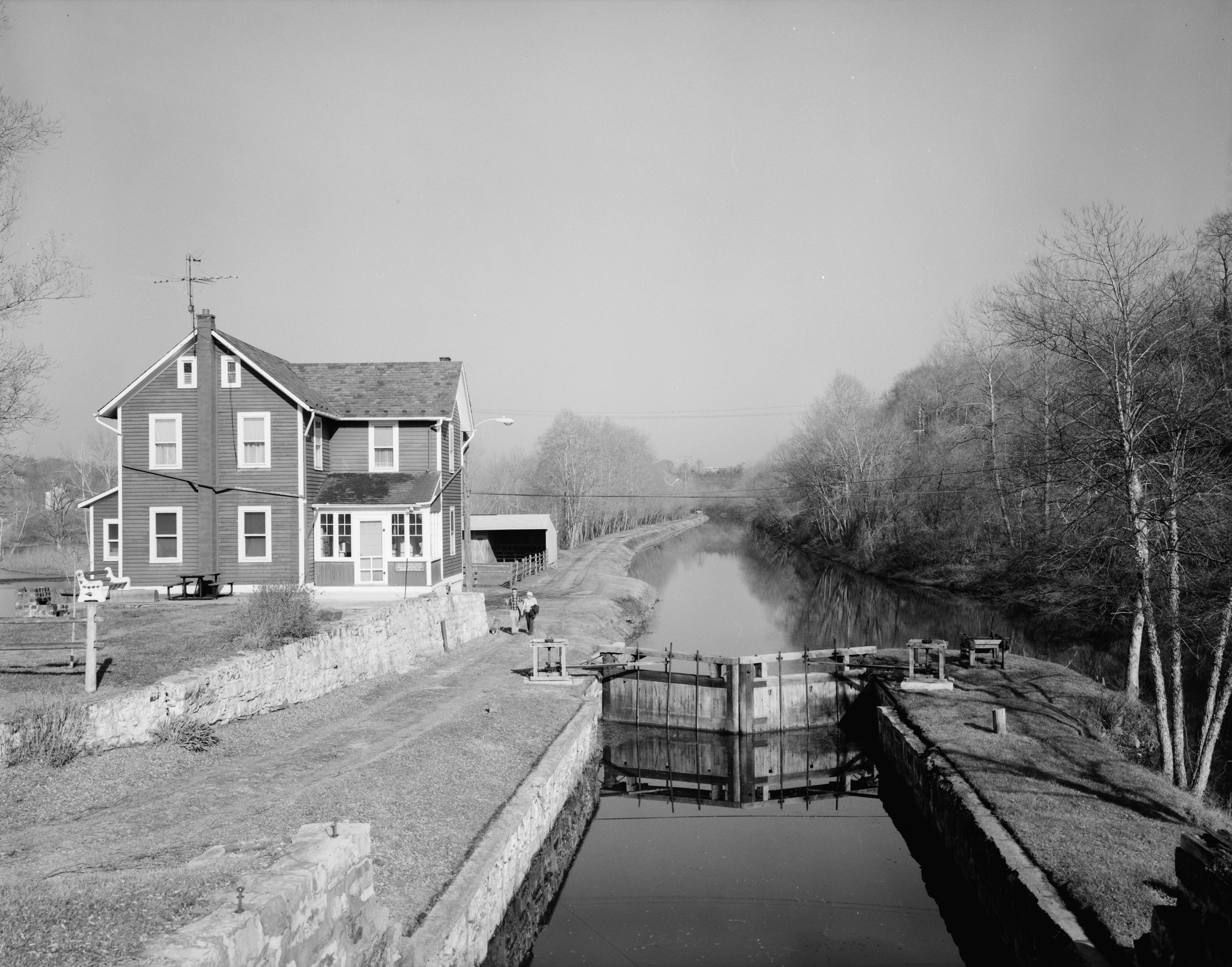
- The Lehigh Canal in Glendon, Pennsylvania in 1979
- Location: Lehigh River in Pennsylvania. Upper: Nesquehoning to White Haven Lower: Jim Thorpe to the Delaware River in Easton
- Coordinates: 40°46′09″N 75°36′13″W
- Built: 1818–1821; 1824–1827 upper: 1838–1843, Upper ruined and abandoned: 1862
- Architects: Canvass White, Josiah White
- Architectural style: Fitted stone, iron, and wood
- NRHP reference No.: 78002437, 78002439, 79002179, 79002307, 80003553
- Added to NRHP: Earliest October 2, 1978

The Lehigh Canal is a navigable canal that begins at the mouth of Nesquehoning Creek on the Lehigh River in the Lehigh Valley and Northeastern regions of Pennsylvania. It was built in two sections over a span of 20 years beginning in 1818. The lower section spanned the distance between Easton and present-day Jim Thorpe. In Easton, the canal met the Pennsylvania Canal's Delaware Division and Morris Canals, which allowed anthracite coal and other goods to be transported further up the U.S. East Coast. At its greatest extent, the Lehigh Canal was 72 miles (116 km) long.

Although the canal was used to transport a variety of products, its most significant cargo was anthracite coal, the highest quality energy source then available in the United States, and pig iron, a vital input product used in manufacturing steel. Both proved cornerstones of the Lehigh Valley's ascent as a central hub of the American Industrial Revolution, and their mining and transportation defined the rugged blue collar character of the Lehigh Valley towns that surrounded the canal.

The route initially consisted of canals and dammed-off sections of the Lehigh River. Boatmen had to navigate barges periodically from the canal through a lock onto the river or vice versa. This design saved time and money and made the canal functional while it was being built, although it made for a slower, more difficult trip for canal-boat captains.

== History ==
=== Early history ===
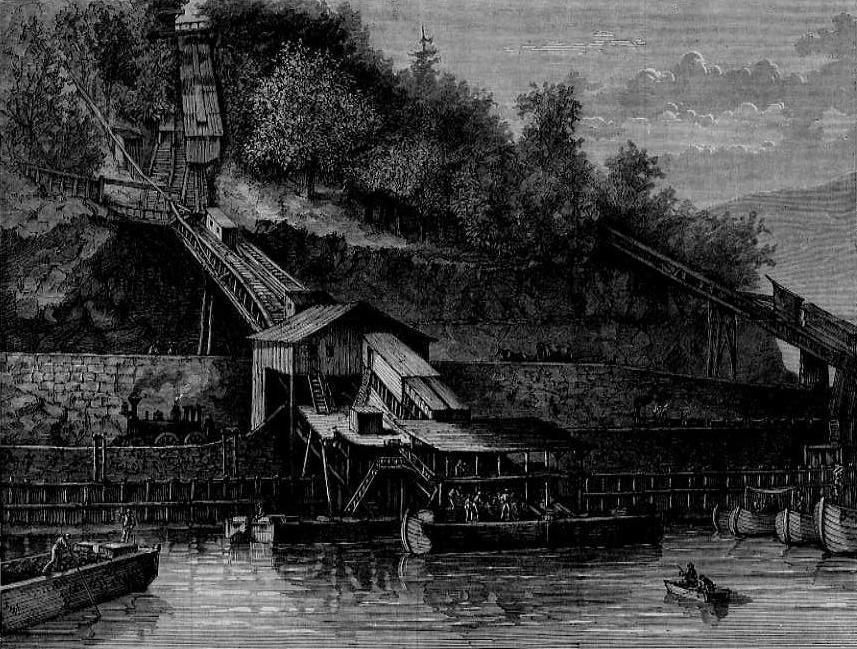
The February 1873 edition of Harper's Weekly featuring an illustration of anthracite coal loading at the loading chutes in Mauch Chunk, Pennsylvania; Hauto Tunnel was in operation, and the LC&N Co. allowed its subsidiary Summit Hill & Mauch Chunk Railroad to be sold as a tourist railroad. As the Mauch Chunk Switchback Railway, (Note: Operated by the Mauch Chunk Switchback Railway Company, as seen in a legal notice.) it was the world's first roller coaster.

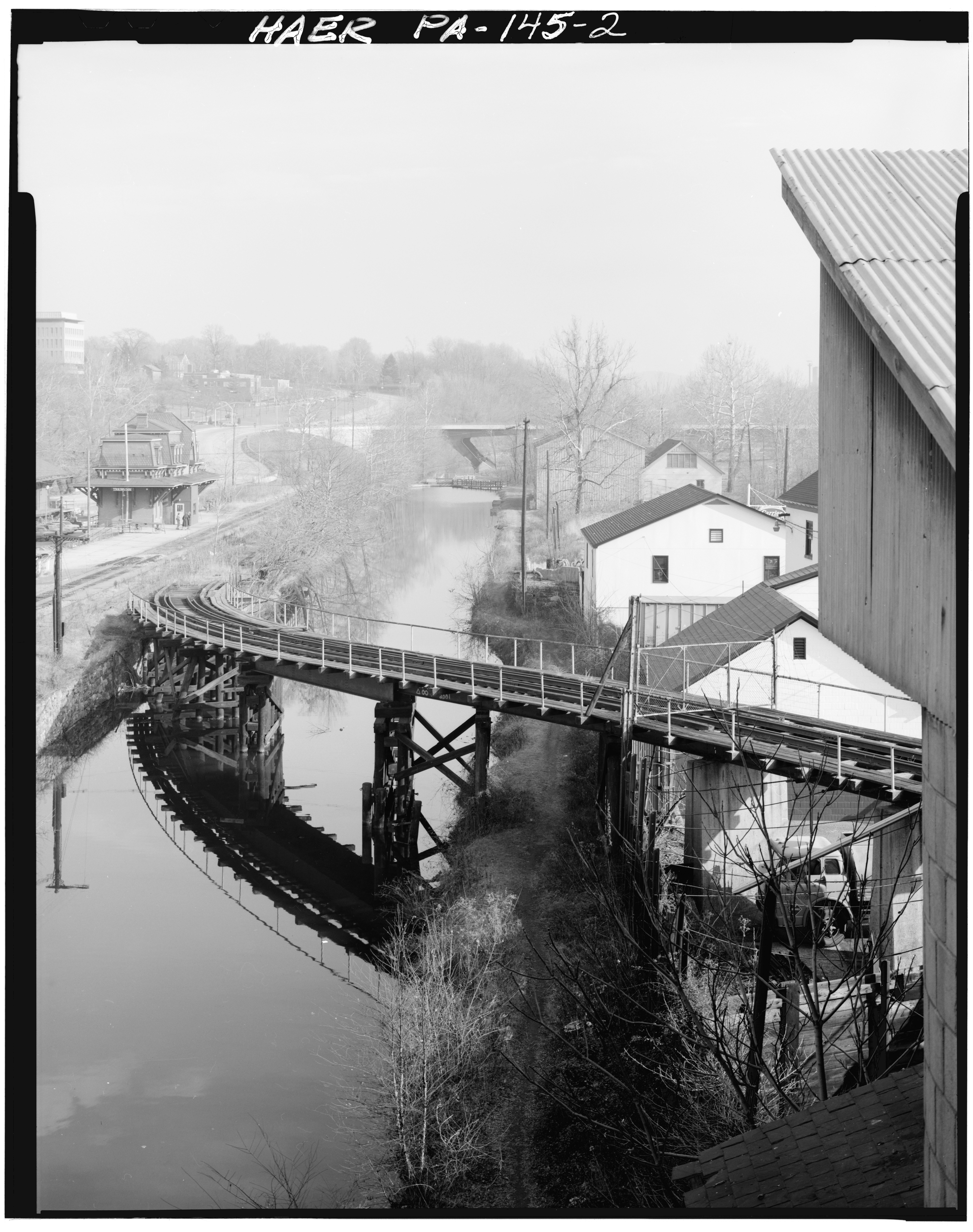
The Lehigh Canal on the south side of Lehigh Street in Bethlehem, Pennsylvania in the mid-20th century

The Lehigh Coal Mine Company (LCMC) was founded in 1792, a few months after anthracite was discovered at Sharp Mountain, a peak of the Pisgah Ridge near present-day Summit Hill, Pennsylvania; (Note: Sharp Mountain is also the name of the extension of the Pisgah Ridge across the Little Schuylkill river gap (valley) opposite Tamaqua. The USGS and local usage shifted the names so Mount Pisgah (the peak over Mauch Chunk at the end of the northeast portion of the ridge) also assumed the Pisgah. The creek south of the ridge was named Mauch Chunk Creek, after the next ridge south.) Its principals secured rights to over 10,000 acres (40 km^{2}) before the Lehigh Canal was built. The company found it fairly easy to find and mine coal from a pit on the mountainside. The coal had to be loaded into sacks and then onto pack animals, which carried the coal at least 9 miles (14 km) to the Lehigh shore. Disposable skiffs known as arks were built from local timber, which were manned along the lower Lehigh River rapids. Despite many politically connected stockholders and officers, the operation was unsupervised by upper management.

With no officer willing to manage from the field, the LCMC hired contractors or sent out teams, which was only sporadically successful in getting coal to Philadelphia. Firewood and charcoal were expensive and hard to find in the eastern U.S. by the War of 1812. Before the war, the LCMC's record of getting coal to market was so dismal that coal imported from England was cheaper and more readily available. The War of 1812 gave the company an incentive to send another expedition by independent contractors in 1813. After a year, they had built five boats but brought only two to market. This resulted in another financial loss for the company and proved the last straw for many of the company's backers, who were unwilling to fund more expeditions.

The Lehigh Coal & Navigation Company, its founder Josiah White and White's protégé and partner Erskine Hazard (operations managers into the mid-1860s) established a reputation for innovation. White and Hazard researched (or invented) emerging technologies as needed, pioneering industrial innovations including the first wire suspension bridge over the Schuylkill River. (Note: White and Hazard had a nail factory and wire mill at the "Falls of the Schuylkill", a rapids along the present East Falls and Wissahickon neighborhoods in North Philadelphia)

There are few rivers, the navigation of which has been more the subject of legislation than that of the Lehigh.

The river was first declared a public highway on the fourteenth of March, 1761, and an Act, supplementary to this, was passed in 1771. Acts, conferring corporate privileges on the Lehigh Navigation Company, were passed February 27th, 1798, March 7th, 1810, March 22d, 1814, March 19th, 1816, and March 24th, 1817. By 1818, however, considerable sums were expended with limited progress.

On March 20, 1818, the new Lehigh Navigation and Coal Company was given expanded ownership of the Lehigh Canal to encourage the canal's development with the understanding that the state might at some point exercise its right to require the canal be made a two-way water transport highway with appropriate locks and dams.

=== Background ===
The lower canal began as a collection of removed stone obstructions and low rock dams with a system of wooden "bear-trap locks" invented by Lehigh Navigation and Coal Company managing partner Josiah White, who debugged scale models of the lock design on Mauch Chunk Creek. Experiments with the bear-trap locks gave Bear Lane, an alley in Mauch Chunk off Broadway in today's Jim Thorpe, Pennsylvania, its name. White and partner Erskine Hazard, who operated a wire mill, foundry and nail factory at the Falls of the Schuylkill, needed energy. After learning the value of anthracite during the British blockades in 1814, White and Hazard joined a number of Philadelphians in a joint-stock venture to build the Schuylkill Canal but quarreled with those on the board of managers who did not favor rapid development. They learned that the managers of the Lehigh Coal Mine Company were willing to option their rights because of their long-term inability to make a profit by transporting anthracite nearly 110 miles (180 km) from Pisgah Ridge. The Lehigh Navigation Company held a charter to improve the navigability of the Lehigh River, but had accomplished little and the charter would expire in 1817. White and Hazard made a proposal specifying improvements for downriver navigation only, and received a charter giving the company ownership of the river in March 1818. The charter had a fall-back provision allowing the legislature to require improvements enabling two-way navigation.

The plan, says Josiah White, who was its originator, was to "improve the navigation of the river by contracting the channels funnel fashion, to bring the whole flow of water at each of the falls to as narrow a compass as the law would allow, by throwing up the round river stones into low walls not higher than we wanted to raise the water for the required depth of fifteen or eighteen inches by the natural flow, to make artificial freshets to supply the deficiency; that is, by making ponds of water of as many acres as we could get, and letting it off periodically, say once in three days. I supposed we could gather water enough to secure the required quantity, and thus secure a regular descending navigation. The plan for locks and gates for letting out the freshet in a proper manner was left for the present to be devised in due time if found necessary.

— Fredrick Brenckman, History of Carbon County (1884)

=== Lower canal ===
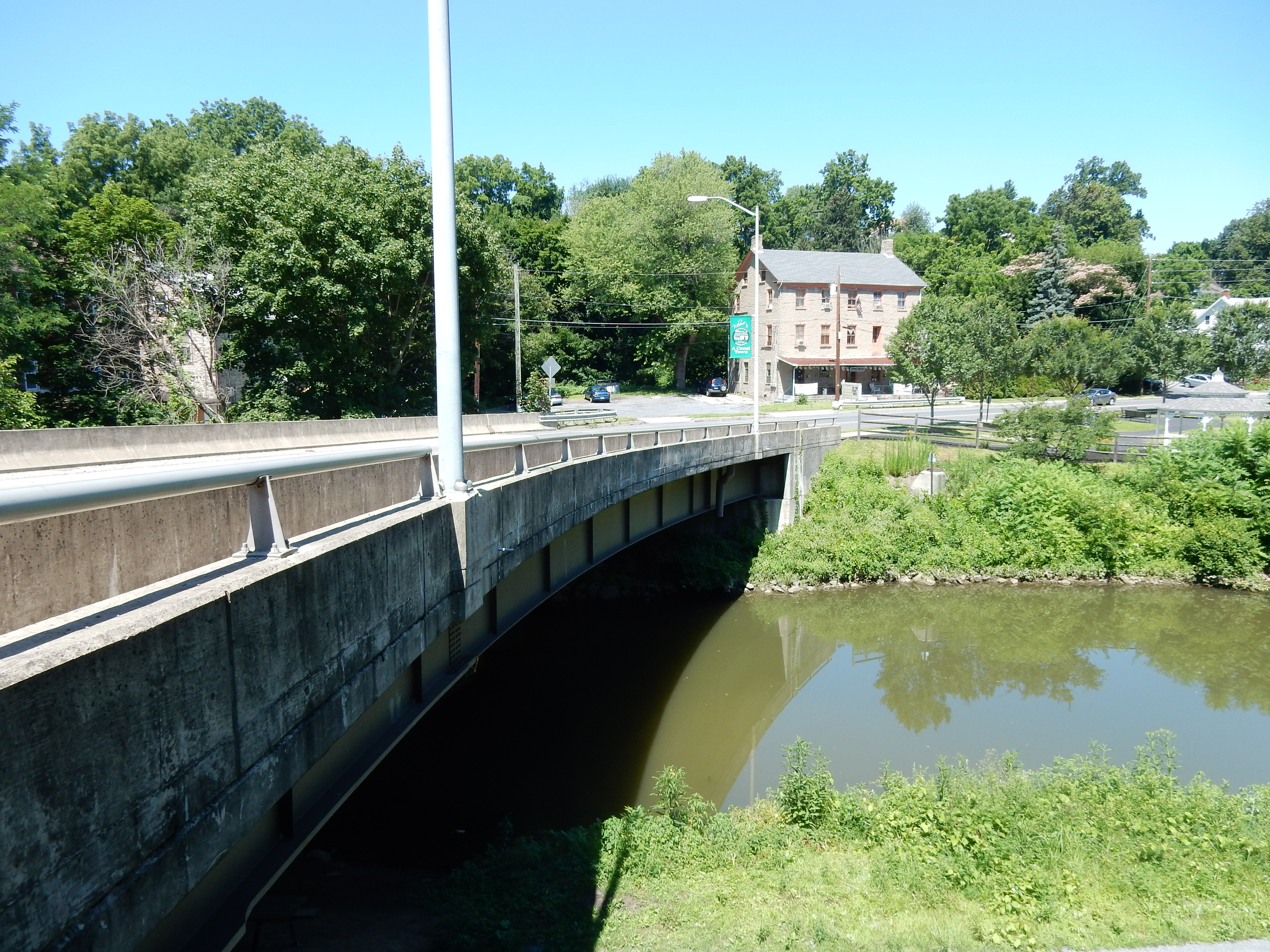
Main Street Bridge over the canal in Freemansburg in July 2015

Sometimes called the Stone Coal Turnpike, the lower canal (46.5 miles (74.8 km)) was built between 1818 and 1820 by the Lehigh Navigation Company to supply coal to Eastern seaboard cities and operated as a toll road with downriver traffic only. It was later rebuilt with locks supporting two-way traffic between 1827 and 1829 by the Lehigh Coal & Navigation Company and remained in operation until 1931. The lower canal connected the eastern part of the southern Coal Region to the Delaware River basin (primarily the Panther Creek Valley, Nesquehoning Creek Valley and mines in Beaver Meadows and along Black Creek), connecting via Penn Haven Junction to the canal head at Mauch Chunk in present-day Jim Thorpe, Pennsylvania.

The lower canal began below Packers Dam. A wing wall projected into the upper pool to create slack water next to the loading docks, at the same level as the top of the first guard dam. That dam (known as Dam 1) was downstream of Broadway, opposite Flagstaff Hill and the cross-canal Bear Mountain for which Mauch Chunk was named. The 44 lift locks begin with Lock 1 at the dam. This was a weighing lock, using a platform which lifted a barge and weighed the boat and its load. Each non-LC&NC barge on the canal was recorded. Empty weights were subtracted, and tolls were assessed by the ton per mile traveled. Most of the 44 locks on the descent to Easton were spillway variants of White's bear-trap lock. When tipped or triggered, they released several acre-feet (creating a wave to raise the water level as the canal boat sank downriver). (Note: The delay in completing the Delaware Canal was listed as an extra expense in the LC&N's annual reports. Brenckman and "The Delaware and Lehigh Canals" note that the political decision slowing its start and the poor design and construction of the Delaware Canal were costly for the Lehigh Coal & Navigation Company.) The canal carried central Lehigh Valley anthracite to northeastern urban markets, particularly Philadelphia, Trenton and Wilmington, and supporting new industry in Bristol, Allentown and Bethlehem, Pennsylvania with the Morris and Delaware and Raritan Canals and a number of railroads. The privately funded canal became part of the Pennsylvania Canal system, a complex of canals, towpaths and (eventually) railroads.

==== Initial construction ====
The lower canal improvements were initially designed and engineered by LC&N founder Josiah White (Note: White, a foundry and wire-mill owner needing fuel, was behind systematic investigations which determined several successful ways to use anthracite industrially and for heating in 1813.) after the company become disenchanted with the Schuylkill Canal's board of directors. By the winter of 1814, the company was interested in transporting Lehigh Valley coal to Philadelphia.

By late 1822, skepticism about anthracite was waning. (Note: The Philadelphia brothers spearheading the Wyoming Valley's coal road were inspired by the early Erie Canal (first used in 1821) and the LC&N's success. By 1823 they sought investors for the Delaware and Hudson Canal, which included the Delaware and Hudson Gravity Railroad. The D&H project was devised to ship anthracite to New York City, already seeing an uptick in commerce from the Erie Canal.) The cost of building an ark for every load of coal delivered to the Philadelphia docks in 1822 (as LC&N operations were hitting their stride) worried the company's board of directors. By mid-1822, managing director Josiah White was consulting with veteran Erie-Canal lock engineer Canvass White. By late in the year, White had shifted construction efforts from improving the one-way system (begun in 1818) to a test project on the four upper dams of the canal. The project involved two-way dams and locks with a wider lift channel and lengths of over 120 feet (37 m), capable of taking a steam tug and a coastal cargo ship from 45.6 miles (73.4 km) from the Delaware to the slack-water pool at Mauch Chunk. In 1823, White and Hazard proposed a plan to the Pennsylvania legislature.

==== Further construction ====
In 1823, after building and testing four locks, Josiah White made a proposal to the Pennsylvania legislature to continue the improvements down the Lehigh River. His plan included locks suitable for a coastal schooner and towing steam tug, the types of boats which dominated ports along the 62 miles (100 km) of the Delaware River controlled by the LC&N. The following year, the legislature rejected his proposal; lumber and timber interests feared that damming would prevent them from rafting logs on the rivers to local sawmills. White and Hazard scrambled to increase mine production while producing enough lumber for arks to send their coal along the Delaware to Philadelphia. In 1827, a revision to the Main Line of Public Works funded the promised Delaware Canal. The LC&N began converting the canal to support two-way operation, work which continued into 1829. In 1831, the LC&N stopped making one-way arks and began building large, durable barges, expecting their return via a connection with the Delaware Division of the Pennsylvania Canal in Easton.

The expanded Lehigh Canal extended 46 miles (74 km), between Mauch Chunk and Easton. Its 52 locks, eight guard locks, eight dams and six aqueducts allowed the waterway to rise over 350 feet (107 m) in elevation. A weigh lock .5 miles (0.80 km) south of Mauch Chunk determined canal-boat fees. A cable-ferry connection across the Delaware River to the Morris Canal and through New Jersey created a more-direct route from the Lehigh Canal to New York City. To the south, the Delaware and Raritan Canal had a complementary 22-mile (35 km) canal built along the east bank of the Delaware.

=== Upper canal ===
Inspired by the successful transport of freight over the Allegheny Front escarpment via the Allegheny Portage Railroad system, during the mid-1830s the business community and the legislature sought a 26-mile (42 km) extension. The Upper Lehigh Canal, designed by Canvass White, was built from 1837 to 1843 as authorized by the 1837 revision of the Main Line of Public Works.

The upper Lehigh was a turbulent river with steep sides; a large portion was in a ravine, the Lehigh Gorge. The upper canal rose over 600 feet (183 m) in elevation to the Mauch Chunk slack-water pool. Unlike the lower canal (where most locks lifted less than 6 feet (1.8 m) in easy stages, the upper-canal design relied on deep-lift locks. The maximum lift on the lower canal was less than 20 feet (6.1 m), but the upper-canal locks lifted a maximum of 58 feet (18 m); this is comparable to the lift of the lower canal in a bit over half the distance, using less than 11/18 as many locks per mile. The upper canal design's 20 dams, 29 locks and a number of reservoirs provided working flow even in dry summers.

The project included four major construction hurdles and three new railroad projects, for which LC&N created a new subsidiary: the Lehigh and Susquehanna Railroad (LH&S). From north to south, the rail projects were:

1. The rail connection from the Pennsylvania Canal landing docks at Pittston to an assembly rail yard in Ashley
2. The Ashley Planes incline plane railway below Penobscot Knob and through a 1-mile (1.6 km) cutting, a man-made ravine over 100 feet (30 m) deep connecting to an assembly rail yard in Mountain Top
3. A marshaling yard in Mountain Top with a railroad running down a ridge to White Haven and the new upper-canal docks, with a turnaround staging yard at the docks. In 1855, as competition increased, the canal reached its peak of more than one million tons of cargo. After that, coal shipped through the Schuylkill Valley supplanted coal supplied by the Lehigh Canal.

=== Collapse ===
In 1862, the canal collapsed when a wet spring repeatedly overfilled embankment dam reservoirs until the dam above White Haven failed, triggering a cascade of failing dams in a flood on June 4. Between 100 and 200 people died in the villages and canal works below. The Pennsylvania legislature forbade the rebuilding of the upper canal. The canal was used for transportation until the 1940s, about a decade after similar canals ceased operations, and it was North America's last fully functioning towpath canal. In 1962, most of the canal was sold to private and public organizations for recreational use.

=== Modern history ===
Several segments of the canal were listed on the National Register of Historic Places in 1979, including "Lehigh Canal", "Carbon County Section of the Lehigh Canal" (#79002179), "Lehigh Canal: Eastern Section Glendon and Abbott Street Industrial Sites" (#78002437) and "Lehigh Canal; Allentown to Hopeville Section" (#79002307). For the Carbon County section, also known as "Upper Canal Lock #1 to Lower Canal Dam #3", the listing included 30 contributing structures.

The eastern section (now preserved as a recreational-boating area) runs along the Lehigh River from Hopeville to the confluence of the Lehigh and Delaware Rivers in Easton and includes the Chain Bridge, which was NRHP-listed in 1974. The eastern-section listing is for a 260-acre (110 ha) area with three contributing buildings, seven contributing sites and 11 contributing structures. The Allentown-to-Hopeville section is a 53.9-acre (21.8 ha) area which includes Greek Revival and Federal architecture in its contributing building and 13 contributing structures.

== Present activities ==
An 8-mile (13-km) segment of the canal towpath has been converted into a multi-use trail from Freemansburg through Bethlehem to Allentown. The trail runs along the river and active railroad tracks. A section near Jim Thorpe is also accessible to recreational users. The final section in Easton is maintained and operated by the National Canal Museum. Other short sections are accessible, but portions of the canal towpath are worn and unsafe to access.

== Gallery ==
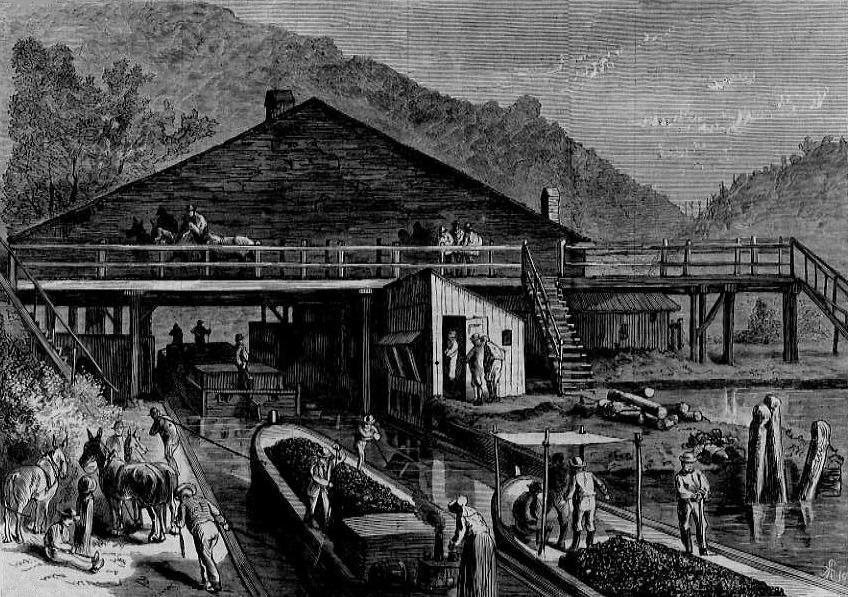
Weigh lock with scales to determine tolls in 1873

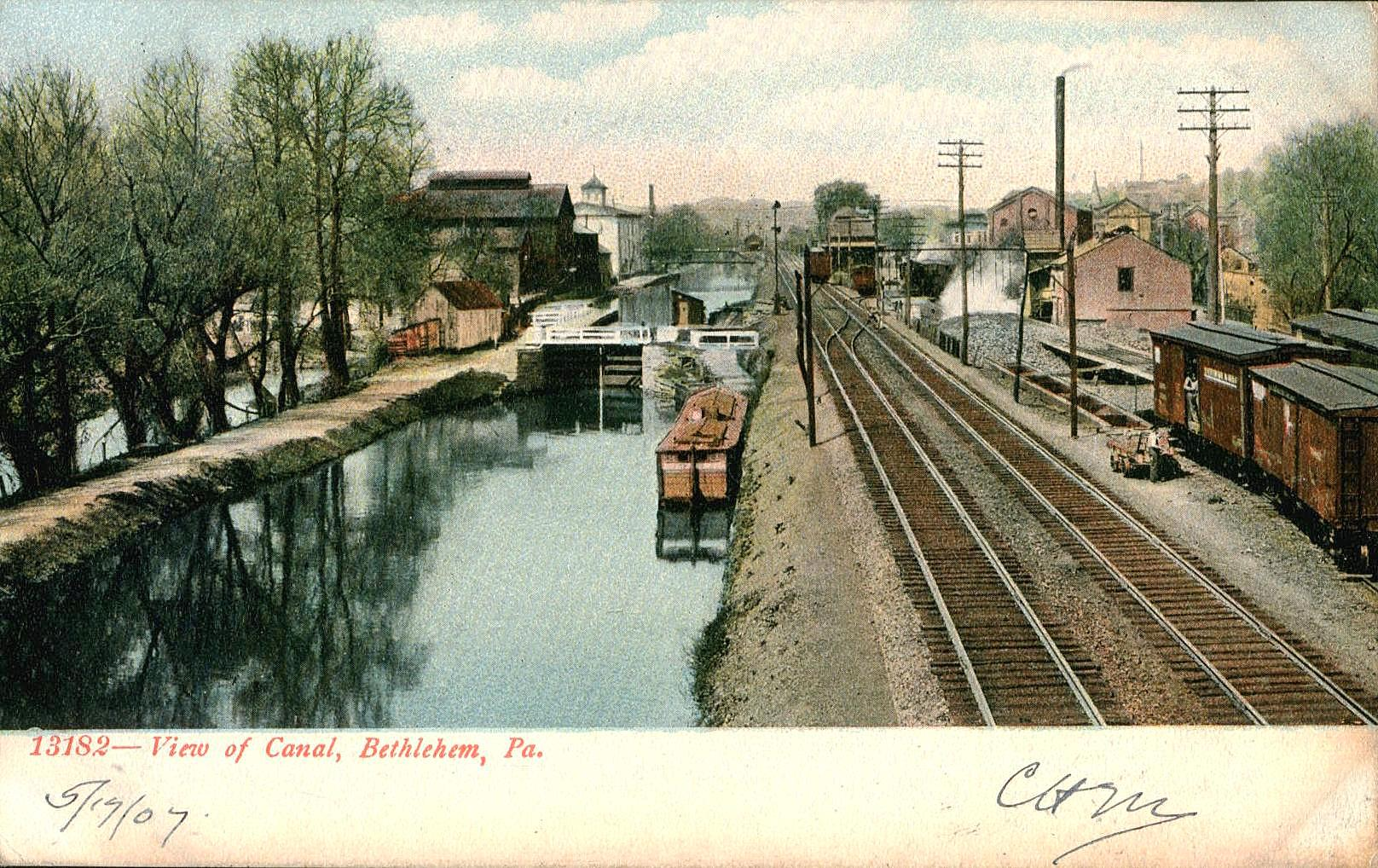
The canal in Bethlehem in 1907

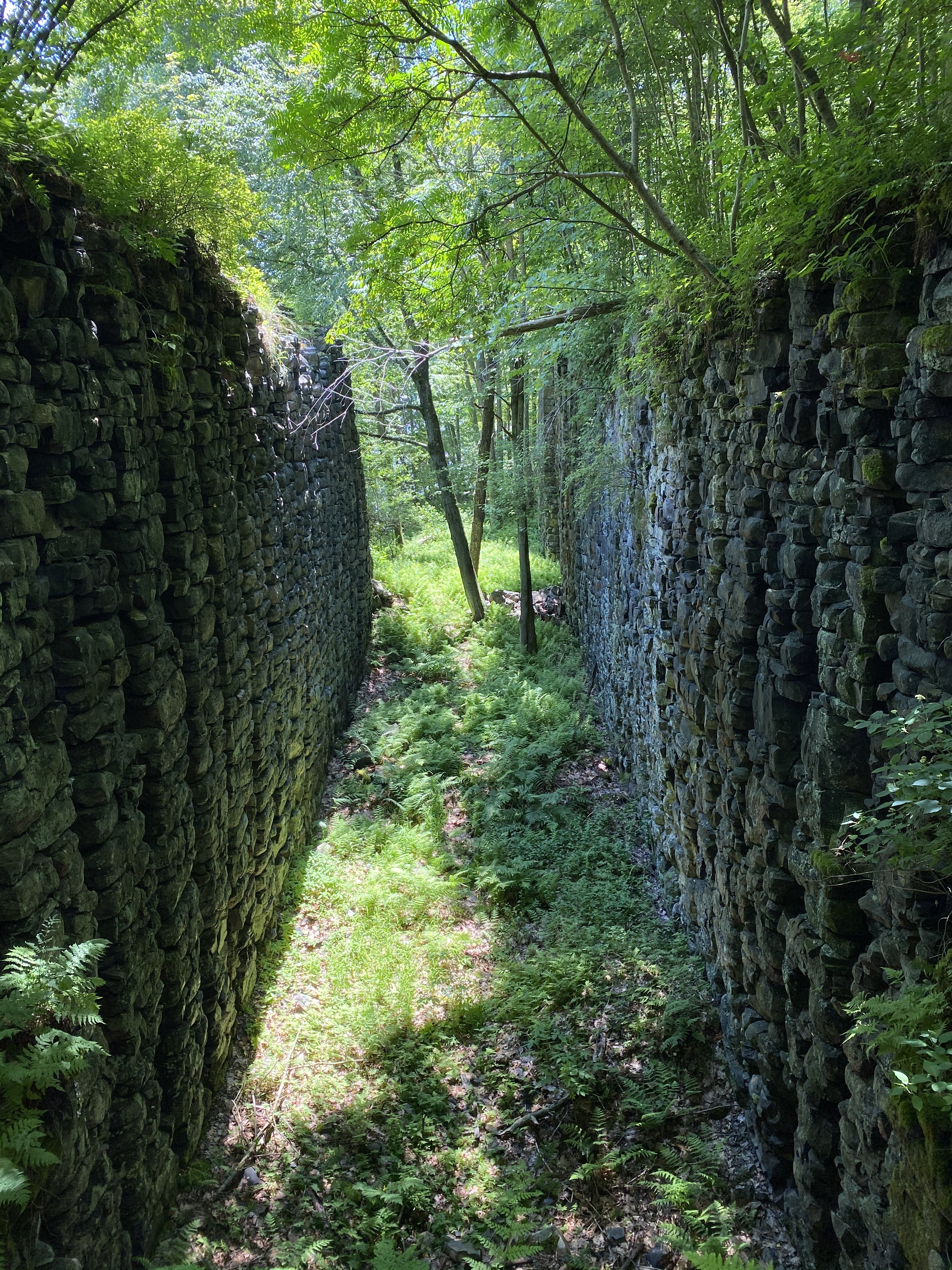
The remains of Upper Canal Lock 24 in 2020

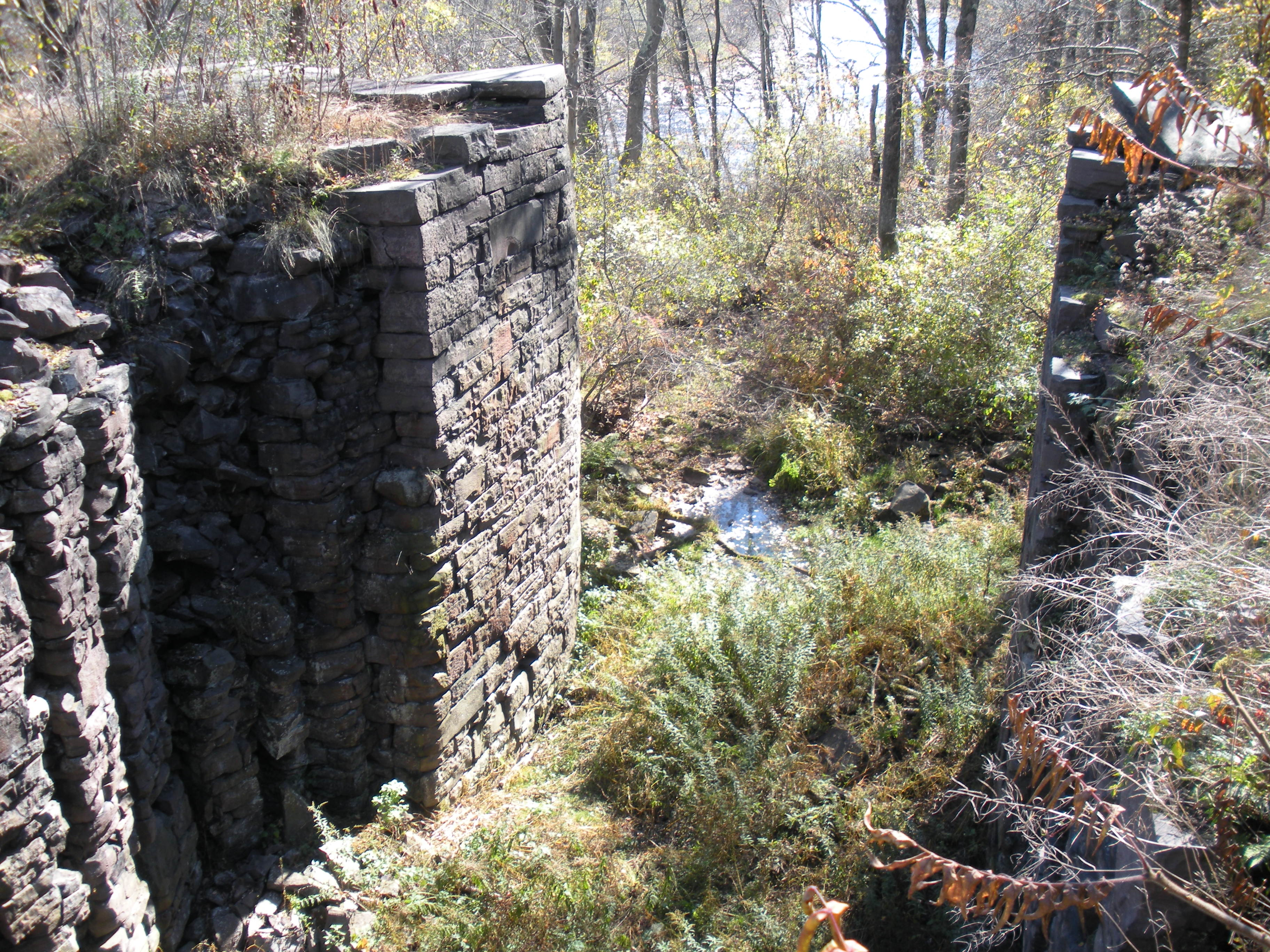
The entrance to Lock 28 near White Haven in 2008

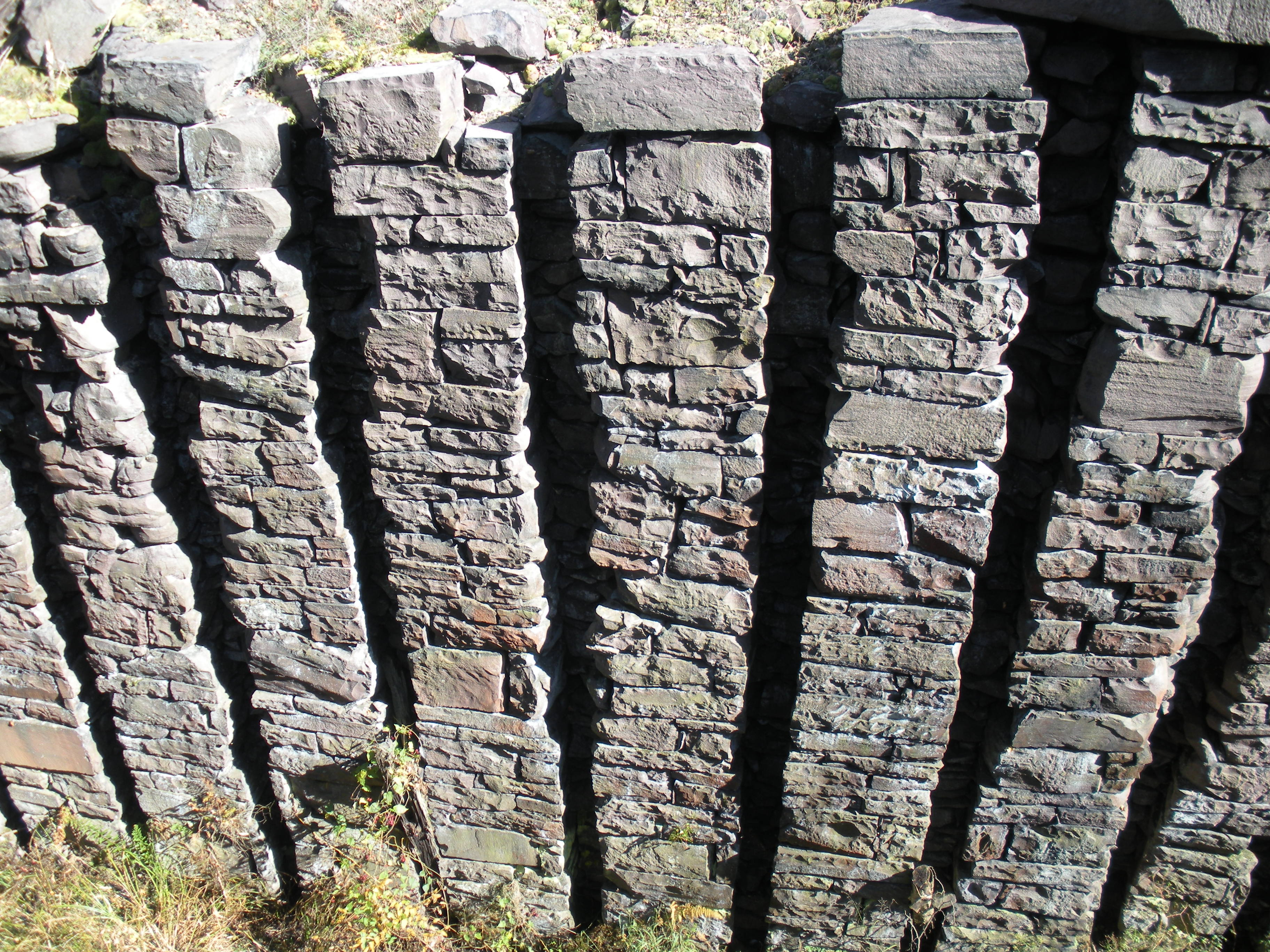
The stacked-rock of Upper Canal Lock 28 near White Haven in 2008

== See also ==
- Delaware and Lehigh National Heritage Corridor
- List of canals in the United States
- Allegheny Aqueduct
- Delaware Canal – A sister canal from the mouth of the Lehigh River and canal terminus, feeding urban Philadelphia connecting with the Morris and Lehigh Canals at their respective Easton terminals.
- Delaware and Hudson Canal - Another early coal canal
- Delaware and Raritan Canal – A New Jersey canal connection to the New York and New Jersey markets shipping primarily coal across the Delaware River. The D&R also shipped Iron Ore from New Jersey up the Lehigh.
- Chesapeake and Delaware Canal – A canal crossing the Delmarva Peninsula in the states of Delaware and Maryland, connecting the Chesapeake Bay with the Delaware Bay.
- Delaware and Hudson Canal – Another early built coal canal as the American canal age began; contemporary with the Lehigh and the Schuylkill navigations.
- Morris Canal – Another important American Industrial Revolution canal feeding steel mills ores from Central New Jersey and coal to New York and New Jersey Markets.
- Pennsylvania Canal System – an ambitious collection of far-flung canals, and eventually railroads authorized early in 1826.
- Schuylkill Canal – Navigation joining Reading and Philadelphia. (Note: The Schuylkill Canal was long delayed by investors quarreling over the best way to proceed. Disgusted, White and Erskine Hazard explored tapping Anthracite supplies via the Lehigh, and ended up incorporating the Lehigh Coal & Navigation Company which spearheaded many technological initiatives.)
- Union canal - 1811 private stock company that completed the "golden link between the Schuylkill and Susquehanna rivers in 1828, thereby connecting the Schuylkill Navigation company with the Pennsylvania canal in Middleton."
