= Changzhou Ancient Canal =

Canal in Jiangsu Province, China

Changzhou Ancient Canal (Chinese: 常州古运河) is a 44.2-kilometre canal in China, which runs in the southeast–northwest direction in Changzhou of Jiangsu Province, China.

== History ==
The Changzhou Ancient Canal is part of the Grand Canal, part of the Jiangnan canal section which was dug in the Sui dynasty (581–618 CE). Standing in Piling Station (in Chinese: 毗陵驿) which is located on the north shore of the canal has kept looking at the transport fleet in the canal. Piling station is one of the largest ancient China waterway stations. It was responsible for passing the emperors' imperial edicts and writs about military situations. Besides, it also used to receive high-ranking officials which is famous in Jiangnan.

For nearly two thousand years, the ancient canal has been the largest river of Changzhou, forming the specific features and cultural characteristics of Changzhou, which is a city owning pink wall and black tile, a small bridge over the flowing stream, plowing people and people living along the river. The businessmen trade, canal water transport, wood, rice, bean, fruit, tea industry and the national industry and commerce have contributed to the economic and historical culture of Changzhou. The ancient canal has rich human resources and places of interest (including several archeological sites), and the protection and cultivation of these unique intangible cultural heritages has very significant and profound influence on the development of Changzhou. During the 28th World Heritage Convention, the Chinese related department prepared to apply the canal as the alternative project of the World Heritage Site with other 17 cities.

== Description ==
The headwater of the Changzhou Ancient Canal is derives from Grate Kei Lane and reaches Dongpo Park (Chinese: 东坡公园) in the north. If one takes the Huafang Ship from Grate dustpan-shaped vessel lane wharf from which Qianlong Emperor has asored several times, there is an ancient alley full of historical sites, archaic rhyme and literary quotations. The hundred-meter-long alley contains Piling station, Huaghua Pavilion and Grate beam lights, Along the ancient canal from Hangzhou to Changzhou, one passes the Outfitting the boat Pavilion, also called Dongpo Outfitting the boat Pavilion because it is related to Su Shi.

Today, with the Outfitting of the boat Pavilion (in Chinese: 舣舟亭) being the centre, it formed the Dongpo Park which combines Changzhou Ancient Canal, historical sites and new sceneries. Dongpo Washing inkstone, Beiting Qianlong, and Imperial Wharf all belonged to the city heritage objects. The Dongpo Park has been the best position for overlooking the grand Changzhou Ancient Canal.
