= Chain Bridge (Easton, Pennsylvania) =

Historic bridge in Pennsylvania, United States

- Change Bridge
- U.S. National Register of Historic Places
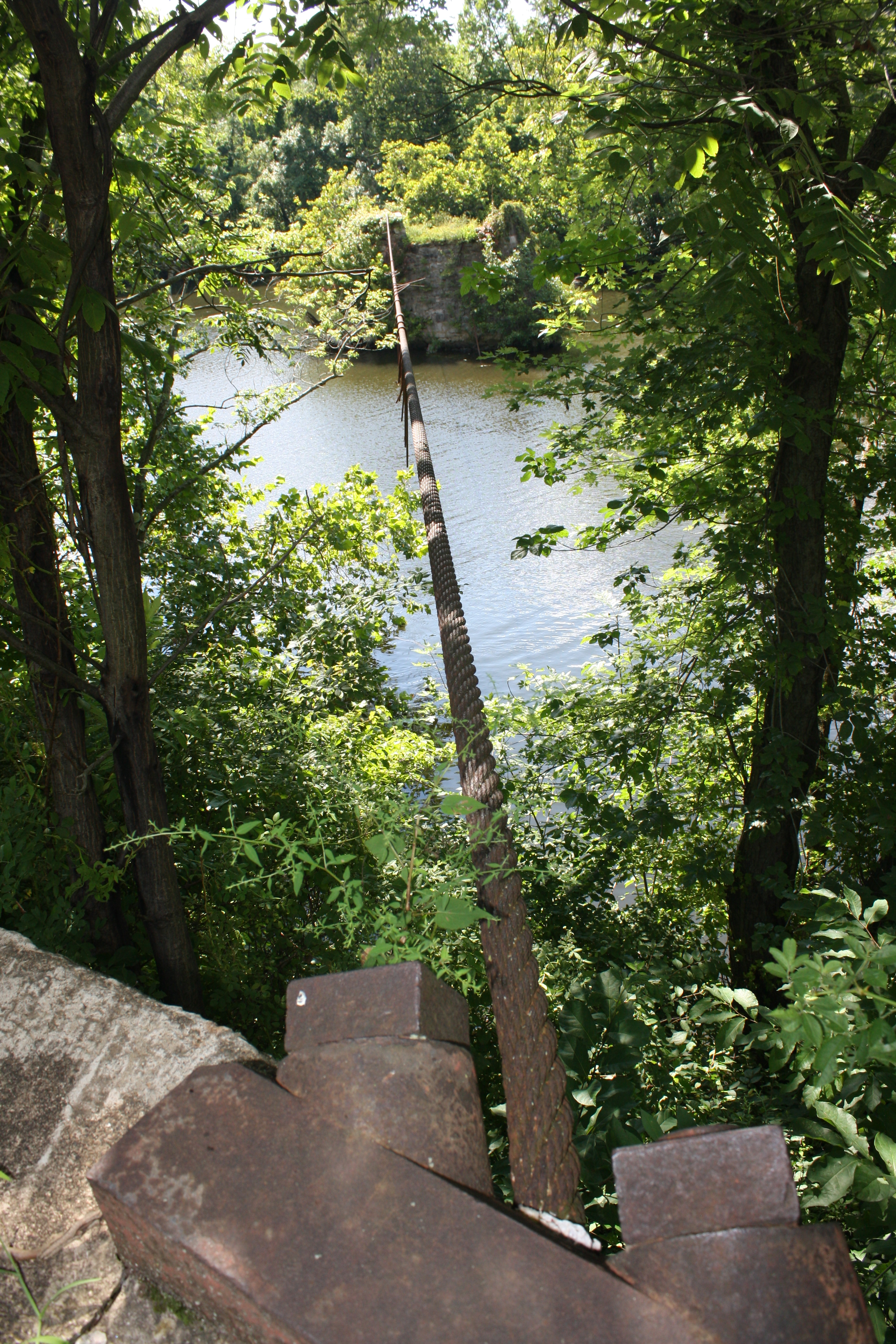
- Chain Bridge in Easton, Pennsylvania in August 2013.

- Location within Pennsylvania Location within the United States
- Nearest city: Southwest of Glendon on Hugh Moore Parkway across the Lehigh River, Palmer Township and Williams Township, Pennsylvania
- Coordinates: 40°39′14″N 75°14′56″W
- Area: 5 acres (2.0 ha)
- Built: 1856-1857
- Built by: Douglas, E.A. (engineer), Lehigh Coal and Navigation Company
- NRHP reference No.: 74001798
- Added to NRHP: February 12, 1974

Chain Bridge or Change Bridge, also known as the Lehigh Canal Swinging Bridge and as Wire Towing Path at Pool No. 8, is a historic change bridge spanning the Lehigh River at Palmer Township and Williams Township, Northampton County, Pennsylvania. It was built in 1856–1857, and consists of three stone piers and two spans. Each pier is approximately 30 feet high. In 1972, the bridge consisted of the piers and the cable.

The chain bridge was listed on the National Register of Historic Places in 1974. The NRHP listing included a 5-acre (2.0 ha) area. It is included within a large historic district, Lehigh Canal: Eastern Section Glendon and Abbott Street Industrial Sites, which has numerous other structures and buildings, and which was listed on the NRHP in 1979.

== Gallery ==
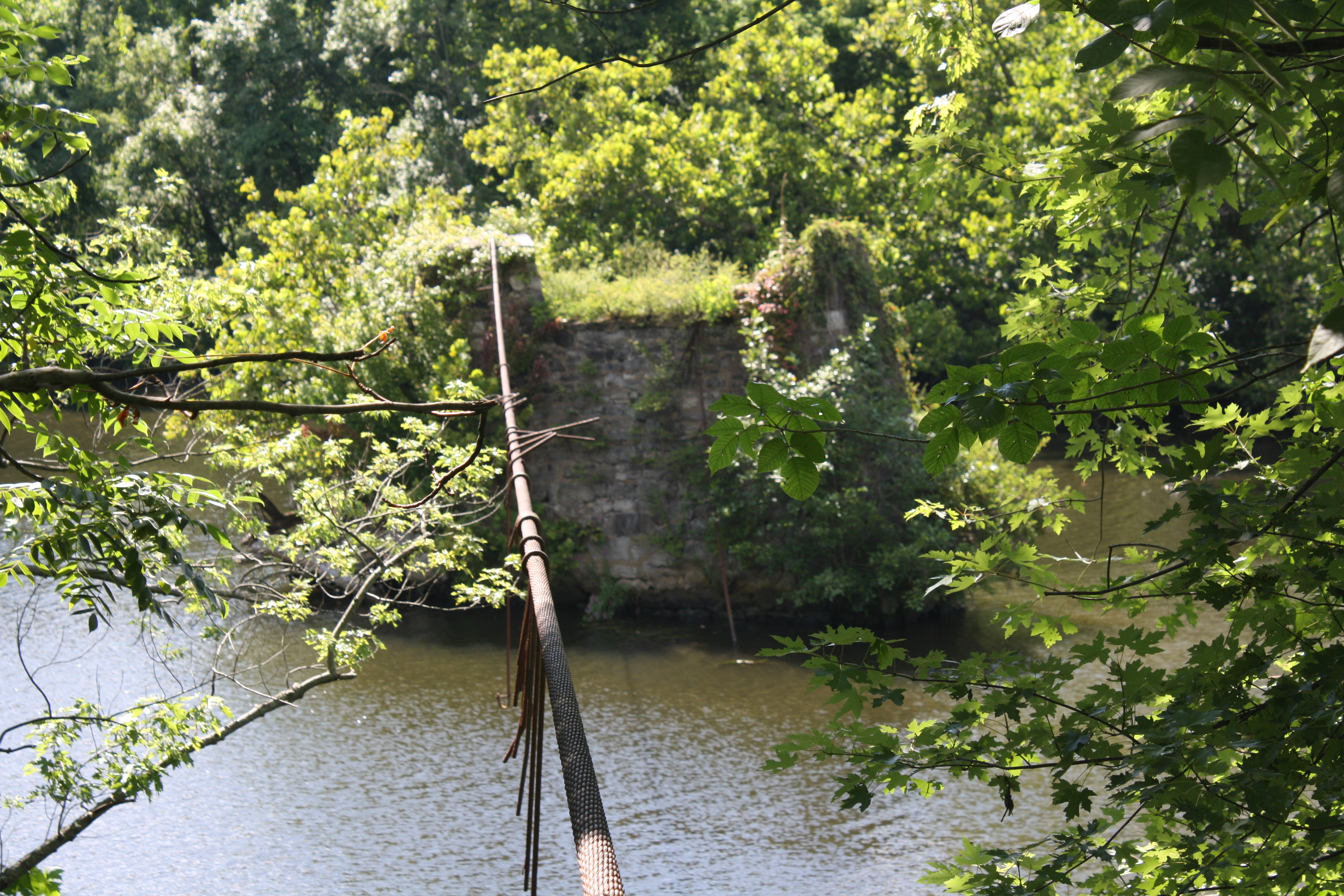
The central pier

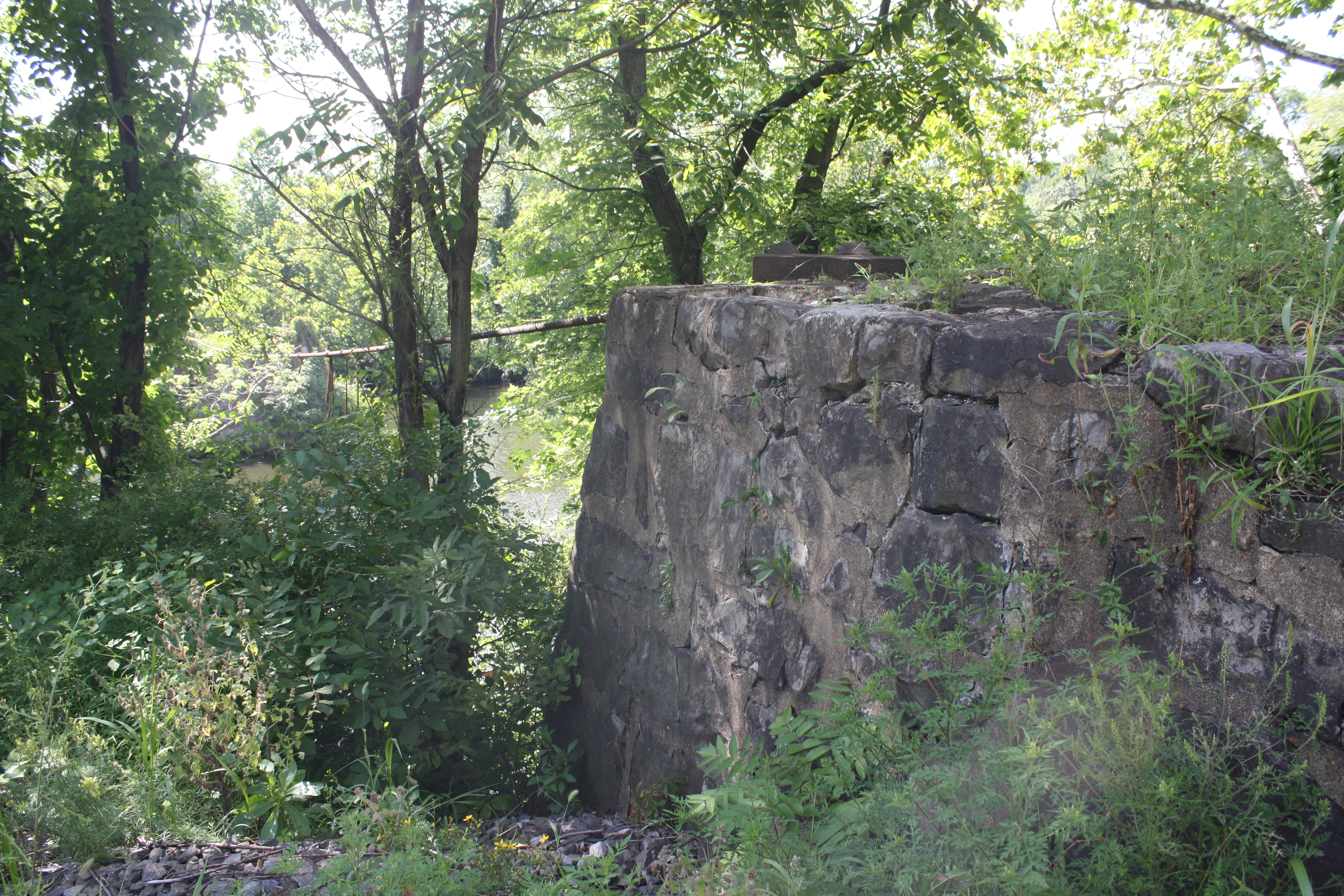
The right pier
