= Canvass White =

American engineer and inventor

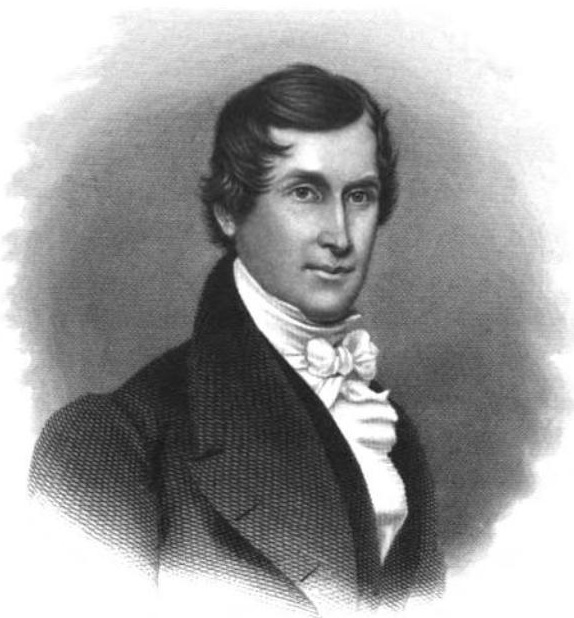
- White depicted in an 1871 illustration
- Born: September 8, 1790; Whitestown, New York, U.S.
- Died: December 18, 1834 (aged 44); St. Augustine, Florida, U.S.
- Education: Fairfield Academy
- Engineering career
- Discipline: Civil engineer
- Projects: Erie Canal, Delaware and Raritan Canal
- Significant advance: Rosendale cement

Signature
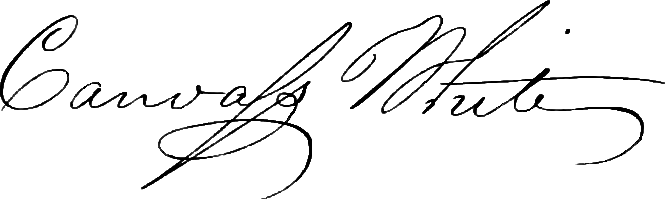

Canvass White (September 8, 1790 – December 18, 1834) was an American engineer and inventor. He was chief engineer at the Delaware and Raritan Canal and he patented Rosendale cement, which became the dominant cement in the United States until 1900.

== Early life and education ==
White was born on September 8, 1790, in Whitestown, New York to Hugh White, Jr. (January 16, 1763 - April 7, 1827) and Tryphena Lawrence White (July 4, 1768 - March 30, 1800, a native of Canaan, Connecticut).

He received his education at the Fairfield Academy.

== Career ==
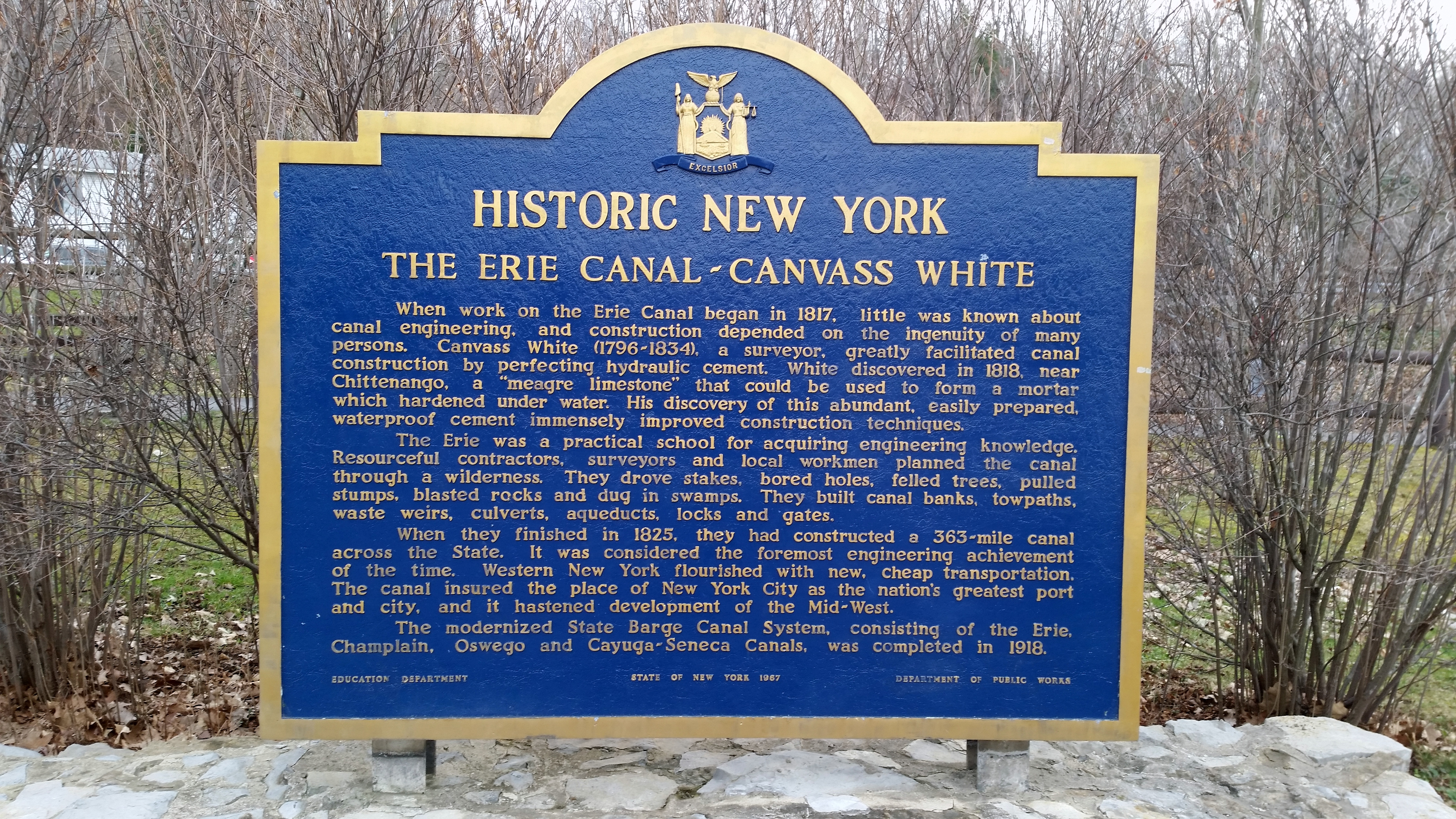
New York state historic marker at Old Erie Canal State Historic Park in Manlius, New York

White's first job as an engineer was on the Erie Canal in 1816, working for chief engineer Judge Benjamin Wright. In the autumn of 1817, he traveled to England to study their canal system. When he returned he patented a type of natural cement, Rosendale cement which was used to build some of the major works in the US including the Delaware and Hudson Canal and Brooklyn Bridge. He continued his work in New York until 1824.

From 1824 until the summer of 1826, he was chief engineer on the Union Canal in Pennsylvania. He was appointed Chief Engineer of the Delaware and Raritan Canal in 1825 and of the Lehigh Canal in 1827. He was also a consulting engineer for the Schuylkill Navigation Company and for the Chesapeake and Delaware Canal. He became president of the Cohoes Company when it was incorporated on March 28, 1826. He was also highly involved in the design of the Croton Aqueduct though the position of chief engineer eventually went to John B. Jervis.

Of White, author Bill Bryson writes, "the great unsung Canvass White didn't just make New York rich; more profoundly, he helped make America."

== Works ==
Works of White's that survive include:

- Carbon County section of the Lehigh Canal, along the Lehigh River in and around Weissport, Pennsylvania, listed on the National Register of Historic Places (NRHP)
- Enfield Canal, along the Connecticut River from Windsor Locks N to Thompsonville Windsor Locks, Connecticut, NRHP-listed
- Lehigh Canal, Lehigh Gap to S Walnutport boundary Walnutport, Pennsylvania, NRHP-listed
- Lehigh Canal, Walnutport to Allentown section, Allentown, Pennsylvania and vicinity, NRHP-listed
- Lehigh Canal: eastern section, Glendon and Abbott Street industrial sites, Lehigh River from Hopeville to confluence of Lehigh and Delaware Rivers in Easton, Pennsylvania, NRHP-listed
- Lehigh Canal Allentown to Hopeville Section, along the Lehigh River, Bethlehem, Pennsylvania, NRHP-listed
- Union Canal Tunnel, west of Lebanon off PA Route 72 in Lebanon, Pennsylvania, NRHP-listed

== Death ==
White died in 1834 and was buried in Princeton Cemetery in Princeton, New Jersey.

== See also ==
- Josiah White
