= Weigh lock =

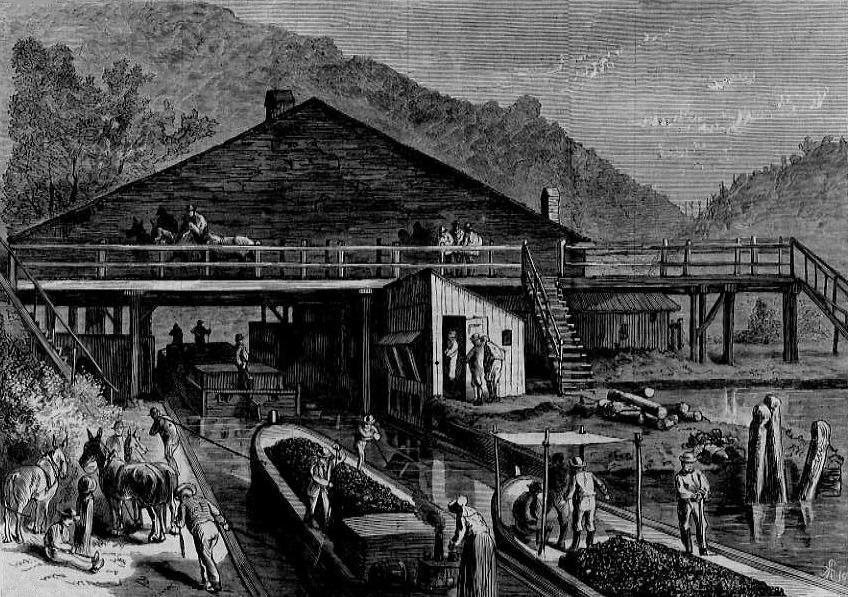
A weigh lock on the Lehigh Canal around 1873

A weigh lock is a specialized canal lock designed to determine the weight of barges in order to assess toll payments based upon the weight and value of the cargo carried. This requires that the unladen weight of the barge be known.

A barge to be weighed was brought into a supporting cradle connected by levers to a weighing mechanism. The water was then drained and the scale balance adjusted to determine the barge gross weight. Subtracting the tare weight (the weight of the barge when empty) would give the cargo weight. Originally weighlocks measured the weight of the barge, initially by measuring the displacement of water from the lock by collecting the liquid in a separate measuring chamber after the barge had entered. This method also requires that the unladen weight of the barge be known.

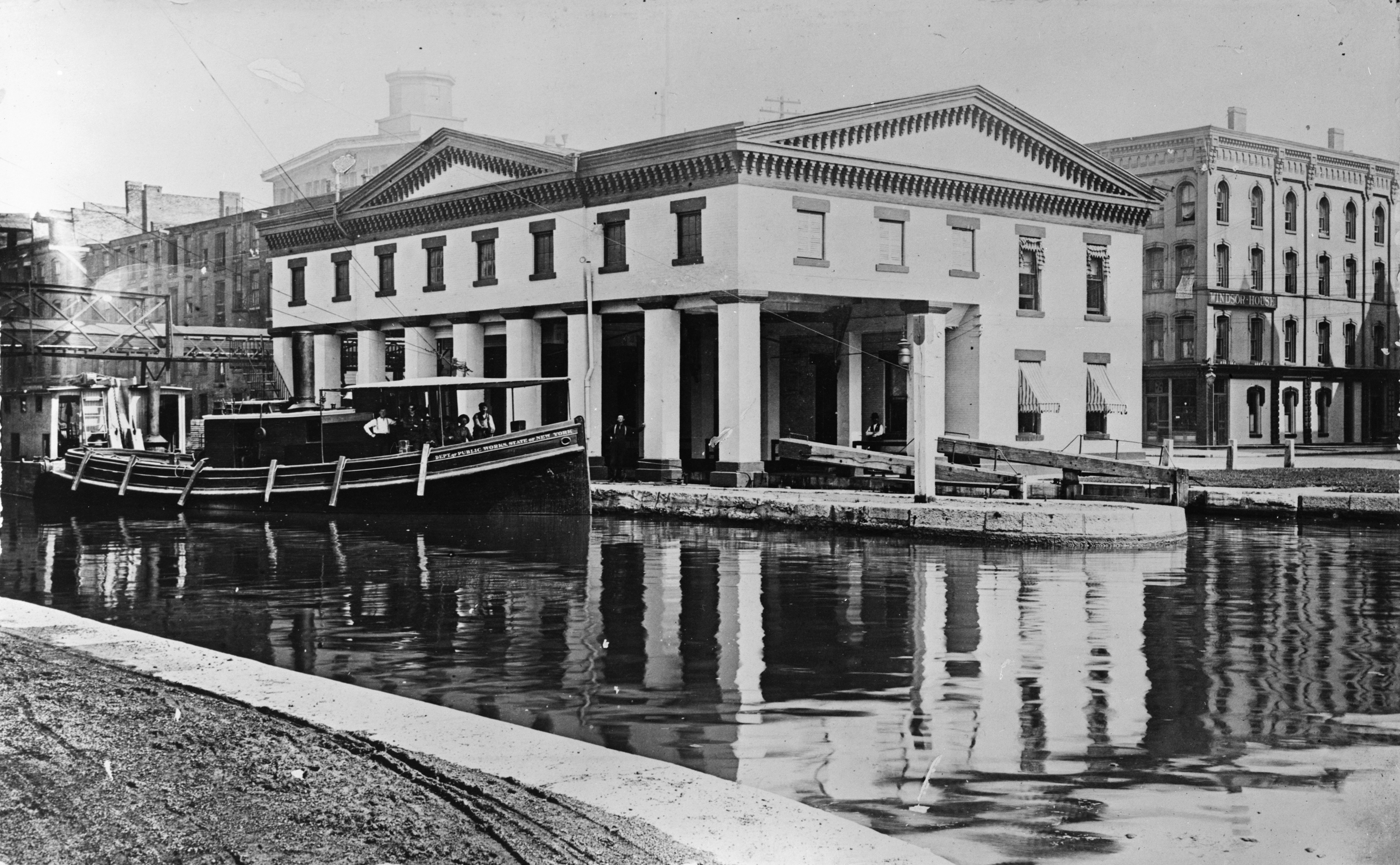
Weigh lock on the Erie Canal in Syracuse, New York, in 1903. Today this building is the Erie Canal Museum. The current canal now passes well behind this location. The old route through the central city has long been filled in and is now a paved boulevard.

== See also ==
- Weigh bridge, a device for weighing trucks and railcars.
