= September 11th National Memorial Trail =

Memorial trail in the eastern United States

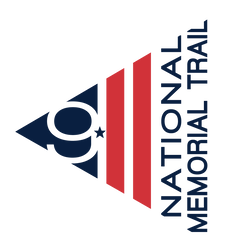
- Official trail logo
- Length: 1,500 miles (2,400 km)
- Location: Mid-Atlantic United States
- Designation: Federally designated trail route (2021), Pennsylvania Statewide Major Greenway (2022)
- Trailheads: Pentagon Memorial, Flight 93 National Memorial, National September 11 Memorial & Museum
- Use: Hiking, cycling
- Surface: Mixed (55% off-road trails, 45% roadways)
- Website: 911trail.org

The September 11th National Memorial Trail (also known as the 9/11 Trail or 9/11 NMT) is a 1,500-mile (2,400 km) network of trails and roadways connecting the three national memorials dedicated to those who lost their lives in the September 11 attacks: the Flight 93 National Memorial near Shanksville, Pennsylvania, the Pentagon Memorial in Arlington, Virginia, and the National September 11 Memorial & Museum in New York City.

The trail serves as a "triangle of remembrance," passing through six Mid-Atlantic states and Washington, D.C. It was officially designated by Congress when President Joe Biden signed H.R. 2278 on October 14, 2021.

== History ==
=== Origins ===
Just five days after the September 11 attacks, on September 16, 2001, David Brickley proposed a "continuously linked multi-purpose, non-motorized trail" to honor those who lost their lives and connect the three attack sites.

The September 11th National Patriot Trail Alliance was formally established in October 2002, with the goal of developing a trail connecting the World Trade Center, Pentagon, and Flight 93 crash site. In January 2009, the organization was renamed to the September 11th National Memorial Trail Alliance to reflect its evolving mission.

Brickley, a former member of the Virginia House of Delegates and veteran, served as the Alliance's founding president until transitioning to President Emeritus. The current President is Jeffery McCauley, with Matt Harris serving as Board Chair.

=== Development ===
Rather than building an entirely new trail, the Alliance worked to connect existing regional trails into a unified route. Initial route mapping began in 2003 with planner Doug Pickford, establishing an original route of approximately 940 miles by 2005. The trail was designed to pass through historic corridors including:

- Johnstown Flood National Memorial
- Allegheny Portage Railroad National Historic Site
- Gettysburg National Military Park
- Antietam National Battlefield

In 2009, the Virginia General Assembly passed Senate Joint Resolution 498, commending the Alliance. In 2011, the Alliance received IRS tax-exempt status and was honored by the Rails-to-Trails Conservancy with a Trail Champions Award. In 2012, Deborah Borza, mother of Flight 93 hero Deora Frances Bodley and an avid cyclist, joined the board of directors.

A major breakthrough came in September 2015 when CSX donated 130 acres of abandoned railroad corridor for a 10-mile trail section from Garrett through Berlin to the Flight 93 National Memorial.

In April 2021, a 1.5-mile (2.4 km) purpose-built section was completed in Somerset County, Pennsylvania, becoming the first trail segment constructed specifically for the 9/11 National Memorial Trail—splitting from the Great Allegheny Passage at the Garrett trailhead.

=== Federal designation ===
On September 11, 2019, Senate Resolution 267, sponsored by Senators Pat Toomey (PA), Mark Warner (VA), and Bob Casey Jr. (PA), passed unanimously, recognizing the trail "as an important trail and greenway."

In May 2021, Brickley testified before the House Committee on Natural Resources regarding H.R. 2278. The House unanimously passed the bill on July 29, 2021, with a 423-0 vote. The Senate passed it unanimously on October 1, 2021.

On October 14, 2021, President Biden signed H.R. 2278 in the Oval Office, officially designating the September 11th National Memorial Trail.

In March 2022, the Pennsylvania Department of Conservation and Natural Resources designated the Pennsylvania portion of the trail as a Statewide Major Greenway.

In June 2022, the first 9/11 National Memorial Trail Tour commenced—a 27-day, 1,200-mile ride with over 20 cyclists, becoming the largest group to ever ride the entirety of the alignment.

== Route ==
The trail forms a triangular route connecting the three memorial sites. At its inception, approximately 55% of the route followed existing off-road trails with 45% on existing roadways. The route is divided into three legs:

=== Western Leg: Pentagon to Flight 93 ===
Approximately 380 miles (610 km) from Arlington, Virginia to Shanksville, Pennsylvania:

Trail	Location	Length	Surface
Mount Vernon Trail	Virginia	18 miles (29 km)	Paved
C&O Canal Towpath	DC, Maryland	184.5 miles (296.9 km)	Crushed stone
Great Allegheny Passage	Maryland, Pennsylvania	150 miles (240 km)	Crushed stone
September 11th NMT (purpose-built)	Pennsylvania	1.5 miles (2.4 km)	Paved

=== Northern Leg: Flight 93 to National September 11 Memorial ===
Approximately 400 miles (640 km) from Shanksville, Pennsylvania to New York City:

Trail	Location	Length
Lehigh Gorge Trail	Pennsylvania	26 miles (42 km)
D&L Trail	Pennsylvania	165 miles (266 km)
Sussex Branch Trail	New Jersey	20 miles (32 km)
Paulinskill Valley Trail	New Jersey	27 miles (43 km)
Patriots' Path	New Jersey	30 miles (48 km)
Lenape Trail	New Jersey	34 miles (55 km)
Hudson River Waterfront Walkway	New Jersey	18.5 miles (29.8 km)
Hudson River Greenway	New York	11 miles (18 km)

=== Eastern Leg: National September 11 Memorial to Pentagon ===
Approximately 320 miles (510 km) from New York City to Arlington, Virginia via the East Coast Greenway:

Trail	Location	Length
Newark Riverfront Park	New Jersey	1.4 miles (2.3 km)
Weequahic Park	New Jersey	
Rahway River Parkway	New Jersey	4 miles (6.4 km)
Middlesex Greenway	New Jersey	3.5 miles (5.6 km)
D&R Canal Trail	New Jersey	70 miles (110 km)
Delaware Canal State Park Trail	Pennsylvania	60 miles (97 km)
US 202 Parkway Trail	Pennsylvania	4 miles (6.4 km)
Schuylkill River Trail	Pennsylvania	130 miles (210 km)
Northern Delaware Greenway	Delaware	10 miles (16 km)
Jack A. Markell Trail	Delaware	5.5 miles (8.9 km)
Battery Park Trail	Delaware	2 miles (3.2 km)
James F. Hall Trail	Delaware	4 miles (6.4 km)
Torrey C. Brown Rail Trail	Maryland	20 miles (32 km)
Jones Falls Trail	Maryland	10 miles (16 km)
Gwynns Falls Trail	Maryland	15 miles (24 km)
BWI Trail	Maryland	12.5 miles (20.1 km)
Baltimore and Annapolis Trail	Maryland	13.3 miles (21.4 km)
Washington, Baltimore and Annapolis Trail	Maryland	4 miles (6.4 km)
Anacostia Riverwalk Trail	DC	20 miles (32 km)

== State 9/11 Memorials ==
The trail passes three official state September 11 memorials:

- Empty Sky – The official New Jersey September 11 memorial in Jersey City
- Garden of Reflection – The official Pennsylvania September 11 memorial in Lower Makefield Township
- 9/11 Memorial of Maryland – At the Baltimore World Trade Center

== Points of Interest ==
In addition to the three national memorials, the trail passes numerous historic sites and National Park Service units:

=== National Park Service Sites ===
- Chesapeake and Ohio Canal National Historical Park
- Allegheny Portage Railroad National Historic Site
- Johnstown Flood National Memorial
- Gettysburg National Military Park
- Antietam National Battlefield
- Harpers Ferry National Historical Park
- Delaware Water Gap National Recreation Area
- Morristown National Historical Park

=== State and Local Parks ===
- Valley Forge National Historical Park
- Ohiopyle State Park
- Lehigh Gorge State Park
- Liberty State Park
- Delaware Canal State Park

== Planning and navigation ==
The trail offers an interactive map on its official website allowing visitors to:

- Plan routes between points
- Identify off-road vs. on-road sections
- Locate camping and services
- Find nearby 9/11 memorials and museums

=== Signage and wayfinding ===
Trail route marker

The trail is marked with distinctive green, blue, and white shields featuring "9-11 NMT" signage. In September 2025, the Shapiro Administration announced that Pennsylvania's Department of Transportation (PennDOT) and Department of Conservation and Natural Resources (DCNR) were working to install nearly 750 wayfinding signs across 25 counties and 129 municipalities, with a goal to complete signage before the 25th anniversary of 9/11 in 2026.

== Events ==
The September 11th National Memorial Trail Alliance organizes annual events including:

- Tour de Trail: Flight 93 – A bike ride from Berlin, PA to the Flight 93 National Memorial
- Tour de Trail: Pentagon – A walk/bike event to the Pentagon Memorial
- Gettysburg Loop Tour – A multi-day cycling tour through south-central Pennsylvania

== Organization ==
The trail is managed by the September 11th National Memorial Trail Alliance, a 501(c)(3) nonprofit organization headquartered in New Eagle, Pennsylvania. The Alliance was granted federal tax-exempt status by the IRS in January 2011.

The organization works with local, state, and federal governments, as well as partner trail organizations, to develop and maintain the trail network. It is governed by a board of directors that includes trail professionals, government representatives, and family members of those who perished on September 11, 2001.

== See also ==
- List of long-distance trails in the United States
- Memorials and services for the September 11 attacks
- National Trails System
- East Coast Greenway
- Great Allegheny Passage
