= List of mountain biking areas and trails in Pennsylvania =

This is a partial list of mountain biking areas and trails in Pennsylvania.

== Mountain biking areas ==
- Allegrippis Trails
- Blue Marsh
- Dick and Nancy Eales Preserve at Moosic Mountain, 14.5 miles (23.3 km) of trails
- Galbraith Gap
- Hopewell Park
- Hubbard Mountain
- Lackawanna State Park, 15 miles (24 km) of trails
- Marsh Creek Park
- Merli-Sarnoski Park, 15 miles (24 km) of trails
- Michaux State Forest
- Moon Lake State Forest Recreation Area
- Moraine State Park
- Nockamixon State Park
- North Park
- Prompton State Park
- Swatara State Park
- Trexler Nature Preserve, 18 miles (29 km) of trails
- Wissahickon Valley Park
- Yellow Creek State Park

== Lift-serviced bike parks ==
Lift-serviced bike parks are downhill mountain biking trails—typically open seasonally at ski resorts. Riders are ferried to the top of a mountain by a ski lift. They ride downhill mountain bikes, and usually wear protective armor and a full-facemask bicycle helmet.

=== List of lift-serviced bike parks ===
- Blue Mountain Downhill Bike Park (21 trails)
- Launch Bike Park
- Seven Springs Downhill Bike Park

== Rail trails, rails-with-trails, canal towpaths ==
These types of trails typically feature relatively smooth trail surfaces of crushed rock, dirt, or pavement. They are wide with a gentle grade.

=== List of trails ===
- D&L Trail
  - Black Diamond Trail
  - Lehigh Gorge Trail
  - Delaware Canal Towpath
- Great Allegheny Passage
- Lackawanna Heritage Valley Trail
- Pine Creek Rail Trail
- Susquehanna Warrior Trail
