= Turn Hole Tunnel =

Turnhole Tunnel
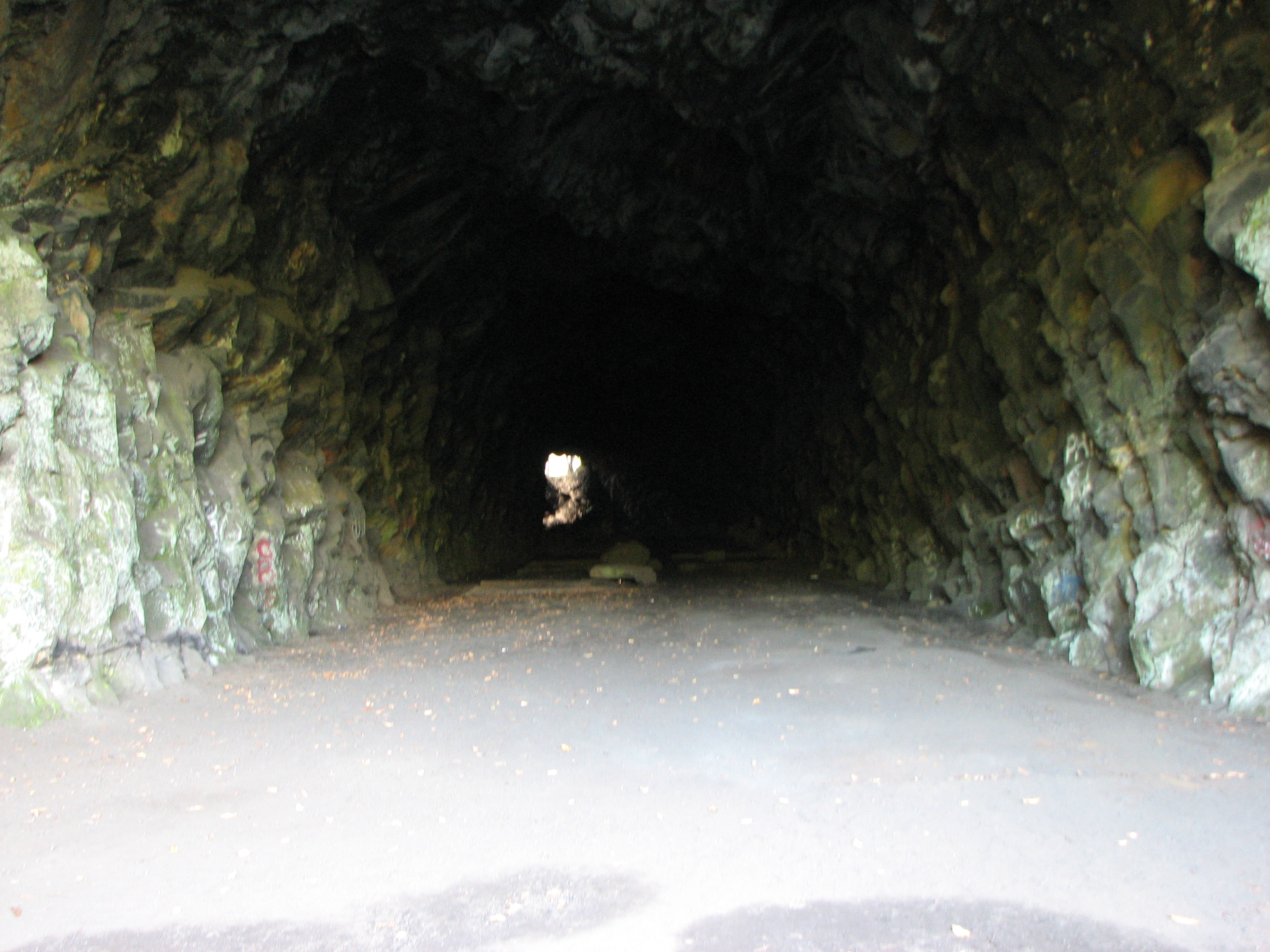
- Looking back through the tunnel from the edge of the Lehigh River. Ties from both tracks can be seen, strewn with rockfall from the ceiling.
- Interactive map of Turnhole Tunnel

Overview
- Line: Main Line
- Location: Carbon County, Pennsylvania, USA
- Coordinates: 40°52′57.9″N 75°45′40.3″W
- Status: rails removed; closed to hikers
- System: Central Railroad of New Jersey

Operation
- Opened: 1866
- Closed: 1956
- Owner: Lehigh Gorge State Park

Technical
- Track length: 496 feet (151 m)
- No. of tracks: Double
- Track gauge: 1,435 mm (4 ft 8 1/2 in)

The Turn Hole Tunnel is an abandoned railroad tunnel near Jim Thorpe, Pennsylvania. Built by the Lehigh Coal and Navigation Company, it carried part of the Lehigh and Susquehanna RR main line until 1912, and was used as part of a passing siding for several decades thereafter. It is now an attraction in Lehigh Gorge State Park.

== History ==
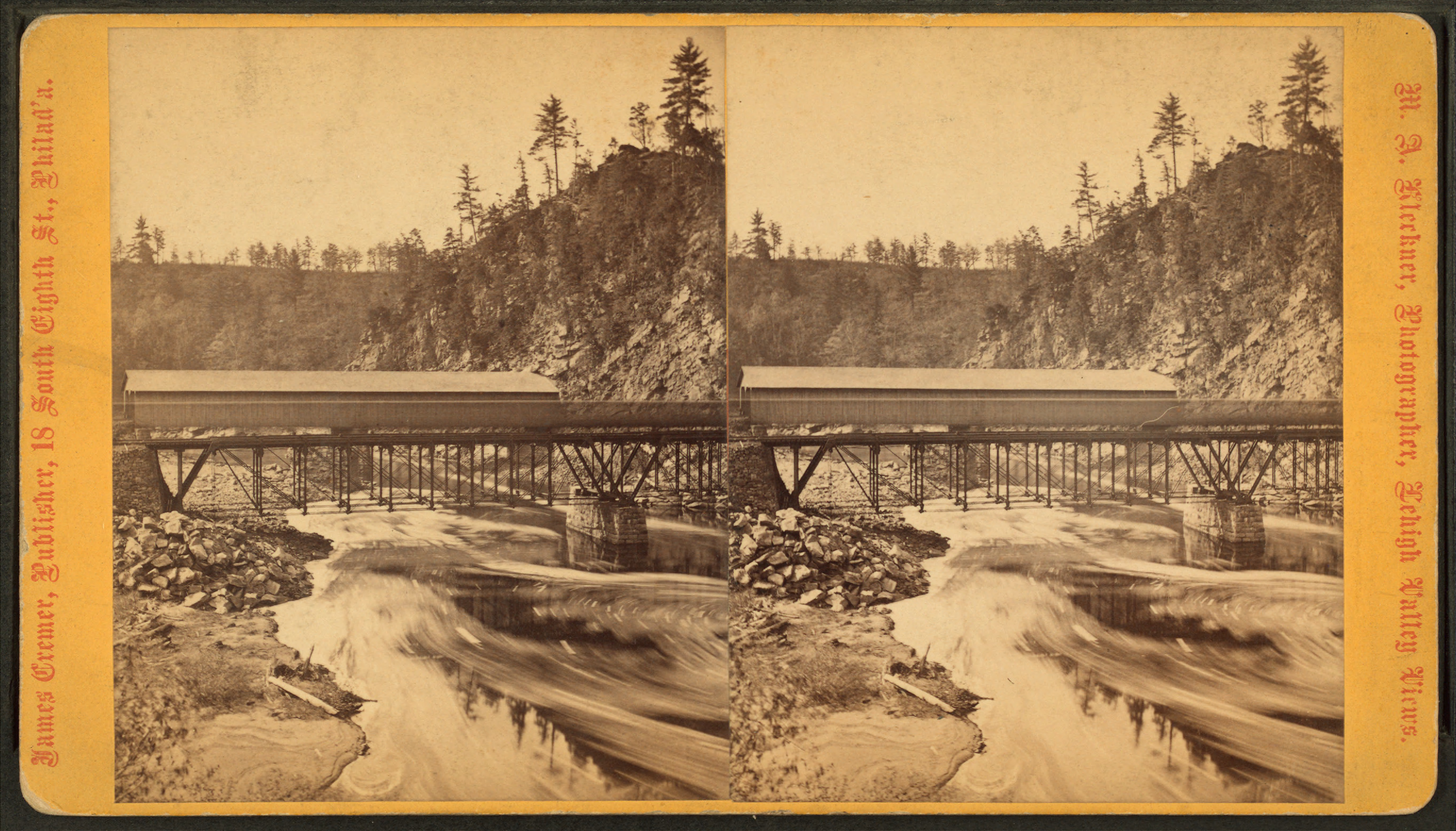
Original bridge at Turn Hole (stereoscopic image). Tunnel is just out of sight to the right.

The tunnel takes its name from the "Turn Hole" in the Lehigh River, a deep eddy where the river makes a turn at the base of a high cliff, known as Moyer's Rock. When the Lehigh and Susquehanna Railroad (a subsidiary of the Lehigh Coal and Navigation Company) extended its line from White Haven to Mauch Chunk (now Jim Thorpe) in 1866, it crossed the Lehigh River at the Turn Hole and tunneled 496 feet (151 m) through the face of the cliff, proceeding southward through the gorge. The parallel line of the Lehigh Valley Railroad crossed the river just to the west, but swung around the point of Moyer's Rock instead of tunneling. The Lehigh and Susquehanna was leased to the Central Railroad of New Jersey in 1871.

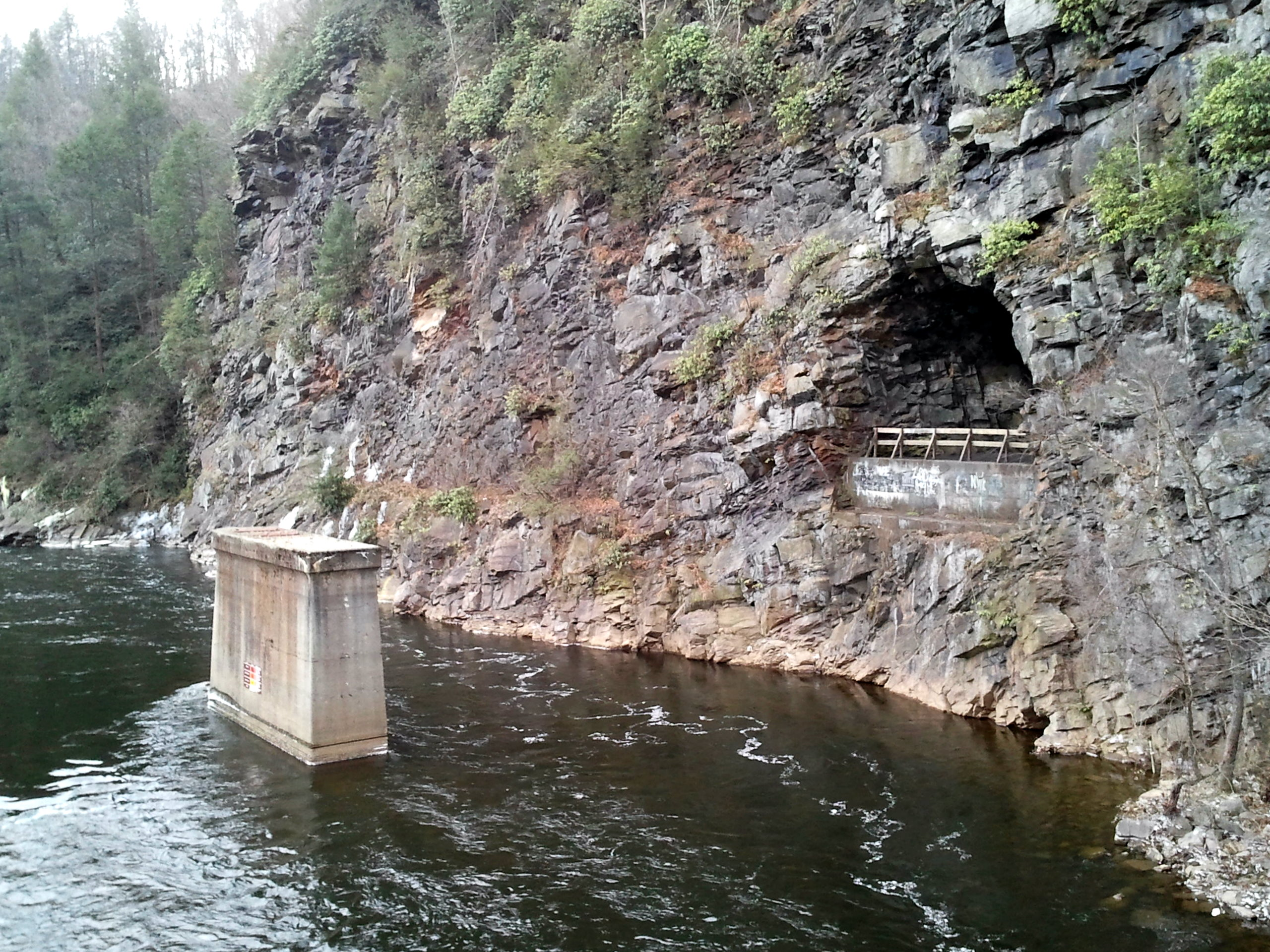
The Turn Hole Tunnel in 2010. Notice the pier still standing in the river.

The tunnel carried two tracks of the CNJ main line until about 1910, when it was condemned. The railroad began contracting to bypass it in 1911, grading a new alignment parallel with the Lehigh Valley. The new alignment was opened in 1912, but the two tracks in the tunnel and over the old bridge were kept intact as a passing siding until 1956, when they were abandoned.

The CNJ main line through Lehigh Gorge was abandoned in late 1965. While most of it has become the Lehigh Gorge Trail, the new alignment around Turn Hole Tunnel was paved as an access road to the Glen Onoko trail head of Lehigh Gorge State Park. The tunnel remains largely intact, with ties from the double track remaining in situ, occasionally covered by rockfall. At the north portal, overlooking the river, a safety railing has been built across the tunnel. The piers of the old bridge still stand in the river.
