= Moon Lake State Forest Recreation Area =

Recreation area in Plymouth Township, Pennsylvania, U.S.

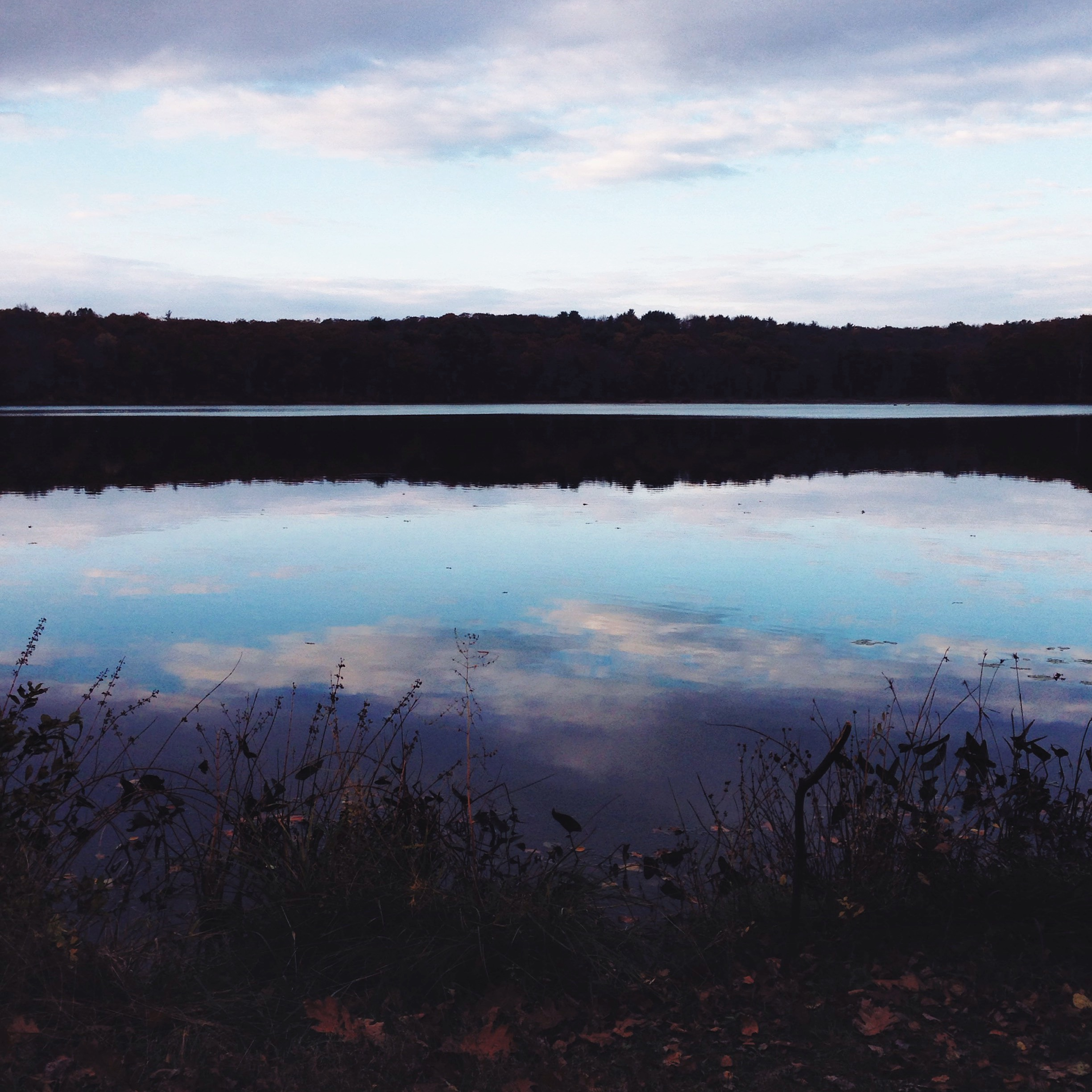
- Moon Lake

- Location within Pennsylvania
- Location: Plymouth, Luzerne, Pennsylvania, United States
- Coordinates: 41°15′12″N 76°02′52″W
- Area: 942 acres (381 ha)
- Established: 1968; 58 years ago
- Named for: Moon Lake
- Governing body: Pennsylvania Department of Conservation and Natural Resources

Moon Lake State Forest Recreation Area is a 942-acre (381 ha), recreation area within Pinchot State Forest in Plymouth Township, Luzerne County, Pennsylvania. It is open for mountain biking, hiking, fishing, bird watching, and nature study. The recreation area consists of open fields and woodlots surrounding Moon Lake, a 48-acre (19 ha), spring-fed lake. Moon Lake SFRA is in the Delaware and Lehigh National Heritage Corridor. It is located near Pennsylvania Route 29 on the western edge of the Scranton—Wilkes-Barre—Hazleton metropolitan statistical area.

For the Moon Lake located in Schuylkill County, Pennsylvania, see Beurys Lake.

== Geography ==
=== Hydrology ===
The primary hydrological feature at Moon Lake Recreation Area is Moon Lake—a 48-acre (19 ha), spring-fed lake. The lake is located centrally in the park. Moon Lake resides in the Susquehanna River Basin—a Warm Water Fishery. It is a passageway for migrating fish. Specifically, Moon Lake is in the Hunlock Creek watershed—a Cold Water Fishery. The watershed of the lake covers 0.5 square miles (130 ha). Forested land serves as a riparian buffer from development around the lake. Throughout the park are many wetlands, spring seeps, vernal ponds, and small streams. The hydrological connection between Moon Lake and the Susquehanna River is as follows. Moon Lake empties into Tributary 28303, which empties into Tributary 28301, which merges into Hunlock Creek, and finally flows directly into the Susquehanna River. From there, water reaches the Chesapeake Bay and Atlantic Ocean.

== Biology ==
=== Flora ===
Moon Lake Recreation Area has diverse habitats from upland forests to low-lying wetlands near the lake. The upland forests are part of the Appalachian-Blue Ridge forest ecoregion. Tree species include hickories, red maple, and tuliptree (Liriodendron tulipifera). On the lower slopes, red and white oaks are present. On the drier ridge tops and upper slopes, chestnut and both black and white oaks dominate. Conifer cover, including white pine (Pinus strobus) and eastern hemlock (Tsuga canadensis), is present throughout the park. The dense understory is various shrubs—particularly mountain laurel (Kalmia latifolia) and blackberry. Other understory species are present including hay-scented and New York ferns, striped maple, spicebush, black birch, and hornbeam.

A wetland system adjoins the northeast corner of the lake. It is of the type: Palustrine scrub-shrub broadleaf /emergent (Phragmites australis). It is seasonally flooded or saturated. Four wetlands are listed on the National Wetlands Inventory map.

=== Fauna ===
Wild turkey, grey squirrel, woodchuck, cottontail rabbit, Canada goose, mallard duck, black duck, American woodcock (Scolopax minor), ruffed grouse, chipmunk, raccoon, white-tailed deer (Odocoileus virginianus) and various songbirds populate the park. Also found were opossum, raccoon, mink, muskrat, coyote, fox, porcupine, and American black bear (Ursus americanus). Copperhead snakes (Agkistrodon contortrix) are also present in the park. There are no threatened or endangered species in the park.

== Recreation ==
=== Mountain bike trail system ===
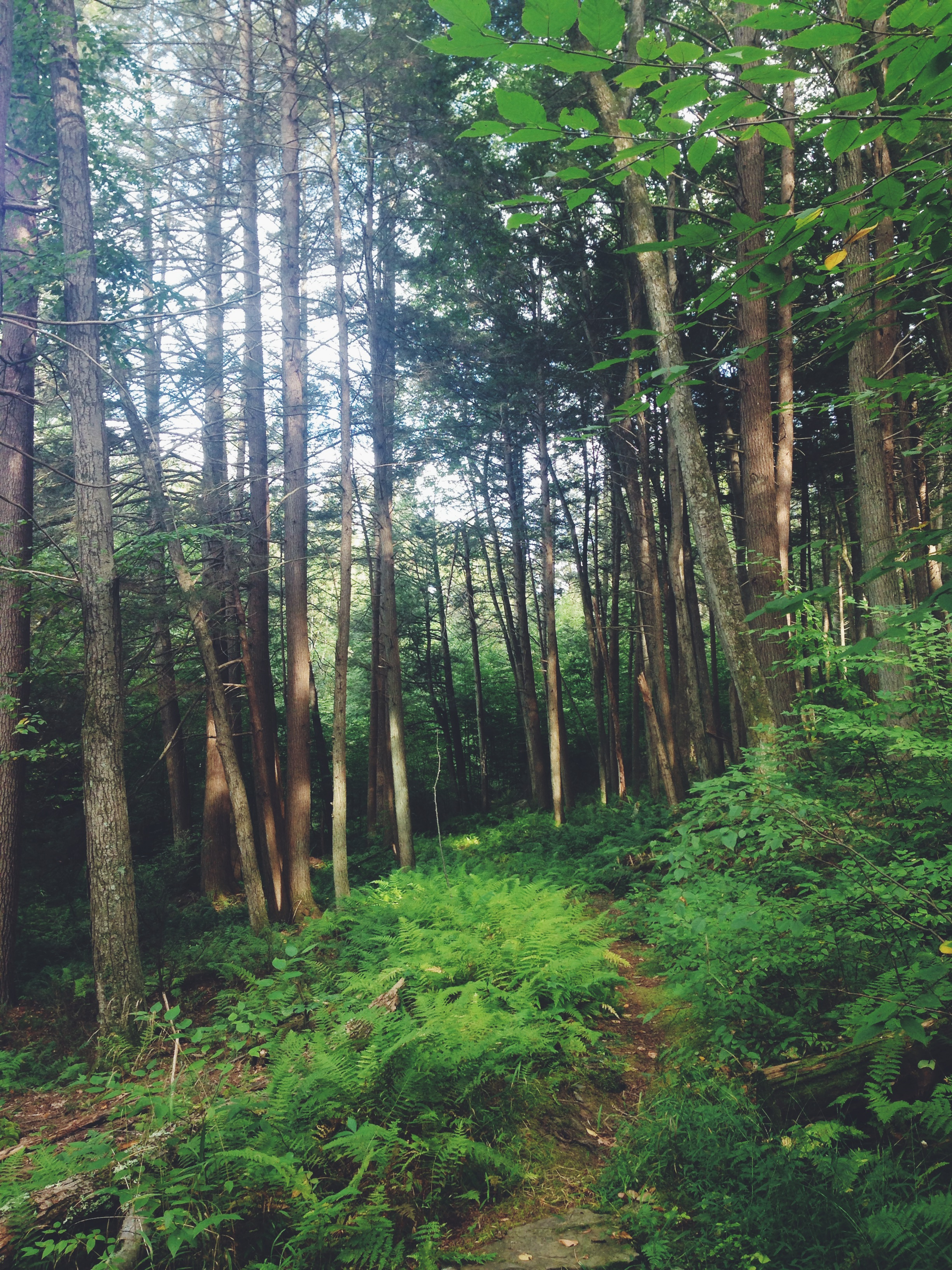
Old-growth forest near Flume Trail, Moon Lake Park

Approximately 30 miles (48 km) of purpose-built mountain bike trails also provide opportunities for hiking, cross-country skiing, orienteering, and nature watching along a stacked-loop trail system. Trails range from wide and smooth to narrow, rocky and technical singletrack. There many optional rock overs with go arounds. The park features Deacon Trials Area, a mountain bike trials and skills area. The main trailhead is located at the front entrance to the park on Atherton Rd, off State Route 29. ATVs, snowmobiles, and motorboats are prohibited. The trail network is maintained by volunteer groups. It is open year-round.

=== Fishing ===
Fishing is common and permitted on Moon Lake. Moon Lake is stocked yearly with thousands of trout by the Pennsylvania Fish and Boat Commission. In the winter, ice fishing on the lake is popular.

=== Model Airplane Airfield ===
Radio-controlled flying is an activity at the park. A private sporting club, the Wyoming Valley RC Flyers, leases a southern section of the park at the Model Airplane Airfield. The club flies radio-controlled aircraft on an estimated 200 acres (81 ha) of open meadows. The airfield includes a pavilion, landing strip, fence separating spectator areas from airfield-operation areas, picnic tables, and a gravel access road.

== History ==
Throughout its history, Moon Lake has supported both passive and active recreational opportunities for the general public. Passive uses had included hiking, fishing, bird watching, and nature study. These activities were generally separated from the active and developed areas of the park. Active uses had included boating, picnicking, camping, swimming, disc golf, baseball, softball, tennis, and soccer. At its peak, Moon Lake Park had attracted 150,000 visitors annually.

=== Opening ===
Moon Lake Park was established as part of the Luzerne County Park System in 1968. Luzerne County officials had intended to provide residents with open space for recreation. That year, federal and state funds had become available through the Project 70 Land Acquisition and Borrowing Act. These funds allowed Luzerne County to purchase 650 acres (260 ha), including Moon Lake itself.

A swimming pool was built in 1968 as part of the original infrastructure of the park. It is an L-shaped, Olympic-sized pool. The pool included an asphalt parking lot, concrete sidewalks, bathhouse, pool and deck, lawn areas of suntanning, patios, a concession area, and stone landscape walls. During a heatwave in the summer of 1993, 10,000 swimmers visited the swimming pool in a single month.

Athletic fields were built in the west central section of the park near Deerwood Drive. These fields included a softball and multi-use field. Game courts were also built. The game courts include 3 tennis courts and 1 basketball court. The surface is bituminous paving topped with colored sealer. Also built as part of the original construction of the park was a marina. The marina is located along the eastern shore of Moon Lake. It included a marina building, bulkhead, and floating docks. The marina building contained restrooms and a concession for boat rentals.

A campground was located in the eastern section of the park elevated approximately 140 feet (43 m) above Moon Lake. The campground contained individual sites and tent/trailer sites. Some sites had been equipped with electric service. Others could accommodate larger RVs. Later, a Nature Education Center was built. The center is located in the southern section of the park along a ridge elevated 100 feet (30 m) above Moon Lake. In addition to the main building, there are two outdoor group meeting shelters and a large group picnic pavilion. Paved handicap parking spaces are available.

In 1994, two women were struck and killed by a single lightning strike at Moon Lake Park. The women were killed when lightning struck a wooden pavilion under which they had taken shelter.

=== Expansion and partial closure ===
Since the early 2000s, 749 acres (303 ha) have been added to the park—more than doubling-in-size to 1,399 acres (566 ha). However, the addition is for administrative purposes. Official park boundaries remain at 650 acres (260 ha). Other improvements were made possible by a 2005 grant from the Pennsylvania Department of Conservation and Natural Resources. Additional picnic pavilions and picnic tables were built. A roll-in aluminum dock system was installed on Moon Lake.

Later, in 2008, an extensive network of mountain biking trails was built. Trail building was a cooperative effort with Moon Lake Park staff and local groups of mountain bikers. This public-private partnership greatly expanded the trail network. The trails are among the primary uses of the park today.

Luzerne County began to cut funding for the park in the late 2000s. In 2007, Luzerne County budgeted $575,000 for Moon Lake Park. By 2011, funding had dwindled to $119,626. The swimming pool, public restrooms, and Nature Education Center closed in 2009. Campgrounds closed in 2010. Much of the existing infrastructure had deteriorated from vandalism and lack of maintenance. At the time, Moon Lake Park remained open for passive activities like mountain biking, hiking, and fishing.

=== Renaming ===
On December 22, 2014, the Luzerne County Council voted to transfer ownership of the park to the Commonwealth of Pennsylvania. Council also transferred Seven Tubs Natural Area and a 400 acres (160 ha) parcel adjacent to Moon Lake Park. Council said that "[PA DCNR] will do a better job managing the county sites for recreation. On June 30, 2015, Governor Wolf signed Senate Bill 699 transferring ownership of Moon Lake County Park to the Commonwealth under the administration of the Pennsylvania Department of Conservation and Natural Resources (DCNR.) DCNR plans to continue to permit mountain biking, hiking, and fishing; but remove permanent structures like the swimming pool and front office. Further plans may include building a connecting trail from Moon Lake Park to the Susquehanna River. " Under the plan, Luzerne County received a few thousand dollars in lieu of taxes. Luzerne County also keeps mineral rights for 25 years. On October 26, 2015, Luzerne County finalized the transfer of Moon Lake Park to the Commonwealth of Pennsylvania. In 2015, the park was renamed Moon Lake State Forest Recreation Area and is included in the Pinchot State Forest system. Most of the existing structures will be demolished.

== Nearby attractions ==
=== Parks ===
- Ricketts Glen State Park
- Frances Slocum State Park
- Nescopeck State Park
- Susquehanna Warrior Trail
- Pinchot State Forest

=== Mountain bike trail systems ===
- Lackawanna State Park
- Dick and Nancy Eales Preserve at Moosic Mountain
- Merli-Sarnoski County Park
