= National Canal Museum =

Coordinates: 40.66224°N 75.23900°W

- Established: 1970
- Location: Easton, Pennsylvania
- Type: History museum
- Accreditation: American Alliance of Museums
- Owner: Delaware and Lehigh National Heritage Corridor

The National Canal Museum, officially the Hugh Moore Historical Park & Museums, is a museum in Easton, Pennsylvania, and part of the Delaware and Lehigh National Heritage Corridor.

After a three-year transition during which the Delaware & Lehigh National Heritage Corridor operated the canal museum under a management agreement, the two merged. The D&L is now responsible for the National Canal Museum, Hugh Moore Park, the Emrick Technology Center, the Locktender's House Museum and the canal boat, Josiah White II.

Officially known as Hugh Moore Historical Park & Museums, the National Canal Museum is located in Easton's Hugh Moore Park.

== History ==
The National Canal Museum opened in 1970 as a joint cooperative effort between the City of Easton's Hugh Moore Park Commission and the Pennsylvania Canal Society. Sitting at the fork between the Delaware and Lehigh Rivers, the museum was intended to highlight and operate within Hugh Moore Park.

The Josiah White, a functioning replica canal boat, debuted in 1978. Canal boat rides became a significant attraction for museum and park visitors.

In 1982, the museum's exhibits were redesigned. New exhibits highlighted the broader history of the towpath canal era and the industrial heritage of the Lehigh Valley.

During this period, the National Canal Museum began hosting several major events, including the annual Canal Festival and annual Canal History and Technology Symposium, the latter being held at Lafayette College. By 1985, the museum was realizing the ability for a complete collection and archival ability of important artifacts of both the canal era and the Industrial Revolution.

In 1996, the National Canal Museum moved to Two Rivers Landing in an effort to revitalize Easton’s downtown district. Today, Two Rivers Landing receives an average of 250,000 visitors each year. Beginning in 2002, the museum began a campaign to add hands-on activities to the existing exhibits. A proposal to the National Science Foundation(NSF) resulted in a grant of $1.4 million, later increased to $2 million, for the creation of exhibits based on the “science and technology of canals and inland waterways."

A new exhibit space was installed in March 2006, focusing on the history, science, and technology of canal construction and navigation.

In 2011, the museum’s 15-year lease period in Two Rivers Landing ended and was not renewed. On January 1, 2012, the museum was relocated, returning to Hugh Moore Park. The Emrick Technology Center was repurposed to act as the main exhibit and administrative space during the Crayola Factory shutdown.

In 2013, the Delaware & Lehigh National Heritage Corridor began operating the National Canal Museum under a management agreement during the first Crayola Experience opening. This marked the beginning of a three-year transition in which the two organizations would merge. The transition allowed the D&L to integrate the management, finance, marketing, and development functions of the two organizations. The transition period ended in 2017. The museum, along with the other operations of Hugh Moore Historical Park & Museums, is now the Signature Program of the D&L.

== Collections ==
The museum's collections reflect the material culture and document the history of America's canals and navigable rivers, as well as canal-related industries in the Lehigh Valley. The museum's holdings include 3,753 artifacts; 3,890 reels of film, video cassettes and oral history audio tapes; 52,782 slides, photographs and negative images; 31,824 engineering drawings; a library of more than 13,483 volumes; 736 linear feet of manuscript materials; and 261 rolls of microfilm. Among the museum's archival holdings are rare film footage of canal life, historic photographs, canal maps, captain's logs, a complete set of the Army Corps of Engineers' annual reports to Congress, and engineering plans for 15 towpath canals east of the Mississippi River.

The museum is responsible for maintaining and interpreting the historic structures and sites within the 260 acres that comprise Hugh Moore Park, a National Register Historic District. These include Section 8 of the Lehigh Canal and its three operating locks, a locktender's house, ruins from three 19th-century industrial areas, and the remains of the Change Bridge, one of the first iron cable suspension bridges constructed in America.

== Accreditations and affiliations ==
The National Canal Museum is accredited by American Alliance of Museums and is an affiliate of the Smithsonian Institution.

== Hugh Moore Park ==
Hugh Moore Park is a City of Easton park between the Lehigh River and the Lehigh Canal. It covers 520 acres (2.1 km^{2}), including part of the Lehigh River and section 8 of the Lehigh Canal. The area now known as Hugh Moore Park was originally an industrial park, built due to the large amount of anthracite coal being brought down the Lehigh Canal from present day Jim Thorpe, Pennsylvania

The park was purchased by the City of Easton in 1962, using money donated by Hugh Moore. This led to the formation of the Pennsylvania Canal Society in 1966 and the eventual creation of the National Canal Museum. Improvements to the park and its facilities have continually enhanced its visitor experience. These improvements include a biking and hiking trail, a boat launch, and pavilions. Additionally, the park has aided in the preservation of industrial ruins, including three locks, one of which is the only functioning lift lock in Pennsylvania and New Jersey.

The Delaware & Lehigh National Heritage Corridor, which has merged with The National Canal Museum, is responsible for maintaining and interpreting the historic structures and sites within the 260 acres (1.1 km^{2}) that comprise Hugh Moore Park, a National Register Historic District. These include Section 8 of the Lehigh Canal and its three operating locks, a locktender's house, ruins from three 19th-century industrial areas, and the Change Bridge, one of the first iron cable suspension bridges constructed in America.

=== The Emrick Center ===
The Elaine and Peter Emrick Technology Center is a 14,000-square-foot (1,300 m^{2}), two-story brick building constructed to resemble a factory, the likes of which would have been seen throughout the park in the industrial era. The building holds a reception area, exhibit spaces, offices, and the Hugh Moore Park and Museums Archives.

The building opened in 2007. The inaugural exhibit, "From this Valley: Iron, Steel and the Birthplace of the American Industrial Revolution," tells the story of the Lehigh Valley's critical role in the Industrial Revolution. In 2012, the National Canal Museum relocated from Two Rivers Landing to the Emrick Center, and transferred most of the exhibits and hands-on educational activity stations there. The relocated Museum, which is adjacent to the mule-drawn canal boat, the Josiah White II, opened on Memorial Day weekend, 2012. It came under operation of the Delaware & Lehigh National Heritage Corridor in 2013, completing its merger in 2017.

==== Archives ====
Also currently held in the Emrick Technology Center is the archives of the National Canal Museum. Since the inception of the institution and through all of its incarnations, and beginning with the first master plan, there have been provisions for the National Canal Museum to preserve the transportation and industrial history of the area. Since the acquisition of property for this purpose in 1985, the collection has undergone rapid growth, and is now the premier site for information concerning the technology of the Lehigh Valley and canal transportation in America.

The museum's collection reflects these areas, and document the history of America's canals and navigable rives, as well as the related industries in the Lehigh Valley. According to the museum website:

"The museum's holdings include: 3,753 artifacts; 3,890 reels of film, video cassettes [sic.], and audio (oral history) tapes; 52,782 slides, photographs and negative images; 31,824 engineering drawings; a library of more than 13,483 volumes; 736 linear feet of manuscript materials; and 261 rolls of microfilm."

In addition to a large amount of historical artifacts and data, the museum also employs an in-house historian, available for lectures, researchers, and inquiries.

=== Locktender's House ===
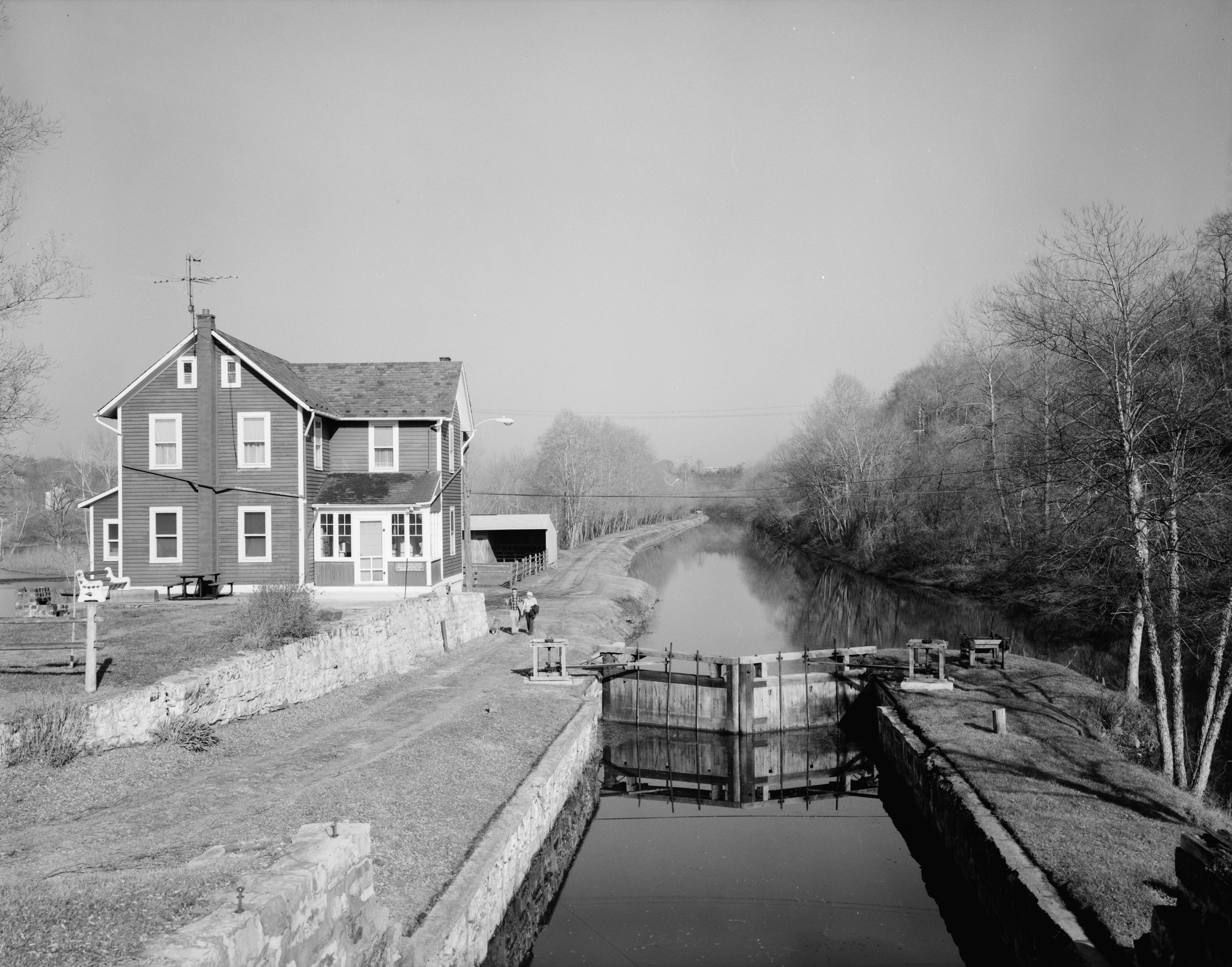
Locktender's House and Guard Lock 8

The Locktender's House is a restored locktender's house nestled between the Lehigh River and Guard Lock 8 on the Lehigh Canal. A museum is located on its first floor. The Locktender's House displays the living and working conditions of people in the 19th and early 20th centuries.

The Locktender's House was built for the person with the responsibility of operating the lock. In order to ensure that lock was operated, the house was constructed as near to the lock as possible, so there was no reason for someone in the house to be unable to come out and operate the lock.

Opened in 1974, the museum is meant to provide a rough equivalent of what working on the canal would entail. Costumed guides provide background and information during a tour of the rooms of the house.

=== Josiah White II ===
The Josiah White II, the current boat used for the canal boat ride, is a steel-hulled boat built in 1993 by Bethlehem Steel at its former Sparrows Point Shipyard in Sparrow's Point, Maryland.

The original canal boat, named the Josiah White, served operationally during the summer from 1978 until 1993, when it was allowed to sink near the feeder gate for the canal. It currently serves as a visual aid for the canal boat ride.

The canal boat ride was developed to provide visitors with context and historical information, including information about building, living, and working on the canal. Pulled by two mules, named Hank and George, the ride intends to recreate the experience of moving down the canal during its operational period. Average rides are 40 minutes long, and discuss a multitude of topics, including mules, mule tending, and the history of the canal.

== Timeline ==
- 1962: The City of Easton Purchases Hugh Moore Park using money donated by Hugh Moore.
- 1963: The City of Easton enters an agreement with the Joint Planning Commission of Lehigh and Northampton counties to prepare a preliminary report on the park. As an outgrowth of this study, riding stables were established through a private concessionaire in the park.
- 1965: Ordinance No. 1877. City of Easton annexes Hugh Moore Park.
- 1966:
  - Pennsylvania Canal Society formed.
  - Initial Master Plan Prepared. The thrust of this master plan was to preserve the 260 acres (1.1 km^{2}) of park lands along the lower 6 miles (9.7 km) of the Lehigh River. Also to preserve its transportation and industrial history.
- 1967: Ordinance No. 1966. City of Easton sets up the Hugh Moore Park Commission.
- 1969: Utilizing the first master plan, grants were obtained from Project 500 of the State of Pennsylvania, Federal Land and Ware Conservation Funds, and private donations to start the initial restoration and development within the Hugh Moore park.
- 1970: The Canal Museum at the Forks of the Delaware opens as a joint cooperative effort between the City of Easton's Hugh Moore Park Commission and the Pennsylvania Canal Society.
- 1973: A second master plan is developed. It primarily deals with land use and protection of the river corridor by surrounding municipalities.
- 1974: The Locktender's House Museum opens. Monies for exterior and interior restoration came from the initial development grants for the park. The interior exhibits were researched and laid out by the Junior League of the Lehigh Valley
- 1975–1976: The Hugh Moore Park Charitable Trust is formed with assets from the estate of Hugh Moore. The income from the trust is designated for the operation and development of the Hugh Moore Park.
- 1976:
  - Section 8 of the Lehigh Canal opens after a three-year restoration effort.
  - The Friends of the Hugh Moore Park are formed as a non-profit corporation to assist in the development of Hugh Moore Park.
- 1978: The canal boat, Josiah White, Purchased by the Friends of Hugh Moore Park, is put into operation.
- 1979: The first annual Canal Festival is held.
- 1982: The Canal Museum's exhibits are redesigned to make the museum a national museum of the towpath canal era. This redesign also acts as a catalyst for the beginnings of the interpretation of our industrial heritage.
- 1982–1988: Playgrounds, bike paths, improved roads, a water line to the Locktender's House and many other projects are completed utilizing state grants, community development block grants, and private contributions.
- 1983: The reorganization of the Friends of Hugh Moore Park to take on the function of serving as a museum board in place of the joint agreement with the City and Pennsylvania Canal Society begins.
- 1984: The Articles of Incorporation and Bylaws of the Friends of Hugh Moore Park are amended to restructure the organization and rename it as the Hugh Moore Historical Park and Museums, Inc.
- 1985: The City of Easton sells the Hugh Moore Historical Park and Museums the property for a collection and archival storage facility.
- 1985–1988: The Hugh Moore Historical Park and Museums begins a systematic expansion of its collection reflecting the wider scope of activities relation to canals and industries within the region.
- 1986: Changing exhibits are instituted at the Canal Museum to explore various aspects of industrial history that cannot be adequately covered by permanent exhibits.
- 1988: The U.S. Congress passes and President Reagan signs a bill creating the Delaware and Lehigh National Heritage Corridor.
- 1990: Huch Moore Historical Park and Museums signs an agreement with the City of Easton to assume management of programs and facilities
- 1992: Accreditation approved by AAM (American Alliance of Museums)
- 1994: Josiah White II put into use. The new boat has two decks to allow more passengers and catered meals to be served on board.
- 1996: A new National Canal Museum Opens in downtown Easton. Included in the new building is the Delaware & Lehigh National Heritage corridor Visitor Center and The Crayola FACTORY.
- 1997: Canal Boat Store expanded.
- 2000
  - Capital Campaign begins to raise money for the Center for Canal History and Technology at Hugh Moore Park. This new facility will feature technology and science exhibits.
  - The first annual Immersion Days is held. This hands-on living history program is designed for students (grades 3–12).
- 2002: Hugh Moore Historical Park and Museums is awarded a planning grant from the National Endowment for the Humanities for a new multi-media program in the National Canal Museum.
- 2003: National Science Foundation awards National Canal Museum with a grant of $1.4 million (later awarded $200,000 supplemental grant) for development of new science and technology exhibits.
- 2006: New interactive NSF exhibits installed. New Exhibits convey fundamental concepts to illustrate how gravitational forces, simple mechanical tools, and the properties of water were manipulated by early engineers in order to build and efficient inland waterway transportation system.
- 2007: Emrick Technology Center Opens
- 2012: National Canal Museum relocates to Hugh Moore Park, leaving Two Rivers Landing
- 2013: A three-year transition begins, during which the Delaware & Lehigh National Heritage Corridor operates the National Canal Museum under a management agreement. The D&L begins to integrate the management, finance, marketing, and development functions of the two organizations during the Crayola Experience opening.
- 2017: National Canal Museum and Delaware & Lehigh National Heritage Corridor complete their merger. The D&L is the surviving entity under which the enterprises operate. The National Canal Museum begins functioning as a Signature Program of the D&L.

== See also ==
- Canal
- Delaware Canal
- Delaware and Lehigh National Heritage Corridor
- Lock (water transport)
- Lehigh Canal
- Canvass White
