= Project 70 Land Acquisition and Borrowing Act =

Project 70 Land Acquisition and Borrowing Act is a public lands acquisition law enacted in the Commonwealth of Pennsylvania on 22 June 1964. It permits the state to issue bonds for the purchase of lands for public parks, reservoirs, and other conservation, recreation, and historical preservation purposes, and to coordinate those purchases with local governments. The act also permits acquisition of lands by eminent domain. Once the lands are acquired under Project 70, the General Assembly must approve any disposition of these lands.

The park in northeastern Pennsylvania, ten miles north of Scranton, was known as Project 70 during its construction prior to opening under the name Lackawanna State Park.

== List of state parks ==
Below is a list of Pennsylvania state parks whose establishment or expansion was funded in part by Project 70 monies. The table includes the park name, if it was a new park or addition, the acres (hectares) acquired, the county or counties it is in, and the dates of the public hearing and approval by the governor.

Park	Type	Acres (Hectares)	County	Public Hearing Date	Governor Approval Date	Comments
Ohiopyle State Park	New park	18,328.343 acres (7,417.217 ha)	Fayette County	07-31-1964	08-08-1964	First and largest state park acquired under Project 70; the park opened in 1965 on a limited basis and was formally dedicated in 1971
Tyler State Park	New park	1,680.16 acres (679.94 ha)	Bucks County	09-25-1964	11-17-1964	The park was formally dedicated on May 25, 1974.
Codorus State Park	New Park	3,235.80 acres (1,309.48 ha)	York County	10-30-1964	12-10-1964	The park, which was originally named "Codorus Creek State Park", officially opened in 1970.
Nockamixon State Park	Addition	659.392 acres (266.846 ha)	Bucks County	04-23-1965	07-12-1965	
Valley Forge State Park	Addition	217.137 acres (87.872 ha)	Chester County	04-30-1965	07-12-1965	Given to the National Park Service for the United States Bicentennial in 1976; now Valley Forge National Historical Park
Ridley Creek State Park	New park	2,489.50 acres (1,007.46 ha)	Delaware County	05-14-1965	12-06-1965	
Locust Lake State Park	New park	1,143.51 acres (462.76 ha)	Schuylkill County	06-04-1965	09-01-1965	
Yellow Creek State Park	Addition	376.8 acres (152.5 ha)	Indiana County	08-13-1965	10-06-1965	
Moraine State Park	New park	1,091.60 acres (441.75 ha)	Butler County	12-02-1965	03-23-1966	
Moraine State Park	Addition	71.47 acres (28.92 ha)	Butler County	12-02-1965	03-23-1966	Old Stone House was added to the new park
Maurice K. Goddard State Park	New park	4,867.5 acres (1,969.8 ha)	Mercer County	12-03-1965	03-23-1966	Originally known as "Sandy Creek State Park", name was changed to honor Maurice K. Goddard
Pymatuning State Park	Addition	259.30 acres (104.93 ha)	Crawford County	12-04-1965	07-25-1966	
Little Buffalo State Park	New park	829.95 acres (335.87 ha)	Perry County	01-20-1966	03-23-1966	
Lackawanna State Park	New park	1,288.48 acres (521.43 ha)	Lackawanna County	01-28-1966	03-23-1966	
Scranton Iron Furnaces	New park	3.84 acres (1.55 ha)	Lackawanna County	01-28-1966	03-23-1966	Transferred in 1971 to the Pennsylvania Historical and Museum Commission
Marsh Creek State Park	New park	1,705.35 acres (690.13 ha)	Chester County	03-11-1966	06-07-1966	
Nolde Forest State Park	New park	665.82 acres (269.45 ha)	Berks County	07-15-1966	10-21-1966	Now Nolde Forest Environmental Education Center
Shikellamy State Park	Addition	46.52 acres (18.83 ha)	Northumberland County	08-26-1966	11-18-1966	This is the marina portion of the park
Canoe Creek State Park	New park	905.06 acres (366.26 ha)	Blair County	08-07-1966	01-16-1967	
Laurel Ridge State Park	New park	15,037.70 acres (6,085.54 ha)	Cambria, Fayette, Indiana, Somerset, and Westmoreland counties	05-18-1967	07-10-1967	A second hearing was held 05-19-1967
Evansburg State Park	New park	3,359.05 acres (1,359.36 ha)	Montgomery County	06-15-1967	04-18-1968	
Oil Creek State Park	New park	7,197.00 acres (2,912.52 ha)	Crawford and Venango counties	08-10-1967	11-14-1967	
Ohiopyle State Park	Addition	155.00 acres (62.73 ha)	Fayette County	06-17-1968	07-18-1968	
Mt. Pisgah State Park	New park	1,024.30 acres (414.52 ha)	Bradford County	06-23-1968	07-18-1968	
Jacobsburg State Park	New park	646.81 acres (261.75 ha)	Northampton County	01-30-1969	03-28-1969	
Blue Marsh State Park	New park	500.00 acres (202.34 ha)	Berks County	03-27-1969	06-30-1969	Now Blue Marsh Lake and Pennsylvania State Game Lands Number 280. Park was completed, but without funds to operate it, so was given to the Pennsylvania Game Commission, now also partly a U.S. Army Corps of Engineers site
Allegheny River State Park	New park	3,207.40 acres (1,297.99 ha)	Venango County	05-02-1969	07-29-1969	Now part of Clear Creek State Forest

== List of county parks ==
Park	Type	Acres (Hectares)	County	Public Hearing Date	Governor Approval Date	Comments
Moon Lake Park	New park	650 acres (260 ha)	Luzerne County			
Two Mile Run County Park	New park		Venango County			
