= Lackawanna Heritage Valley National and State Heritage Area =

United States National Heritage Area in Pennsylvania

- Location within Pennsylvania Location within the United States
- Location: Pennsylvania, United States
- Coordinates: 41°24′32″N 75°40′36″W
- Established: 1991
- Governing body: Lackawanna Heritage Valley Authority
- Website: www.lhva.org

The Lackawanna Heritage Valley National and State Heritage Area is a state and federally designated National Heritage Area in northeastern Pennsylvania. It was initially established in 1991 as the first State Heritage Park in Pennsylvania, and was additionally designated a National Heritage Area in 2000. The designations recognize the area's heritage of industry, architecture, history and natural resources, and provide a framework for development and promotion of these features. The Lackawanna Heritage Valley National and State Heritage Area is managed by the Lackawanna Heritage Valley Authority, or LHVA.

The National Heritage Area comprises the Lackawanna River watershed as it descends through Carbondale and Scranton to its junction with the Susquehanna River at Pittston. The heritage area covers portions of Lackawanna, Susquehanna, Wayne and Luzerne counties. The area is strongly identified with anthracite coal mining and the industries which depended on the coal, such as railroading, locomotive-building and rail-making.

Major components of the heritage area include Steamtown National Historic Site, the Pennsylvania Anthracite Heritage Museum and the Electric City Trolley Museum.

== See also ==
- List of mountain biking areas and trails in Pennsylvania
- List of National Heritage Areas in the United States
