= Susquehanna Warrior Trail =

Rail trail in Luzerne County, Pennsylvania

Coordinates: 41.18°N 76.09°W

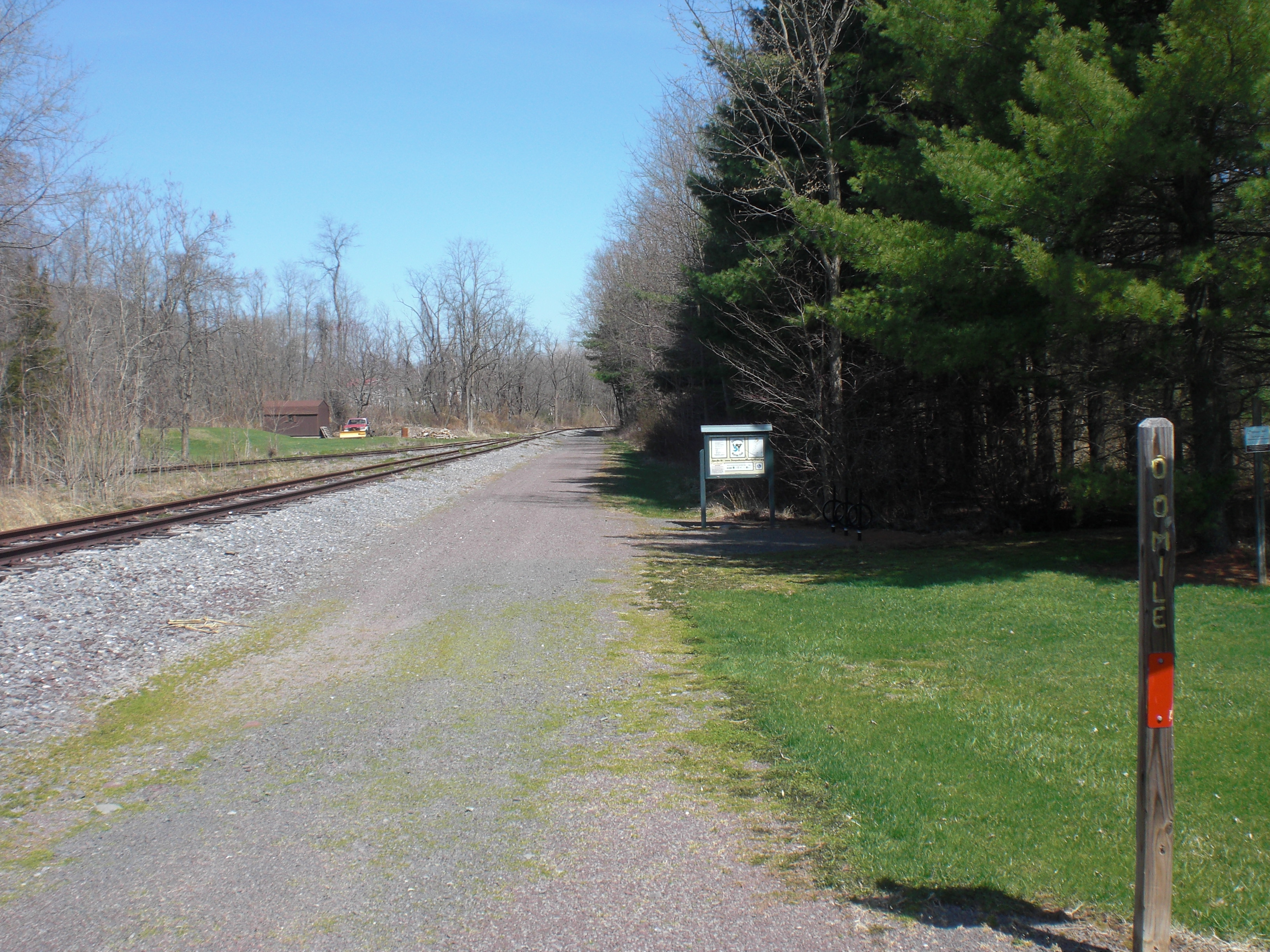
- The Susquehanna Warrior Trail at its southern terminus in the Susquehanna Riverlands
- Length: 12.21 mi (19.65 km)
- Location: Luzerne County, Pennsylvania
- Established: 2007
- Trailheads: PPL riverlands, Shickshinny, Garden Drive-In.
- Use: Hiking, Bicycling, Running
- Elevation gain/loss: Approximately 0
- Sights: Susquehanna River, Garden Drive-In
- Surface: crushed stone
- Right of way: railroad (former)
- Website: www.susquehannawarriortrail.org

The Susquehanna Warrior Trail is a 12.21-mile (19.65 km) (Note: The trail has a 1.4-mile (2.3 km) section that is not connected with the main trail.) rail trail for bicyclists and pedestrians that runs along the west bank of the Susquehanna River in Luzerne County, Pennsylvania. The trail was created in 2005, and opened to the public in 2007. The Susquehanna Warrior Trail has not yet been dedicated. The trail is part of a plan to create a trail network covering all of Luzerne County.

== Route description ==
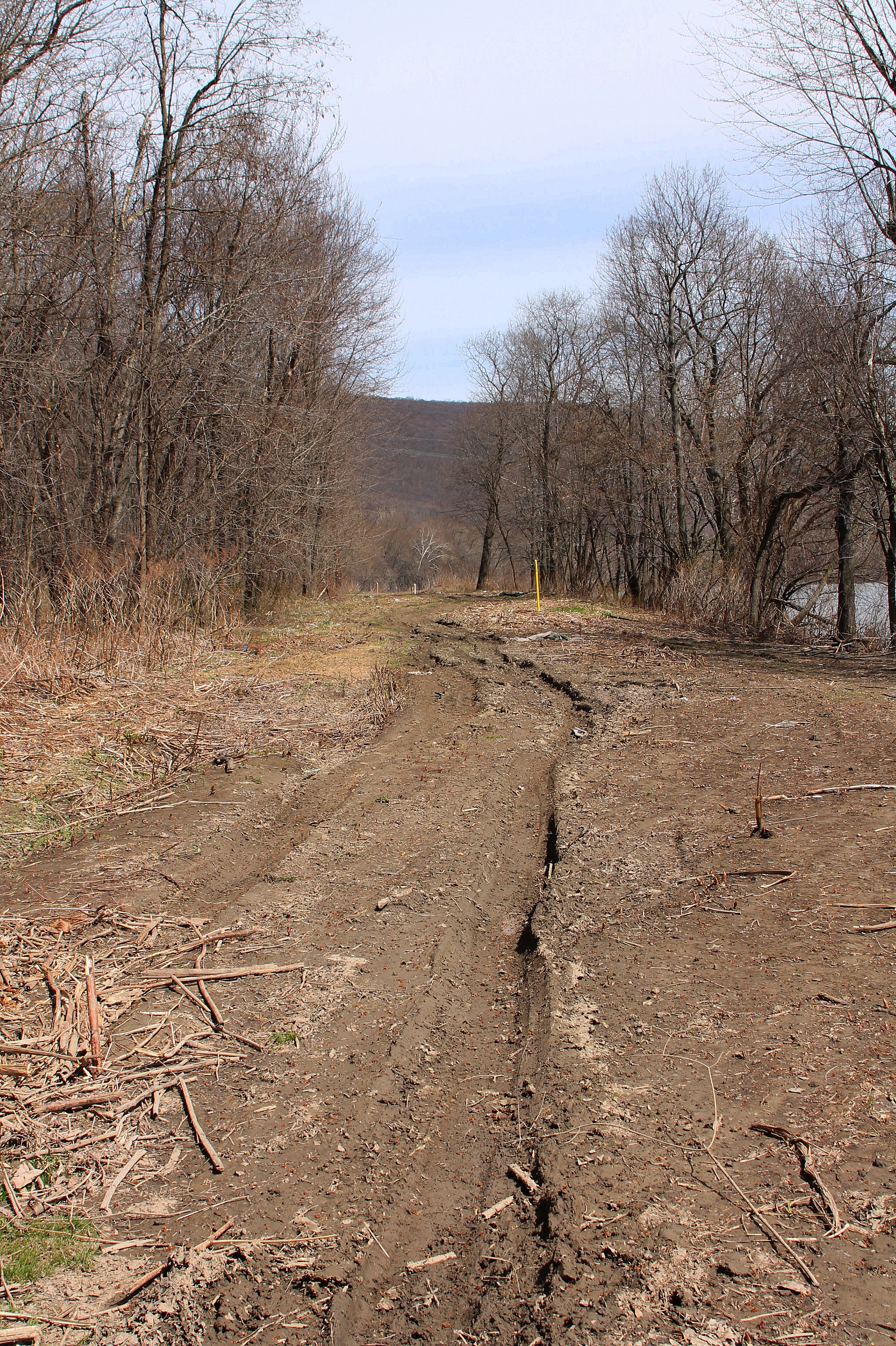
A stretch of the trail south of Shickshinny

The southern section of the Susquehanna Warrior Trail begins on a side road off U.S. Route 11 two or three miles upstream along the Susquehanna River from Wapwallopen. It parallels U.S. Route 11 for 1.4 miles before joining the main section.

The main section of the Susquehanna Warrior Trail begins on U.S. Route 11, about two miles (3.2 km) south of Shickshinny and 0.2 miles north of the southern section of the trail. The trail parallels US 11 for most of the way. After about 1.7 miles (2.7 km), it goes briefly through the streets of Shickshinny before crossing over Shickshinny Creek and exiting Shickshinny. At roughly the 7.9-mile (12.7 km) mark, the Susquehanna Warrior Trail crosses over Hunlock Creek. The trail's north end is in the Garden Drive-In, about two miles (3.2 km) northwest of Nanticoke.

The Susquehanna Warrior Trail is between 8 feet (2.4 m) and 10 feet (3.0 m) wide.

== History ==
Historically, there was a Native American footpath where the Susquehanna Warrior Trail is.

=== From abandoned railway to trail ===
The Susquehanna Warrior Trail began as the old Delaware, Lackawanna, and Western railroad bed. In 1995, the Pennsylvania Environmental Counsel received grants from the Pennsylvania Department of Conservation and Natural Resources and Luzerne County to begin planning to convert the old railroad bed into a trail. Three years later, in 1998, the plan was completed and the Pennsylvania Department of Conservation of Natural Resources, the Pennsylvania Department of Transportation, and the Berwick HWF funded the project. Construction of the trail began in 2005. The trail was opened to the public in 2007. The trail was damaged by Tropical Storm Lee in 2011. However, numerous volunteers repaired the damage.

The Pennsylvania Society for Ornithology visited the Susquehanna Warrior Trail on June 2, 2013, as part of their annual meeting. As of December 2013, the president of the Susquehanna Warrior Trail is Lance Kittelson.

=== Possible expansion ===
It has been proposed that the Susquehanna Warrior Trail could be extended three miles (4.8 km) north, as far as Plymouth Township. According to an April 2012 article in the Wilkes-Barre newspaper, Times Leader, if "everything goes well and funding is available, the trail should be extended sometime in the next year." The trail would continue to follow the old railroad bed past the site of the Avondale Mine Disaster.

The trail may even be extended as far north as the intersection of US 11 and the South Cross Valley Expressway, where it will connect with the numerous trails near Wilkes-Barre. Additionally, in some years the Susquehanna Warrior Trail may be extended as far south as Berwick. Also, there is the possibility of gates being installed to prevent illegal dumping on the Susquehanna Warrior Trail. It was originally intended that the gates would be installed in April 2013, but they have not been installed as of May 6, 2013. The length of the finished trail is expected to be 16 miles one way.

== Biology ==
Eagles, egrets, and herons have been observed on the Susquehanna Warrior Trail, as have other animals, such as otters. Riparian forests and meadows are located near the Susquehanna Warrior Trail.

== Activities ==
The Susquehanna Warrior Trail supports multiple uses: bicycling, running, and hiking. During the winter, the trail is used for cross-country skiing. Since 2008 there has been a 3.1-mile (5.0 km) footrace on the Susquehanna Warrior Trail. The course record for it is 16 minutes and 46 seconds.

== See also ==
- List of rail trails in Pennsylvania
- List of mountain biking areas and trails in Pennsylvania
