= Lehigh Gorge State Park =

State park in Pennsylvania, United States

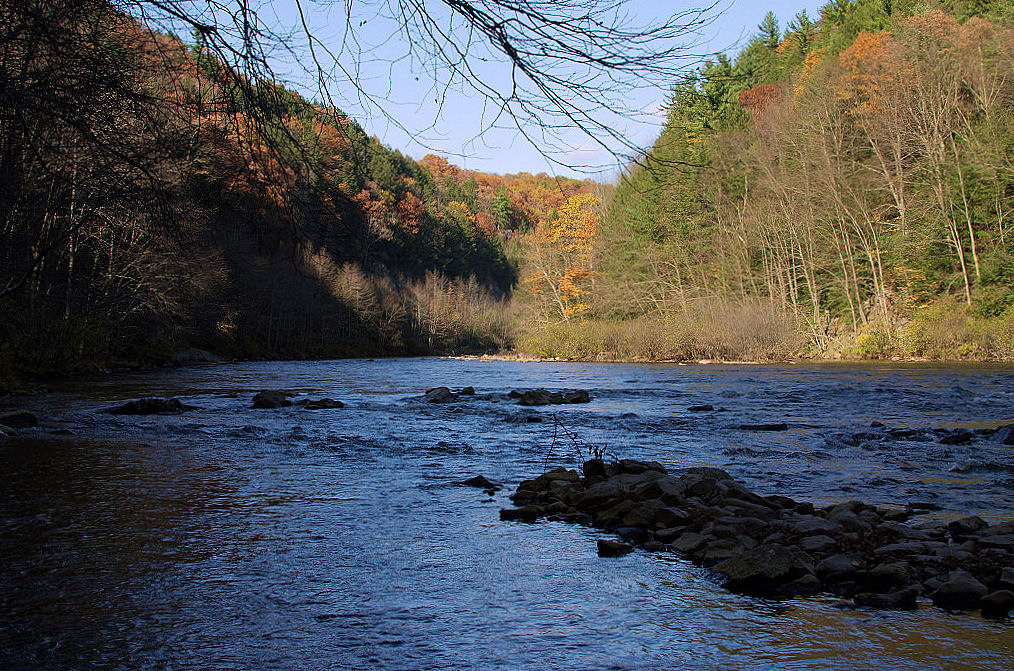
- Interactive map of Lehigh Gorge State Park
- Location: Luzerne and Carbon counties, Pennsylvania, United States
- Coordinates: 41°03′47″N 75°46′23″W (north access area)
- Area: 6,107 acres (2,471 ha)
- Elevation: 1,027 feet (313 m)
- Established: 1980
- Administrator: Pennsylvania Department of Conservation and Natural Resources
- Website: Official website
- Pennsylvania State Parks

Lehigh Gorge State Park is a 4,548 acres (1,841 ha) Pennsylvania state park in Luzerne and Carbon Counties, Pennsylvania. The park encompasses a gorge, which stretches along the Lehigh River from a U.S. Army Corps of Engineers flood control dam in Luzerne County to Jim Thorpe in Carbon County.

The primary recreational activity at Lehigh Gorge State Park is white water rafting.

== Park access ==
There are three primary access areas for the park. The northern access point is at White Haven, just off exit 273 of Interstate 80 on Pennsylvania Route 940. This is the important northern entrance into the river cut gully or gap between highlands, and was an important barge loading transshipment point on the newly extended upper Lehigh Canal fed initially by a shortline railroad from the Mountain Top yard dating from the 1837 enabling legislation set up to join the Lehigh and Susquehanna Valleys via Mountain Top and the Ashley Planes incline railway.

The central access point is near Rockport, a few miles off Pennsylvania Route 93 near the borough of Weatherly, where the mountainous terrain is transitional, creating a relatively shallow sloped flat. This area was also historically important regional rail transport.

The southern access point is just off exit 74 of Interstate 476 via U.S. Route 209 through Jim Thorpe and across the bridge to the north bank on Pennsylvania Route 903 to the Glen Onoko neighborhood, formerly East Mauch Chunk the left bank or northern part of the borough of Jim Thorpe. This access point is on the opposite bank from the Glen Onoko nature and hiking trail which climbs up slope westerly alongside the tributary descending Glen Onoko Falls giving the eponymous name to that region of the lower gorge, whilst the Lehigh descends through several sharp curves before reaching the slack water elevation of Nesquehoning Junction between Jim Thorpe and Nesquehoning. The two railroad lines which competed for trade along the Lehigh diverge to run on opposite shores at this entrance.

== Course ==
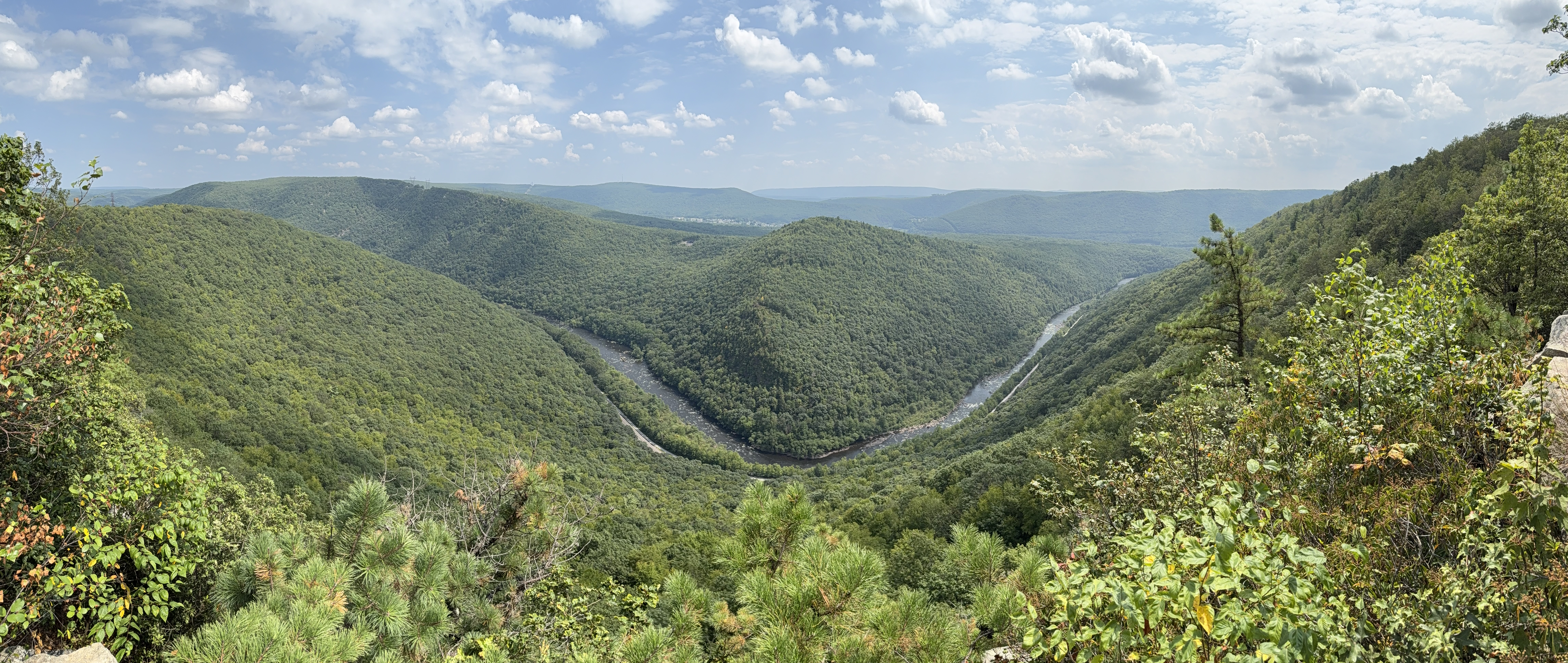
Broad Mountain Overlook provides a view of the park from State Game Lands 141 in Lehigh Township

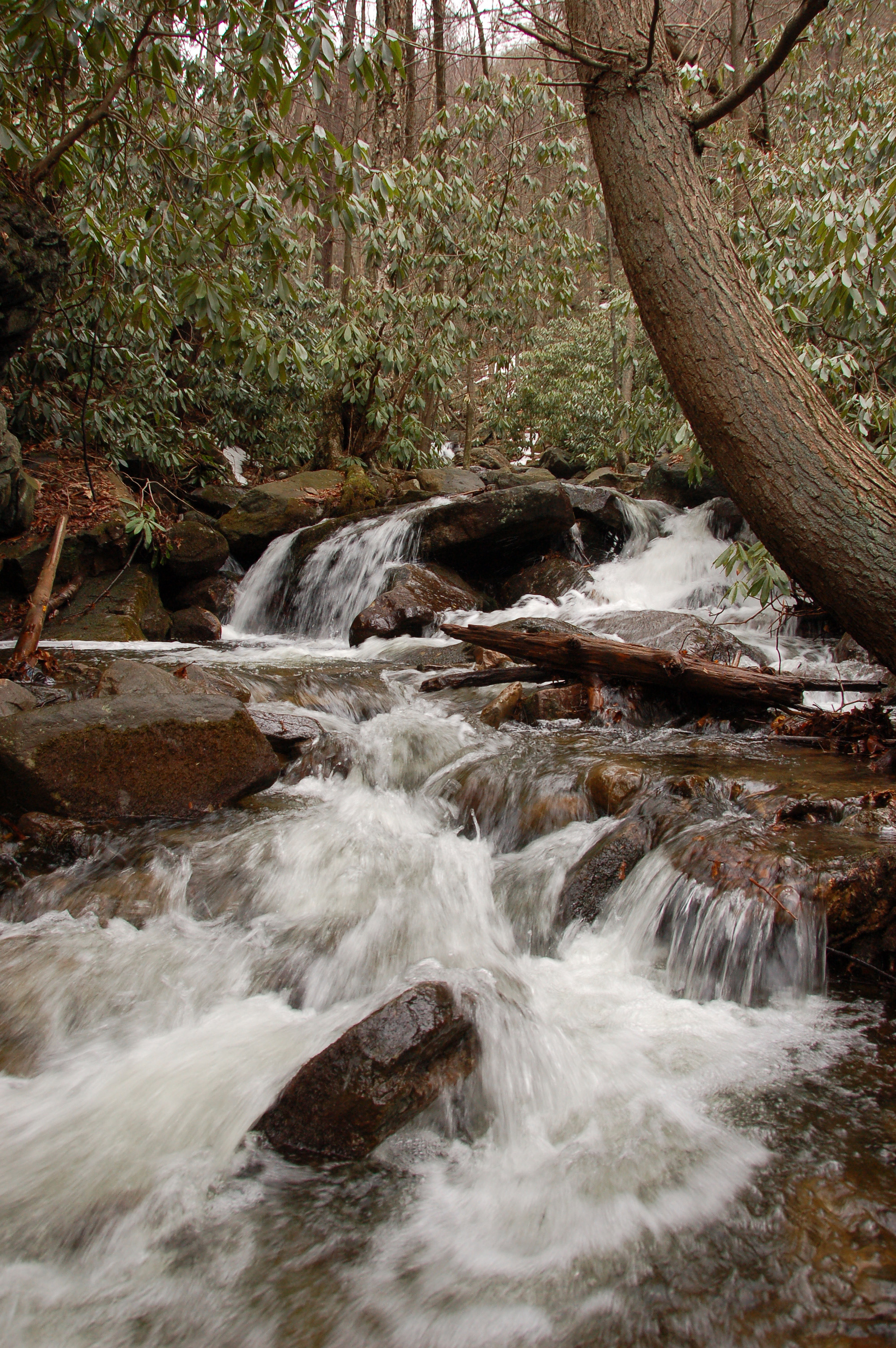
Glen Onoko Creek, a section of the cascade waterfalls on the right bank of the Lehigh River, December 2007

The Lehigh River forms the border between Carbon and Luzerne counties in the northern part of the park. The northern end of Lehigh Gorge State Park is just below the U.S. Army Corps of Engineers Francis E. Walter Dam, in Bear Creek Township on the right bank (Luzerne County) and Kidder Township on the left bank (Carbon County). The Lehigh River flows generally south and enters Dennison Township, then the borough of White Haven, the northern access point, on the right (Luzerne) bank. It enters the borough of East Side, opposite White Haven.

Leaving the boroughs, the river enters Foster Township on the right (Luzerne) bank, and returns to Kidder Township, passing Hickory Run State Park on the left (Carbon) bank.

The river and park then leave Luzerne County, with the southern part of the park entirely within Carbon County. Lehigh Township is on the right bank, with the river entering Penn Forest Township soon after on the left bank. The river veers west here and makes a large, tight bend at Rockport and the central access point (right bank), before heading back east, then south, west, and then generally south again. Some of the land bordering the river here is Pennsylvania State Game Lands Number 141. The park then enters the borough of Jim Thorpe on the left bank, then the borough of Nesquehoning on the right bank, with the Glen Onoko southern access point on the right bank in Lehigh Township, just before Nesquehoning. Soon both banks of the river are within the borough of Jim Thorpe, and shortly after this the park ends, just above the Pennsylvania Route 903 bridge.

The Lehigh Gorge Trail, a multi-use rail trail, follows the right bank of the Lehigh River south through the park from the village of Port Jenkins in Dennison Township in Luzerne County to Glen Onoko in Lehigh Township in Carbon County.

== History ==
The history of Lehigh Gorge State Park is tied into the development of anthracite coal mining, which was once the center of the high-tech economy of northeastern Pennsylvania. It is also tied into the early-to-middle period of the United States' Canal Era and the rapid development of pragmatic railroading technologies and consequent accelerated growth and use of railroads—all contributing factors in the Pennsylvanian and North American Industrial Revolution. By the 1790s deforestation of the American East, like it had in Britain a century earlier, was making the search for alternative fuels urgent and with England's experience of coal many were willing to invest in ventures to somehow mine and ship Anthracite east to the Delaware River where it could be barged to the cities of the east coast of the United States. England's technological lead was obvious and its extensive canal system was given much credit for the success of Britain's industries and its emergence as the sole world power at the end of the Seven Years' War.

While eight mules could carry a ton, each 4-5 mules needed a human to lead them and their loads needed to be laboriously loaded and unloaded at the beginning and end of each day's march. It was the end days of the era that had held for millennia— when shipping bulks goods was only practicable over long distances by water, and one consequence was roads were not much more than unimproved tracks frequently more muddy ruts or filled with rocky obstacles as they wandered about trees and along ridgelines striving to stay above streams. Wagons were useful only on locally improved roads and with a traditional labor shortage and lack of distinct feudal structures there were few ways to draft a large enough work party to improve roads even within a township, so in the main they remained primitive. Traditional Amerindian footpaths or game trails did not co-exist readily with carts or wagons, and bridges were scarce while streams swarm along the bottom of every valley in rain-blessed Pennsylvania.

=== 1790s–1820 ===
High grade coal was discovered by a hunter on Sharp Mountain in 1791 above the steep sided valleys surrounding Tamaqua, but the news quickly led to other discoveries such as on at the minor peak called Summit Hill on Pisgah Mountain six miles due east of Tamaqua and as much closer to the ship-navigable Delaware watershed—from Summit Hill, the rapids plagued Lehigh River and the higher capacity of boats was but just over a ridge and a half days haul by mules away. Both mineral-finds lead directly to rapid coal mining development of the area, which began first commercially by a joint stock company, the Lehigh Coal Mining Company (LCMC) at Summit Hill in 1792. Shortly after other coal mining ventures also began up the Susquehanna in a third watershed, the Wyoming Valley west of the Poconos and also to west of Tamaqua, Pennsylvania in the Schuylkill Valley as well as closer to Harrisburg down the Ridge-and-valley Appalachians. Given the fundamental need of fuels, it is little wonder the financiers of the day were willing investors ready to back projects which promised to get supplies to new markets. The gorge became historic and not just scenic when such investors came together to continue the English model, canals between major cities of source and supply, if necessary carried across viaducts above streams to provide cheap bulk materials transfers. By the early 1820s, the new management of the Lehigh Coal Mining Company would show the way and the LCMC would disappear as a subsidiary corporation and became a key element in one of the nation's first vertical mergers.

=== The transitional 1820s ===
In 1818, fed up with sporadic and unreliable deliveries by the Lehigh Coal Mining Company, several Philadelphia foundry owners, led by two known for high tech thinking, combined and leased the mining rights and took over management of LCMC. They also formed the Lehigh Navigation Company (LCN) to build navigations up the Lehigh River to a place where barges, not just cargo boats could be loaded with greater coal production—and more importantly, the several rapids which swallowed many a coal boat in the prior decade could be tamed. This early 1818 plan would put coal within 12 miles of a reliable water transport route to Philadelphia, and the Lehigh Navigation Company (LCN)'s had no trouble recruiting workers nor raising money to make the lower Lehigh Canal—up to the southern mouth of the Lehigh Gorge. The project would also inspire other canal works such as the Erie and Morris, Pennsylvania, and Delaware & Hudson canals. By 1820 the dams and locks of all the downstream navigations were in place up to the confluence of the river and Nesquehoning Creek near the mouth of the Gorge at the flats below Mount Pisgah between Mauch Chunk and Nesquehoning—a great bending flat bottomed former lake bed between steep sided valley walls. Hence LC&N had tamed the lower river and a mule road was operating reliably enough to deliver coal in a timely manner from Summit Hill and new mines being dug at what are now Lansford and Coaldale.

By 1822, the navigations reached the broad flats of Mauch Chunk and the two companies were merged into the Lehigh Coal & Navigation Company, the company which would tame the gorge. By 1824, the Lehigh Canal was shipping record amounts of coal and adding further navigations creating a two way barge highway, this set the stage to founding the Upper Grand Section of the Lehigh Canal through ambitious improvements through the Gorge between White Haven and Jim Thorpe, with a rail link from the Susquehanna at Pittston via Ashley, Mountain Top, and White Haven which would allow goods from Pittsburgh and the Ohio river valley and coal from the Wilkes-Barre area to come east to coastal market cities.

=== 1830s canal days ===
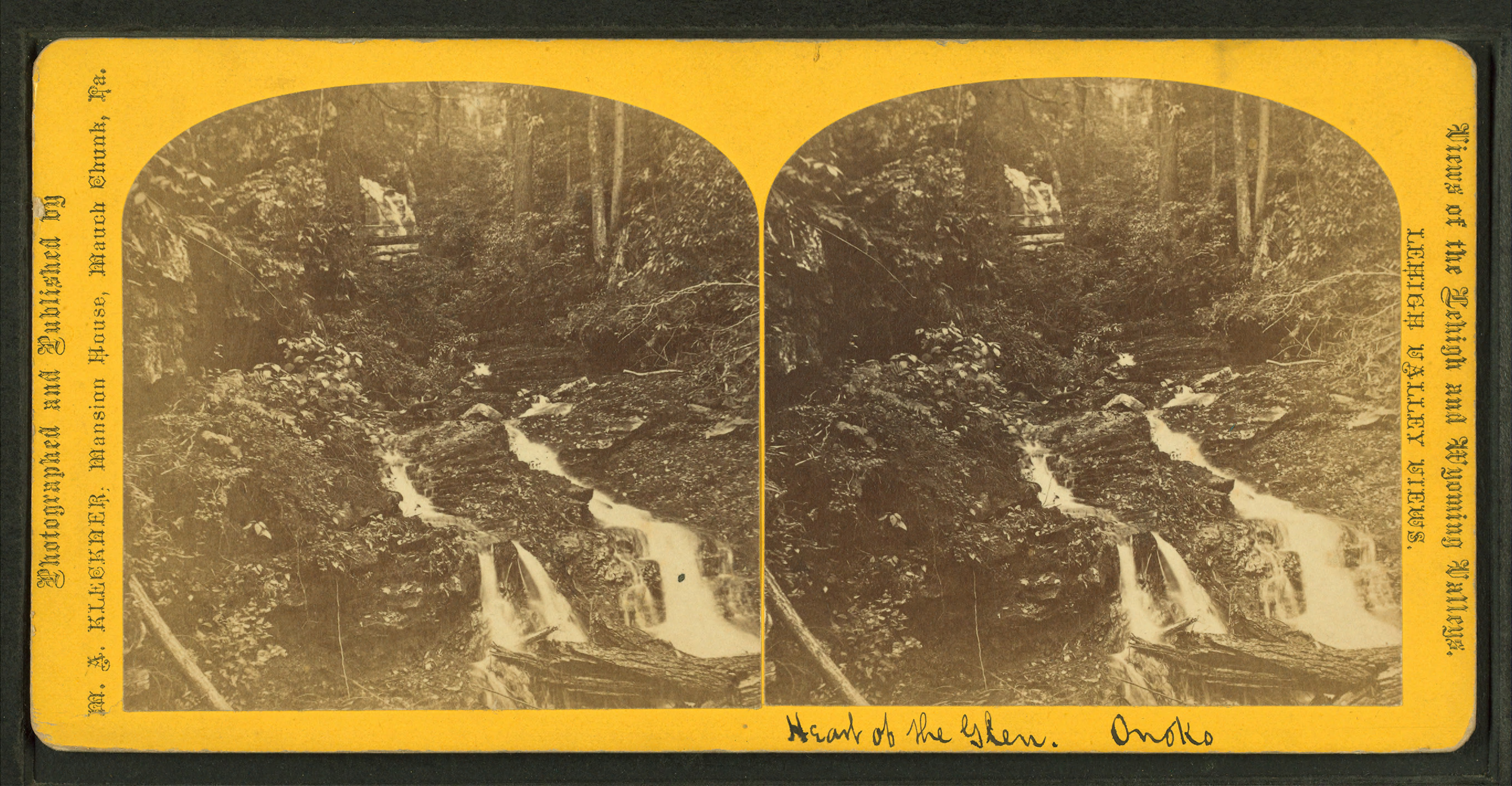
Historic stereoscopic view of the Glen Onoko Falls on the Lehigh River through the nature-destroyed remains of the former lower lock just above navigable waters in the Lehigh River

By mid-decade in the 1820s, inspired by LC&N success and the Erie Canal the state legislature had formed the Canal Commission and begun funding the survey work and start up of the future Pennsylvania Canal— which was in the planning conception, Railroads being new untried technology in its infancy— to also put an actual long canal channel between the Schuylkill basin (Delaware Valley) and the Susquehanna (connecting the Potomac Valley, Baltimore, Harrisburg, Richmond and Washington, D.C.) as well as an ambitious and audacious subproject of crossing the Alleghenies (see Allegheny Portage Railroad), which in the early funding took most of the monies delaying the easier ditch across the Pennsylvanian Great Valley. Other factions pointed out by the early 1830s that the long channel across Pennsylvania's great valley would be expensive and that given the experience building the Allegheny Portage Railroad, a similar work could be constructed along with Navigations through the Lehigh River Gorge. By that time, the city fathers of Baltimore were directly trying to compete for the trans-Allegheny trade by incorporation of the ambitious goals of Baltimore and Ohio Railroad to surmount to the Monongahela and Ohio valleys via the Cumberland Narrows mountain pass, despite the early lack of power and speed in the untried railroad technologies. Moreover, LC&N had constructed the locally sensationalized 18 mile loop of Mauch Chunk & Summit Hill Railway (1827), the nation's second railway and one of its first tourist attractions, said to be the inspiration for the roller coaster—in which role it lived on in tourist trade until the 1930s, when it was sold to Japan for scrap. By 1837 a proposal extending the Pennsylvania Canal was passed enabling legislation for the LC&N to spearhead a similar gravity railroad from Penobscot to White Haven, whilst extending the Navigations on the Lehigh up through the Gorge and constructing a shortline railroad, the Lehigh and Susquehanna from wharves across Wilkes-Barre between its suburbs Pittston to Ashley, climbing the Mount Penobscot on the Ashley Planes Inclined Plane Railroad .

However, Lehigh Gorge and its rapid waters stood in the way as barges could not pass the rapids. This relegated to shipping coal by slow mule train, which is labor-intensive and costly, as it is pragmatically limited to an eighth ton per mule. After 1818 fuel shortages were growing acute, and the partially barged and partial mule-trained coal deliveries by the Lehigh Coal Mining Company were unpredictable and sporadic. This problem was solved by Josiah White who leased the operating rights and also formed the Lehigh Navigation Company and began to systematically put into place the original series of dams and locks and channel improvements of the navigation from Easton on the Delaware the 40 miles up to the Mauch Chunk Creek, outletting in area of today's Lehighton, which streamside trail was the easiest descent for the mule trains to reach the river about twelve miles from the Summit Hill and Lansford mines. By 1820 the navigations had fixed the worst of the barging issues, a road from the mines was systematically being improved easing the teamster's problems and the ventures began to make substantial money; by 1822 the two companies were combined into the Lehigh Coal & Navigation Company and both the navigational works and the mule road were re-routed so they reached Mauch Chunk, the mule road high enough to dump coal by chutes into barges on the town's quay. By 1824 the company was flush with cash, had been further improving the lower river with two way locks— and seeking other sources, began buying more coal lands and eventually bought lands around Hazleton and Ashley and the saddle shaped mountain pass above at Penobscot, Pennsylvania (now Mountain Top) above both south Wilkes-Barre on the Susquehanna and White Haven on the Lehigh at the head of the gorge.

LC&N which built Navigations through the gorge by reshaping the river, initially to the foot of Mount Pisgah, Carbon County, Pennsylvania at the junction of Pisgah Ridge and Nesquehoning Ridges. Twenty dams and twenty nine locks were built between what was then known as Mauch Chunk (now Jim Thorpe) and White Haven. The Upper Grand Section of the Lehigh Canal was destroyed by severe flooding in the mid-19th century and was eventually replaced by railroads.

Between November 1852 and September 1855 a railway line was built for the Lehigh Valley Railroad Company, largely by Asa Packer's personal credit, from Mauch Chunk, later renamed Jim Thorpe, to Easton.

=== Lumber ===
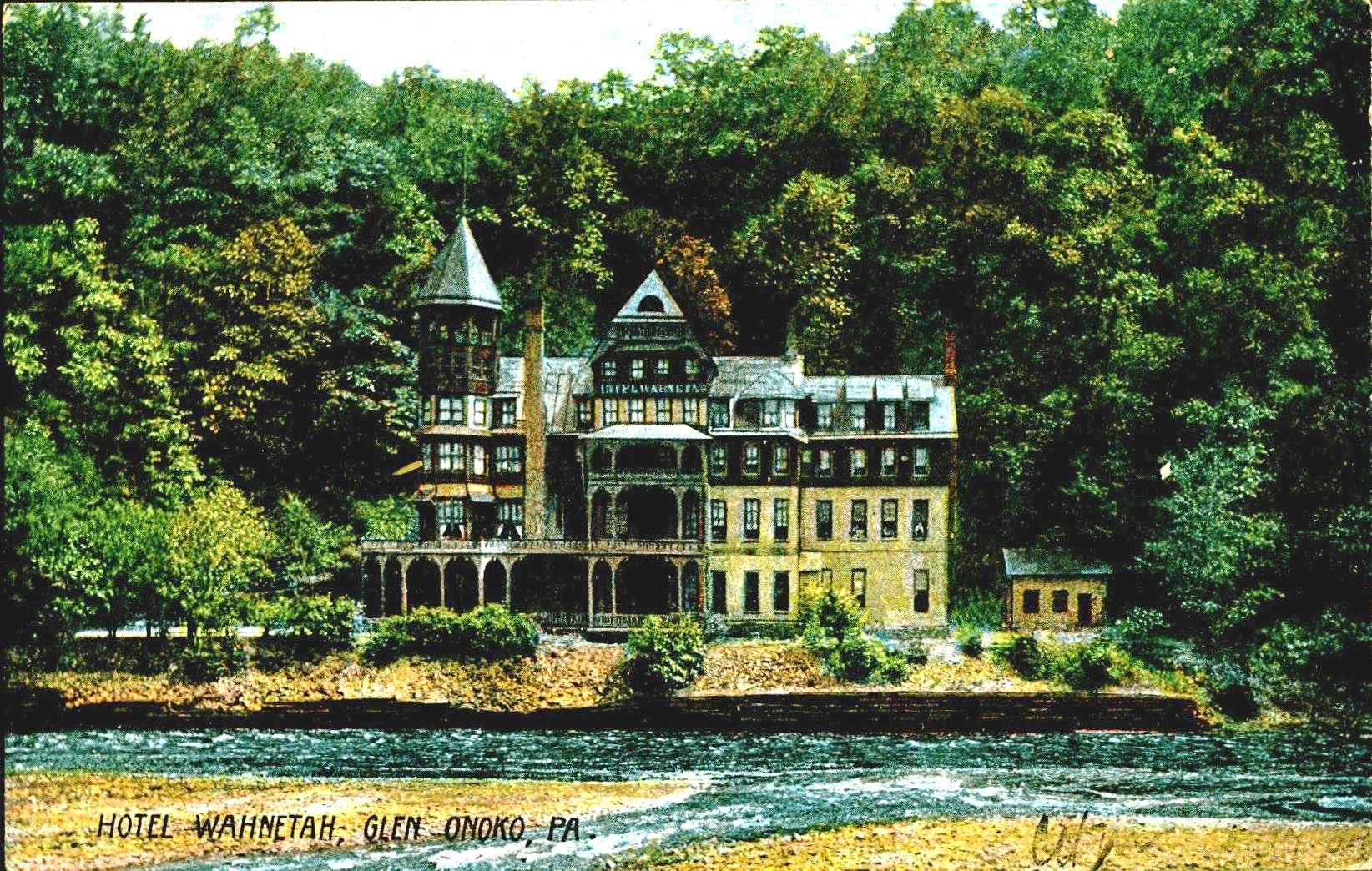
A 1907 postcard of the park

Naturalist and painter John James Audubon visited the Lehigh Gorge in 1829 and spent over a month painting the birds of the area. At this time the gorge was largely untouched by human hands, but Audubon could see that this was not to last. The demand for lumber was intense during the mid-to-late 19th century and the forests of much of Pennsylvania were stripped bare. Lehigh Gorge was no exception, its old-growth forests of white pine and hemlock were harvested and sent down the Lehigh River. The wood was used for lumber and the bark was used in tanneries to make leather. The second largest tannery in the United States was along the Lehigh River at the small town of Lehigh Tannery. By 1875 most of the saleable timber had been clear-cut, with many acres of dried treetops and other wooden debris left on the ground. That same year a spark from a passing coal-fired steam locomotive ignited a massive forest fire that burned the debris, the remaining standing timber, the sawmills, and their lumber stockpiles. This forest fire brought about the end of the lumber era in the Lehigh Gorge.

=== From resort to state park ===
Lehigh Gorge was a resort area for a brief time at the turn of the 20th century. Railroads operated tourist lines that led to a resort area at Glen Onoko. The resort hotel there had 47 rooms, tennis courts, a dance pavilion, and trails that led to the scenic Glen Onoko Falls. This area was very popular with people seeking to get away from the polluted cities in the northeastern United States. The hotel and surrounding forests were destroyed by fire in the 1910s and the Lehigh Gorge area was largely forgotten until the 1970s. The abandonment of the main line of the Central Railroad of New Jersey through the Gorge (in 1972) provided the necessary real estate for the trail. The Commonwealth of Pennsylvania purchased this right of way from the Reading Company, leading to the establishment of Lehigh Gorge State Park in 1980.

== Recreation ==
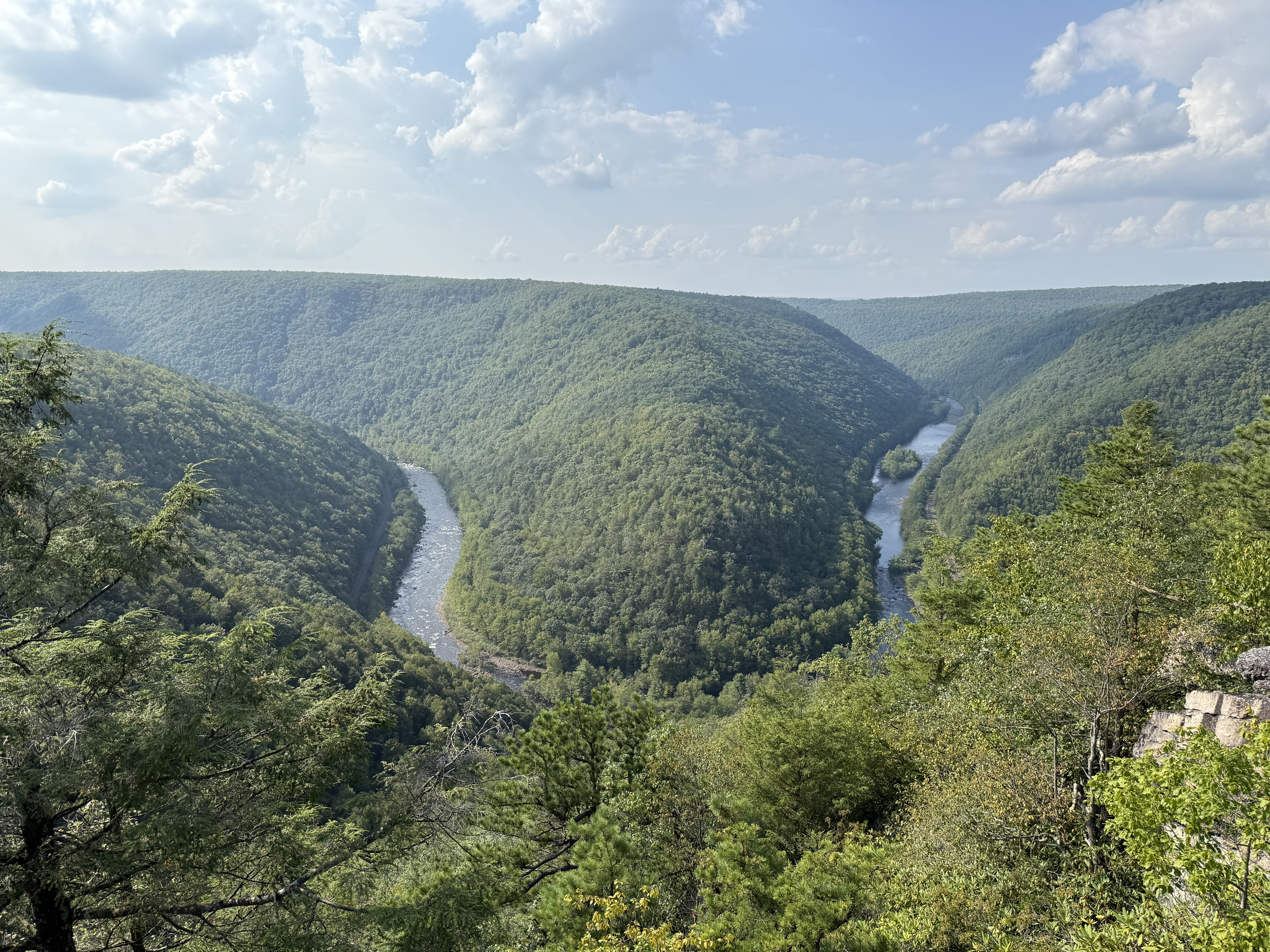
Tank Hollow Overlook provides a view of the park from State Game Lands 141 in Penn Forest Township

Glen Onoko Falls Trail

The primary recreational use of Lehigh Gorge State Park is on the whitewater of the gorge. Other uses are hiking, bicycling, sight seeing and animal/bird watching along the abandoned railroad grade of the Lehigh Gorge Trail. The park is also open to hunting and fishing.

=== Rafting ===
Rafting is very popular in Lehigh Gorge State Park. The Lehigh River is rated a Class III river on the International Scale of River Difficulty, although this depends on the water conditions, which are generally best in the spring. The conditions are controlled by the amount of rainfall in the area and by the amount of water released from the Francis E. Walter Dam at White Haven by the U.S. Army Corps of Engineers. All boaters must wear life jackets that are in compliance with the rules and regulations of the United States Coast Guard. Several licensed commercial outfitters currently operate on the Lehigh River. This first white water rafting outfitter to operate on the Lehigh River was Whitewater Challengers, founded in 1975.

=== Trails ===
The Lehigh River in Lehigh Gorge State Park

The Lehigh Gorge Trail is a 26-mile (42 km), multiuse rail trail. The trail is part of the 165-mile (266 km), D & L Trail. It is open year-round for hiking and biking. Bicycle rentals and shuttle service are available. In the winter, the trail is open for cross-country skiing. A 15-mile (24 km) section from White Haven to Penn Haven Junction is open to snowmobiles. Parking for snowmobiles is available at the White Haven and Rockport trailheads. In addition to the Lehigh Gorge Trail, there are 7 miles of hiking-only trails. These hiking-only trails are neither marked, signed, nor mapped.

=== Hunting and fishing ===
Hunting is permitted in much of Lehigh Gorge State Park. Hunters must follow the rules and regulations of the Pennsylvania Game Commission. Common game species are ruffed grouse, squirrels, turkey, white-tailed deer, black bear and rabbits. The hunting of groundhogs is not permitted at the park. The Pennsylvania Fish and Boat Commission assures that anglers will have plenty of chances to catch fish by stocking trout in the waters of the Lehigh River.

== See also ==
- Turn Hole Tunnel, an abandoned railroad tunnel in the park at Glen Onoko
