= Delaware and Lehigh National Heritage Corridor =

United States National Heritage Area in Pennsylvania

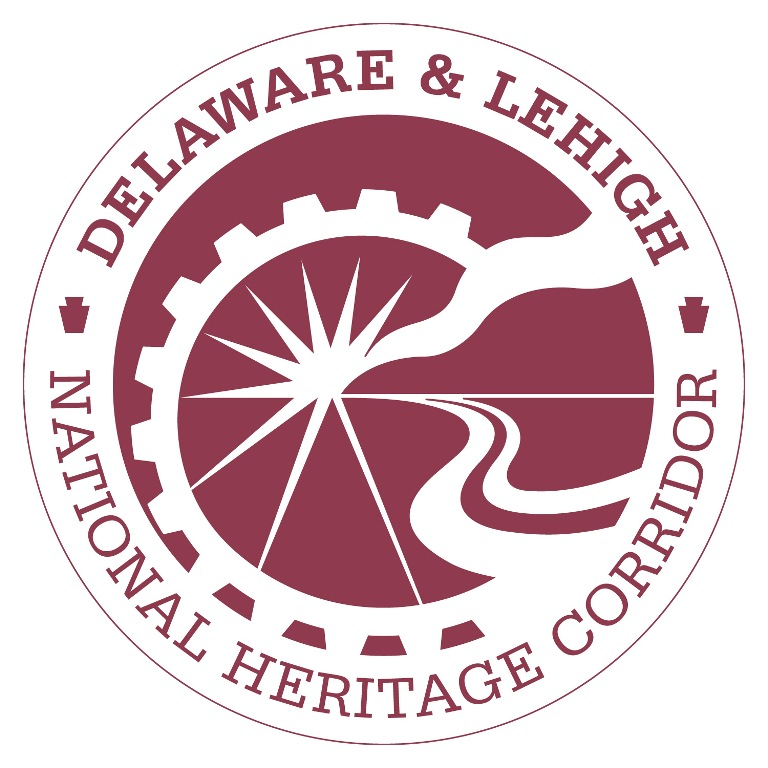

- Location of the Delaware and Lehigh National Heritage Corridor in Pennsylvania
- Location: Pennsylvania, U.S.
- Nearest city: Easton, Pennsylvania, U.S.
- Coordinates: 40°40.178′N 75°14.1823′W
- Length: 165 mi (266 km), North–South
- Max. elevation: Mountain Top, Pennsylvania
- Min. elevation: Bristol, Pennsylvania
- Established: 1988
- Visitors: 282,796 (in 2012)
- Governing body: Delaware and Lehigh National Heritage Corridor Commission
- Website: www.delawareandlehigh.org

Delaware & Lehigh Canal National and State Heritage Corridor (DLNHC) is a 165-mile (266 km) National Heritage Area in eastern Pennsylvania in the United States. It stretches from north to south, across five counties and over one hundred municipalities. It follows the historic routes of the Lehigh and Susquehanna Railroad, Lehigh Valley Railroad, the Lehigh Navigation, Lehigh Canal, and the Delaware Canal, from Bristol northeast of Philadelphia to Wilkes-Barre in the northeastern part of the state.

The backbone of the Corridor is the 165-mile (266 km) Delaware and Lehigh Trail. The Corridor's mission is to preserve heritage and conserve green space for public use in Bucks, Northampton, Lehigh, Carbon, and Luzerne counties in Pennsylvania. It also operates Hugh Moore Historical Park and Museums, which includes the National Canal Museum.

== Geography ==
The Corridor is a contiguous, five-county region in eastern Pennsylvania. It contains the counties of Luzerne, Lehigh, Carbon, Bucks, and Northampton. Major rivers include the Susquehanna, Delaware, and Lehigh.

=== Cities in the Corridor ===
- Allentown
- Bethlehem
- Easton
- Jim Thorpe
- Lehighton
- White Haven
- Wilkes-Barre
- Bristol
- Bensalem
- Centre Bridge
- Doylestown
- Fallsington
- Levittown
- Lumberville
- New Hope
- Morrisville
- Point Pleasant
- Raubsville
- Riegelsville
- Upper Black Eddy
- Uhlerstown
- Washington Crossing
- Yardley

=== Delaware and Lehigh Trail ===
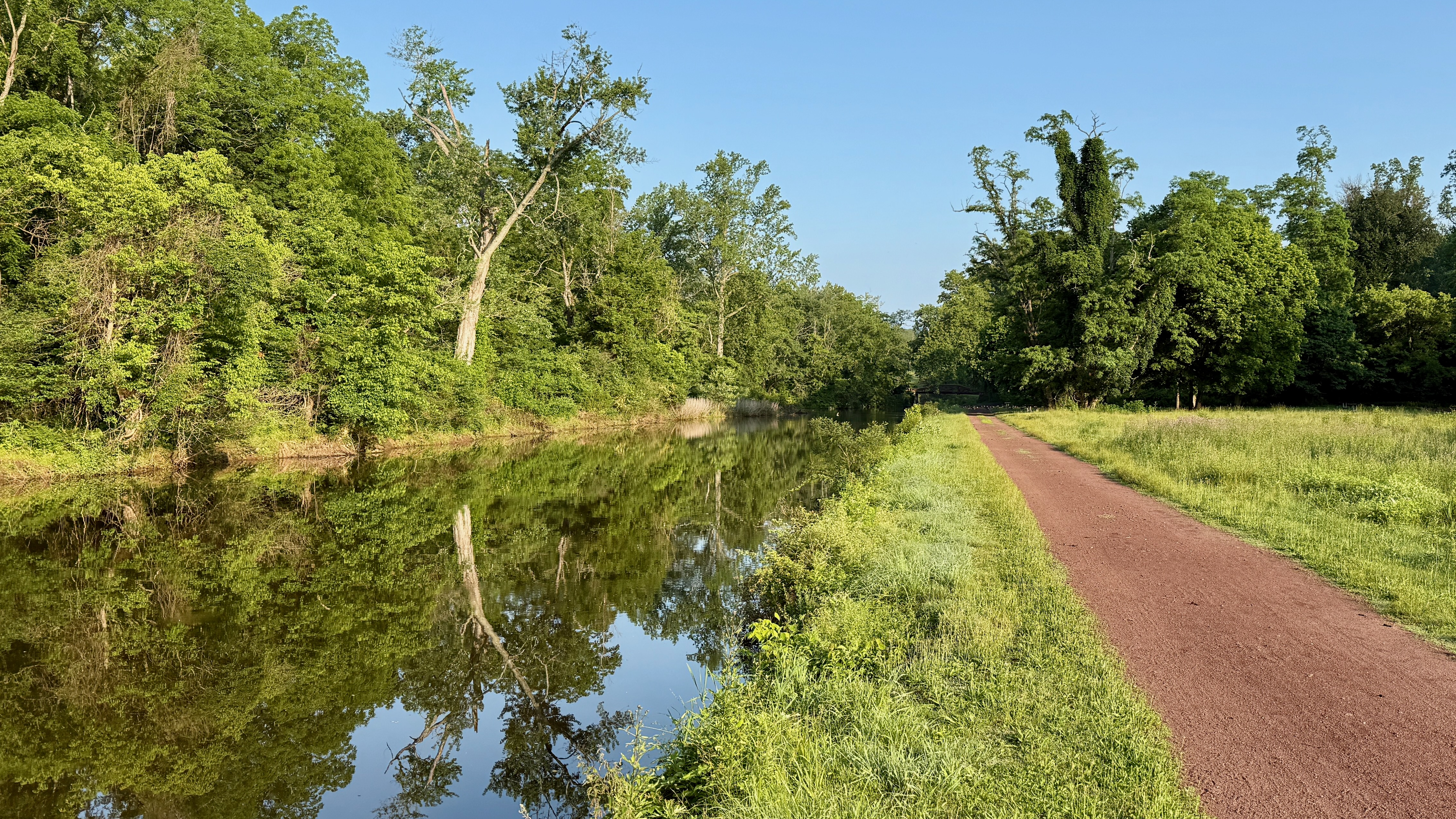
The Delaware and Lehigh Trail on the towpath of the Delaware Canal in Bucks County

The Delaware and Lehigh Trail is a 165-mile (266 km) multi-use trail. The trail incorporates rail trails, rails with trails, share-the-road sections, and canal towpaths. The trail follows the route that anthracite coal took from mine to market. It winds through northern mountains and along the banks of the Lehigh and Delaware Rivers through northeast Pennsylvania, the Lehigh Valley, and Bucks County. The D&L Trail passes through towns, industrial powerhouses, and along remnants of the Lehigh and Delaware canals. This earthen path exposes walkers, hikers, bicyclists, and others to Pennsylvania wildflowers, waterfalls, and wildlife.

As of 2014, approximately 135 miles (217 km) of the trail are completed. The southern terminus of the trail is in Bristol, Bucks County. The northern terminus of the trail is in Mountain Top in Luzerne County. Work has begun on extending the trail from Mountain Top—to—Wilkes Barre at Seven Tubs Natural Area.

From Mountain Top to White Haven, the trail is locally known as the Black Diamond Trail. From White Haven to Jim Thorpe, the trail is locally known as the Lehigh Gorge Trail, a 26-mile (42 km) section that parallels the Lehigh River and the valley of the Lehigh Gorge at Lehigh Gorge State Park. From Easton to Bristol, the trail is known as the Delaware Canal towpath, a 60-mile (97 km) section that passes entirely through Delaware Canal State Park. The Delaware Canal towpath is a National Recreation Trail.

The highest point on the trail is 1,785 ft (544 m) in Mountain Top; the lowest point is 20 ft (6.1 m) in Bristol.

=== Recreation ===
The Corridor contains more than 100,000 acres (40,000 ha) of public lands for outdoor recreation, including many state, county, and local parks.

- Beltzville State Park
- Delaware Canal State Park
- Frances Slocum State Park
- Hickory Run State Park
- Jacobsburg State Park
- Lehigh Gorge State Park
- Moon Lake Park
- Nescopeck State Park
- Neshaminy State Park
- Ricketts Glen State Park
- Tyler State Park
- Washington Crossing Historic Park

=== Historical appreciation ===
The Corridor includes hundreds of historical sites related to a variety of subjects including: social development of young America (Leni Lenape) settlements, the anthracite coal mining era (the Molly Maguires labor movement), the Industrial Revolution (Bethlehem Steel), the development of systematic canals (the Lehigh Navigation, Lehigh and Delaware Canals), the development of rail transportation (Lehigh Valley Railroad), and the evolution of natural conservation (John J. Audubon and Bucks County conservation movement).

In 2017, DLNHC completed a merger with the National Canal Museum, combining the reaches of both the museum and the D&L Trail. DLNHC now operates the museum and provides information on the history, science, and technology of canal construction and navigation. They manage a collection and archive of artifacts of both the canal era and the industrial revolution.

== History ==
=== Pre-settlement ===
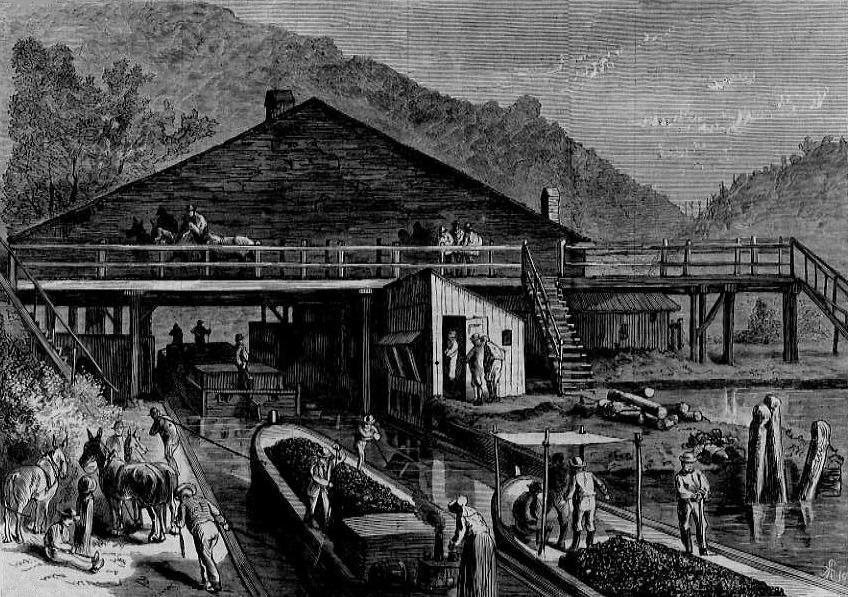
A weigh lock with scales to determine tolls in 1873

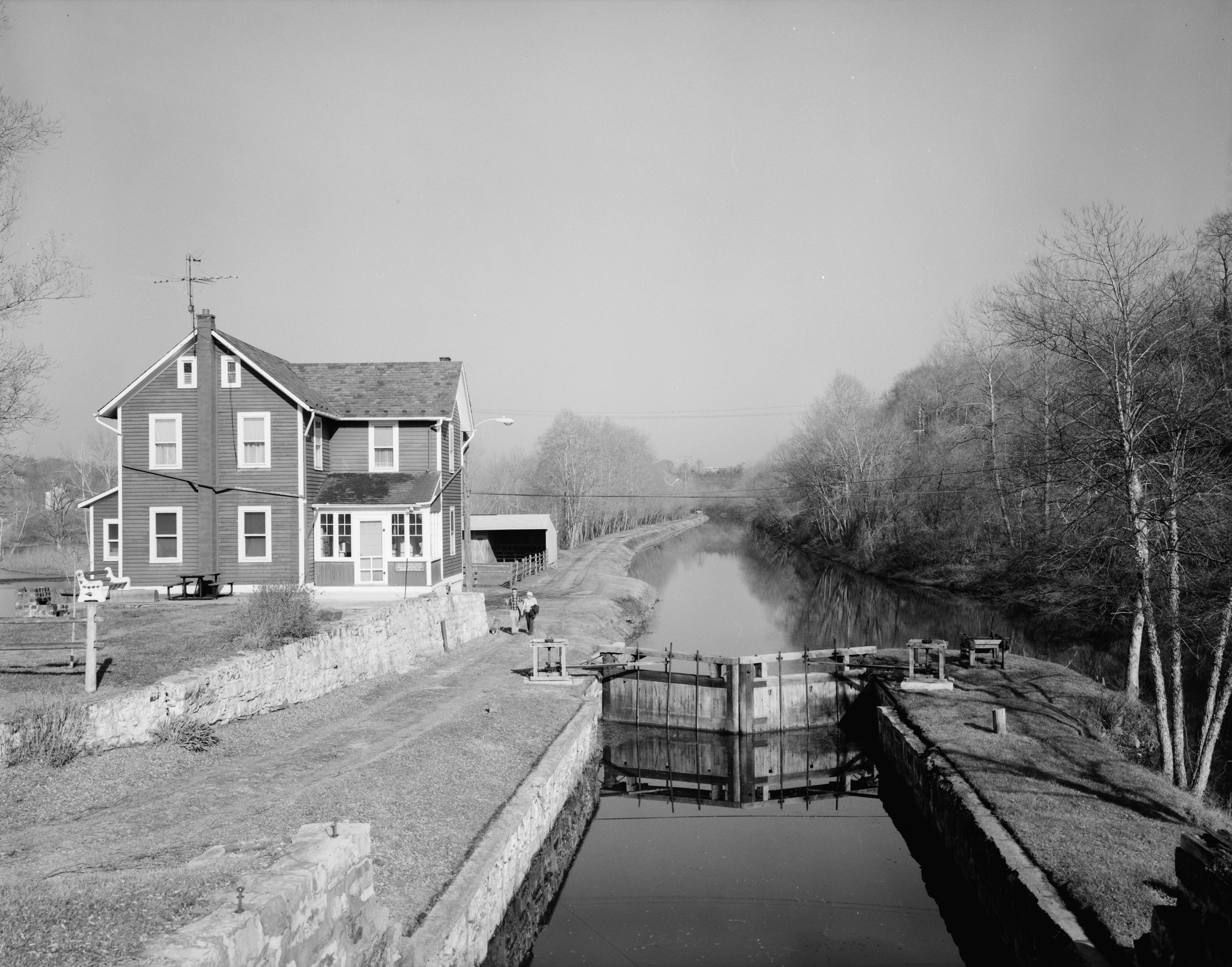
Locktender's House and Guard Lock 8

Native American tribes, including the Susquehannock, Iroquois, Lenape, and others frequently traveled through the northern region. The Delaware Canal parallels old trading routes. Many original Native American villages that developed here in the wilds of Pennsylvania drew European settlers in search of opportunity.

In 1791, Philip Grinder found anthracite coal in what is now Summit Hill, Pennsylvania in Carbon County. Coal helped the region develop and contributed to America's iron and steel industries. The anthracite coal in the region is known as "stone coal" because of its rock-like hardness. Anthracite is created over millions of years as countless layers of sediment compress plant debris from swamps until it becomes hard. The Delaware and Lehigh National Heritage Corridor follows the route stone coal took from mine to market, winding through northern mountains and along the banks of the Lehigh and Delaware Rivers.

In the early to mid-1800s, a lengthy network of locks, canals, and towpaths was built to ship anthracite, further aiding the mining industry's growth. The Lehigh Canal system generated a great deal of industrial development in the form of mining and the accompanying infrastructure. It gave rise to many towns and offshoot businesses, such as timber cutting, sawmills, steel mills, tanneries, etc. The Delaware Canal, on the other hand, was a means of shipping goods and establishing commerce. It supplemented existing overland routes resulting in the lack of an industrial boom along this route. However, the Lehigh and Delaware Canals merged to create part of a grand transportation systems stretching from the Appalachian Mountains to the Atlantic Ocean. In 1862 a massive flood, which destroyed dams, locks, canal boats, and villages, helped to shift the shipping of anthracite coal towards the railroads.

Much like the canals, railroads helped to transport goods and contribute to the development of the region. Asa Packer's Lehigh Valley Railroad, which ran from present-day Jim Thorpe to Easton and on to New York City, was the first rail line to have a significant impact. The Lehigh & Susquehanna Railroad, Reading Railroad, and the Pennsylvania Railroad also moved into the area to create competition for the shipping of coal and goods.

The canals and railroads that serve as the Corridor's backbone once transported coal, lumber, slate, iron, cement, and steel from mountain to market, fueling the Industrial Revolution and supplying downstream industries for more than a century. Of all the products and businesses born out of the coal and transportation connection, none were as significant as Bethlehem Steel, locally known as "The Steel."

=== A National Heritage Area ===
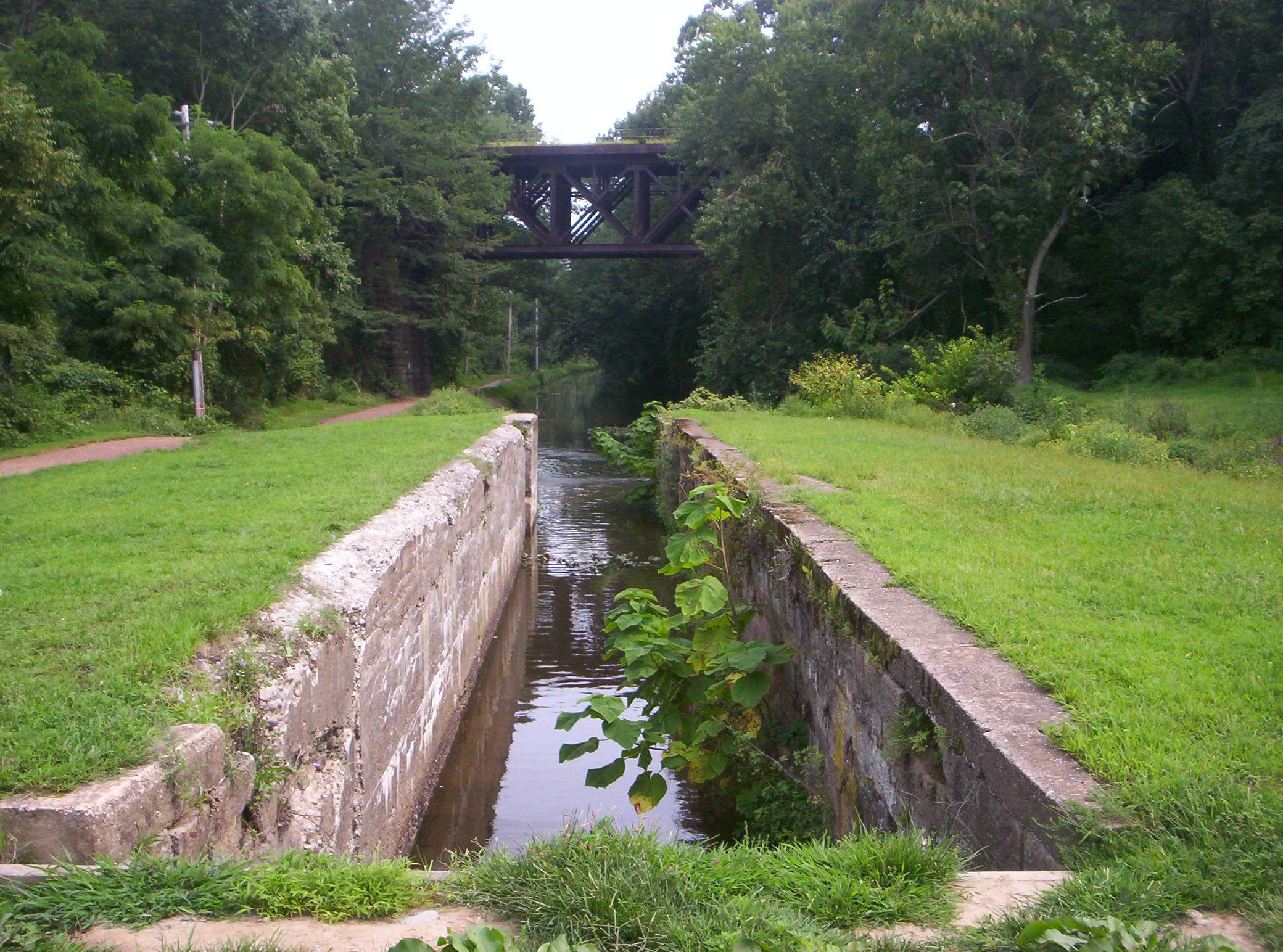
A view of the Delaware Canal with the towpath at left and the rail in the background

In 1988, U.S. Congress designated the Corridor as nationally significant, in recognition of its nine National Historic Landmarks, six National Recreation Trails, two National Natural Landmarks and hundreds of sites listed in the National Register of Historic Places. A National Heritage Area is a region that has been recognized by the United States Congress for its unique qualities and resources. It is a place where a combination of natural, cultural, historic, and recreational resources have shaped a cohesive, nationally distinctive landscape. The Corridor is one of forty-nine federally recognized National Heritage Ages.

Heritage areas allow local communities to cooperate on efforts to preserve the resources that are important to them. This partnership approach to heritage development allows collaboration around a theme, industry, and/or geographical feature that influenced the region's culture and history. This strategy encourages individuals and agencies to prioritized programs and projects that recognize, preserve, and celebrate many of America's defining landscapes.

In 2013, work was completed on 10 miles of trail from White Haven to Mountain Top. This section of the trail is locally known as the Black Diamond Trail. This is the first trail section that leaves the Lehigh River; it replaces abandoned rail beds. A trailhead and parking lot near Mountain Top were also completed. The trailhead is located on land owned by the PA DCNR Bureau of Forestry and the PA Game Commission. Funding was made possible by a $1.2m grant from the Federal Highway Administration through PennDOT.

Gaps in the trail were also filled. A gap was filled at the crossing of State Route 13 in Levittown. Another gap was filled between Riverview Park in Palmer Township and Hugh Moore Park in Easton.

In 2013, the Delaware and Lehigh National Heritage Corridor began operating the National Canal Museum under a management agreement. This marked the beginning of a three-year transition in which the two organizations would become one. The transition allowed DLNHC to integrate the management, finance, marketing, and development functions of the two organizations. The merger of the two in 2017 culminated this transition period. DLNHC is the surviving entity under which the enterprises will operate. The museum, along with the other operations of Hugh Moore Historical Park & Museums, is now the Signature Program of DLNHC. It is located in the Emrick Technology Center in Easton, Pennsylvania's Hugh Moore Park.

== Affiliations ==
The Delaware and Lehigh National Heritage Corridor was recognized as an affiliate of the Smithsonian Institution in 2017. It is the first National Heritage Area to be recognized as a Smithsonian Affiliate.

== See also ==
- National Canal Museum
- National Park Service
- List of mountain biking areas and trails in Pennsylvania
- National Register of Historic Places listings in Pennsylvania
  - in Bucks County
  - in Carbon County
  - in Lehigh County
  - in Luzerne County
  - in Northampton County
