= Lehigh Gorge Trail =

Coordinates: 40.8812°N 75.7629°W

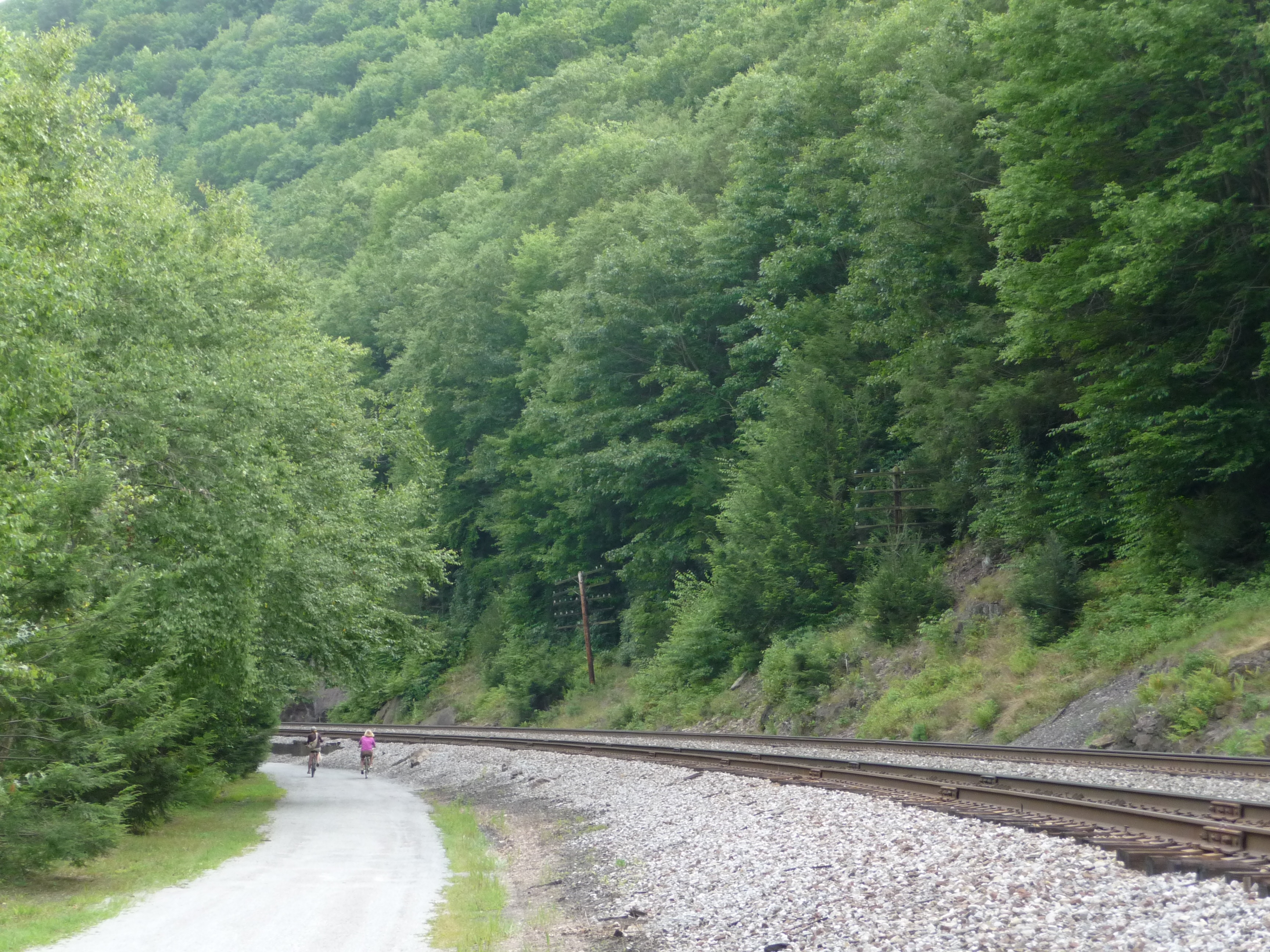
The Lehigh Gorge Trail near Jim Thorpe.

The Lehigh Gorge Trail is a 26-mile (42 km) multi-use rail trail that winds along the valley of the Lehigh River Gorge from White Haven, to Jim Thorpe, Pennsylvania. Much of the trail runs through the Lehigh Gorge State Park, and was originally developed into a railroad corridor after an extension of the Lehigh Canal was first built under the great push of Main Line of Public Works to connect the Delaware Valley to Pittsburgh.

Dating to 1837, the Lehigh Coal & Navigation Company and its subsidiary Lehigh and Susquehanna Railroad (LH&S RR) worked to tame the rough terrains of the gorge, initially for a northward extension of the Lehigh Canal, then for a railroad graded through passing the twists of the gorge after floods in the later-1840s wiped out the northward extension of the much older (lower) Lehigh Canal, extending down to the industries of Allentown and Philadelphia. LH&S became a holding company in the 1870s and to this day lease the trackage of this important rail corridor to several rail companies with track rights, including Norfolk Southern and the Reading Blue Mountain and Northern Railroad. Parts of the trail are rights of ways of the competing Lehigh Valley Railroad (LVRR), incorporated in the 1870s to bust the monopoly the LH&S had over transit between the Delaware Valley and Wilkes-Barre. Both rail systems were acquired during the Conrail mergers, with parts combined for today's Railbed.

The trail is located on the unused remnants, and today is part of the 165-mile (266 km) D & L Trail, which extends northwards along the other abandoned trackage beyond Mountain Top down into the Avoca and Moosic suburbs between Wilkes-Barre and Scranton.

== Activities ==
The Lehigh Gorge Trail has a fine crushed stone surface suitable for hiking and cycling. The 25-mile (40 km) downhill grade from White Haven to Jim Thorpe makes the trail popular with cyclists who use various shuttle services from the Jim Thorpe area to reach the White Haven trail head, for an easy "downhill" pedal.

== Trail access ==
The trail has three primary trailheads, the White Haven and Glen Onoko terminuses and a midway access point in Rockport. A recent 2.1 mile trail connection via the Nesquehoning Trestle between Glen Onoko and Jim Thorpe provides direct access to downtown Jim Thorpe.

== History ==
The trail follows an abandoned railroad corridor along the Lehigh River. Prior to the railroad, the Lehigh Canal ran along much of the same route, and many of the original stone locks are still intact and visible from the trail.
