= National Register of Historic Places listings in Carbon County, Pennsylvania =

Location of Carbon County in Pennsylvania

This is a list of the National Register of Historic Places listings in Carbon County, Pennsylvania.

This is intended to be a complete list of the properties and districts on the National Register of Historic Places in Carbon County, Pennsylvania. The locations of National Register properties and districts for which the latitude and longitude coordinates are included below, may be seen in a map.

There are 16 properties and districts listed on the National Register in the county. Two sites are further designated as National Historic Landmarks.

This National Park Service list is complete through NPS recent listings posted July 18, 2025.

== Current listings ==
	Name on the Register	Image	Date listed	Location	City or town	Description
1	Bowmanstown School		November 25, 2024 (#100011046)	490 Ore Street; 40°47′59″N 75°39′42″W	Bowmanstown	
2	Carbon County Jail	Carbon County Jail	November 8, 1974 (#74001764)	128 Broadway Street; 40°51′50″N 75°44′49″W	Jim Thorpe	John Haviland & Henry Bowman, architects.
3	Carbon County Section of the Lehigh Canal	Carbon County Section of the Lehigh Canal	August 10, 1979 (#79002179)	Along the Lehigh River; 40°49′03″N 75°40′08″W	Bowmanstown, Franklin Township, Jim Thorpe, Lower Towamensing Township, Palmerton, Parryville, and Weissport	Extends into Lehigh Township and Walnutport in Northampton County
4	Central Railroad of New Jersey Station	Central Railroad of New Jersey Station	January 1, 1976 (#76001615)	Susquehanna Street; 40°51′46″N 75°44′19″W	Jim Thorpe	Wilson Brothers & Company, architects.
5	The Grotto-Our Lady of Lourdes Shrine	The Grotto-Our Lady of Lourdes Shrine	September 20, 2019 (#11000923)	15 E. Garibaldi Ave. 40°52′09″N 75°48′55″W	Nesquehoning	
6	Lansford Historic District	Lansford Historic District	September 4, 2012 (#12000605)	Roughly bounded by Snyder Avenue, Cortright, East, and Water Streets; 40°49′53″N 75°53′00″W	Lansford	
7	Little Gap Covered Bridge	Little Gap Covered Bridge	December 1, 1980 (#80004294)	South of Little Gap on Township 376; 40°49′52″N 75°31′22″W	Lower Towamensing Township	
8	Mauch Chunk Cemetery		July 21, 2025 (#100012043)	201 South Avenue; 40°51′58″N 75°44′26″W	Jim Thorpe	
9	Mauch Chunk Switchback Railway	Mauch Chunk Switchback Railway	June 3, 1976 (#76001616)	Between Ludlow Street in Summit Hill and F.A.P. 209 in Jim Thorpe; 40°50′58″N 75°47′46″W	Jim Thorpe, Nesquehoning, and Summit Hill	
10	Nesquehoning High School	Nesquehoning High School	November 21, 2003 (#03001187)	120–124 East Catawissa Street; 40°51′55″N 75°48′35″W	Nesquehoning	
11	Old Mauch Chunk Historic District	Old Mauch Chunk Historic District	November 10, 1977 (#77001134)	Broadway, Susquehanna, Race, and High Streets; 40°51′44″N 75°44′35″W	Jim Thorpe	
12	Asa Packer Mansion	Asa Packer Mansion	December 30, 1974 (#74001765)	Packer Road; 40°51′50″N 75°44′16″W	Jim Thorpe	Attributed to Samuel Sloan, architect.
13	Harry Packer Mansion	Harry Packer Mansion	November 20, 1974 (#74001766)	Packer Road; 40°51′53″N 75°44′17″W	Jim Thorpe	Addison Hutton, architect.
14	Palmerton Historic District	Palmerton Historic District	January 19, 2018 (#13000743)	Roughly bounded by Ave. A, Harvard Ave., 8th & Tomb Sts. 40°48′16″N 75°36′32″W	Palmerton	
15	St. Mark's Episcopal Church	St. Mark's Episcopal Church	July 26, 1977 (#77001135)	Race and Susquehanna Streets; 40°51′46″N 75°44′21″W	Jim Thorpe	Richard Upjohn, architect.
16	Summit Hill High School	Summit Hill High School	February 16, 2001 (#01000138)	124 West Hazard Street; 40°49′34″N 75°52′29″W	Summit Hill	

== See also ==
- List of Pennsylvania state historical markers in Carbon County
