= List of Pennsylvania state historical markers in Carbon County =

Location of Carbon County in Pennsylvania

This is a list of the Pennsylvania state historical markers in Carbon County.

This is intended to be a complete list of the official state historical markers placed in Carbon County, Pennsylvania by the Pennsylvania Historical and Museum Commission (PHMC). The locations of the historical markers, as well as the latitude and longitude coordinates as provided by the PHMC's database, are included below when available. There are 11 historical markers located in Carbon County.

== Historical markers ==
Marker title	Image	Date dedicated	Location	Marker type	Topics
Carbon County		June 13, 1982	County Courthouse, Broadway & Susquehanna Sts., Jim Thorpe; 40.8637°N 75.73802°W	City	Environment, Government & Politics, Government & Politics 19th Century, Native American
Fort Allen		July 14, 1947	U.S. 209 in Franklin Twp. (near Weissport), near Wachovia Bank; 40.83081°N 75.69591°W	Roadside	Forts, French & Indian War, Military
Fort Allen Well		May 25, 1971	Weisport Borough Park opposite 112-116 Franklin St., Weissport; 40.82966°N 75.70248°W	City	French & Indian War, Environment, Forts, Military
Gnadenhuetten		May 25, 1971	Penn Street in Lehighton, just north of Boro. Garage	Roadside	Early Settlement, Native American, Religion
Molly Maguire Executions		September 9, 2006	at Old Carbon County Jail, Broadway, Jim Thorpe	Roadside	Business & Industry, Coal, Government & Politics 19th Century, Labor
Packer Mansion		May 14, 1971	Susquehanna St. (US 209) at park near railroad station, Jim Thorpe; 40.86324°N 75.73777°W	Roadside	Buildings, Mansions & Manors, Professions & Vocations
Philip Ginter		May 27, 1991	Ludlow Park on E Penn St., Summit Hill; 40.8244°N 75.87324°W	City	Business & Industry, Coal
Switchback Railroad		May 25, 1971	SR 3012, 3 miles SW of Jim Thorpe; 40.8438°N 75.80616°W	Roadside	Railroads, Transportation
Walking Purchase		May 25, 1971	Interchange Rd.(US 209) near Rock St. and Main Rd., 1.5 miles E of Weissport; 40.8386°N 75.67585°W	Roadside	Government & Politics, Government & Politics 18th Century, Native American, Paths & Trails
Walking Purchase		April 22, 1948	PA 903 near Maury Rd. (SR 2017), 2 miles NE of Jim Thorpe; 40.89526°N 75.69046°W	Roadside	Government & Politics, Government & Politics 18th Century, Native American
Walking Purchase		April 22, 1949	Pa. 903, 2 miles NE of Jim Thorpe	Roadside	Government & Politics, Government & Politics 17th Century, Native American

== See also ==
- List of Pennsylvania state historical markers
- National Register of Historic Places listings in Carbon County, Pennsylvania
