= Mauch Chunk Opera House =

Theatre in Jim Thorpe, Pennsylvania

Coordinates: 40°51′52″N 75°44′31″W

- Industry: Arts and entertainment
- Predecessor: Capitol Theater
- Founded: 1881
- Founder: Addison Hutton
- Headquarters: Jim Thorpe, Pennsylvania, United States
- Website: https://mcohjt.com/

The Mauch Chunk Opera House, formerly known as the Capitol Theater, is a theatre in Jim Thorpe, Pennsylvania in the United States.

Built in 1881 by architect Addison Hutton on "millionaires row" in the former community known as Mauch Chunk, the cornerstone was laid on August 10, 1881. The theater then officially opened its doors to patrons in 1882.

== History ==
Originally designed as a nine hundred-seat concert hall with a farmers' market on the first floor, the Mauch Chunk Opera House was one of the earliest Vaudeville theaters in America, and was managed earlier on by W. D. White, who was succeeded in 1886 by Moses H. Burgunder (1852-1900), a native of Wilkes-Barre, Pennsylvania who achieved fame for his management of entertainment venues across northeastern Pennsylvania, including the Wilkes-Barre Music Hall. Although Burgunder initially had difficult relations with the owners of the opera house, patrons of the house were highly supportive of him, giving him standing ovations at the beginning of multiple sold-out shows, including Fogg's Ferry in which Lizzie Evans, "the Little Electric Battery," starred in January 1886.

During the mid-1890s, Harry Faga, the town's former burgess was the lease holder and treasurer of the opera house. On May 26, 1894, the Beethoven Maennerchor of Bethlehem performed in an evening concert at the opera house, which also served as a venue for political rallies during this era.

Celebrities appearing there included Mae West, Al Jolson, John Philip Sousa, and Eddie Foy Sr. The last film to ever be shown at the opera house under its original name was Tell It to the Marines, on July 5, 1927. That month, Mauch Chunk resident Howard DeHart achieved the distinction of being the person to buy the first and last tickets of the house, which had been purchased earlier that year by the Comerford Amusement chain. Remodeled by the company that summer, the opera house was then subsequently renamed as the Capitol Theater and reopened for business.

Used as a movie house during the early silent screen era, it gradually declined in popularity, and was sold in 1962 to a local purse factory, which used it as a warehouse Abandoned in the mid-1970s, it was purchased from Yannis Simonides and Billy Padgett of Brooklyn, New York for $5,300 on November 30, 1977 by members of the recently formed Mauch Chunk Historical Society and other local citizens of Jim Thorpe (the new name chosen for their town after it had been reincorporated). The Historical Society oversaw its remodeling and then reopened it in time for its centennial celebration in 1981. It went on to become a popular venue for holiday events, a "haunted theater" and other local productions. In 2003, area residents Vincent DeGiosio and Christine McGorry Degiosio, and businessman and gallery owner Daniel Hugos refurbished the theater again, and then booked new entertainment acts. Presently, the Mauch Chunk Opera House has a capacity of roughly four hundred seats.

== See also ==
- Old Mauch Chunk Historic District
