= Old Mauch Chunk Historic District =

Historic district in Pennsylvania, United States

- U.S. National Register of Historic Places
- U.S. Historic district
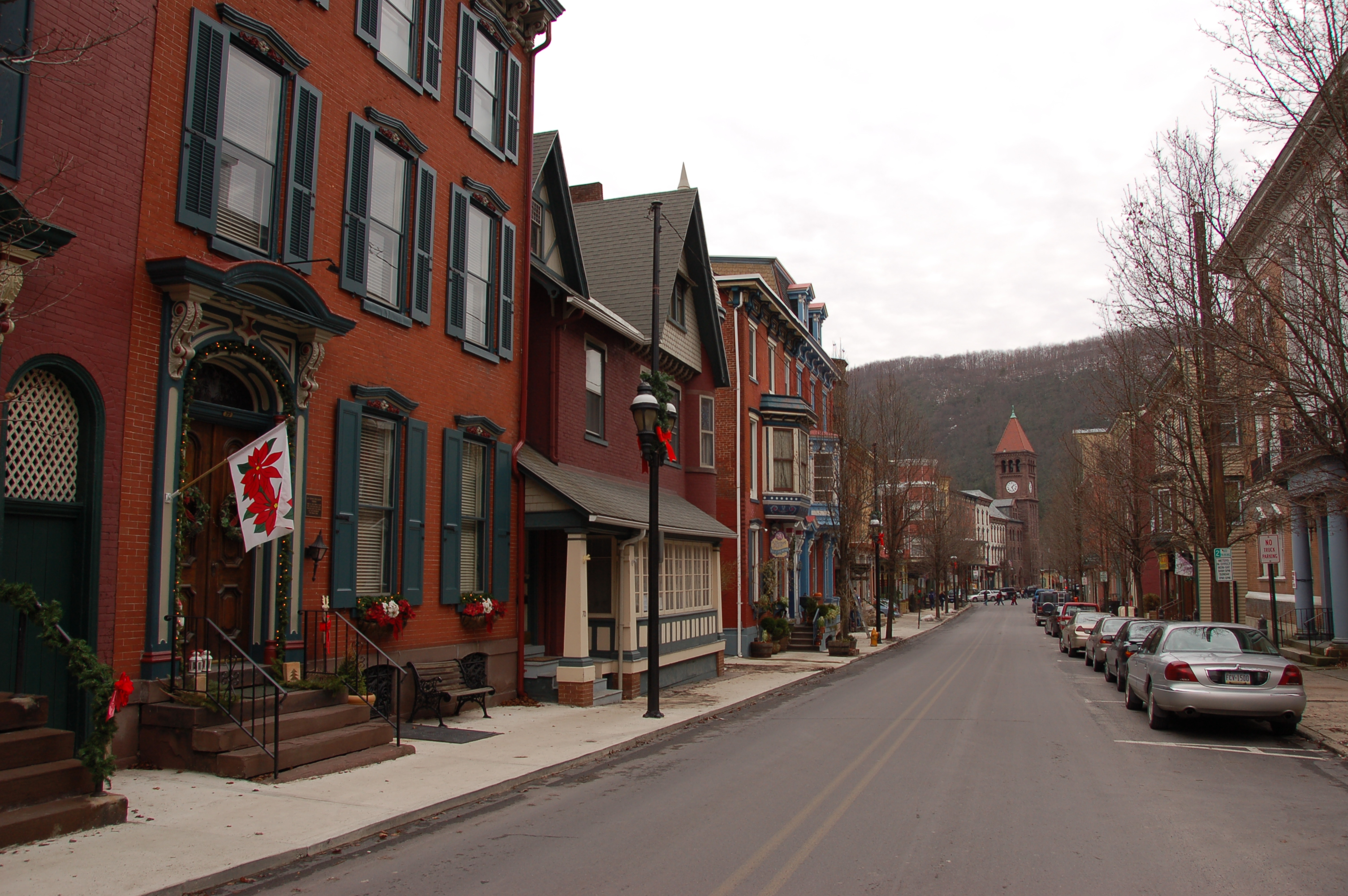
- Jim Thorpe Broadway Buildings, December 2007

- Location within Pennsylvania Location within the United States
- Location: Broadway, Susquehanna, Race, and High Streets, Jim Thorpe, Pennsylvania
- Coordinates: 40°51′44″N 75°44′35″W
- Area: 101.7 acres (41.2 ha)
- Architect: Hutton, Addison; Multiple
- Architectural style: Italianate
- NRHP reference No.: 77001134
- Added to NRHP: November 10, 1977

The Old Mauch Chunk Historic District is a national historic district located in Jim Thorpe, Carbon County, Pennsylvania.

The district includes 28 contributing buildings in the central business district of Jim Thorpe. It includes residential and commercial buildings in a number of popular architectural styles, including Italianate. The original town was laid out in 1831 by noted civil engineer John A. Roebling. Notable buildings include Mauch Chunk Museum and Cultural Center (1843), the I.O.O.F. Hall (1844), Lehigh Coal and Navigation Building (1882), Jim Thorpe National Bank (1870s), Carbon County Courthouse (1894), Dimmick Memorial Library (1889), Capitol Theater (Mauch Chunk Opera House) (1882), 1855 School, Weiksner's Taproom (1860s), "Stone Row," Webster House, New American Hotel, and Hooven Mercantile Building. Located in the district and listed separately are the Asa Packer Mansion, Harry Packer Mansion, Carbon County Jail, Central Railroad of New Jersey Station, and St. Mark's Episcopal Church.

It was listed on the National Register of Historic Places in 1977.

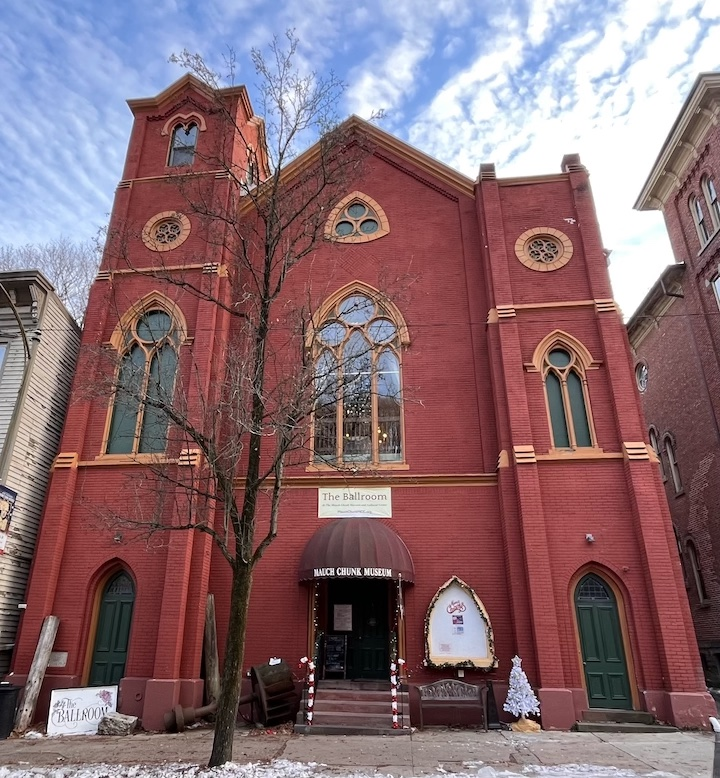
Mauch Chunk Museum and Cultural Center

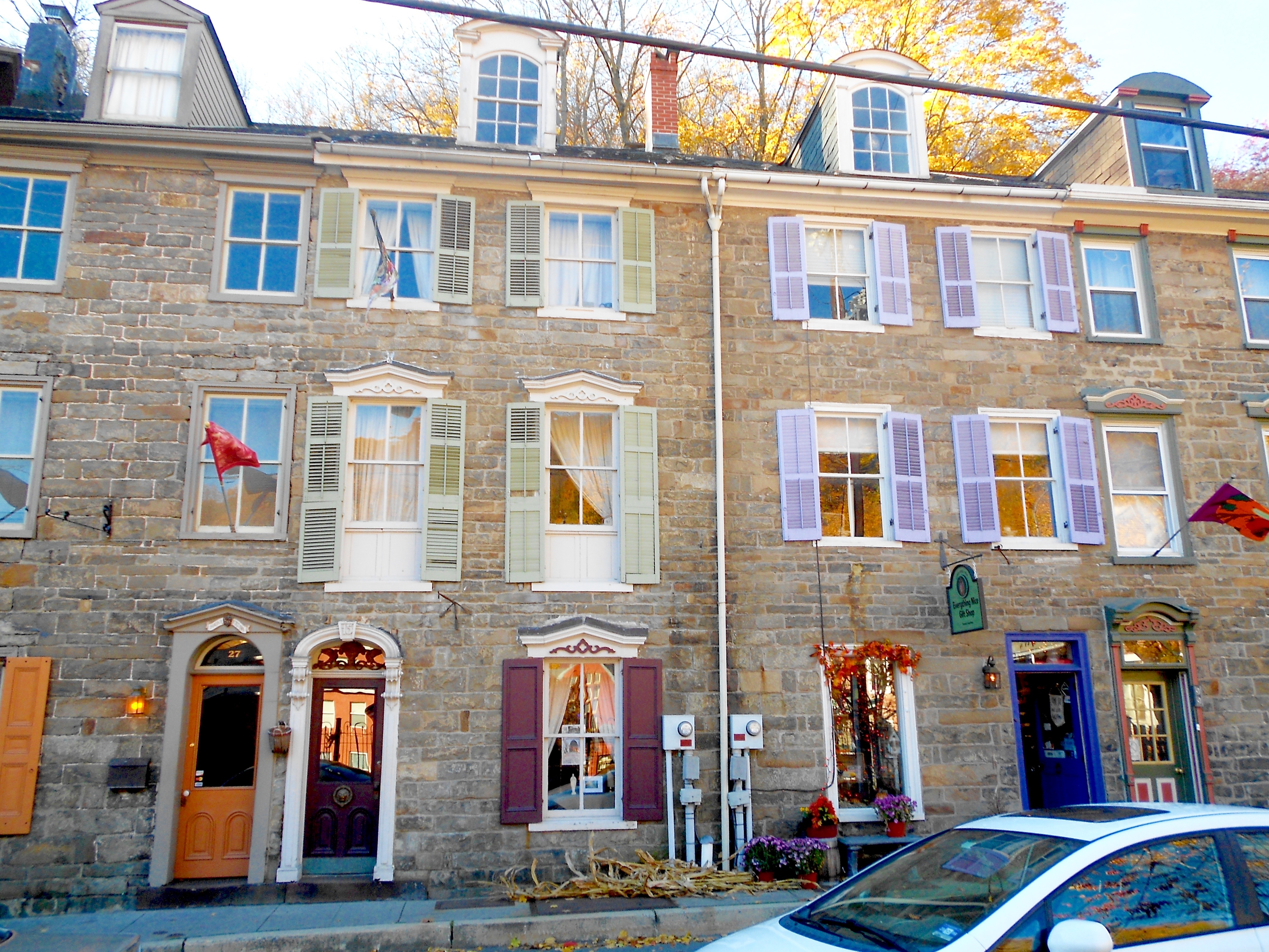
Stone Row

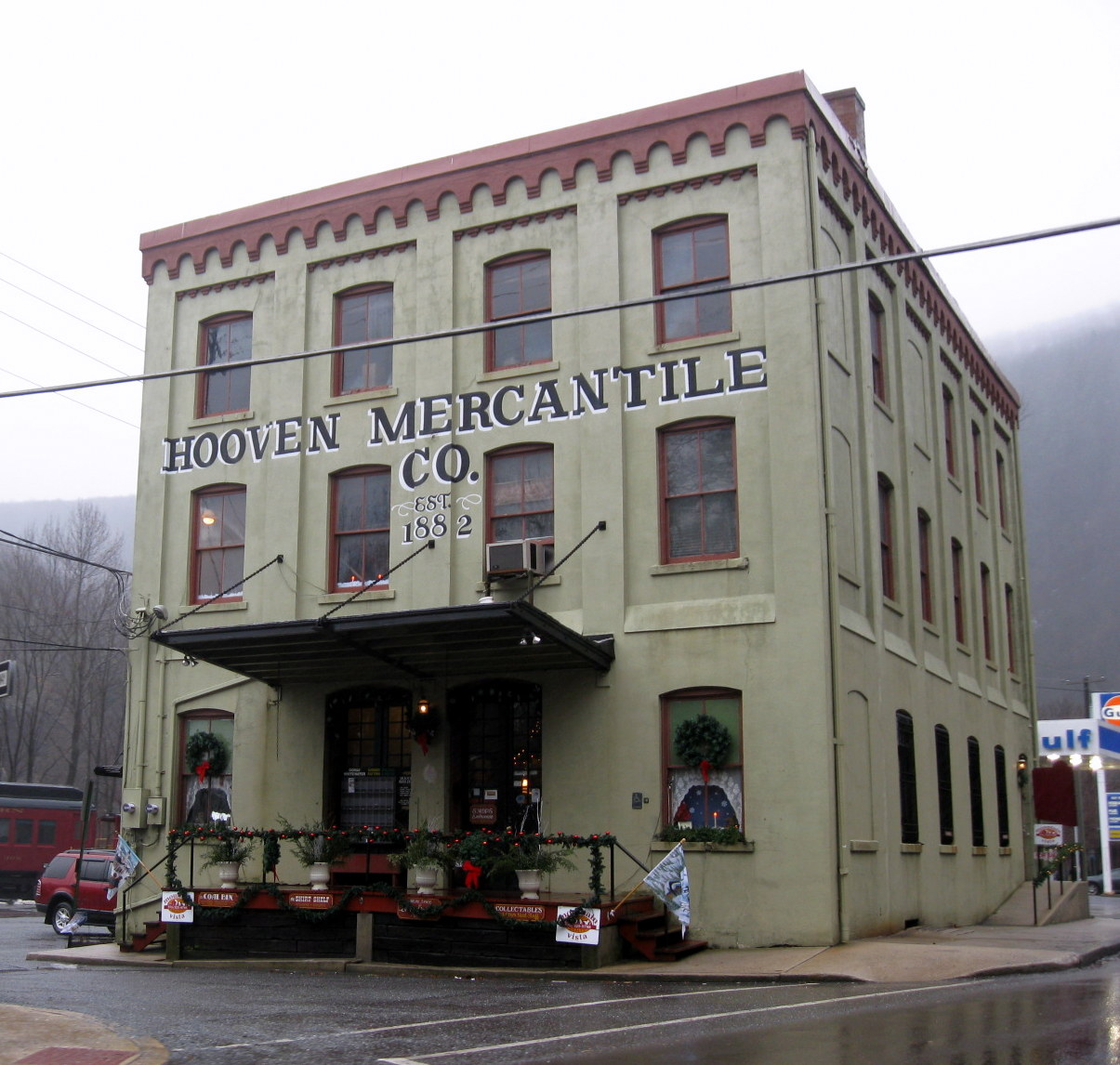
Hooven Mercantile Building

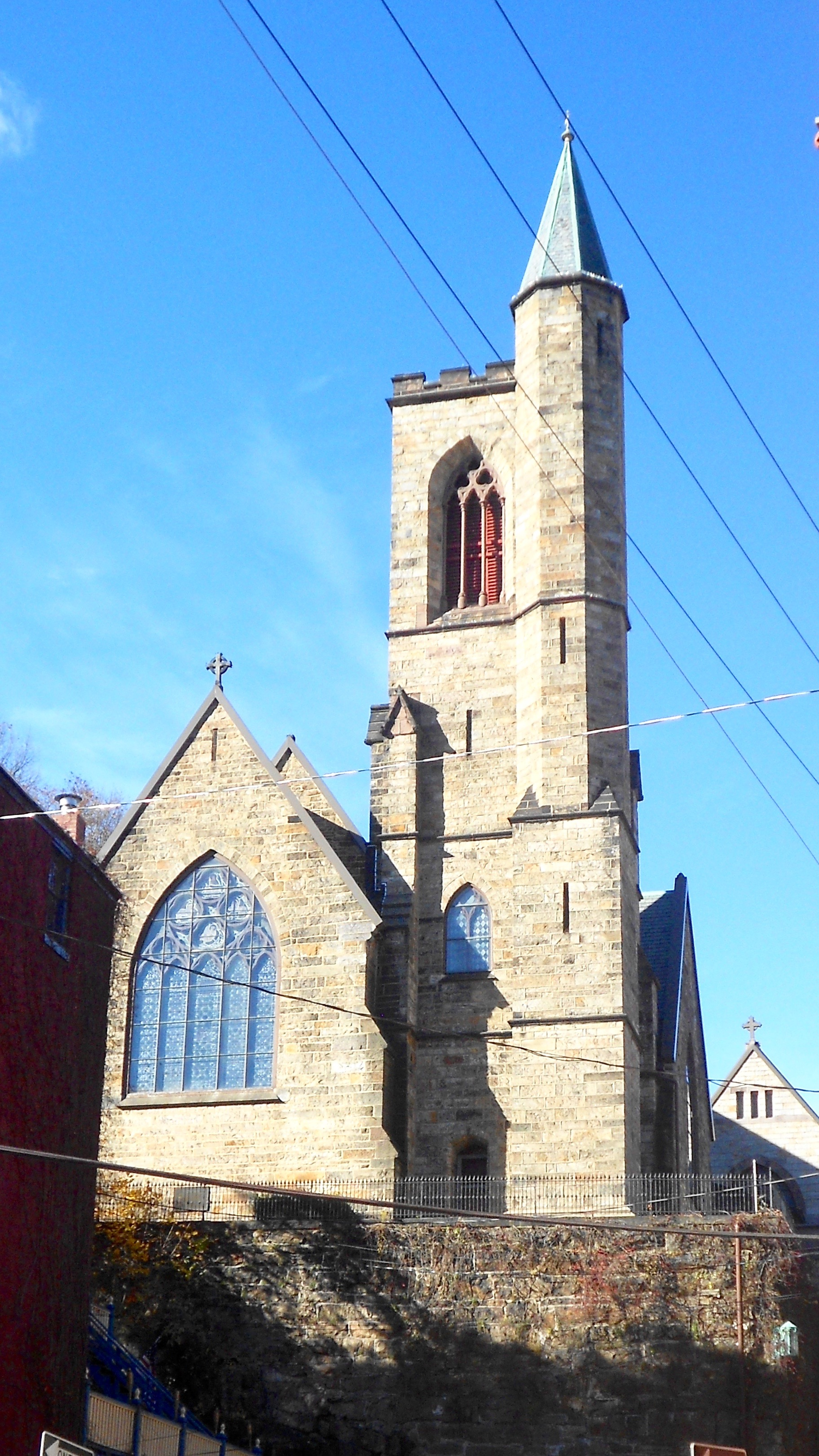
St. Mark's Episcopal Church

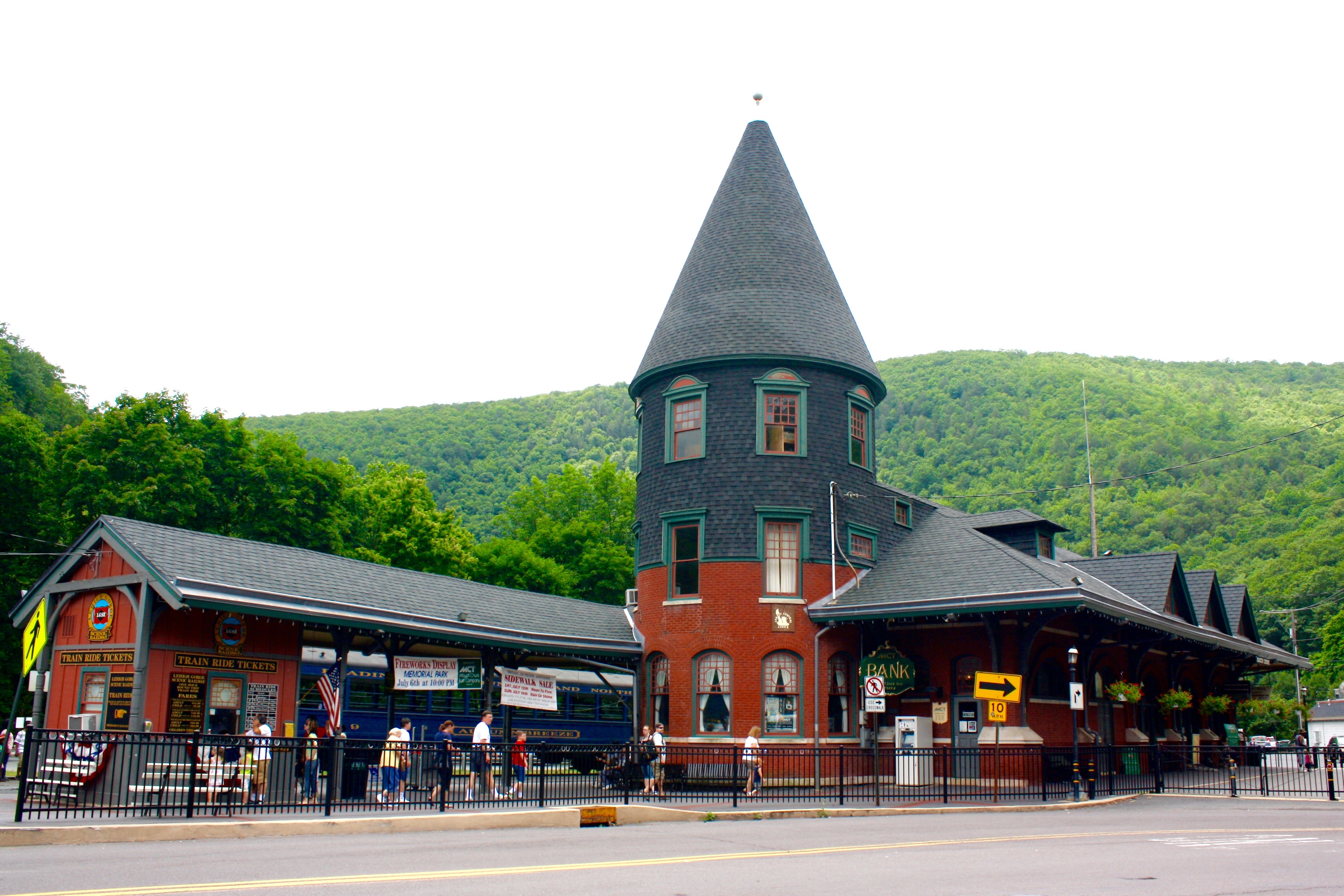
Central Railroad of New Jersey Station
