= Edward Fister =

Edward J. Fister was born in Mauch Chunk (now Jim Thorpe) Pennsylvania on October 1, 1911. He died at home in New Jersey on February 8, 2003. He was a pioneer in the development of radar, worked on the electrification of the GG-1, and worked on the rocket and bomb proximity fuse.

== Life ==
Edward Fister was born to William Franklin Fister and Hannah Dugan Fister. He was their only surviving child. After growing up in Atlantic City, he graduated from Villanova University in 1937 with a bachelor's degree in electrical engineering. He was awarded the Villanova Alumni Medal. He also was awarded the Westinghouse Science Award. His first job was with the Pennsylvania Railroad in Altoona, Pennsylvania on the electrification project to support the world's fastest engine, the GG-1. After briefly working with the Atlantic City Electric Company, he began to work in 1940 with the Signal Corps in the pre-war years. He eventually became Director of Development at the Signal Corps Engineering Laboratories(called CECOM now). He had worked there for 34 years when he retired in 1974. He worked diligently on the then-new and revolutionary invention, radar.

Fister was responsible for making the inventions of the laboratory and theoretical breakthroughs come to life and onto the battlefield. His work on this was inconceivably important, considering that radar was what helped Britain win the Battle of Britain.

The War Department awarded him the Commendation for Meritorious Civilian Service and the Citation reads: For outstanding performance of assigned tasks and for initiative in directing and expediting engineering work performed by the Signal Corps on the rocket and bomb proximity fuse." signed by Major General H.C. Engles, Chief Signal Office. He was also Officially commended for "A special act in recognition of the outstanding accomplishment of a special one-time assignment received from the Commanding General, US Army Electronics Command, to "expedite and facilitate the USAECOM accomplishment of the FY-66 and prior fiscal year Electronic Warfare program." The assignment was outside the normal sphere of the employee's responsibility but, nevertheless, was performed with the highest degree of knowledgeability, competence, and urgency, and resulted in expressions of appreciation from the Commanding General, USAECOM, and the Commanding General, U.S. Army Security Agency." January 16, 1967 signed by W. B. Latta Major General, USA, Commanding US Army Electronics Command Fort Monmouth, New Jersey.
