= Carbon County Jail =

- U.S. National Register of Historic Places
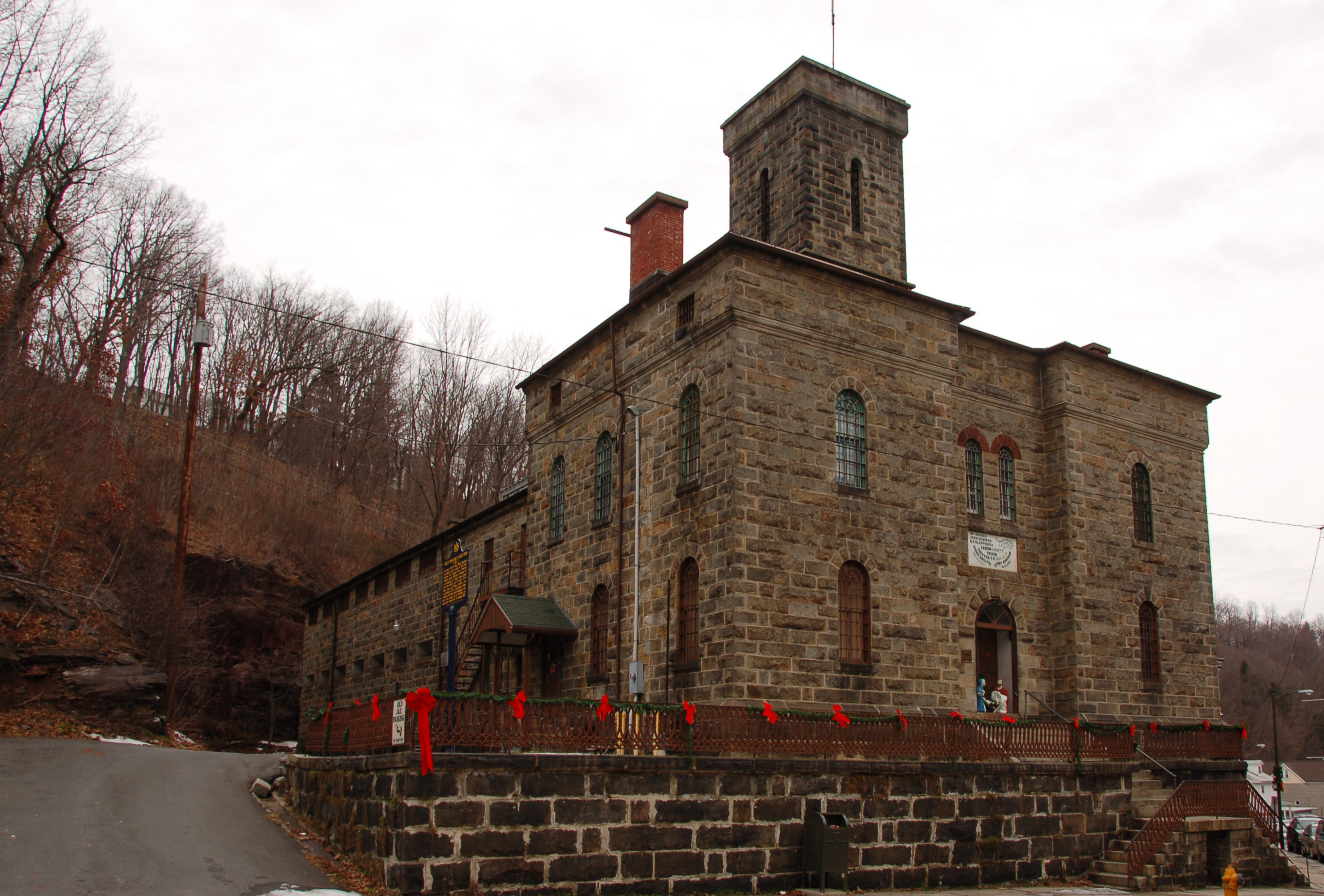
- Carbon County Jail, December 2007

- Location within Pennsylvania Location within the United States
- Location: 128 Broadway Street, Jim Thorpe, Pennsylvania
- Coordinates: 40°51′50″N 75°44′49″W
- Area: 4.9 acres (2.0 ha)
- Built: 1869–1870
- Built by: Henry Bowman
- Architect: Edward Haviland
- NRHP reference No.: 74001764
- Added to NRHP: November 8, 1974

The Carbon County Jail is a historic jail located in Jim Thorpe, Carbon County, Pennsylvania.

It was added to the National Register of Historic Places on November 8, 1974. It is located in the Old Mauch Chunk Historic District.

== History ==
The jail was built in 1869–1870 by Harry Bowman (under architect Edward Haviland) and is a two-story, fortress-like rusticated stone building. It has thick, massive walls and a square, one-story guard turret above the main entrance. It features arched windows on the main facade and on the turret. There is a basement which was used for solitary confinement until 1980. The building is most notable as the jail where a number of suspected "Molly Maguires" were imprisoned while awaiting trial in 1875–1876 and subsequently hanged.

On January 23, 1995, following the completion and opening of the new $8.2 million Carbon County Correctional Facility in Nesquehoning, the prisoners were transferred out of the jail to the new facility.

== Museum ==
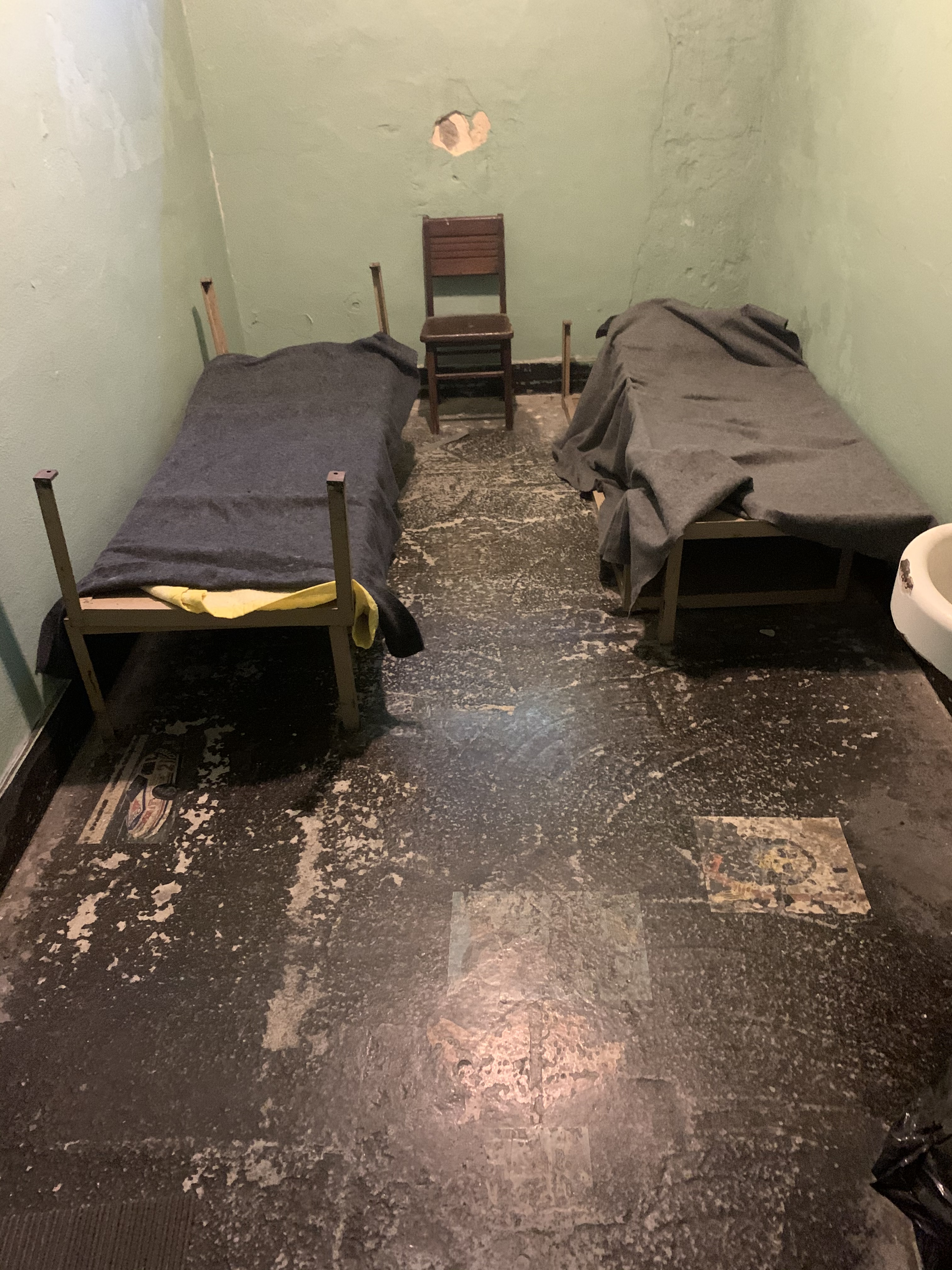
A typical jail cell of the time as seen in the Old Jail Museum

When the county put the jail up for sale in the fall of 1994, local residents Thomas McBride and wife Betty Lou purchased the building for $160,000 with the goal of preserving the local history. The building is now operated as the Old Jail Museum with seasonal tours. In cell 17, there is a handprint left by Alexander Campbell, a "Molly Maguire" who was hanged in 1877, to proclaim his innocence. Legend has it that despite many attempts to remove it, including building a new wall, the mark still remains today.

== See also ==
- National Register of Historic Places listings in Carbon County, Pennsylvania
- Murder of workers in labor disputes in the United States
- Coal and Iron Police
