= Carbon County Courthouse =

Courthouse in Jim Thorpe, Pennsylvania, US

Coordinates: 40.863723°N 75.738101°W

The Carbon County Courthouse, located in Jim Thorpe, Pennsylvania, was built on April 27, 1893. The winning bid went to the architect Herman Riebe at a cost of 81,250 dollars.

== Opening ==
The completed courthouse was opened in May 1894. This was to be the main courthouse for Carbon County and the 3rd such courthouse for the town itself. It was based on the design of the Big Ben Clock tower in London, England. Many of the features inside the courthouse featured many ornate pieces including: fireplaces, vaulted ceilings, stained glass, ornate English Wainscoting, adamant wall plaster and Mintons Tile that ordained the hallways. The exterior was based on the Romanesque architecture revival and sandstone from Rockport, in Northern Carbon County. The brass bell in the tower was cast at McShane Bell Foundry Baltimore, Maryland from an earlier cast in 1844 weighing in at 2,122 lbs. Before this present day courthouse for the county seat, there was the 1st courthouse, which was basically the converted Company Store Building or "Old Store". Donated over to the town itself from the founders of the Lehigh Coal and Navigation Company, it was revamped into a courthouse in 1843. Housing the county row offices on the 1st floor and the courtroom on the 2nd Floor.

== Fire ==
From Dec. 8, 1843 to the devastating fire of July 15, 1849, it served the public; and the court documents that were recovered were then to be put into the 2nd Court House. The 2nd Court House was started in 1850. It was February 8, 1850 that construction started with the Blay & Root Contractors of PA. The courthouse was designed like in the style of a Greek Revival Building. Completing work in November 1850, the first trial was set on December 30, 1850, by Judge Eldred. The most famous of all court cases heard here was the court case of the Molly Maguires from 1876 to 1878. Due to inadequacy and inefficiency from population of the county, which was nearing 40 thousand at his time, this 2nd courthouse was dismantled and the present day 3rd court house was built on the present site today.
