= Asa Packer Mansion =

Historic house in Pennsylvania, United States

- U.S. National Register of Historic Places
- U.S. National Historic Landmark
- U.S. Historic district – Contributing property
- Pennsylvania state historical marker
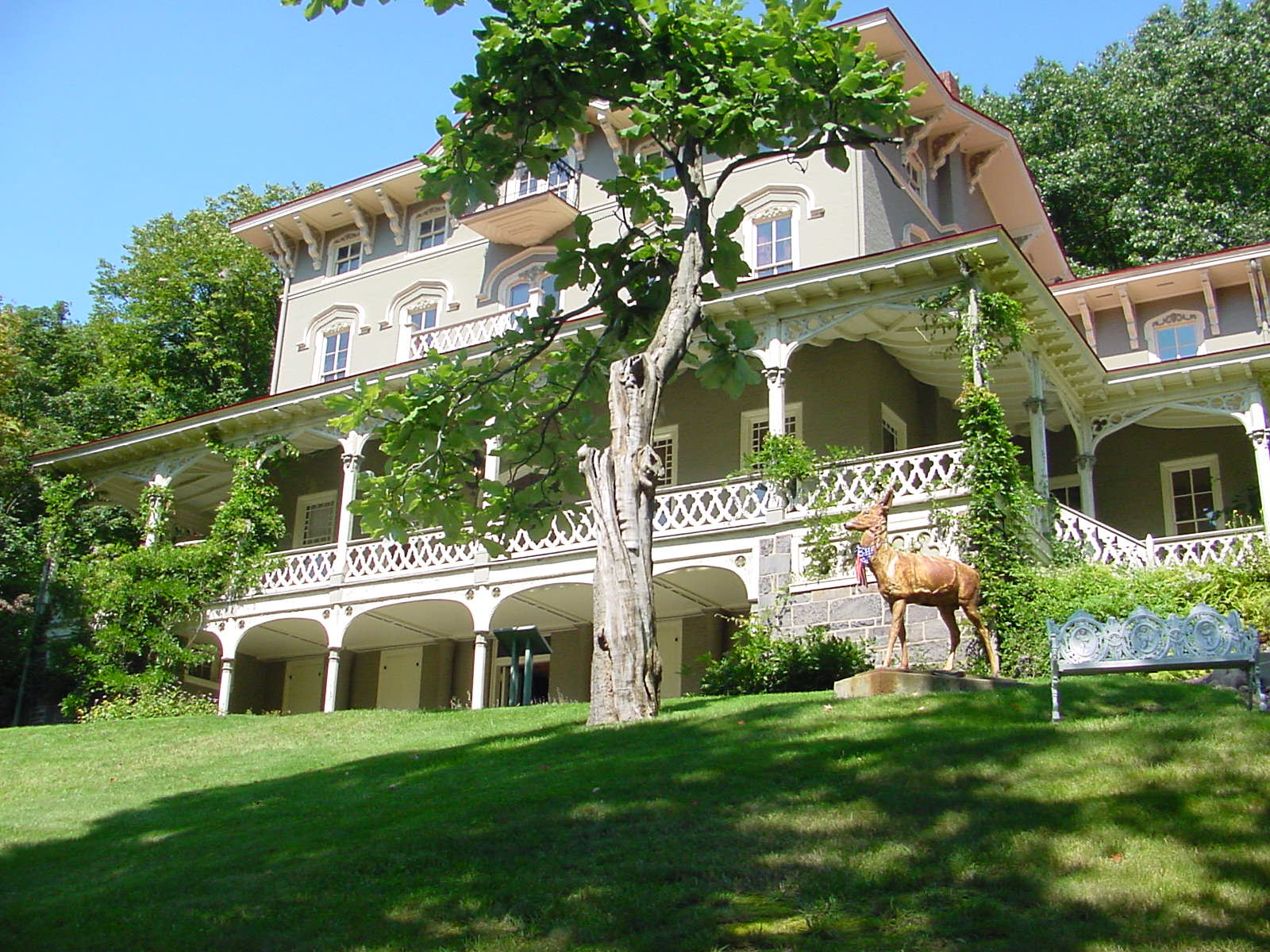
- Asa Packer Mansion, September 2004

- Location within Pennsylvania Location within the United States
- Location: Packer Hill Ave., Jim Thorpe, Pennsylvania
- Coordinates: 40°51′52″N 75°44′18″W
- Built: 1861
- Architect: Samuel Sloan
- Architectural style: Italianate
- Part of: Old Mauch Chunk Historic District (ID77001134)
- NRHP reference No.: 74001765

Significant dates
- Added to NRHP: December 30, 1974
- Designated NHL: February 4, 1985
- Designated CP: November 10, 1977
- Designated PHMC: May 14, 1971

The Asa Packer Mansion is a historic house museum on Packer Road in Jim Thorpe, Pennsylvania, United States. Completed in 1861, it was the home of Asa Packer (1805–1879), a coal and railroad magnate, philanthropist, and founder of Lehigh University. Asa Packer was also a major contributor in the Lehigh Valley Railroad system. The mansion is one of the best preserved Italianate Villa homes in the United States, with original Victorian furnishings and finishes. It was designated a National Historic Landmark in 1985.

== Description ==
The Asa Packer Mansion is located near Jim Thorpe's historic downtown Broadway area, on a terrace overlooking the Lehigh River on the west side of Packer Hill Avenue. The home of Packer's son, the Harry Packer Mansion, designed by Sloan's protegee Addison Hutton, is next door on the same road. The Asa Packer Mansion was built over a cast iron frame and cost $14,000. It contains a total of three stories, 18 rooms, a red-ribbed tin roof, and a two-story covered porch. Both the main roof and porch roof have extended eaves with brackets, and the main roof is capped by a cupola. The main three-story block is extended to either side by smaller blocks ending in bowed segments. The porch has elaborate Italianate details, including arched valances with lacework in the spandrels, and lacework balustrades on the second floor. The interior is also lavishly appointed, retaining original woodwork, features and period furnishings.

== History ==
Packer commissioned it to be built in what was then the Borough of Mauch Chunk. It was completed in 1861. The architect was Samuel Sloan of Philadelphia who also designed the Southern Mansion Hotel in Cape May, New Jersey, and Longwood in Natchez, Mississippi. It took Sloan approximately two years to complete the 11,000 square foot mansion. The house bears a strong resemblance to a design published by Sloan in his 1852 Model Architect, in which he promoted the Italian Villa style. The mansion is embellished with marble fireplaces and gilded mirrors, mostly added for the Packers' Golden Wedding Anniversary on January 23, 1878. The mansion is also filled with many distinct details including Gothic gingerbread trefoil motifs and window arches, and exquisitely carved panelling. The original furnishings are reflective of the Packer's wealth and remains as part of the preservation of the mansion.

== Museum ==
Upon the death of Mary Packer Cummings, Mr. Packer's daughter (who could not inherit his estate unless she entered into an arranged marriage) in 1912, the home was willed to the Borough of Mauch Chunk to remain as a memorial to her father and his many accomplishments. The borough, not certain what to do with the home, closed it, and for 44 years the home sat idle. The Jim Thorpe Lions Club, looking to sponsor a new community project, approached the borough about opening the home. It was opened for tours on Memorial Day of 1956.

The home is owned by the town of Jim Thorpe and financially controlled by the Jim Thorpe Lions Club. Ronald J Sheehan serves as executive director of the Mansion Museum as is in charge of overall administration of the National Historic Landmark property.

It was listed on the National Register of Historic Places in 1974, and was further declared a National Historic Landmark in 1985. It is located in the Old Mauch Chunk Historic District.

The Museum is open seven days a week from Memorial Day to October 31. It is also open on weekends in April, May, November, and the first three weekends in December.

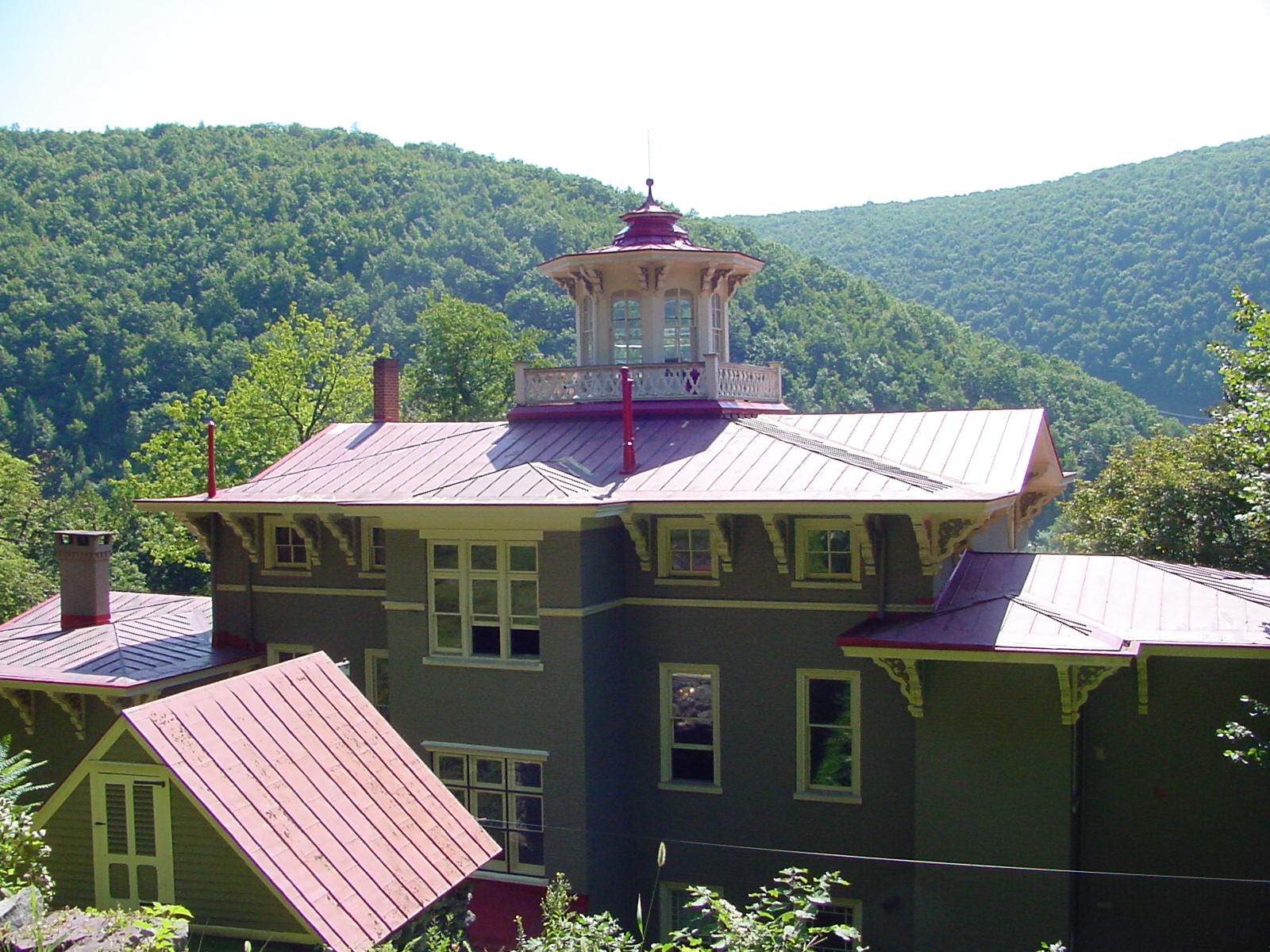
Rear View

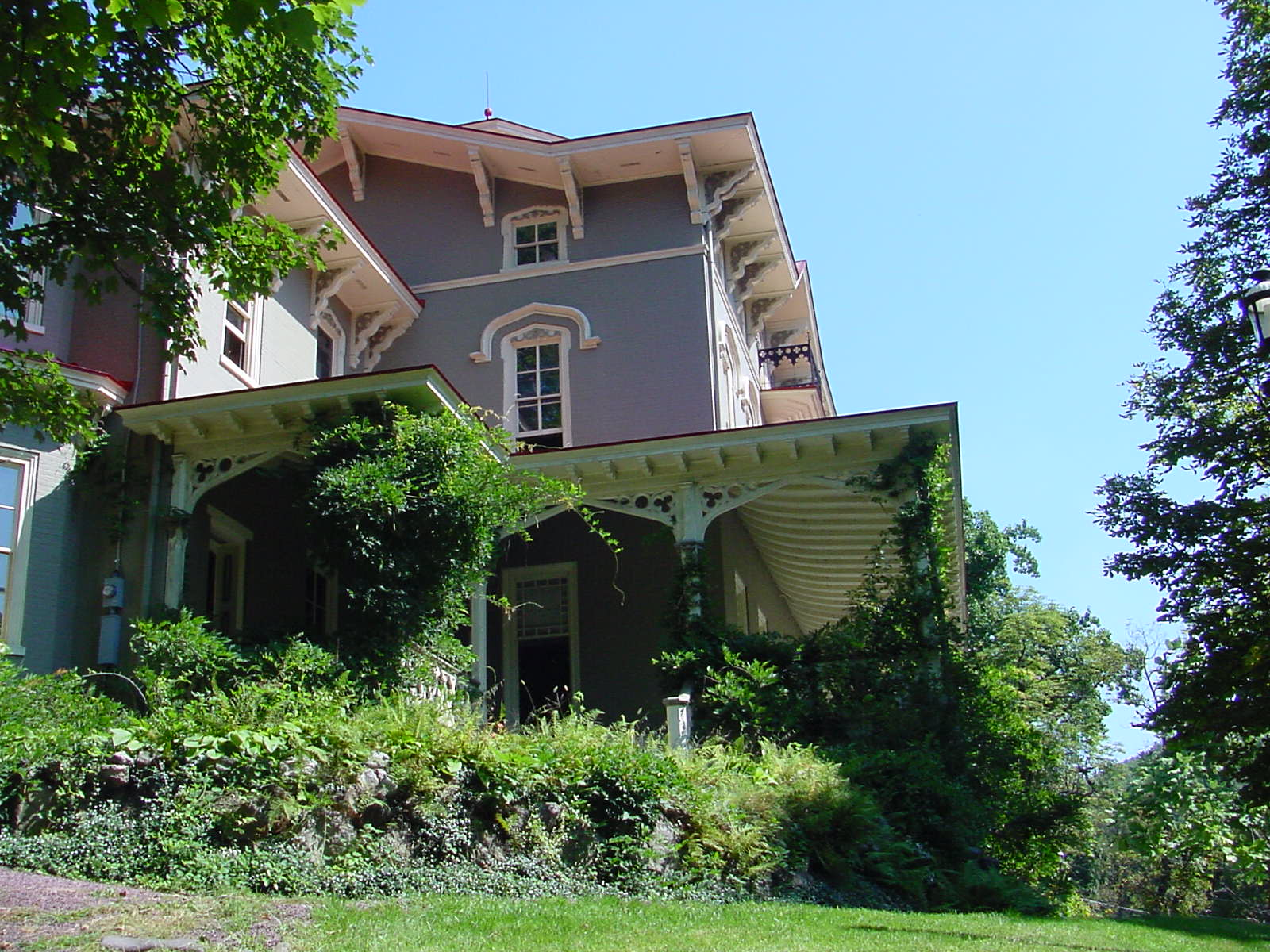
Side View

== See also ==
- List of National Historic Landmarks in Pennsylvania
- National Register of Historic Places listings in Carbon County, Pennsylvania
