= Harry Packer Mansion =

Historic house in Pennsylvania, United States

- U.S. National Register of Historic Places
- U.S. Historic district – Contributing property
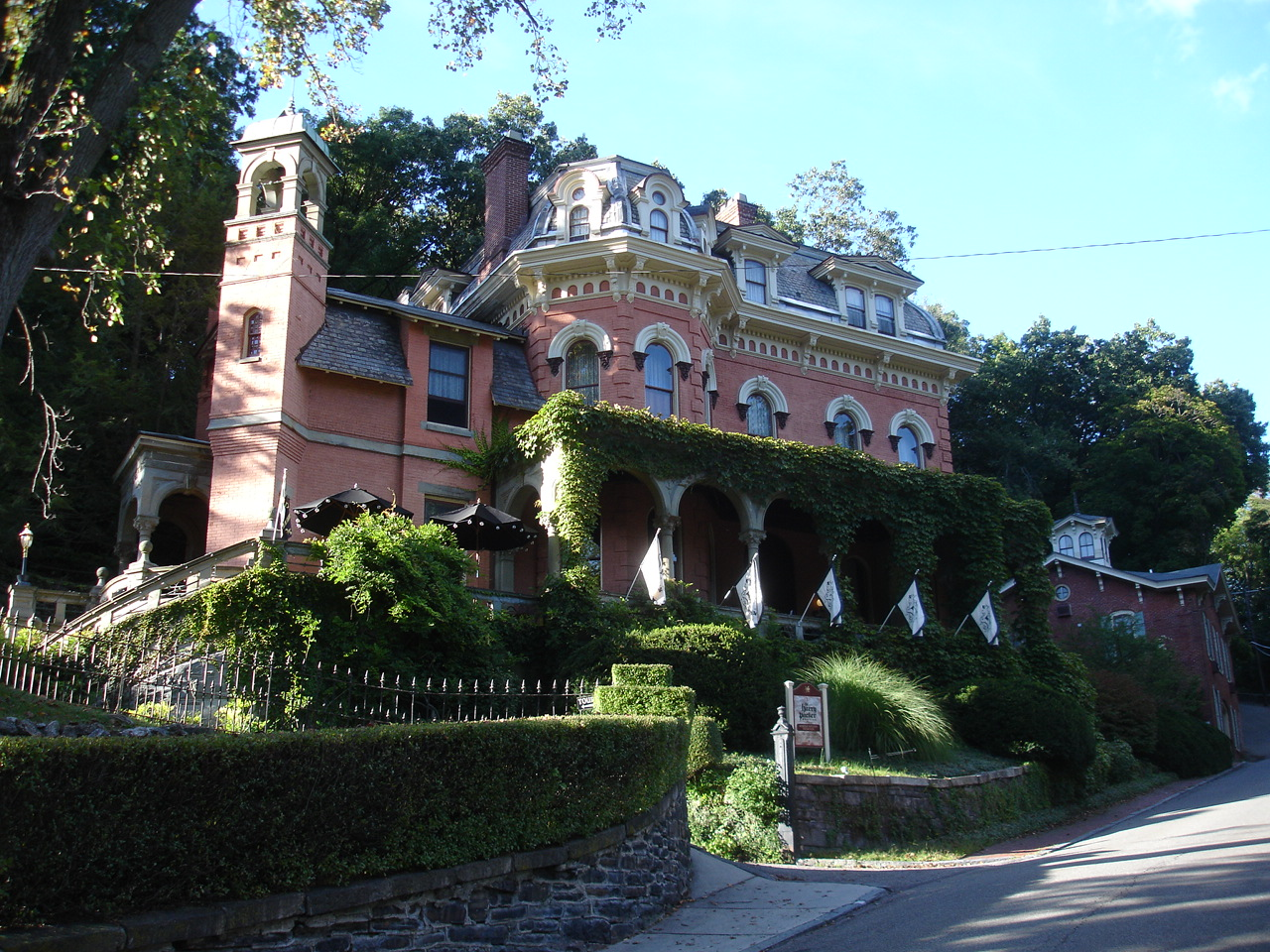

- Location within Pennsylvania Location within the United States
- Location: Packer Road, Jim Thorpe, Pennsylvania
- Coordinates: 40°51′53″N 75°44′17″W
- Area: 5 acres (2.0 ha)
- Built: 1874
- Architect: Addison Hutton
- Architectural style: Italianate,
- Part of: Old Mauch Chunk Historic District (ID77001134)
- NRHP reference No.: 74001766

Significant dates
- Added to NRHP: November 20, 1974
- Designated CP: November 10, 1977

The Harry Packer Mansion, is a historic home which is located in Jim Thorpe, Carbon County, Pennsylvania, United States.

Located in the Old Mauch Chunk Historic District, this residence was added to the National Register of Historic Places on November 20, 1974.

== History and architectural features ==
The mansion was designed by architect Addison Hutton, and was built in 1874. It is a 2 1/2-story, three-bay-wide, red-brick dwelling, which was designed in the Italianate style. The front facade features a verandah constructed of green Vermont sandstone and a bell tower that is attached to the two-story extension. It was given as a wedding gift to Harry Eldred Packer from his father Asa Packer.

== In popular culture ==
The mansion appeared in the season five episode of Fetch! with Ruff Ruffman, "Ruffman Manor is Haunted," and was used as the setting for Ruffman Manor.

The exterior of the Harry Packer Mansion in Jim Thorpe was the inspiration for the Haunted Mansion ride at Disney World.

== See also ==
- National Register of Historic Places listings in Carbon County, Pennsylvania
