= Mauch Chunk station (Central Railroad of New Jersey) =

Historic railroad station in Jim Thorpe, PA

Mauch Chunk
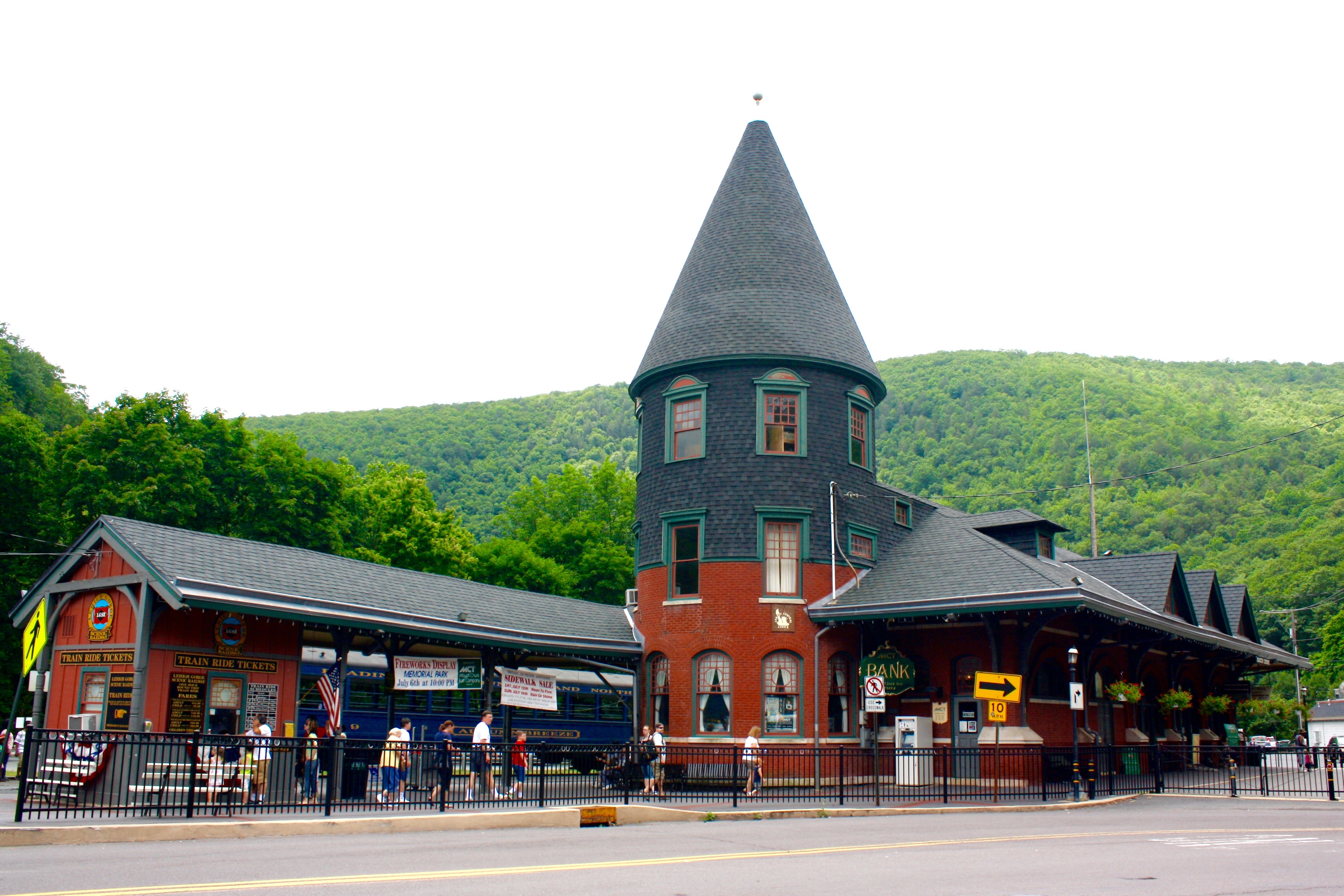
- Central Railroad of New Jersey station

General information
- Location: 1 Susquehanna Street, Jim Thorpe, Pennsylvania
- Coordinates: 40°51′46″N 75°44′19″W
- System: Central Railroad of New Jersey station
- Owner: Carbon County
- Lines: Central Railroad of New Jersey: Lehigh and Susquehanna Division
- Tracks: 2
- Connections: Lehigh Gorge Scenic Railway

Construction
- Structure type: Railroad Station
- Platform levels: 1
- Parking: Yes
- Accessible: No

History
- Opened: 1888, re-opened 1983
- Closed: 1976
- Rebuilt: No

Former services
| Preceding station | Central Railroad of New Jersey | Following station |
|---|---|---|
| Wilkes-Barre toward Scranton | Main Line | Allentown toward Jersey City |
| Penn Haven Junction toward Scranton | Main Line | Lehighton toward Jersey City |
- Central Railroad of New Jersey Station
- U.S. National Register of Historic Places
- Location within Pennsylvania Location within the United States
- Coordinates: 40°51′46″N 75°44′19″W
- Area: 0.5 acres (0.20 ha)
- Built: 1888
- Architect: Wilson Brothers & Company; Neast & Co.
- Architectural style: Queen Anne
- NRHP reference No.: 76001615
- Added to NRHP: January 1, 1976
Location

The Central Railroad of New Jersey Station, also known as the Jersey Central Station and Jim Thorpe Station, is a historic railroad station in Jim Thorpe, Carbon County, Pennsylvania. It was designed by Wilson Brothers & Company of Philadelphia, Pennsylvania, and built in 1888 by the Central Railroad of New Jersey. It is a 1 1/2-story, five-bay, red brick building in the Queen Anne style. It has a 3 1/2-story, cylindrical corner tower with a cylindrical roof. The community was also served by the Lehigh Valley Railroad station on the opposite side of the river.

The station was added to the National Register of Historic Places on January 1, 1976. Today, it is part of the Old Mauch Chunk Historic District. It is owned by the Lehigh Gorge Scenic Railway, which uses it for excursion trains and as a visitor center.

== See also ==
- List of stations on the Central Railroad of New Jersey
