= St. Mark's Episcopal Church (Jim Thorpe, Pennsylvania) =

Historic church in Pennsylvania, United States

- U.S. National Register of Historic Places
- U.S. National Historic Landmark
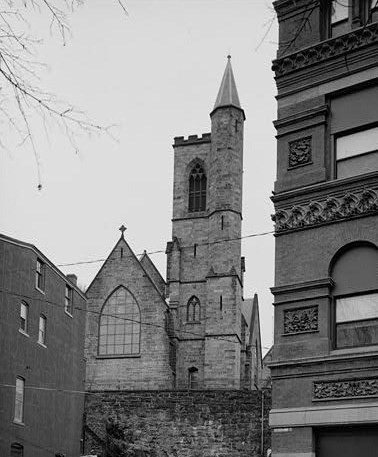
- St. Mark's Episcopal Church, HABS Photo, 1979

- Location within Pennsylvania Location within the United States
- Location: Race and Susquehanna Sts., Jim Thorpe, Pennsylvania
- Coordinates: 40°51′46″N 75°44′21″W
- Built: 1867–1869, 1887
- Architect: Richard Upjohn
- Architectural style: Gothic Revival
- NRHP reference No.: 77001135

Significant dates
- Added to NRHP: July 26, 1977
- Designated NHL: December 23, 1987

St. Mark's Episcopal Church, now the Episcopal Parish of St. Mark and St. John, is a historic Episcopal church at 21 Race Street in Jim Thorpe, Carbon County, Pennsylvania. Completed in 1869, it is a prominent example of Gothic Revival architecture designed by that style's leading proponent, Richard Upjohn. It is one of Upjohn's last designs, and was funded by the congregation, which contained eight millionaires whose fortunes were made in the coal fields and railroad industry. It was added to the National Register of Historic Places in 1977, and declared a National Historic Landmark in 1987.

The church reported 249 members in 2018 and 128 members in 2023; no membership statistics were reported nationally in 2024 parochial reports. Plate and pledge income reported for the congregation in 2024 was $54,794. Average Sunday attendance (ASA) in 2024 was 25 persons, down from a reported 65 in 2015.

== Description and history ==
The congregation was established in 1835 and its first church was completed in 1848, with a formal consecration in 1852. This first church was torn down in 1867 to make way for the church that is currently standing. It occupies a prominent location in the historic center of Mauch Chunk, on the south side of Race Street just west of Susquehanna Street.

This church was designed by Richard Upjohn and was consecrated on October 25, 1869. The church is a late work of Upton's, and represents a relatively pure version of the Gothic Revival, well removed from the stylistic elements of the Greek Revival that he began his career with. It is a stone structure, built primarily out of local gray stone, with red stone as trim. It is set partly on natural terrace in a steeply sloping hillside, which has been extended and supported by a stone retaining wall. The church has a cruciform plan, with a square tower rising at the northeast corner. The outer corner of tower is extended by an octagonal stair turret, which rises a short way beyond the crenellated tower top to its own conical roof. The interior is tiered with the entrance and a small chapel at the lowest level, an intermediate level which houses Sunday School rooms and the church office, and then the main sanctuary on the third floor. The interior is lavishly appointed, with English Minton tile, Black Walnut, and stained glass windows by Louis Comfort Tiffany and Charles Gibson. There are also several commissioned works of fine art, including brass work by J.R. Lamb, a 24 karat gold illumination, and several hand carved pieces.

Asa Packer was a vestryman for 44 years and warden for 24 years. He and his family donated considerable funds toward the construction of the church and its additions. The Asa Packer Memorial Building, designed by Addison Hutton, was added to the church in 1881, two years after Packer's death. Packer's daughter Mary Packer Cummings funded a major renovation project that connected the church and the Memorial Building with an Otis Cage Elevator and installed a new Austin Company pipe organ. When Packer Cummings died during these 1912 renovations, the Memorial Building was renamed after her.

The church congregation declined during the Great Depression, and it entered a cost-sharing agreement with Mauch Chunk's other Episcopal congregation, St. John's. The two were formally merged in 1980, and the St. John's church building was sold in 1984.

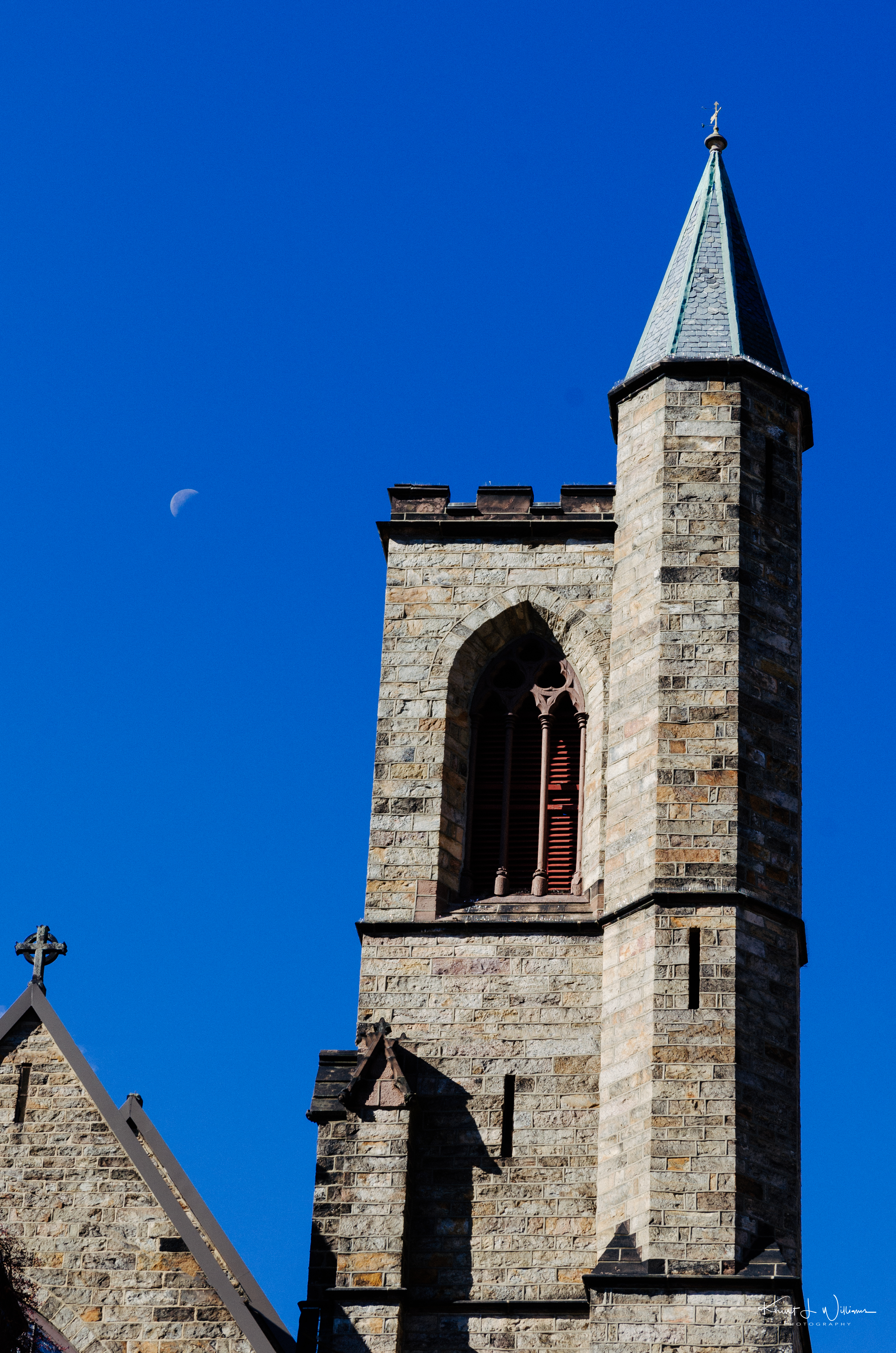
Tower

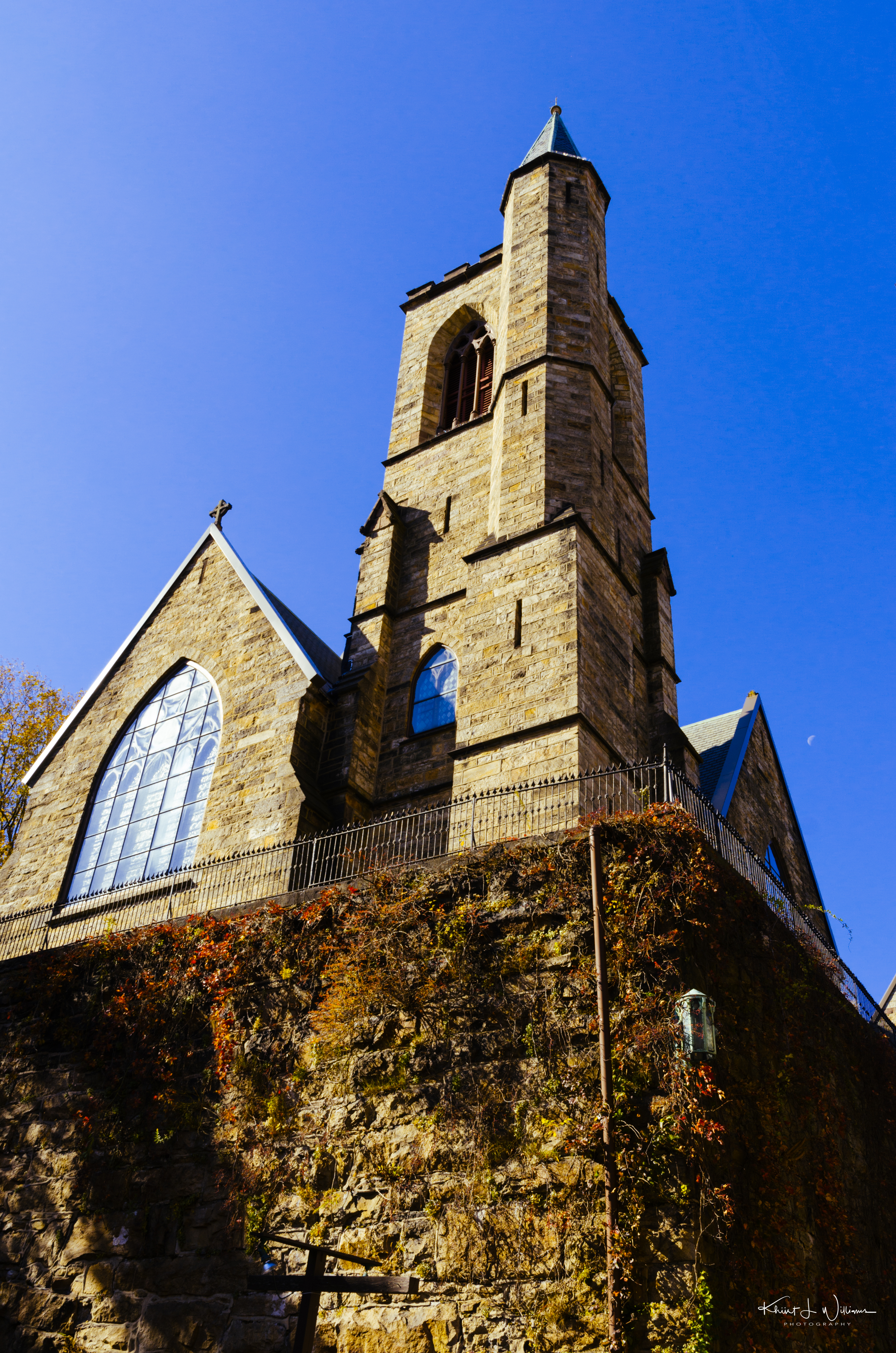

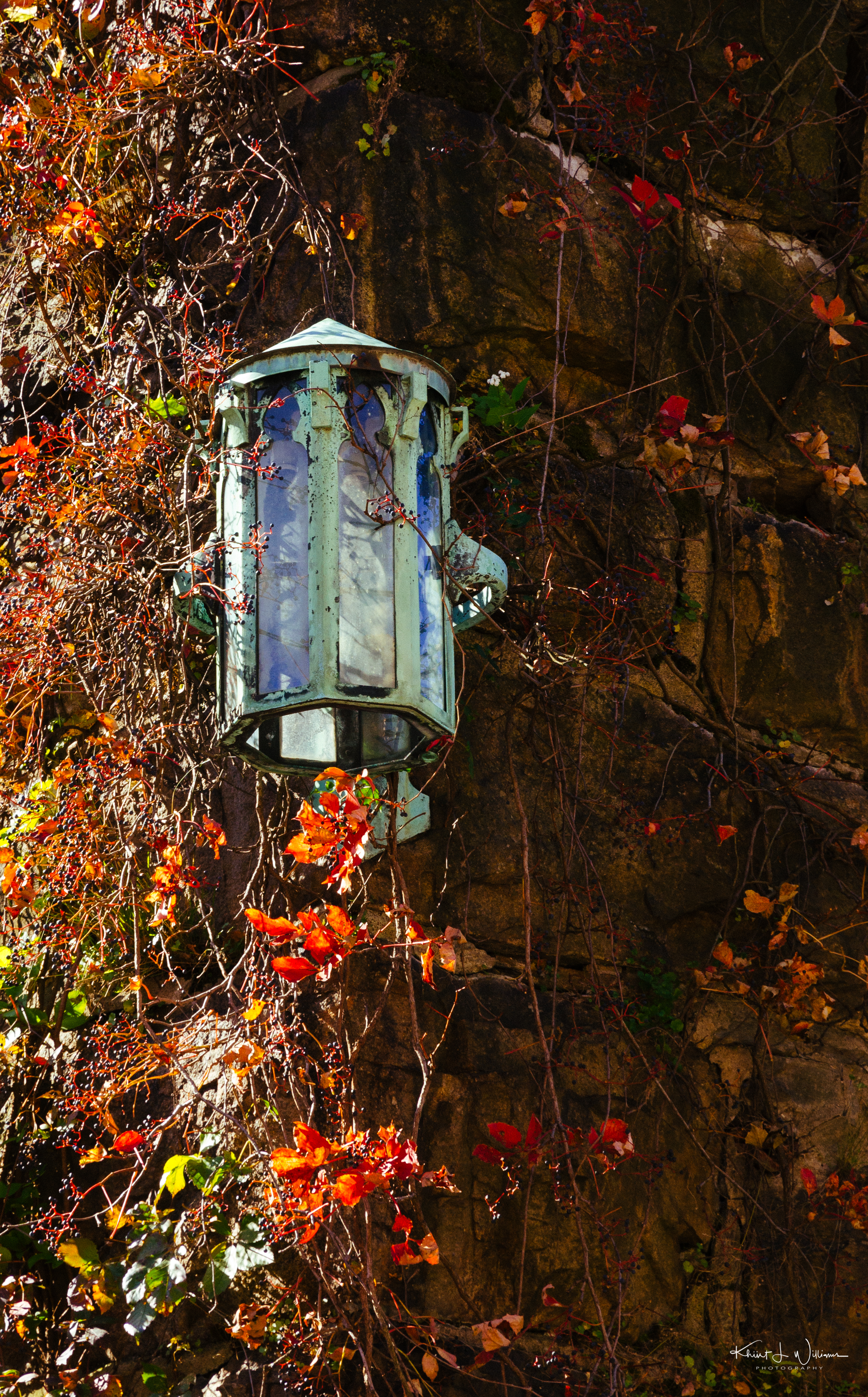
Lamp
