= Jim Thorpe, Pennsylvania =

Borough in Pennsylvania, United States

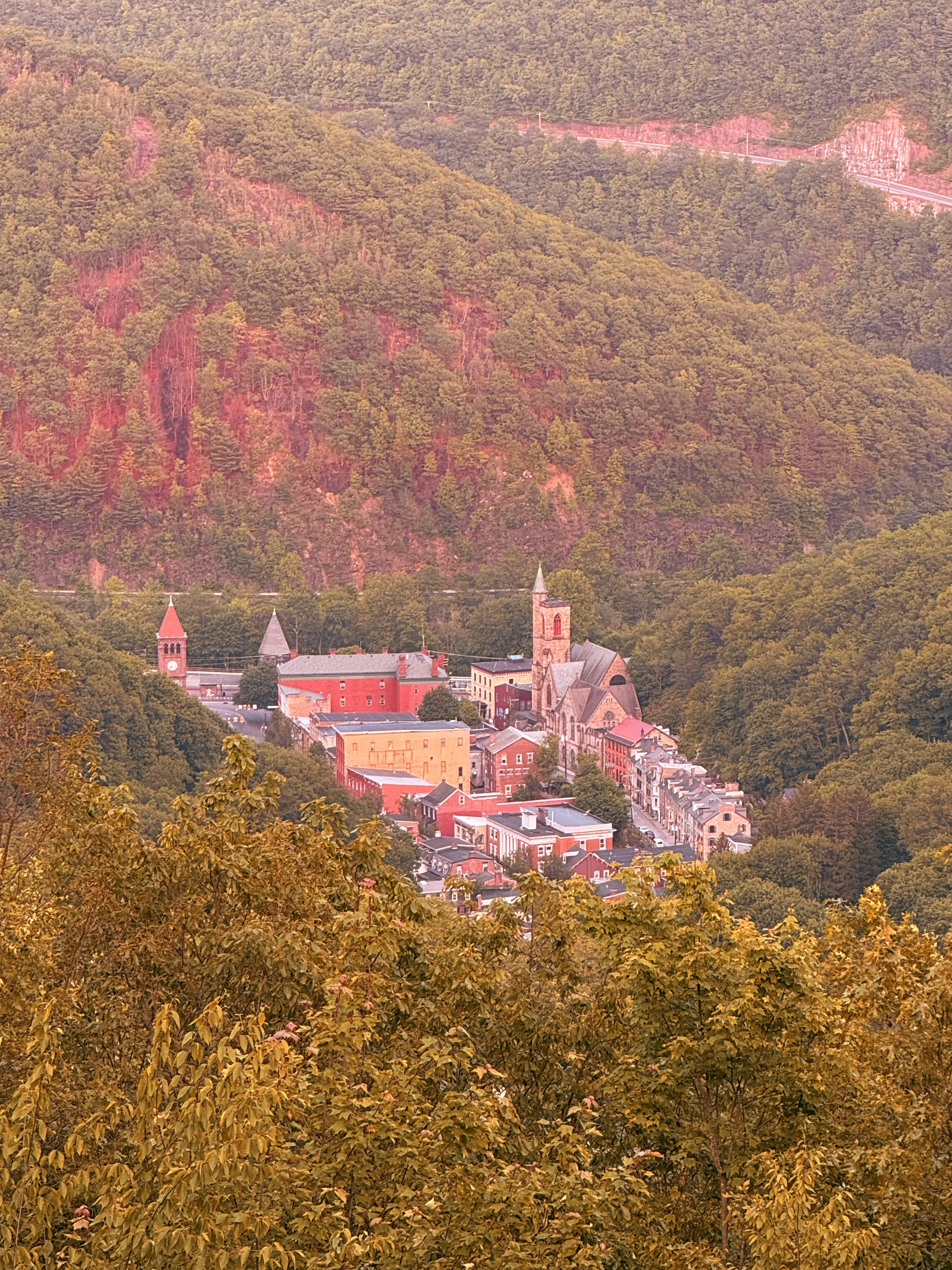
- View from the Switchback Railroad Trail that highlights the St. Mark's and St. John's Episcopal Church

- Seal
- Nickname(s): The Switzerland of America, The Gateway to the Poconos
- Location of Jim Thorpe in Carbon County, Pennsylvania (left) and of Carbon County in Pennsylvania (right)

- Location of Jim Thorpe in Pennsylvania Jim Thorpe (the United States)
- Coordinates: 40°52′23″N 75°44′11″W
- Country: United States
- State: Pennsylvania
- County: Carbon
- Founded: 1818

Government
  - Mayor: Eric Cinicola

Area
  - Total: 14.92 sq mi (38.64 km^{2})
  - Land: 14.60 sq mi (37.81 km^{2})
  - Water: 0.32 sq mi (0.83 km^{2})
- Elevation: 730 ft (220 m)

Population (2020)
  - Total: 4,507
  - Density: 309/sq mi (119.2/km^{2})
- Time zone: UTC-5 (EST)
  - Summer (DST): UTC-4 (EDT)
- ZIP code: 18229
- Area code(s): 570
- FIPS code: 42-38200
- GNIS ID: 1178082, 1215045
- Website: www.jtborough.org

Jim Thorpe, known as Mauch Chunk and East Mauch Chunk until 1954, is a borough and the county seat of Carbon County, Pennsylvania, United States. It is part of Northeastern Pennsylvania. It is the burial site of Native American sports legend Jim Thorpe, who had no connection with the borough in his lifetime. As of the 2020 census, Jim Thorpe had a population of 4,507.

Jim Thorpe is located in the Pocono Mountains, approximately 29 miles (47 km) northwest of Allentown, 83 miles (134 km) northwest of Philadelphia, and 117 miles (188 km) west of New York City.

== History ==
=== Founding ===
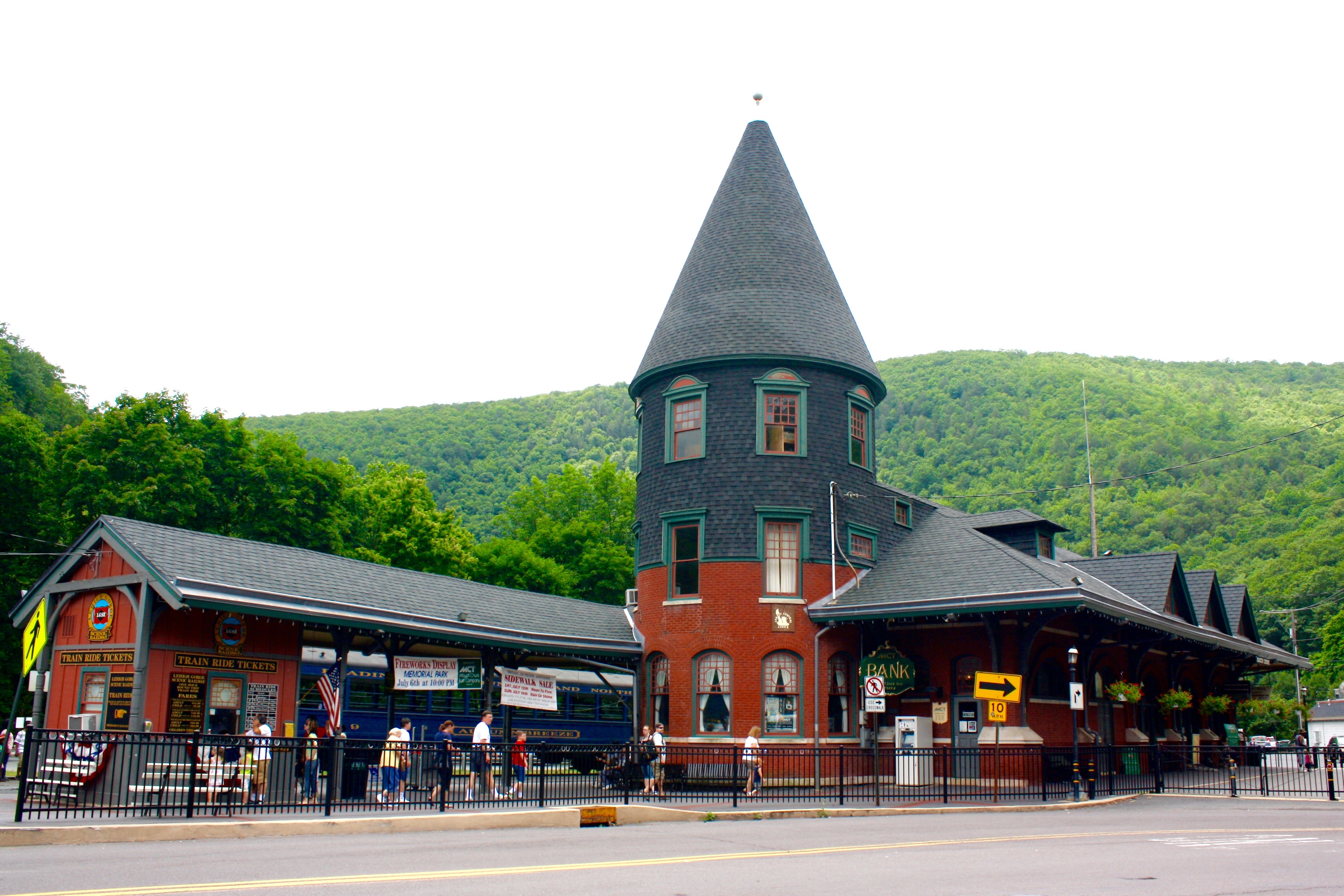
Central Railroad of New Jersey Station in Jim Thorpe, now a visitors' center

Jim Thorpe was founded in 1818 as Mauch Chunk (/ˌmɔːk ˈtʃʌŋk/), a name derived from the term Mawsch Unk, meaning Bear Place in Unami, the language of the native Lenape, possibly a reference to Bear Mountain, an extension of Mauch Chunk Ridge that resembled a sleeping bear, or perhaps the original profile of the ridge, which has since been changed heavily by 220 years of mining. The company town was founded by Josiah White and his two partners, founders of the Lehigh Coal & Navigation Company (LC&N). The town would be the lower terminus of a gravity railroad, the Summit Hill & Mauch Chunk Railroad, which would bring coal to the head of the LC&N Lehigh Canal for transshipment to the confluence of the Delaware River, 43 kilometres (26.7 mi) downstream at Easton. It would thereby ship LC&N's coal to Philadelphia, Trenton, New York City, and other large cities in New Jersey and Delaware, and by ocean to the whole East Coast. Canal shipping was eventually replaced by railroad shipping.

=== Coal mining and the LC&N canal ===
The town grew slowly in its first decade, then rapidly around 1818 grew larger as it became an anthracite coal-shipping center. (The other large city with growing coal mining in the region was Scranton, with a population of over 140,000.) Mauch Chunk is on a Lehigh River west side (right bank) flat where Mahoning Creek enters and is a tributary of the Lehigh River. The river's left bank community of East Mauch Chunk, which has more of the houses of modern Jim Thorpe, was settled later to support the short-lived Beaver Creek Railroad, the mines which spawned it, and the logging industry. It came into greater growth when the Lehigh Valley Railroad in 1885 pushed up the valley on the river's east bank to oppose LC&N's effective transportation monopoly over the region, which extended across to northwest Wilkes-Barre at Pittston on the Susquehanna River/Pennsylvania Canal.

=== Railroad growth and coal shipping ===
After the Pennsylvania Canal Commission smoothed the way, Lehigh Coal & Navigation built the Lehigh and Susquehanna Railroad (L&S) from Pittston to Ashley, building the Ashley Planes inclined railway and linked that by rail from Mountain Top to White Haven at the head of the canal's upper works, referred to as the Grand Lehigh Canal, whose navigations shortened the Lehigh Gorge, now located in the Lehigh Gorge State Park route, cutting the distance from Philadelphia to Wilkes-Barre and the Wyoming Valley coal deposits by over 100 miles (160 km). This placed Mauch Chunk in the center of a nexus of transportation in country tough to travel through. When floods wiped out many of the upper Lehigh Canal works in 1861, the L&S Railroad was extended through the gap to supplant the canal, and the so-called switchback-twisted backtrack through Avoca, with the improved engines of the day, enabled two-way steam locomotive traction and traffic despite the steep grades. Owner LC&N Company's headquarters was built across the street in Mauch Chunk from the L&S Railroad's stylish brick passenger station that was soon boarding passengers onto trains from New York and Philadelphia to Buffalo. The Central Railroad of New Jersey eventually took over the L&S and the station. The Lehigh Valley Railroad arrived on the river's east bank at East Mauch Chunk in 1855.,

=== Major historical events ===
Mauch Chunk was the location of one of the trials of the Molly Maguires in 1876, which resulted in the hanging of four men found guilty of murder. The population of the borough in 1900 was 4,020; in 1910, it was 3,952.

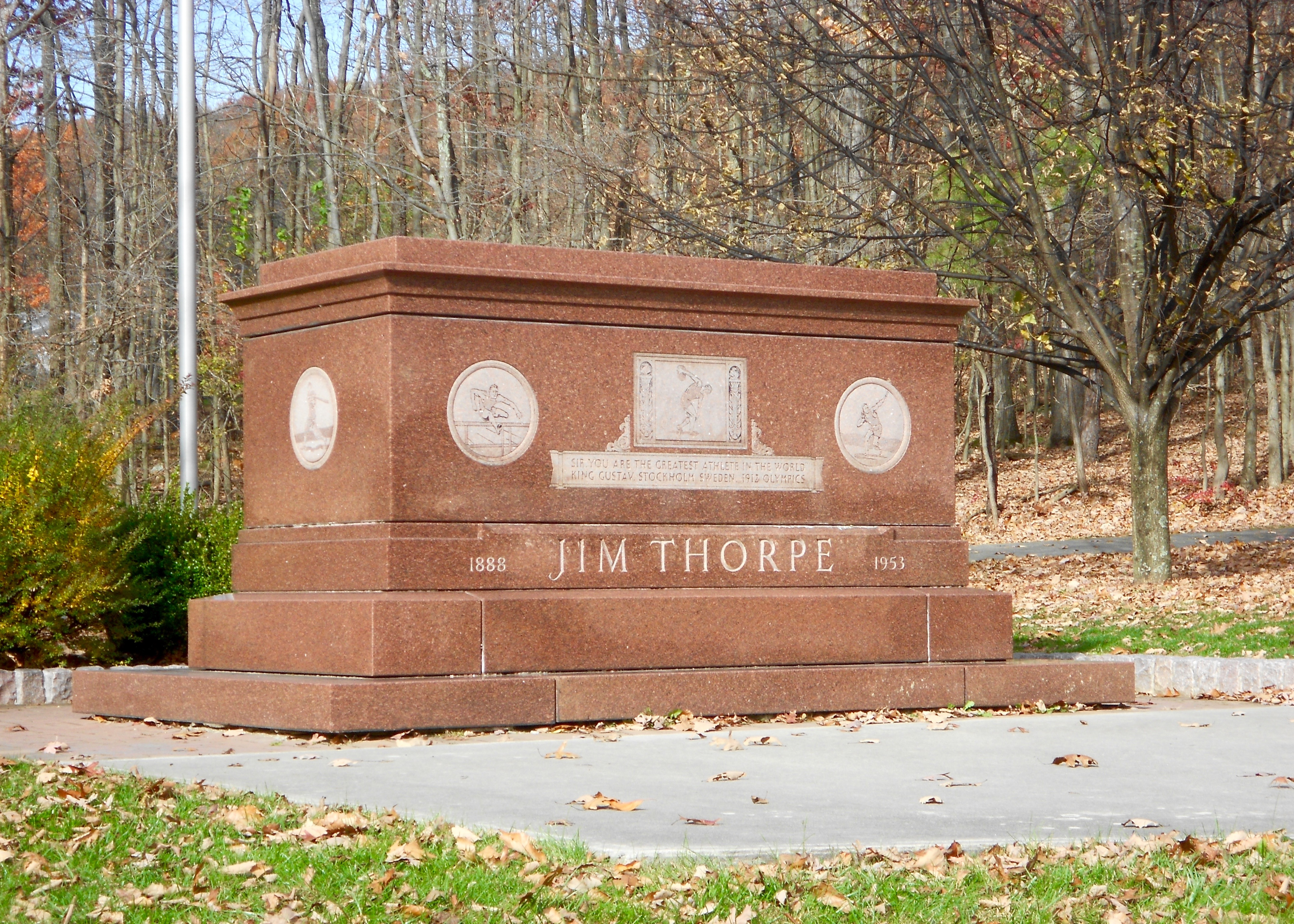
Jim Thorpe's gravesite

Following the 1953 death of athlete and Olympic medal winner Jim Thorpe, Thorpe's widow and third wife, Patricia, was impatient when, after five months, the planned memorial in Shawnee, Oklahoma had yet to raise the $100,000 to honor him. The town's citizens had paid for her, a Thorpe son and Jim's body to be shipped from California, paid and arranged for the funeral service at St. Benedict's Catholic church, and paid for the mausoleum costs at Fairview Cemetery. Then Gov. Johnston Murray vetoed a bill which would contribute funds to the erection of the memorial at Athletic Park. On Sept. 1 Mrs. Thorpe, saying she feared Jim would be buried in a potter's field, shipped the body to Tulsa where she said the Chamber of Commerce was going to build a proper memorial, which was not true. When she heard that the boroughs of Mauch Chunk and East Mauch Chunk were desperately seeking to attract business, she made a deal with civic officials. According to Jim Thorpe's son, Jack, Patricia was motivated by money in seeking the deal.

=== Renaming to Jim Thorpe ===
The two cross-river boroughs merged in 1954 and renamed the new municipality Jim Thorpe in his honor, despite Thorpe never setting foot in the Borough while alive. The municipality then obtained the athlete's remains from his widow and erected a monument to the Oklahoma native, who began his sports career 100 miles (161 kilometres) southwest, as a student at the Carlisle Indian Industrial School in Carlisle, Pennsylvania. The monument site contains his tomb, two statues of him in athletic poses, and historical markers describing his life story. The grave rests on mounds of soil from Thorpe's native Oklahoma and from the Stockholm Olympic Stadium in which he won his Olympic medals.

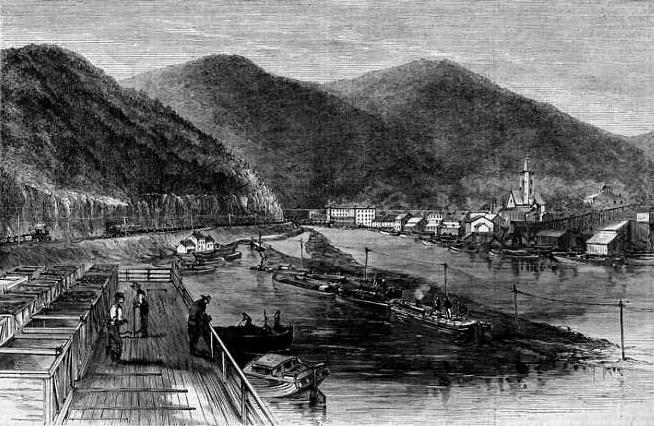
View of Mauch Chunk in 1869

On June 24, 2010, one of Jim Thorpe's sons, Jack Thorpe, sued the town for his father's remains, citing the Native American Graves Protection and Repatriation Act, which is designed to return Native American artifacts to their tribal homelands. On February 11, 2011, Judge Richard Caputo ruled that Jack Thorpe could not gain any monetary award, nor any amount for attorney's fees in the lawsuit and that for the lawsuit to continue other members of the Thorpe family and the Sac and Fox Nation would have to join him as plaintiffs. Before Jack Thorpe could respond to the ruling he died at the age of 73 on February 22, 2011. Because of his death his representatives were given more time to respond to the ruling. On May 2, 2011, William and Richard Thorpe, Jim Thorpe's remaining sons and the Sac & Fox Nation of Oklahoma joined the lawsuit, allowing it to continue. On April 19, 2013, Caputo ruled in favor of William and Richard Thorpe, ruling that the borough amounts to a museum under the law. This ruling was reversed by the United States Court of Appeals for the Third Circuit on October 23, 2014. The U.S. Supreme Court refused to hear their appeal on October 5, 2015, assuring that Jim Thorpe's remains will stay in Carbon County.

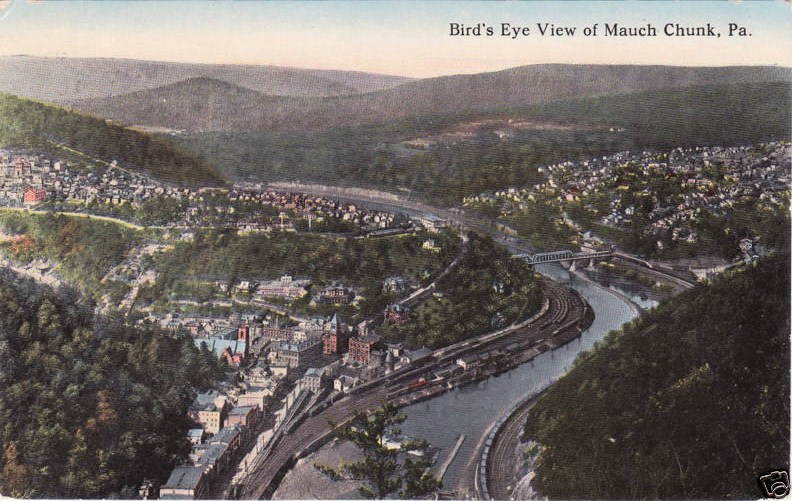
1915 postcard showing a bird's eye view of the community

The decision to rename the borough saw a mixed reaction by the borough's residents, many of whom still refer to the borough as Mauch Chunk. Detractors to the new name claim that the renaming was a "Tourist Lure" and protested that Jim Thorpe had never even set eyes on the borough while he was alive. There were several movements to rename the borough back to Mauch Chunk, first in 1964 after the expected boost in tourism never came and another in 1992 as Jim Thorpe's popularity waned and locals referred to renaming the borough after a dead Native American to boost tourism revenues as "crass commercialism" while Thorpe's family called for his remains to be returned to Oklahoma.

=== Architecture ===
The history of the 1880s Mauch Chunk is reflected in the architecture that makes up its many 19th century styles. A former resident and architectural historian, Hans Egli, noted the vast range of styles: Federalist, Greek Revival, Second Empire, Romanesque Revival, Queen Anne, and Richardsonian Romanesque. Most of these architectural examples remained protected and intact beneath aluminum or vinyl siding that has since been removed. Denise Scott Brown and Robert Venturi, renowned Philadelphia architects, conducted a little-known planning study in the 1970s that attempted to understand the dynamics of historicism and tourism, notions that have come into their own in contemporary times. While Venturi's planning study was unique at the time, it has since become a critical factor in Jim Thorpe's rebound as a functioning and economically stable community. Jim Thorpe tourism is based on its vintage architecture, and recreation such as hiking, paintball and whitewater rafting.

=== Historic site preservation and modern day use ===
The Carbon County Section of the Lehigh Canal, Old Mauch Chunk Historic District, Mauch Chunk Switchback Railway, Asa Packer Mansion, Harry Packer Mansion, Carbon County Jail, Central Railroad of New Jersey Station, and St. Mark's Episcopal Church are listed on the National Register of Historic Places. The former Central Railroad of New Jersey railroad line through the Lehigh gorge and through Jim Thorpe is now operated as a summer tourist railroad by Reading Blue Mountain & Northern Railroad. The former New York City to Buffalo Lehigh Valley Railroad across the river is a present-day very active freight hauling railroad operated by Norfolk Southern.

== Mauch Chunk Switchback Gravity Railroad ==
In 1827, the Lehigh Coal & Navigation Company, a coal mining and shipping company with operations in Summit Hill, constructed an 8.7-mile (14.0 km) downhill track, known as a gravity railroad, to deliver coal (and a miner to operate the mine train's brake) to the Lehigh Canal in Mauch Chunk. It is often cited as the first roller coaster in the United States. This railroad helped open up the area to commerce, and helped to fuel the Industrial Revolution in the US. By the 1850s, the "Gravity Road" (as it became known) was providing rides to thrill seekers for 50 cents a ride (equal to $17.28 today). The Switchback Gravity Railroad Foundation was formed to study the feasibility of preserving and interpreting the remains of the Switchback Gravity Railroad on top of Mount Pisgah.

== Geography ==
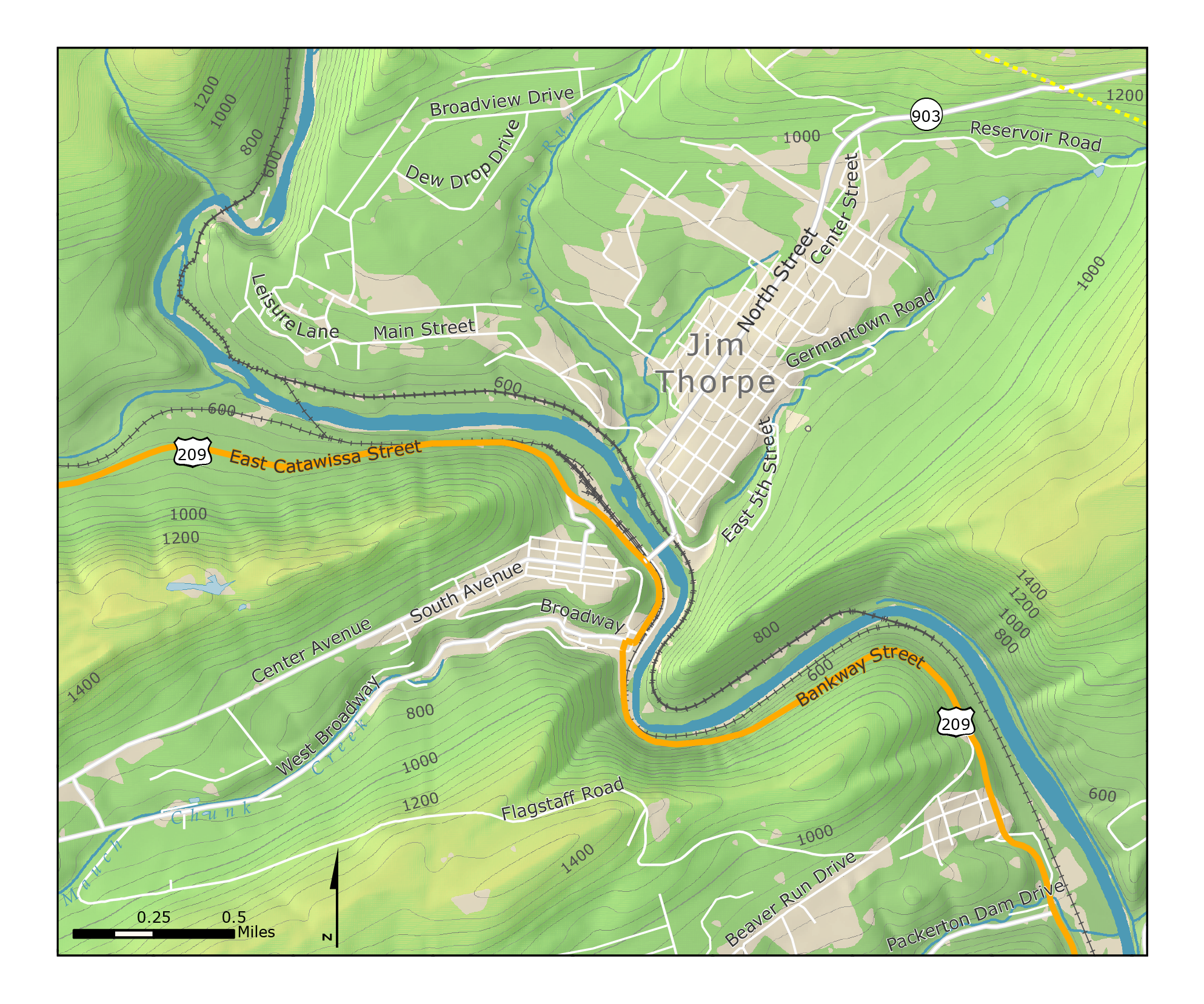
Jim Thorpe lies in the shadow of Mount Pisgah at the end of Pisgah Mountain (Pisgah Ridge), upriver of the Lehigh Gap between Bear Mountain on the east/left bank and the valley of Mauch Chunk Creek on the right bank.

Jim Thorpe is located near the center of Carbon County at 40°52′23″N 75°44′11″W.

In the deeps of the geologic time scale the two shorelines of the Lehigh River occupied by the 19th-century towns of Mauch Chunk and East Mauch Chunk were situated on the bottom of an ancient river-fed tarn, a mountain lake which filled the valley on the west bank and covered the relative flatlands on the east bank. The muddy bottom of that high tarn (the range then rivaling the Himalayas in size), where the waters pooled at a lower elevation amongst the twisted folds of four near-parallel ridgelines, created a level region whose settlements became the relatively flat lands on either bank of the Lehigh. The ridgelines, which run east-northeast to west-southwest, are (from north to south) Broad, Nesquehoning, Pisgah, and Mauch Chunk ridges (or Mountains)—each of which runs over 15 miles (24.1 km) west to the gaps cut by the Schuylkill River.

According to the United States Census Bureau, the borough of Jim Thorpe has a total area of 14.9 square miles (38.6 km^{2}), of which 14.6 square miles (37.8 km^{2}) is land and 0.3 square miles (0.8 km^{2}), or 2.15%, is water. Jim Thorpe is 3 miles (5 km) north and upstream of Lehighton, below the Lehigh Gap which sunders Bear Mountain on the east bank from the extended ridge of Mauch Chunk Mountain.

The town is 4 miles (6 km) east of Nesquehoning, which is up a steep grade and around the bend along U.S. Route 209 South, and also butting up against the slopes of Mount Pisgah. This was a key element in the LC&N's planning, for the grade from the mountain ridge down to the river enabled them to fill barges quickly, using chutes and an elevated entry from a road down the ridge face. Jim Thorpe's developed elevations range between the river slack water at 540 feet (160 m) above sea level—720 feet (219.5 m) to the town's upper streets, all below the western peak of Mount Pisgah, which tops out at 1,519 feet (463.0 m) above sea level.

The elevation of the Borough of Jim Thorpe ranges from 540 feet (160 m) at Broadway and Hazard Square downtown to 1,700 feet (520 m) above sea level 3 miles (5 km) northeast of the borough center near the Penn Forest Township line. It has a warm-summer humid continental climate (Dfb) and average downtown monthly temperatures range from 26.5 °F in January to 71.2 °F in July. The local hardiness zone is 6a.

== Transportation ==
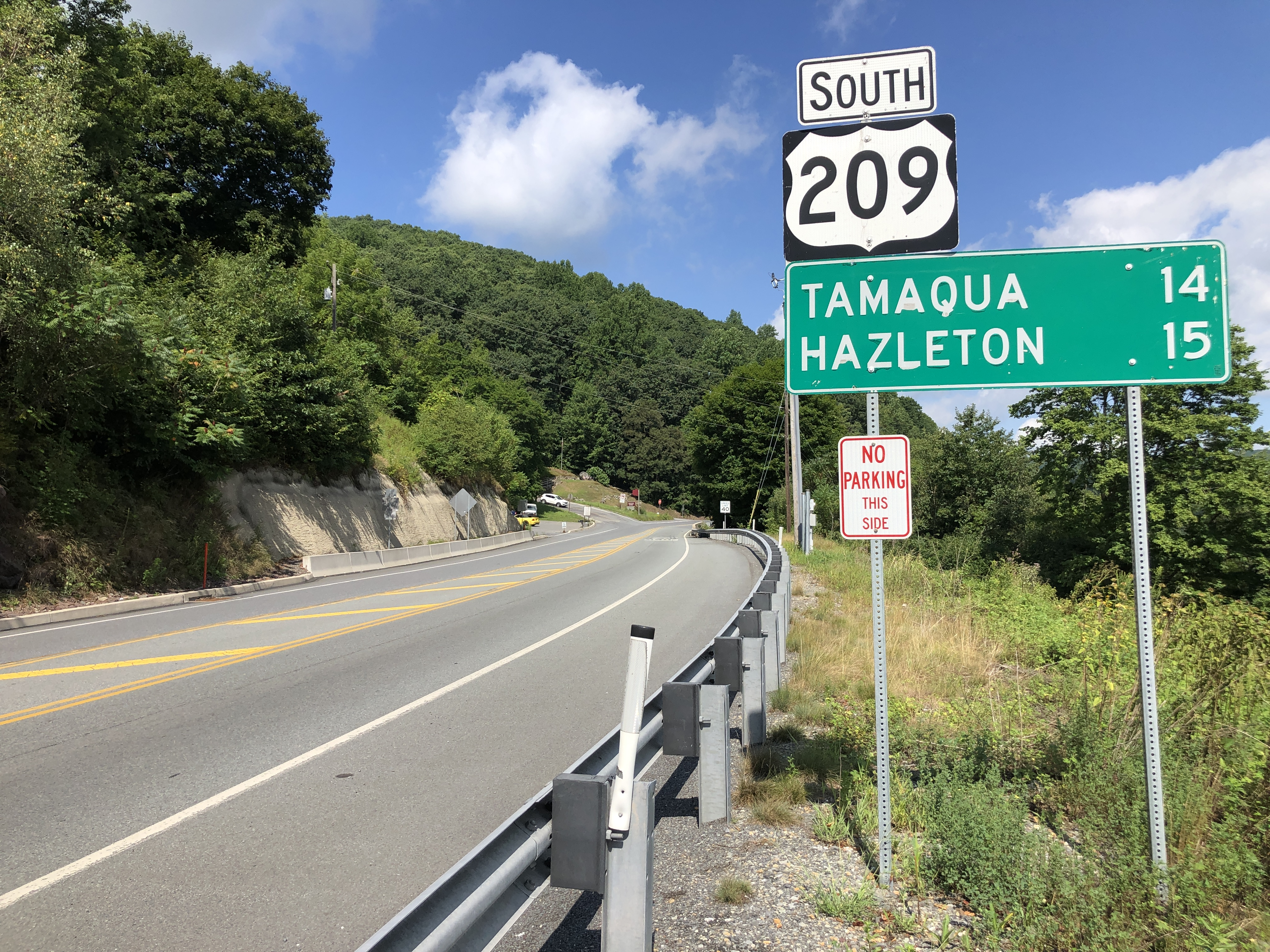
US 209 southbound in Jim Thorpe

As of 2019, there were 30.08 miles (48.41 km) of public roads in Jim Thorpe, of which 10.95 miles (17.62 km) were maintained by the Pennsylvania Department of Transportation (PennDOT) and 19.13 miles (30.79 km) were maintained by the borough.

U.S. Route 209, although signed as a north–south route, tends to follow an east–west route in Pennsylvania. In Jim Thorpe and Lehighton, US 209 runs in directions opposite its signage—i.e., northbound US 209 runs southwards and vice versa. It intersects the Pennsylvania Turnpike Northeast Extension (Interstate 476) east of Lehighton, about 6 miles (10 km) southeast of Jim Thorpe.

Pennsylvania Route 903 has its southern terminus at US 209 in Jim Thorpe. It is a north–south route that runs northeast of town, connecting to PA 115 near Pocono Raceway, Interstate 476, and PA 534 in Penn Forest Township.

Carbon Transit provides bus service to Jim Thorpe along Route 701, which runs between Coaldale and Palmerton on Mondays, Wednesdays, and Fridays, and Route 702, which runs between Nesquehoning and Palmerton Monday-Friday. Carbon Transit also operates CT Flex service in Jim Thorpe, Penn Forest Township, and Kidder Township.

The town is served by the Reading Blue Mountain and Northern Railroad with year-round freight service. Seasonal passenger excursions to and from the town is provided by its subsidiary, the Lehigh Gorge Scenic Railway.

== Demographics ==
Historical population
Census	Pop.	Note	%±
1960	5,945		—
1970	5,456		−8.2%
1980	5,263		−3.5%
1990	5,048		−4.1%
2000	4,804		−4.8%
2010	4,781		−0.5%
2020	4,507		−5.7%

=== 2020 census ===
As of the 2020 census, Jim Thorpe had a population of 4,507. The median age was 48.1 years. 18.7% of residents were under the age of 18 and 22.2% of residents were 65 years of age or older. For every 100 females there were 97.4 males, and for every 100 females age 18 and over there were 96.0 males age 18 and over.

78.1% of residents lived in urban areas, while 21.9% lived in rural areas.

There were 1,969 households in Jim Thorpe, of which 24.1% had children under the age of 18 living in them. Of all households, 44.7% were married-couple households, 21.0% were households with a male householder and no spouse or partner present, and 27.1% were households with a female householder and no spouse or partner present. About 30.2% of all households were made up of individuals and 14.3% had someone living alone who was 65 years of age or older.

There were 2,286 housing units, of which 13.9% were vacant. The homeowner vacancy rate was 1.2% and the rental vacancy rate was 8.2%.

Racial composition as of the 2020 census
Race	Number	Percent
White	4,239	94.1%
Black or African American	25	0.6%
American Indian and Alaska Native	2	0.0%
Asian	26	0.6%
Native Hawaiian and Other Pacific Islander	3	0.1%
Some other race	47	1.0%
Two or more races	165	3.7%
Hispanic or Latino (of any race)	157	3.5%

=== 2010 census ===
As of the census of 2010, there were 4,781 people, 2,290 households, and 1,468 families residing in the borough. The population density was 332.1 inhabitants per square mile (128.2/km^{2}). There were 2,193 housing units at an average density of 151.6 per square mile (58.5/km^{2}). The racial makeup of the borough was 98.4% White, 1.6% African American, 1.0% Native American, 1.3% Asian, 1.0% Pacific Islander, 1.0% from other races, and 1.6% from two or more races. Hispanic or Latino people of any race were 1.8% of the population.

There were 1,967 households, of which 28.2% had children under the age of 18, 50.6% were married couples living together, 12.3% had a female householder with no husband present, and 32.1% were non-families. 27.1% of all households were made up of individuals, and 13.4% had someone living alone who was 65 years of age or older. The average household size was 2.42 and the average family size was 2.93.

In the borough, the population was spread out, with 21.0% under the age of 18, 8.2% from 18 to 24, 28.8% from 25 to 44, 24.9% from 45 to 64, and 17.1% who were 65 years of age or older. The median age was 41 years. For every 100 females, there were 95.4 males. For every 100 females age 18 and over, there were 91.9 males.

The median income for a household in the borough was $35,976, and the median income for a family was $43,710. Males had a median income of $31,141 versus $23,490 for females. The per capita income for the borough was $17,119. About 7.8% of families and 10.0% of the population were below the poverty line, including 18.3% of those under age 18 and 6.8% of those age 65 or over.

== Education ==
The school district is Jim Thorpe Area School District.

== Recreation ==
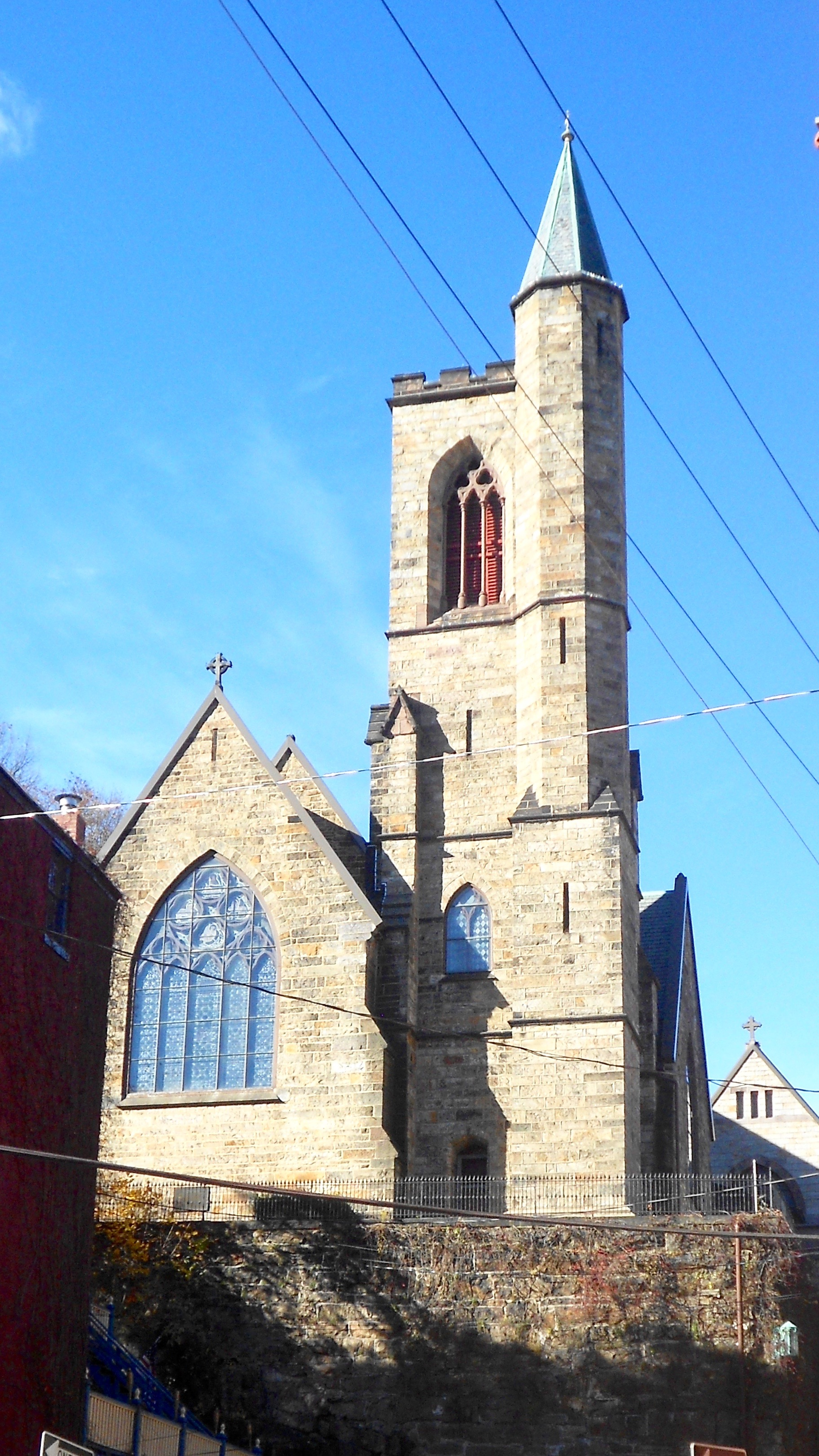
St. Mark's Episcopal Church

In a poll conducted in 2009 by Budget Travel magazine, Jim Thorpe was awarded a top 10 spot on America's Coolest Small Towns. The town registered 3,920 votes to land the number 7 spot on the list. In 2012, Jim Thorpe was voted the fourth most beautiful small town in America in the Rand McNally/USA Today Road Rally series. Jim Thorpe is becoming a tourist destination, with many businesses catering to whitewater rafting, mountain biking, paintball and hiking. Trails in Lehigh Gorge State Park attract hikers from all over, with Glen Onoko Falls a top trail destination just north of downtown. Along with these sports, Jim Thorpe is popular among railfans for its passenger rail service, and is known for its extraordinary architecture.

The town is home to the Asa Packer and Harry Packer mansions. Asa Packer founded Lehigh Valley Railroad and Lehigh University; Harry was his son. The mansions sit side by side on a hill overlooking downtown. The Asa Packer Mansion is a museum and has been conducting tours since Memorial Day of 1956. The Harry Packer Mansion is a bed and breakfast; it served as the model for the Haunted Mansion ride at Walt Disney World in Florida.

Jim Thorpe is home to the Anthracite Triathlon, an Olympic-distance triathlon open to amateur and professional triathletes. The swimming portion occurs in Mauch Chunk Lake, Which has kayaking and boating rentals for the public to use as well as a beach. The bike course takes riders through the mining towns of Summit Hill, Nesquehoning, Lansford and Jim Thorpe. The running portion of the course is generally along the former alignment of a historic switchback railroad.

The Anita Shapolsky Art Foundation was established at 20 West Broadway, in a 10,000-square-foot (930 m^{2}) 1859 former Presbyterian church, in Jim Thorpe in 1998. There, through the organization, Anita Shapolsky exhibits abstract artists and contemporary artworks during the summer, and provides educational programs for children.

In 2022, an upstart pro lacrosse league, the Professional Box Lacrosse Association, announced a franchise called the Jim Thorpe All Americans would be based there. However, no arena has yet been announced.

== Gallery ==
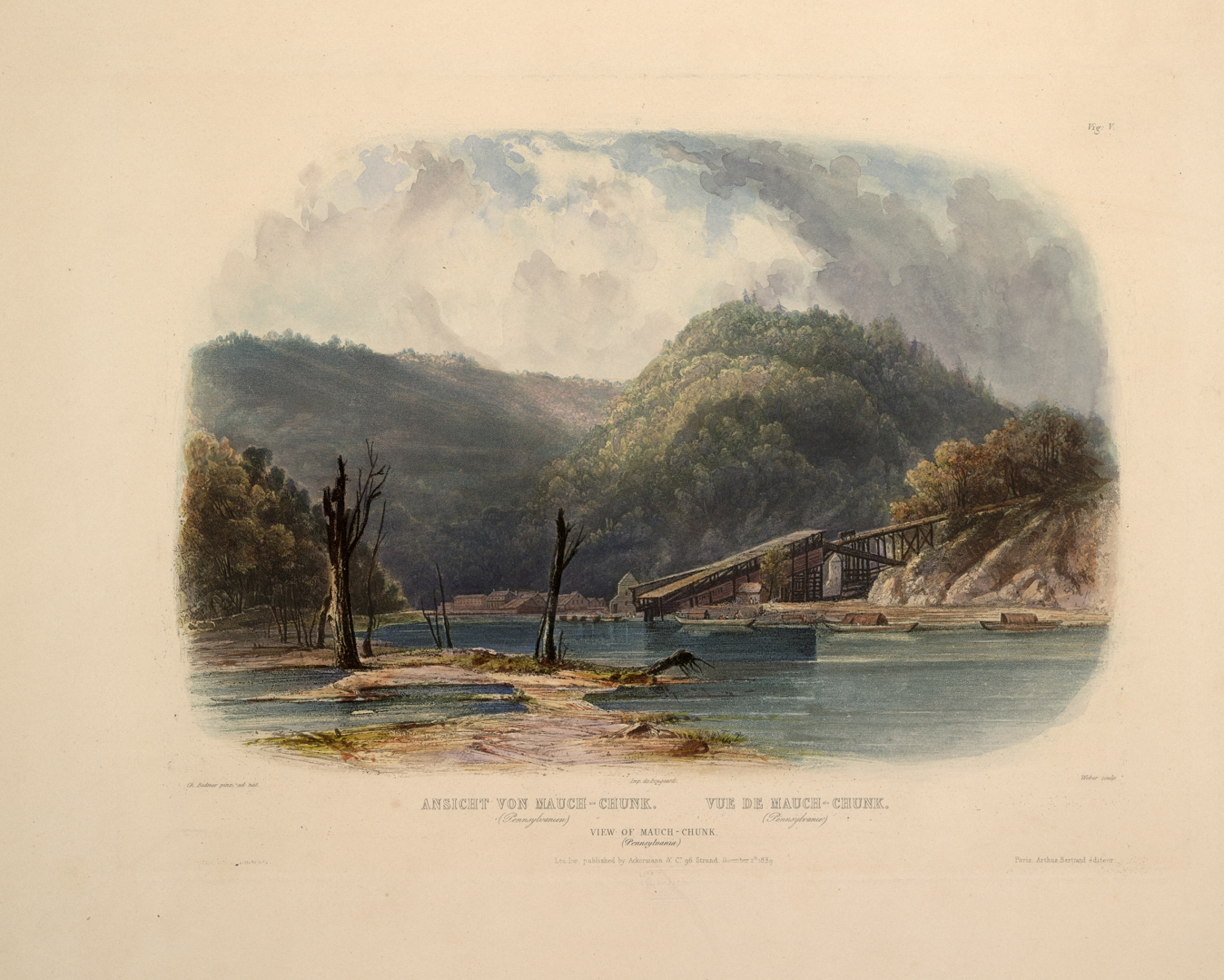
Painting by Karl Bodmer (1839)

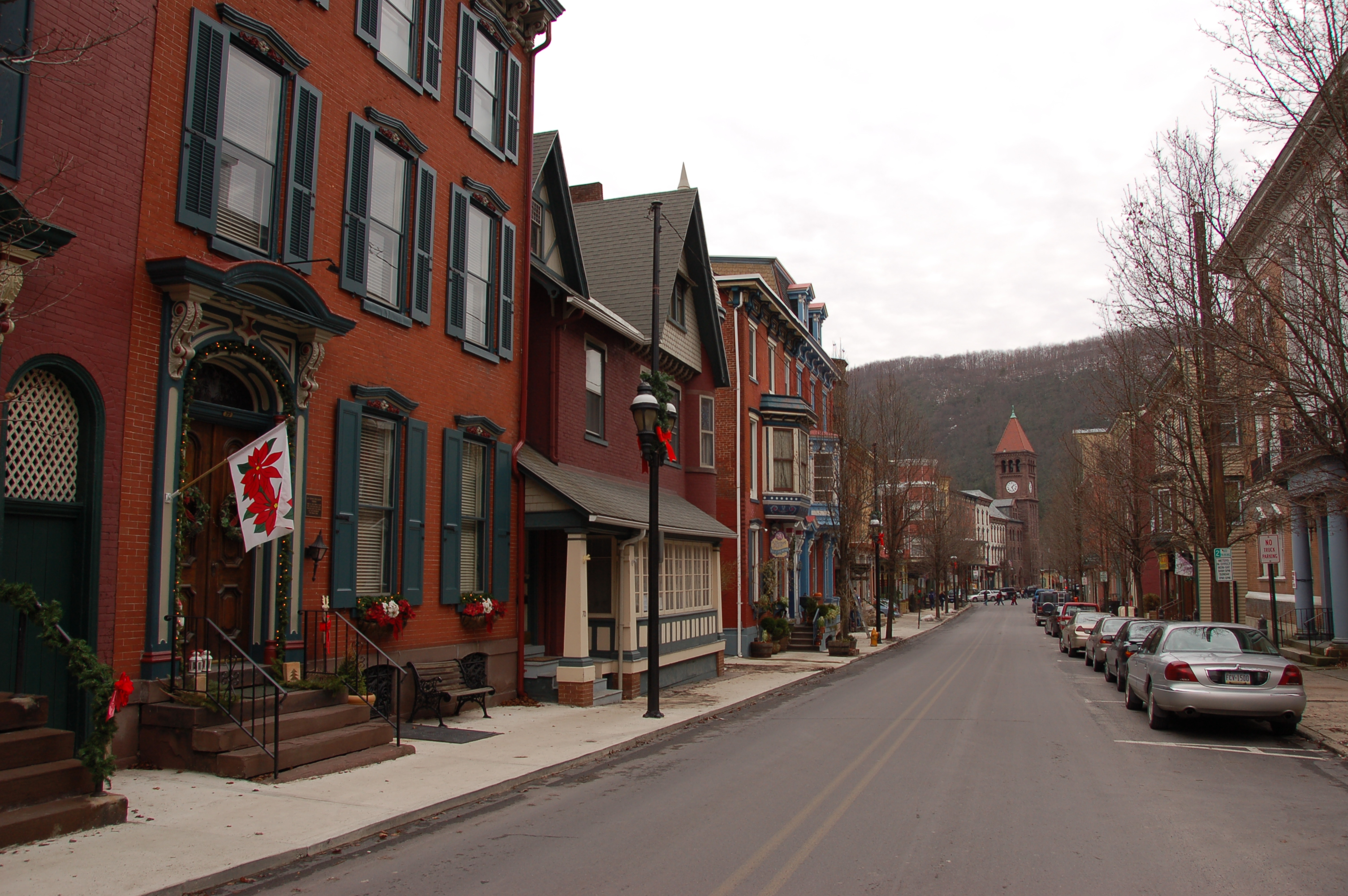
Historic buildings on Broadway

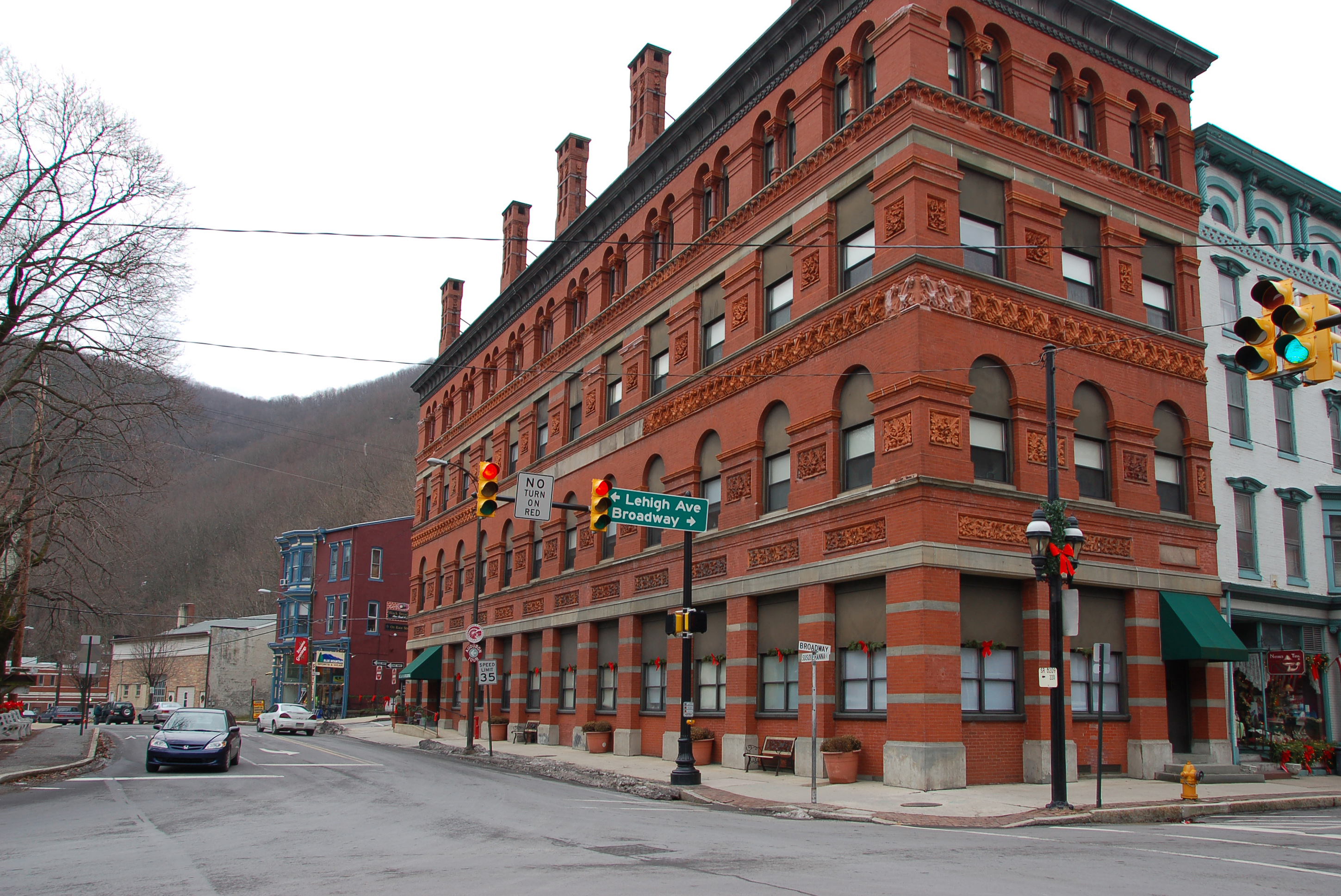
Lehigh Coal & Navigation Building, designed by architect Addison Hutton. Intersection of Broadway and Lehigh Avenue.

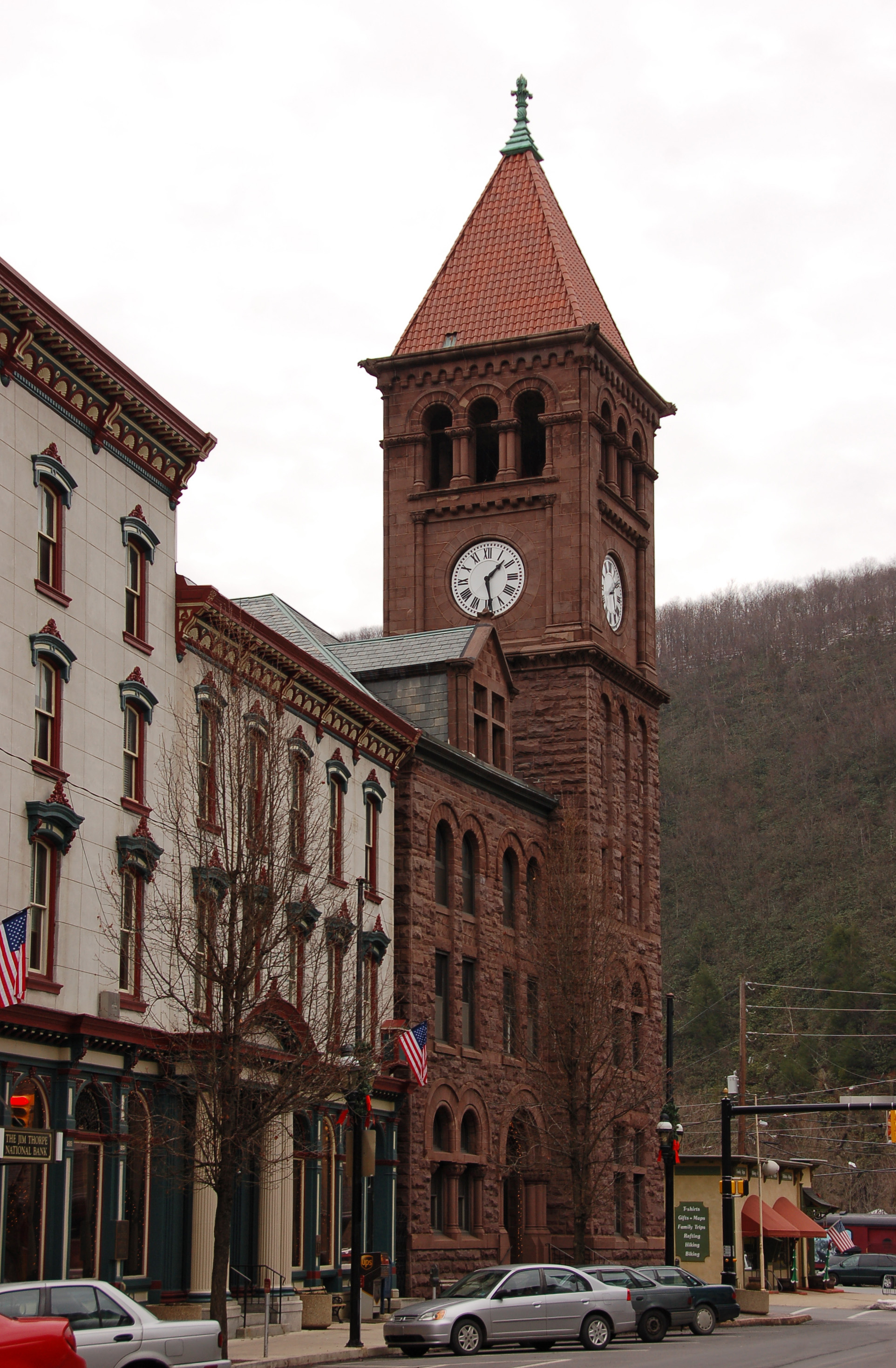
Clock tower at the same intersection

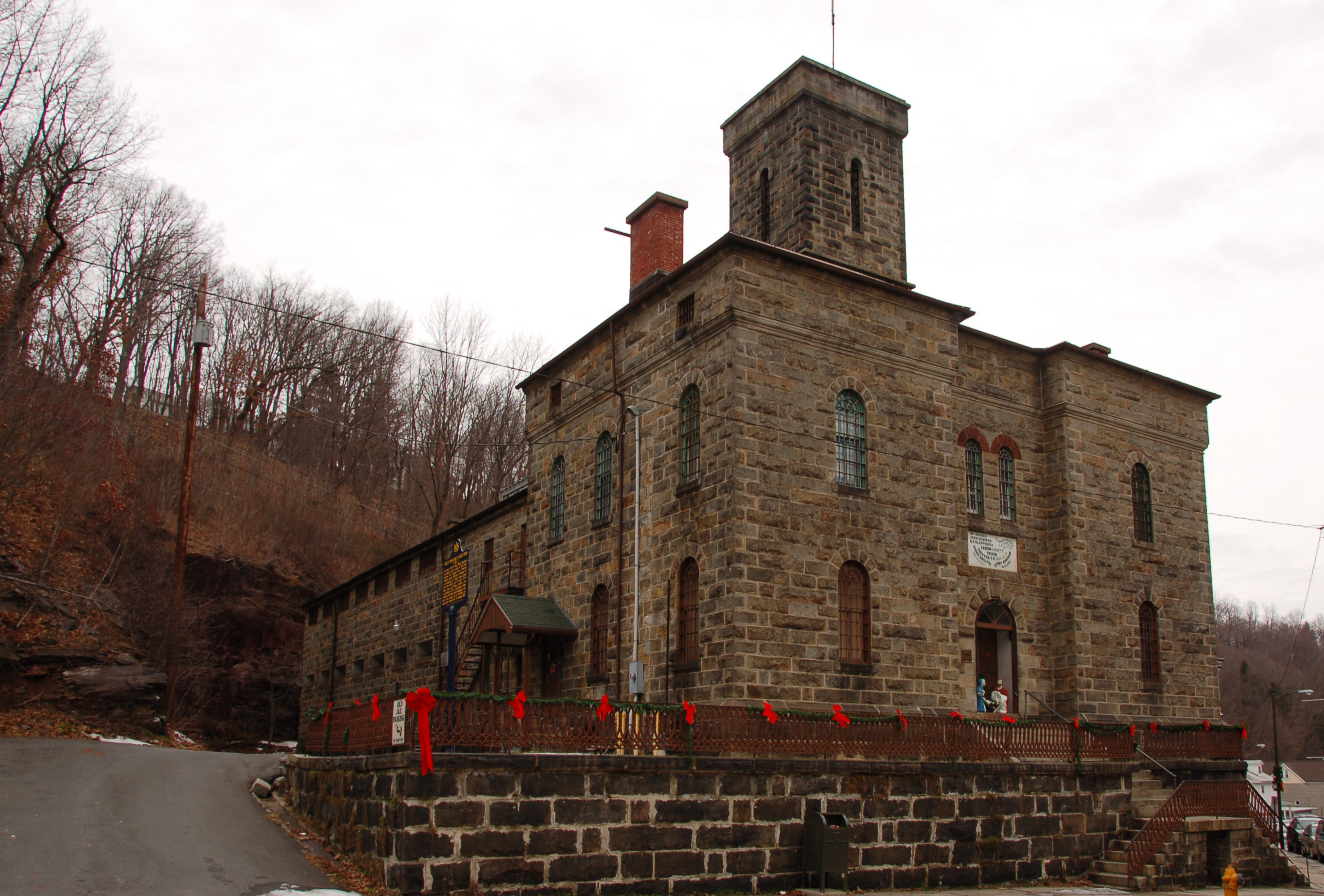
Former Carbon County Jail, on Broadway

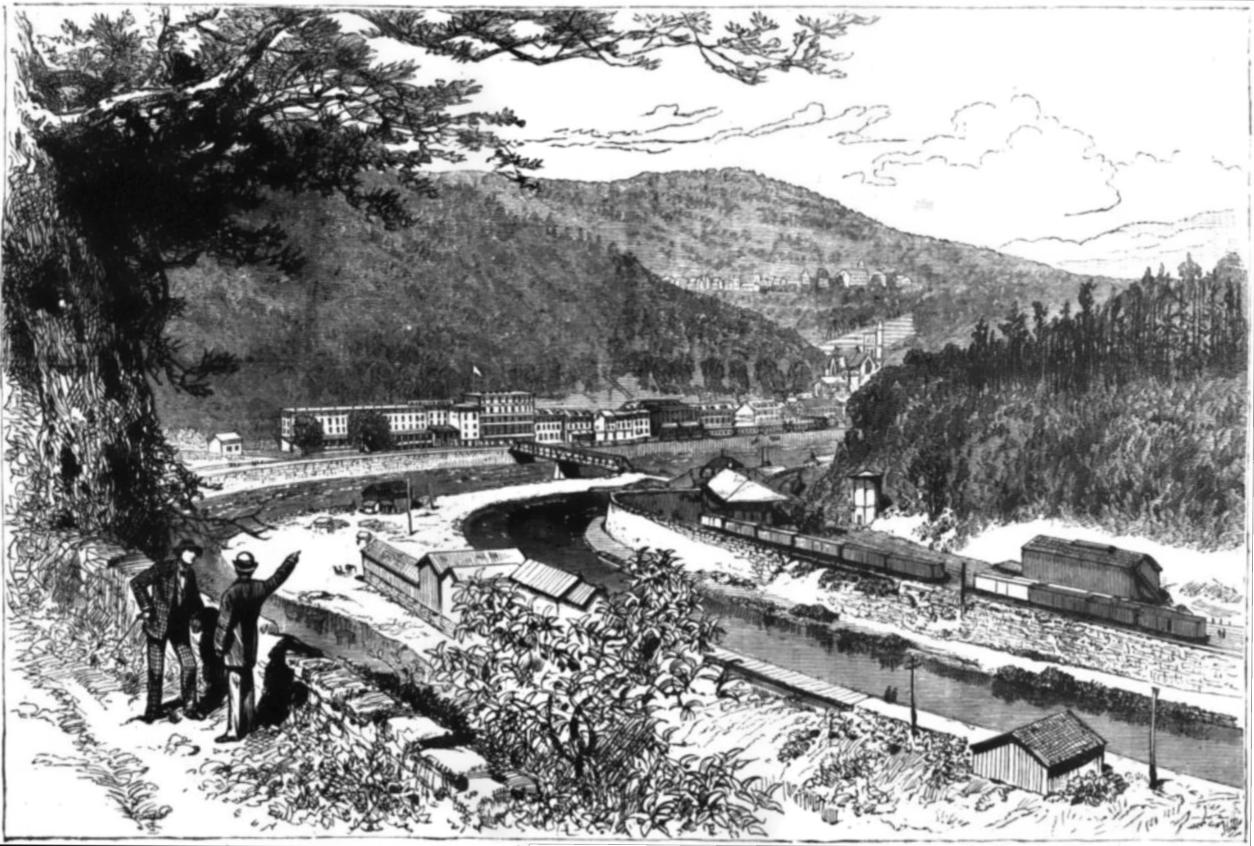
Mauch Chunk depicted in an 1880 engraving

== Notable people ==
- Edward Fister, pioneer of radar
- Hob Hiller, Major League Baseball player
- Denny Mack, Major League Baseball player and manager
- A. J. Petrucci, professional wrestler

== See also ==
Other American cities with a personal name and surname as the municipal name:

- Albert Lea, Minnesota
- Carol Stream, Illinois
- Gene Autry, Oklahoma
- George West, Texas
- Jean Lafitte, Louisiana
- Lee Vining, California
- Phil Campbell, Alabama
- Robert Lee, Texas
- Susan Moore, Alabama
- Morgan Hill, California
- Tomball, Texas (named for Texas congressman Thomas Henry Ball)
