= Cist (disambiguation) =

A cist is a small stone-built coffin-like box or ossuary used to hold the bodies of the dead.

Cist or CIST may also refer to:

- Cistaceae, a small family of plants
- CIST-FM, a radio station in Manitoba, Canada
- Common and Internal Spanning Tree; see Multiple Spanning Tree Protocol

== People ==
- Charles Cist (printer) (1738–1805), United States printer
- Charles Cist (editor) (1792–1868), United States editor
- Henry M. Cist (1839–1902), American Civil War general

== See also ==
- Cyst, a sac of tissue in the body
- O. Cist., Cistercian Order
