= Mahoning =

Mahoning may refer to:

== Communities ==
- Mahoning, Ohio, an unincorporated community in Portage County
- Mahoning County, Ohio
- Mahoning Township, Armstrong County, Pennsylvania
- Mahoning Township, Carbon County, Pennsylvania
- Mahoning Township, Lawrence County, Pennsylvania
- Mahoning Township, Montour County, Pennsylvania

== Watercourses ==
- Mahoning Creek (Allegheny River), a tributary of the Allegheny River in Pennsylvania
- Mahoning Creek (Lehigh River), a tributary of the Lehigh River in Lehigh County
- Mahoning Creek (Susquehanna River), a tributary of the Susquehanna River in Montour County
- Mahoning River, a tributary of the Beaver River in Ohio and Pennsylvania

== Other uses ==
- Mahoning Drive-In Theater, a drive-in theater in Lehighton, Pennsylvania
- Mahoning Valley, northeast Ohio and northwest Pennsylvania
