= Jacob Weiss =

Jacob Weiss (August 21, 1750 - January 9, 1839) was a Revolutionary War officer and an early coal businessman. During the Revolution, Weiss served as the Quartermaster-General under General Nathanael Greene. After the war, he and several business partners ran coal mining operations in the Lehigh Valley.

== Early life ==
Jacob Weiss was born in Philadelphia, Pennsylvania on August 21, 1750. He was the son of native German physician John Jacob Weiss, who emigrated to Philadelphia in 1740. His father became a citizen on September 27, 1740. He later married Rebecca Cox on October 14, 1746, and purchased land in the area of Fort Allen, which would become later known as Lehighton and Weissport. They had 11 children, one of whom was Jacob Weiss.

== Military career ==
Early in his military career, Jacob Weiss served for the first company of the Philadelphia Volunteers under Captain Cadwalader. He was then appointed acting Quartermaster-General by General Mifflin. After only serving one tour of duty, he was appointed Quartermaster-General and served under General Nathanael Greene of the Continental Army. After serving under Gen. Greene, Weiss was assigned a post in 1780 as the Deputy Quartermaster General in Easton, Northampton County, Pennsylvania. This was under considerable recommendation of his previous post served under General Greene. His last move of the service was in 1780 to a place called Nazareth, Pennsylvania, with his family. Weiss then concluded service there in 1783. He returned to his home in the Lehigh Valley and purchased a tract of land next to the Lehigh River, then called New Gnadenhuetton, from the Moravians who lived there.

== Coal Industry founding father ==
According to local historians, Philip Ginder, often called Ginter, made the early discovery of coal in this remote area in 1791. Ginder was a local miller who was out hunting along "Sharpe Mountain" and found an outcrop of a hard rock that was called "stone coal", or anthracite, which he recognized as possibly being coal. To verify this discovery, Mr. Ginder gave it to Col. Weiss the very next day. Col. Weiss said he would give Mr. Ginder 300 acres (1.2 km^{2}) of land if he showed where the coal was found, and Mr. Ginder agreed to the deal. Col. Weiss took the specimen by horseback to Philadelphia and had it further inspected by John Nicholson, Michael Hillegas, and brother-in-law Charles Cist (printer); Hillegas had been the Treasurer of the United States under the Continental Congress through the American Revolution. Upon authentication, Weiss was authorized to grant Ginter what he propositioned for his discovery upon pointing out the exact location where it was found. Ginter built a mill on the tract of land he acquired but was later deprived of it by the owner who had filed a prior claim at the US patent office.

Weiss, Hillegas, and Nicholson in 1791-92 were some of the original investors in the Lehigh Coal & Navigation Company (LCMC) which was later part of the historic merger which formed the influential and historically important Lehigh Coal & Navigation Company (LC&N)—anthracite was known of, but it was not known well. How to get 'Stone Coal' to burn easily or reliably was another question, yet the Eastern Seaboard was suffering the same sort of deforestation that had occasioned the use of coal in Great Britain. Unlike Europe, the young American nation did not have millennium of commerce to wear cart navigable, if poor and muddy, roads between cities. Most roads were still trails unfriendly to any vehicle with axles. Travel by water was the only fast way to get anywhere, and the only effective way to ship heavy or bulky goods, and anthracite coal was both.

Meanwhile, infant American industries and the wealthy in the other former colonies were importing fuels. Companies were even shipping coal from England and Virginia for American cities to use for heat or power. Early on in 1792 this new LCMC company attempted to be the first that regularly brought coal down from Summit Hill, Pennsylvania across Pisgah Ridge in the rough terrains typical of the ridge channeled mountainous areas of the Southern Anthracite Coal Region of Northeast Pennsylvania. The trip down from the mine necessitated the use of pack mules and then later with some road improvements, oxen and carts to transship the sacks or baskets of coal down hill 8–9 miles (12.9–14.5 km) to load the coal into sturdy boats, probably along the river banks now occupied by the village of Packerton at the mouth of Beaverdam Run or along the nearly parallel Mahoning Creek (which bisects nearby Lehighton)—both are right bank tributaries on the Lehigh River on the opposite shore from Colonel Weiss's Weissport, Pennsylvania.

Getting the anthracite mined and then down to the Lehigh River; a right bank tributary of the Delaware River, and so a way down to Philadelphia or even the relatively nearby Iron foundries of Allentown and Bethlehem was only part of the transportation problem & solution— for the river had spates of rapids and was infamously treacherous. As recently as 1817 3 of 5 barges foundered on their way down the river, an event which triggered the founding of the 'Lehigh Navigation Company', and occasion a new management team taking over the LCMC in 1818—this eventually led (1820) to the formation of the company which built the Lehigh Canal and the America's second railroad when the LCMC couldn't deliver coal regularly nor reliably.

== Later life ==
Weiss died in Weissport, Pennsylvania on January 9, 1839.
