= Charles Cist =

Charles Cist may refer to:

- Charles Cist (printer) (1738–1805), United States printer
- Charles Cist (editor) (1792–1868), United States editor
