= Pleasant Corners, Carbon County, Pennsylvania =

Unincorporated community in Pennsylvania, US

Pleasant Corners, Pennsylvania
- Unincorporated community
- Location within Pennsylvania
- Coordinates: 40°48′38″N 75°46′46″W
- Country: United States
- State: Pennsylvania
- County: Carbon
- Township: Mahoning
- Elevation: 597 ft (182 m)
- Time zone: UTC-5 (Eastern (EST))
  - Summer (DST): UTC-4 (EDT)
- Area codes: 570 and 272
- GNIS feature ID: 1184004

Pleasant Corners is an unincorporated community located in Mahoning Township in Carbon County, Pennsylvania. Pleasant Corners is located on Pennsylvania Route 902 between Normal Square and Lehighton.
