= Carbon Transit =

Public transit agency in Pennsylvania, US

- Headquarters: 46 East Locust Street; Nesquehoning, Pennsylvania, U.S.
- Service area: Carbon County, Pennsylvania, U.S.
- Service type: Bus service
- Routes: 3 fixed routes, 3 flex routes
- Website: http://carbontransit.com

Carbon Transit (CT) is a public transit agency providing bus service in Carbon County in the U.S. state of Pennsylvania. The agency operates fixed-route and flex bus service, which connects points within the county, and Shared Ride paratransit service. Carbon Transit is administered by the LANta under contract with Carbon County and is operated by Easton Coach Company.

== Services ==
Carbon Transit operates fixed-route bus service called CT Bus, which consists of three routes serving points in Carbon County along with service to Whitehall. The routes operate on different days during the week. CT Flex is a reservation-based on-demand shared ride service consisting of three routes serving various areas of the county on different days of the week. CT operates Shared Ride paratransit service in Carbon County for persons who are unable to use fixed-route bus service. Paratransit trips must be made through advance reservations.

== CT Bus routes ==
CT operates the following CT Bus routes:

Route	Line Name	Terminals		Places Served	Notes
701	Nesquehoning/Lehighton	Nesquehoning	Lehighton	Lansford, Summit Hill, Jim Thorpe, Lehighton, Carbon Plaza Mall	operates Monday, Wednesday, and Friday
702	Nesquehoning/Whitehall	Nesquehoning	Whitehall	Lansford, Summit Hill, Jim Thorpe, Lehighton, Carbon Plaza Mall, Bowmanstown, Palmerton, Walnutport	operates Monday and Friday
703	Nesquehoning/Lehighton	Nesquehoning	Weissport	Lansford, Summit Hill, Jim Thorpe, Lehighton, Carbon Plaza Mall	operates Wednesday

=== List of CT Flex Routes ===
CT operates the following CT Flex routes:

Route	Description	Notes
751	Mauch Chunk Lake Park, Jim Thorpe, East Side, Penn Forest, Kidder	operates Monday-Friday
752	Palmerton, Bowmanstown, Weissport, Lehighton, and Jim Thorpe	operates Tuesday and Thursday
753	Lansford, Summit Hill, Nesquehoning, Jim Thorpe, Weissport, and Lehighton	operates Tuesday and Thursday

== Fares ==
For fixed-route service, the base fare is $1.50 for trips within or between Carbon and Schuylkill counties. Children age 5 and under with a fare-paying adult and senior citizens age 65 and over with a Senior Citizen ID or Medicare Card ride for free. Persons with disabilities ride for half fare with a PennDOT Reduced Fare Card or Medicare Card.

For the Shared Ride paratransit services, fares are distance-base and full fares range from $27.00 for trips less than 7 miles (11 km) to $56.00 for trips more than 35 miles (56 km). Self-pay consumers ride paratransit for 15% of the full fare while Carbon County Area Agency on Aging consumers ride paratransit for 5% of the full-fare. Americans with Disabilities Act (ADA)-sponsored riders ride paratransit for 15% of the full fare with the fare not exceeding $4.59 for trips more than 14 miles (23 km).
