= Pleasant Corners =

Pleasant Corners can refer to the following unincorporated communities in Pennsylvania:

- Pleasant Corners, Carbon County, Pennsylvania
- Pleasant Corners, Lehigh County, Pennsylvania
