= Mauch Chunk Lake =

Water reservoir in Pennsylvania, U.S.

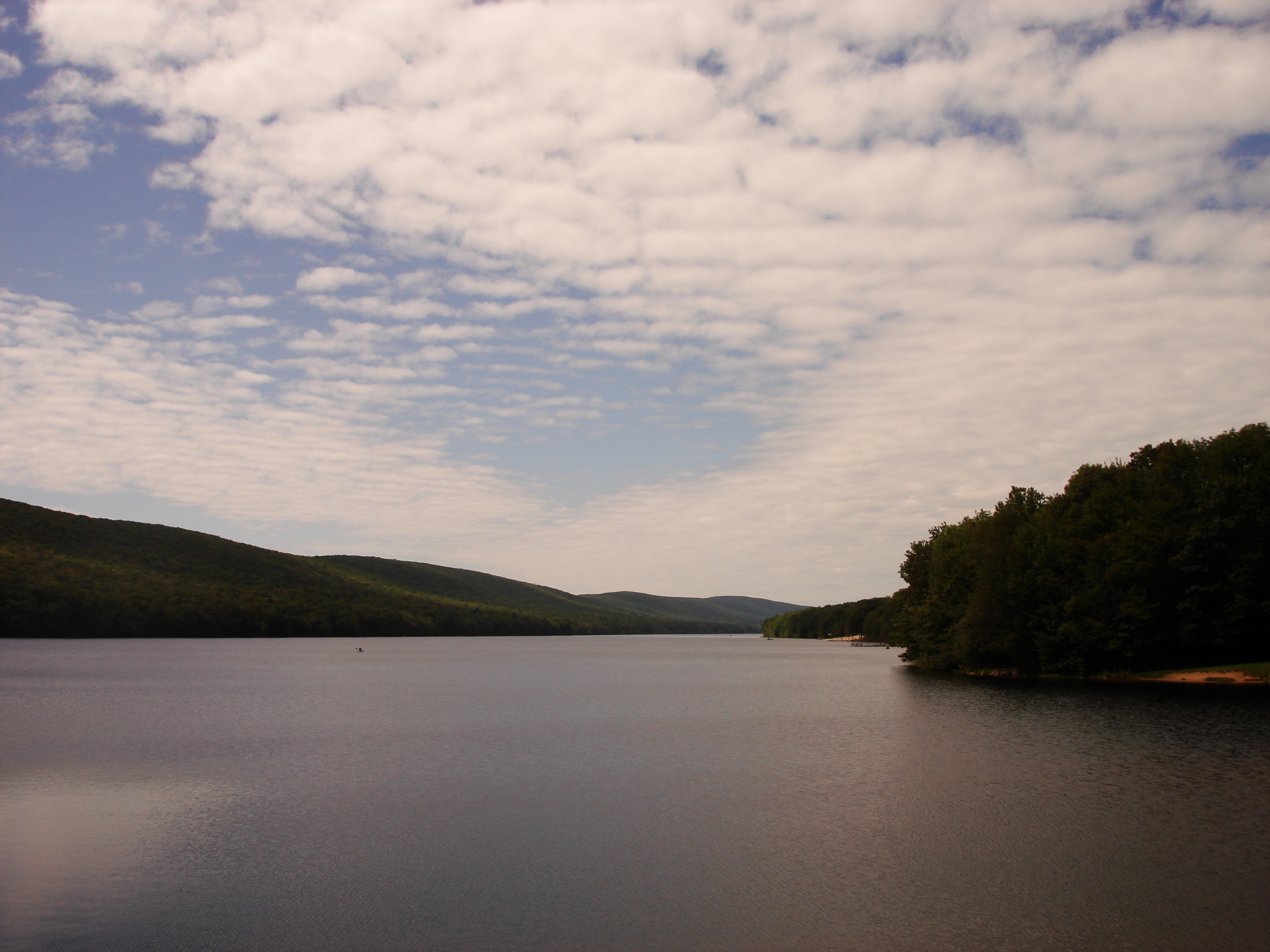
- Mauch Chunk Lake

- Location within Pennsylvania Location within the United States
- Interactive map of Mauch Chunk Lake
- Location: Jim Thorpe, Pennsylvania
- Coordinates: 40°50′05″N 75°49′04″W
- Type: Reservoir
- Primary inflows: Mauch Chunk Creek
- Primary outflows: White Bear Creek
- Basin countries: United States
- Built: 1972
- Construction engineer: United States Army Corps of Engineers
- Max. length: 2.8 miles (4.5 km)
- Surface area: 320 acres (130 ha)
- Max. depth: 40 feet (12 m)
- Surface elevation: 1,007 feet (307 m)
- References: U.S. Geological Survey Geographic Names Information System: Mauch Chunk Lake

The Mauch Chunk Lake a reservoir in Jim Thorpe, Pennsylvania created by damming the White Bear Creek designed by the United States Army Corps of Engineers in early 1972. Constructed as a 50 foot (15 m) high earthen dam 1,710 feet (520 m) long and holds a 320 acres (130 ha) reservoir. It was officially opened in the summer of 1974, at a cost of $3 million, which would be $18 million in today's money. It was commissioners Agnes T. McCartney and Rep. Daniel Flood who oversaw the venture. The lake is part of Mauch Chunk Lake Park.

Before this manmade lake was opened, the water that ran from the natural springs fed atop the Mauch Chunk Mountain was cause for alarm for the Mauch Chunk Creek. There were a number of floods throughout the years flooding upper and lower Broadway (the main street in Jim Thorpe). Some of the worst floods occurred in 1861, 1901, 1902, and in 1969. One of the first tests of this dam was put to the test with Hurricane Agnes in 1972, as the dam held and many of the towns near that area got up to 18 inches of rain.

== See also ==
- List of lakes in Pennsylvania
