= Mahoning Creek =

Mahoning Creek may refer to the following creeks in the U.S. state of Pennsylvania:

- Mahoning Creek (Allegheny River), a tributary of the Allegheny River
- Mahoning Creek (Lehigh River), a tributary of the Lehigh River in Lehigh County
- Mahoning Creek (Susquehanna River), a tributary of the Susquehanna River in Montour County

== See also ==
- Mahoning River, in Ohio and Pennsylvania
