= Jessie Nelson (disambiguation) =

Jessie Nelson is an American film producer, director, and writer.

Jessie Nelson or similar spellings may also refer to:

- Jesy Nelson (born 1991), British singer
- Jesse Nelson, member of the Exhumed Films film organization
- Jessie Nelson, keyboardist in Head Automatica

== See also ==
- Jessica Nelson (disambiguation)
