= Jessica Nelson =

Jessica Nelson may refer to:

- Jesy Nelson (born 1991), Jessica Louise Nelson, British singer
- Jessica Nelson (American football), player for Miami Caliente
- Jessica Nelson (filmmaker), producer of Pink Eye (film)
- Jessica Nelson, co-founder of SP Books

== See also ==
- Jessica Nelson North, poet
- Jessie Nelson (disambiguation)
