= Times-News =

Times-News may refer to:

- Times-News (Idaho), a newspaper published in Twin Falls, Idaho
- Times-News (Burlington, North Carolina), a newspaper published in Burlington, North Carolina
- Times-News (Hendersonville, North Carolina), a newspaper published in Hendersonville, North Carolina
- Times News (Pennsylvania), a newspaper published in Lehighton, Pennsylvania
- The Times-News (Utah), a newspaper published in Nephi, Utah
- Cumberland Times-News, a newspaper published in Cumberland, Maryland
- Erie Times-News, a newspaper published in Erie, Pennsylvania
- Kingsport Times-News, a newspaper published in Kingsport, Tennessee
