= TromaDance =

American film festival, founded 1999

TromaDance Film Festival
- Location: Park City and Salt Lake City, Utah (1999-2009); Asbury Park, New Jersey (2010-2013); New York City, New York (2014-2019); Mahoning Drive-In Theater (2020-present)
- Established: 1999
- Festival date: Mid-January, concurrent with the Sundance Film Festival (1999-2009); Mid-April (2010-present)
- Website: www.tromadance.com

The TromaDance Film Festival is a free annual independent non-competitive film festival organized by Troma Entertainment. Founded in 1999, TromaDance was originally held in Park City and Salt Lake City, Utah, operating concurrently alongside the Sundance Film Festival in order to showcase an independent alternative to Sundance's perceived mainstream offerings. Between 2010 and 2013, the festival had been relocated to various locations throughout New Jersey. Since 2014, TromaDance has relocated to New York City, and Mahoning Drive-In Theater.

== Overview ==
TromaDance advertises itself as "the first and only film festival of the people, for the people, and by the people", dedicated to "bringing independent art back to the people". In direct opposition to Sundance, TromaDance doesn't charge an entry fee for filmmakers to submit their films and doesn't charge admission fees for people to attend the film screenings. Although Troma themselves are notorious for their violent low-budget horror films, TromaDance showcases both shorts and features of varying genres and formats, including comedy, drama, documentary, animation and experimental film, though horror, fantasy and sci-fi usually make up a significant portion of the entries.

TromaDance is primarily funded by donations, and the festival's employees and volunteers are entirely unpaid. TromaDance has been sponsored over the years by Filmmaker Magazine, G4, Jägermeister, Kodak, MovieMaker Magazine, PETA, Rue Morgue Magazine, SLUG Magazine, and Stella Artois. Troma also sponsors fan-organized events called TromaPaloozas, music festivals that serve as fundraisers for TromaDance. TromaPaloozas have been held in Denver, Las Vegas, Minneapolis, Murfreesboro, and Tulsa.

== History ==
The idea for TromaDance was developed by Troma president Lloyd Kaufman, who got the idea from South Park co-creator Trey Parker (whose debut film, Cannibal! The Musical, was distributed by Troma). Feeling that Sundance had become too "Hollywood" by charging high entry fees, showing multimillion-dollar "independent" movies and practicing an elitist structure and film selection process, Parker urged Kaufman to create his own film festival that was the direct independent opposite of Sundance, one that was completely free and focused on independently produced film that was made without the Hollywood system in order to give first-time filmmakers a chance at getting their work seen.

Troma has released five volumes of "The Best of TromaDance", DVDs of selected shorts each from two years worth of the festival. The press conference for the 2005 festival held in October 2004 featured the introduction of the official TromaDance Theme Song by longtime Troma character Count Smokula.

== "Satellite" TromaDance festivals ==
- TromaDance DVD Collections (2002–present)
- TromaDance Portland (in Portland, OR) (2004)
- Tromafling (in Edinburgh) (2005)
- Tromanale (in Berlin) (2005–2006)
- TromaDance North (in Winnipeg) (2006)
- TromaDance New Mexico (in Albuquerque) (2006–present)
- TromaDance Indiana (in Franklin, IN) (2007–present)
- Tromadance Detroit (2013–present)

== See also ==
- List of fantastic and horror film festivals
- European Fantastic Film Festivals Federation
