= Pennsylvania Route 902 =

State highway in Carbon County, Pennsylvania, US

Pennsylvania Route 902

Route information
- Maintained by PennDOT
- Length: 11.662 mi (18.768 km)

Major junctions
- West end: US 209 in Lansford
- East end: PA 443 in Lehighton

Location
- Country: United States
- State: Pennsylvania
- Counties: Carbon

Highway system
- Pennsylvania State Route System; Interstate; US; State; Scenic; Legislative
← PA 901	→ PA 903

Pennsylvania Route 902 (PA 902) is an 11.66-mile-long (18.76 km) east–west state highway in Carbon County in the U.S. state of Pennsylvania. The route runs from U.S. Route 209 (US 209) in Lansford southeast to PA 443 in Lehighton. The highway is a two-lane undivided road its entire length. From Lansford, PA 902 heads southeast passes through Summit Hill before crossing two mountains and entering the Mahoning Valley. The route turns east at New Mahoning and continues to Lehighton, where it turns south to end at PA 443 in the western part of the borough. The route was designated between US 209 near Summit Hill and New Mahoning in 1928. PA 902 was extended east to US 209/US 309 in the center of Lehighton in the 1930s and rerouted to end at PA 443 in the 1980s.

== Route description ==
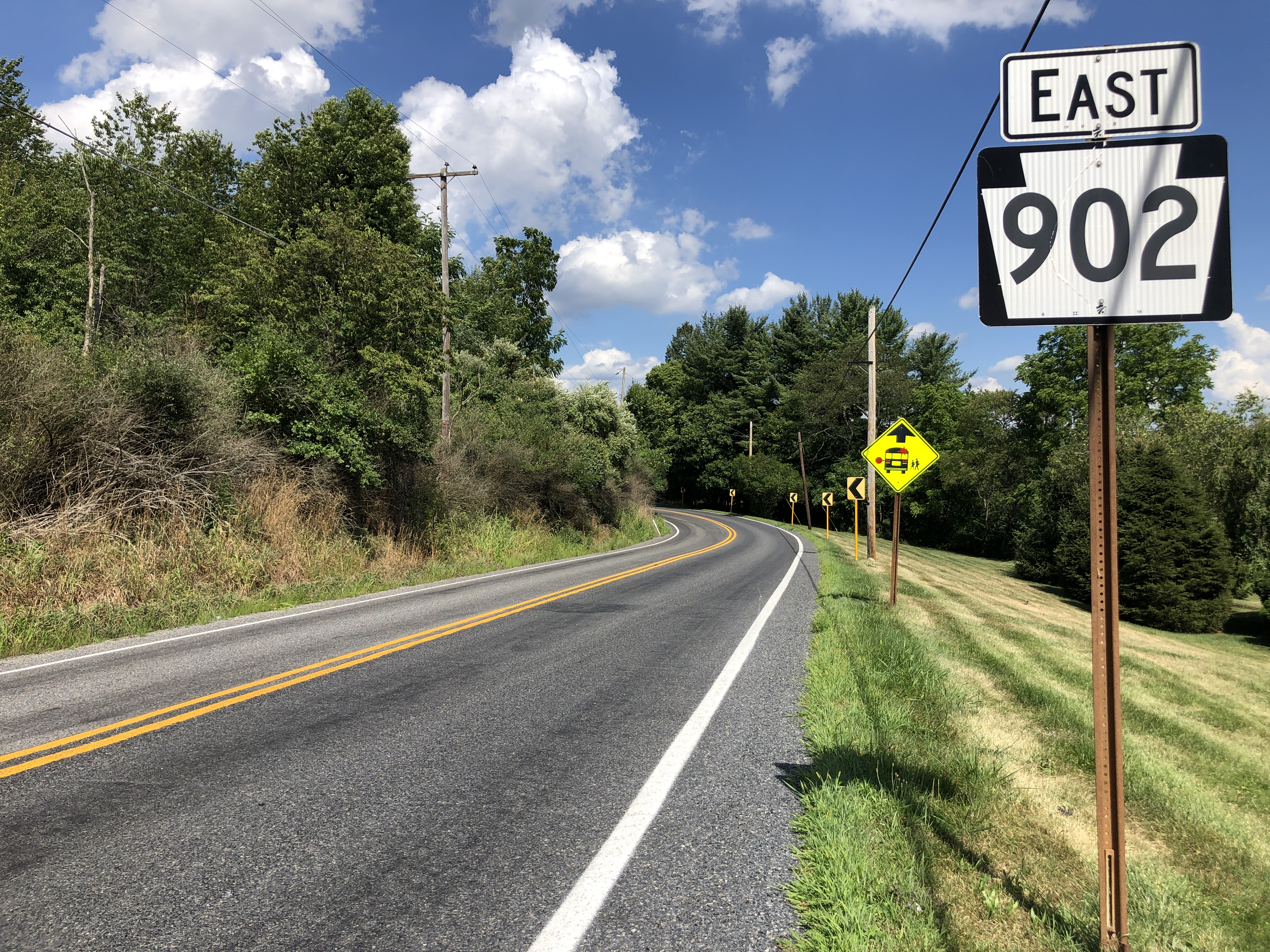
PA 902 eastbound in Mahoning Township

PA 902 begins at an intersection with US 209 in the borough of Lansford in Carbon County, heading south along two-lane undivided Spring Garden Street past homes. The route turns east into forests, entering the borough of Summit Hill as North Street. The road curves south as Pine Street and runs past more residences. PA 902 turns east onto Laurel Street and winds southeast across forested Pisgah Mountain. The road turns south before it bends back to the southeast and traverses Mauch Chunk Mountain. The route leaves Summit Hill for Mahoning Township, where the name becomes Mill Road and it enters the agricultural Mahoning Valley. PA 902 reaches the community of New Mahoning and turns northeast onto Mahoning Drive West, running through a mix of farmland and woodland with some homes. The road continues through the rural valley, passing through the community of Pleasant Corners. The route enters the borough of Lehighton, where the name becomes Mahoning Street and it runs through residential areas with some commercial establishments, passing north of Lehighton Area High School. PA 902 turns south onto Ninth Street, passing more development before crossing Mahoning Creek and coming to its eastern terminus at PA 443.

== History ==
When Pennsylvania first legislated routes in 1911, present-day PA 902 was not given a number. PA 902 was designated in 1928 to run from US 209 near Summit Hill southeast to New Mahoning along a paved road. At this time, the road between New Mahoning and Lehighton existed as a paved unnumbered road. PA 902 was extended east from New Mahoning to US 209/US 309 in Lehighton in the 1930s, following Mahoning Drive and Mahoning Street. In the 1980s, PA 902 was rerouted to follow Ninth Street to its current eastern terminus at PA 443.

== Major intersections ==
The entire route is in Carbon County.

Location	mi	km	Destinations	Notes
Lansford	0.000	0.000	US 209 (Patterson Street) – Tamaqua, Nesquehoning	Western terminus
Lehighton	11.662	18.768	PA 443 (Blakeslee Boulevard) – Allentown, Tamaqua, Schuylkill Haven	Eastern terminus
1.000 mi = 1.609 km; 1.000 km = 0.621 mi
