= Jake Arner Memorial Airport =

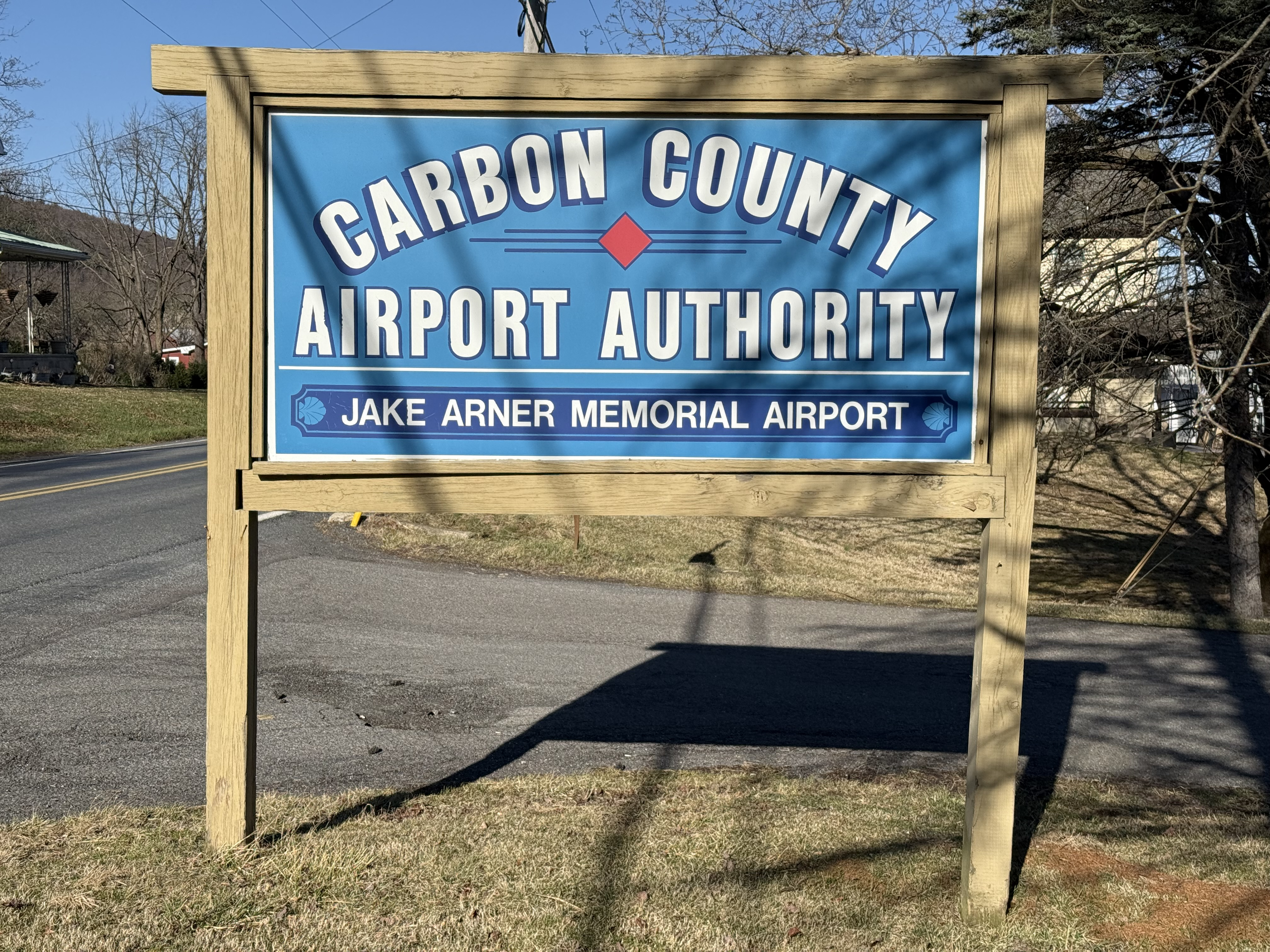
- Sign for the airport along PA 902
- IATA: none; ICAO: none; FAA LID: 22N

Summary
- Airport type: Public
- Owner: Carbon County Airport Authority
- Operator: Carbon County Airport Authority
- Serves: Lehighton, Pennsylvania
- Location: Mahoning Township, Carbon County, Pennsylvania
- Opened: 1964; 62 years ago
- Passenger services ceased: 1977; 49 years ago
- Elevation AMSL: 534 ft / 163 m
- Coordinates: 40.8095089°N 75.7614964°W

Map
- Location of airport in Pennsylvania Jake Arner Memorial Airport (the United States)

Runways
Direction	Length		Surface
Direction	ft	m	Surface
8/26	3,000	914	asphalt

Statistics (2015)
- Based aircraft: 35
- Aircraft operations: 13,149 ▲

Jake Arner Memorial Airport (FAA LID: 22N) is a public non-towered airport located in Mahoning Township, Carbon County, Pennsylvania. It serves Lehighton, Pennsylvania and the surrounding areas. The airport is home to 35 based aircraft as of 2015, and has about 13,000 aircraft movements every calendar year. It was surveyed at an elevation of 534 ft and 163 m above sea level.

== History ==
=== Founding and beginning of Jet Age ===
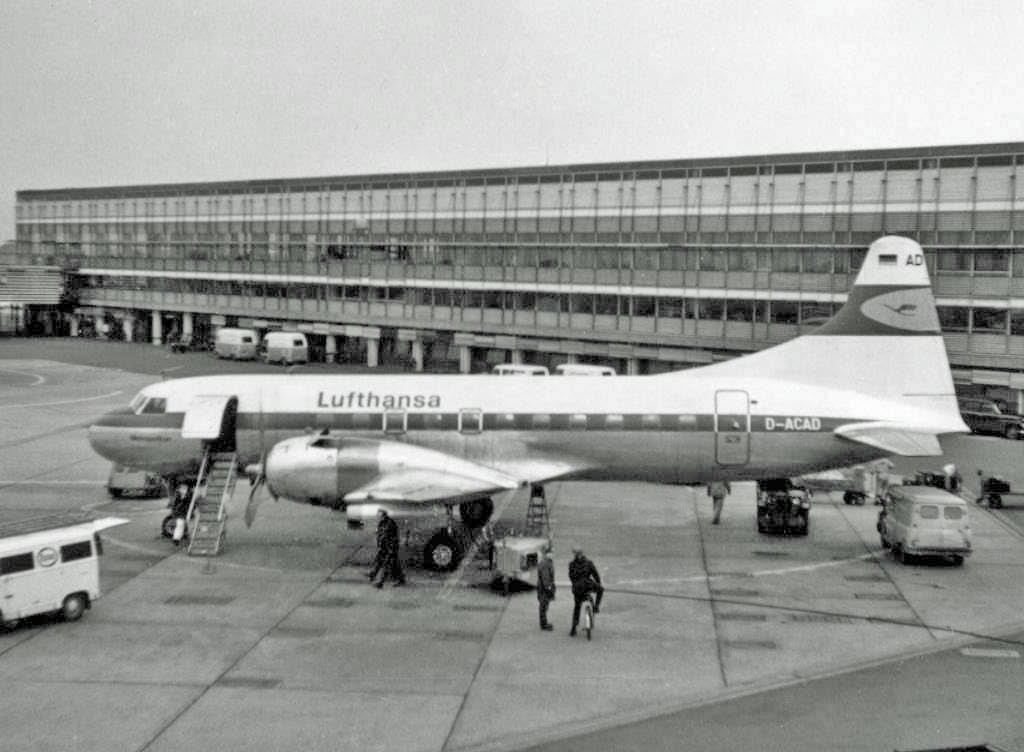
The Convair 440 the primary aircraft flown to Lehighton in the 60s and 70s (This one belonging to Lufthansa in Frankfurt in 1968)

Jake Arner Memorial Airport was open in December 1964 and was named Lehighton Municipal Airport at the time. The airport flourished in its beginning years; it was a military and commercial airport until commercial service was dropped in 1977. During its relatively brief 10 years of commercial service, the airport saw service from Eastern Air Lines, launched in Spring of 1967, flew Convair 440 Metropolitan daily to Philadelphia via Philadelphia International Airport. Although the founding of the airport was in the midst of the Jet Age in aviation there were very few commercial jets flying into Lehighton. And due to low passenger numbers, an increase in jet fuel and competition of airlines Eastern pulled out of Lehighton after a little over 10 years in 1977.

=== Modern use ===
There have been no commercial scheduled flights to Lehighton in 40 years. Currently, Jake Arner Memorial Airport is a general aviation airport.

== Aircraft movements ==
Jake Arner Memorial Airport has had 13,149 aircraft movements in the calendar year or 2015 at a rate of approximately 36 movements per day. The aircraft movements are broken down into percentage form: 77% local general aviation, 19% transient general aviation, 2% military, 2% air taxi. And of the 35 aircraft based on the field in 2015, 27 are Single engine airplanes, 6 are Multi engine airplanes, with one helicopter and one glider.

=== Aircraft movements by year ===
Year	Movements	Change
2010	11,367	N/A
2011	11,123	▼ -244
2012	14,410	▲ +3,287
2013	12,111	▼ -2,299
2014	13,009	▲ +898
2015	13,149	▲ +140
2016	TBA No data	

All data per Federal Aviation Administration (FAA)

== See also ==
- List of airports in Pennsylvania
