= Mahoning Drive-In Theater =

Drive-in theater in Lehighton, Pennsylvania

- Interactive map of Mahoning Drive-In Theater
- Address: 635 Seneca Rd; Lehighton, Pennsylvania, 18235; United States
- Coordinates: 40°48′31″N 75°46′17″W
- Type: Drive-in

Construction
- Opened: 1949

Website
- https://www.mahoningdit.com/

The Mahoning Drive-In Theater is a drive-in theater located in Lehighton, Pennsylvania, along Route 443 in Mahoning Township. Opened in 1949, the Mahoning was one of many drive-in theaters that became popular in the United States following World War II. Attendance at the Mahoning waned by 2014, but the theater has since gained a resurgence in popularity due to the management's decision to screen primarily older cult films and B movies rather than newer releases. It is the last remaining drive-in theater in the US to screen films in 35 mm every weekend.

== History ==
The Mahoning Drive-In Theater opened on April 29, 1949, with space for 75 cars, amidst a wave of drive-in theaters that became popular in the US after World War II. A preview showing the night before drew 500 attendees. According to Gene DeSantis, the theater's manager circa 1988, the first film screened at the Mahoning was 1948's April Showers. The first season screened films every night of the week and admission was 50 cents.

Though drive-in attendance declined across the country with the advent of multiplex theaters in the 1970s and 1980s, the Mahoning remained in operation. In 1997, owner Joe Farruggio courted controversy when he threatened to screen Deep Throat and Debbie Does Dallas following multiple rejected zoning applications to build two additional screens. Mahoning Township required the theater to get approval from the Federal Aviation Administration to build the additional screens because of their proximity to an airport, which they did not receive. Police were present before the Friday night screening to confiscate the films, had they been visible from the road, but Farruggio instead elected to show Mimic and Cop Land. The drive-in was only open for two weeks that year.

In 1999, Michael and Deb Danchak began leasing the drive-in from Farruggio. Jeff Mattox began working at the theater in 2001 as projectionist and took over operations in 2002. The theater operated on weekends only and began showing vintage trailers alongside modern releases. On a good weekend, the theater was estimated to receive 100 cars.

In September 2013, the Danchaks attempted to raise funds to purchase a digital projector, as major studios announced they would stop distributing new releases in 35mm. The effort was unsuccessful and in 2014 Mattox took over ownership of the business. Mattox also attempted to raise funds to buy a digital projector, and a later New York Times piece noted that 2014 attendance was low, sometimes with as few as 10 cars per show.

Jeff Mattox decided, at the suggestion of then-volunteer employees Virgil Cardamone and Matt McClanahan, that the Mahoning would screen primarily older cult films and B movies, as opposed to newer releases. The decision proved successful, and attendance at the Mahoning soon rose in accordance with the addition of Exhumed Films themed programs like the recurring "Zombie Fest"—a marathon of films featuring zombies—and "Camp Blood"—a marathon of horror films set at summer camps. Films are commonly shown as double or triple features at the Mahoning, and are often accompanied by screenings of older trailers, other vintage advertisements, and themed sets and costumes by production head James T. Mills. The Mahoning has gone on to host events for Shudder, Joe Bob Briggs, and Troma Entertainment, in which Mills has gone on to portray their mascot, The Toxic Avenger, for since 2020.

On July 13, 2021, it was announced that the land on which the theater is situated was optioned by a solar power company, Greenskies Clean Energy LLC, which planned to demolish the Mahoning (including its screen and marquee) and construct a solar farm in its place. Following an outpouring of community support, the plans have been put on hold. In 2024, Mattox passed away less than two weeks before its 75th season was set to begin. Ticket sales and the season opening were paused while the theater's staff sought a way to continue without a business owner. On May 10, 2024, the season began under the operation of Cardamone. The night included a memorial video to Mattox titled, "The Man Behind the Curtain."

== Location and facilities ==
The screen, marquee, concessions building, ticket booth, and projector are all original to the Mahoning, although changes and repairs have been made over the years. The original Mahoning screen was built in 1947 by Bethlehem Steel and measured 70 feet. By 1958 it measured 100 feet and has now expanded to 110 feet. Two weeks before the 2019 season opening, the screen was significantly damaged and underwent approximately $20,000 repairs. The marquee sits at the intersection of Route 443 and Seneca Road to point cars towards the theater entrance a half mile away. In 2018, it was severely damaged by weather and a GoFundMe campaign was launched to help raise the nearly $20,000 it cost to repair the sign. To commemorate the repaired marquee, drive-in volunteers placed a time capsule in one of the posts.

The concessions building also houses the projector room and bathroom. The projectors were manufactured in 1947 and have been used at the theater since it opened. 35 mm prints are sourced from studios, private collectors, and university libraries. Exhumed Films is also a regular source for prints. The concessions building housed cigarette and pinball machines (both of which were robbed in the 50s and 60s). The mural on the concessions stand was painted by Christian Egbert in 2016, who first learned about the drive-in after meeting staff at a local flea market. Mattox paid for the materials and Egbert was given a place to sell his paintings in exchange for the labor.

On July 18, 2026, the theater's marquee was discovered to have been vandalized overnight by unknown individuals after a showing of the Troma films Citizen Toxie, Tromeo and Juliet, and Beware! Children at Play, as part of Troma-Thon 2026. The marquee was quickly cleaned up and restored by volunteers, but the second night ended up being cancelled.

The Mahoning Drive-In is one of three drive-in movie theaters in the Lehigh Valley, the other two being Becky's Drive-In Theatre and Shankweiler's Drive-In Theatre (the oldest operational drive-in in the country, now operated by former Mahoning volunteer owner Matt McClanahan).
