= Harwan Theatre =

Movie theatre in Mount Ephraim, New Jersey

Coordinates: 39.8810°N 75.0868°W

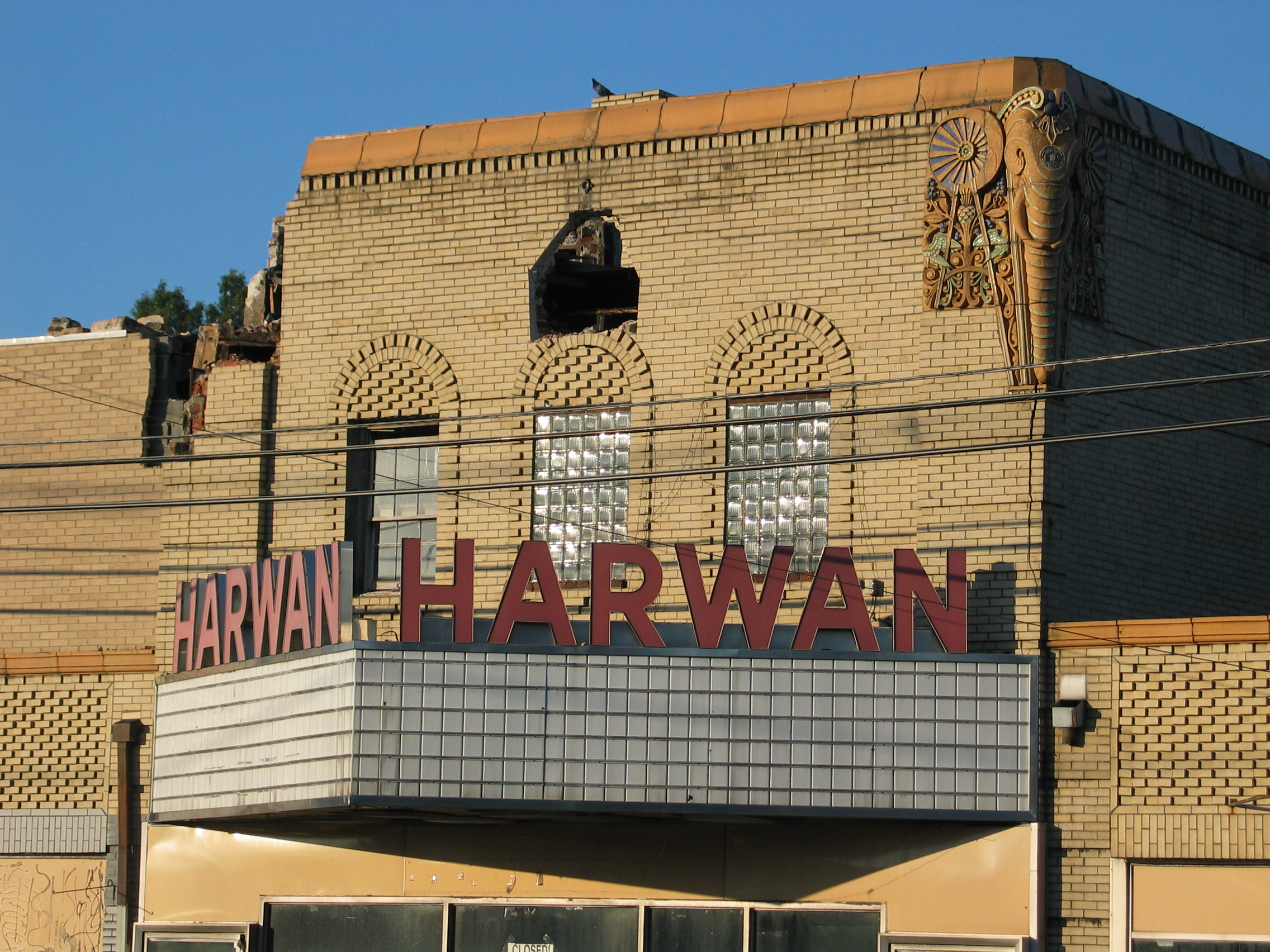
Harwan Theatre, during demolition, 2006

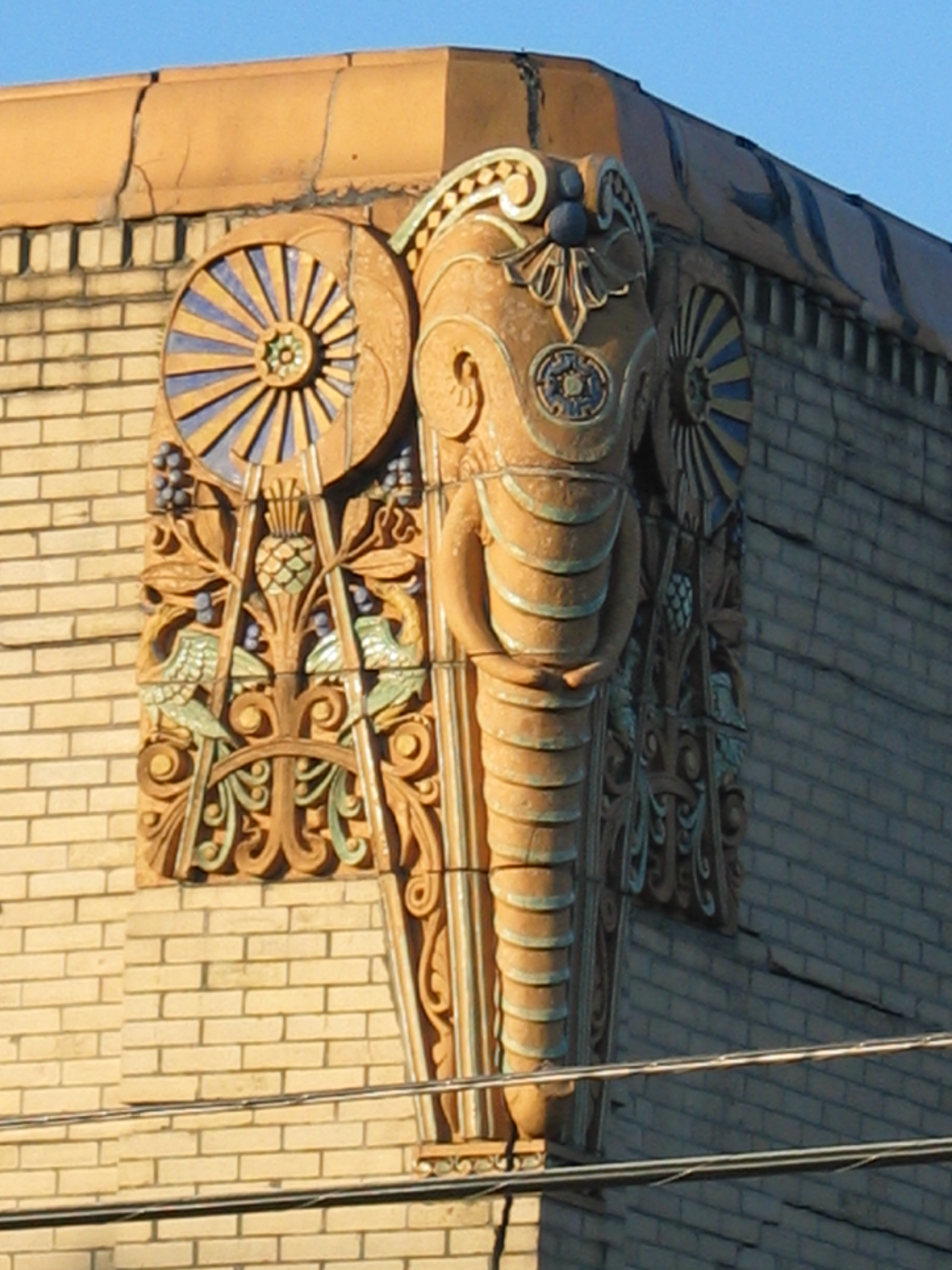
Harwan Theatre, during demolition, detail, 2006

The Harwan Theatre was a movie theatre in Mount Ephraim, New Jersey. Originally known as the Mount Ephraim Theatre, it was built in 1929 at the corner of the Black Horse Pike and Kings Highway, and first opened on Thanksgiving Day in 1930. The original owners, Elias and Eva Harwan, named it the Mount Ephraim Theatre; it was renamed the Harwan Theatre when it was sold in 1968.

It was originally a vaudeville theatre, with a stage, a single screen and 600 seats. It was torn down in February 2007, along with the rest of the block; a Walgreens pharmacy and parking lot has been constructed there. Walgreens closed the location in 2025.

The South Jersey theater was later popular for its weekly showing of the Rocky Horror Picture Show. From 1994 until 1999, The Harwan was the principal venue for Exhumed Films.
