= Melchior Steiner =

American printer

Melchior Steiner was an American printer who had learned his trade under John Henry Miller. He was the son of Reformed Church pastor Conrad Steiner. The family is believed to have moved to the Thirteen Colonies from Switzerland, settling in Philadelphia.

After completing an apprenticeship with the United Lutheran Ministry's printing operation, Steiner formed a partnership with Charles Cist, a Moravian American originally from St. Petersburg. For nearly two years Cist and Steiner published the Philadelphisches Staatsregister, which was very similar to other contemporary papers like Die Pennsylvanische Gazette published by John Dunlap, and Das Pennsylvanische Zeitungs-Blat, published while the British were still occupying Philadelphia during the first half of 1778. The first issue of Philadelphisches Staatsregister was published on July 21, 1779. By then, it may have been the only German language paper in America. Steiner and Cist dissolved their partnership in 1781. Steiner went on to publish Gemeinnützige Philadelphische Correspondenz.

Melchior died in 1807.
