= Henry M. Cist =

American lawyer

Henry Martyn Cist
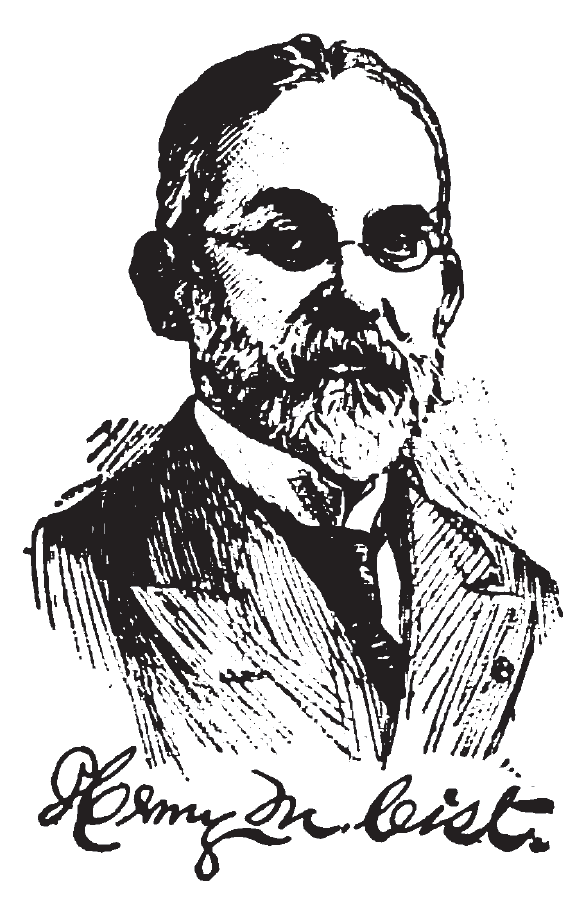
- Born: February 20, 1839; Cincinnati, Ohio, U.S.
- Died: December 16, 1902 (aged 63); Rome, Italy
- Burial place: Spring Grove Cemetery, Cincinnati, Ohio, U.S.
- Military career
- Allegiance: United States; Union
- Branch: Union Army
- Service years: 1861–1866
- Rank: Captain; Brevet Brigadier General
- Commands: none
- Conflicts: American Civil War; Battle of Shiloh; Battle of Stone's River; Battle of Chickamauga; Third Battle of Chattanooga
- Other work: author, lawyer, politician

Henry Martyn Cist (February 20, 1839 – December 16, 1902) was an American soldier, lawyer, and author who was a Union Army captain and staff officer during the American Civil War. On December 11, 1866, he was nominated and on February 6, 1867, he was confirmed for appointment to the grade of brevet brigadier general of volunteers, to rank from March 13, 1865. He is most noted for his classic and oft-referenced 1882 book The Army of the Cumberland. In addition, Cist led pioneering efforts to preserve and interpret the sites of the battles of Chickamauga and Chattanooga.

== Early life and career ==
Henry Cist was born in Cincinnati, Ohio, the younger of two sons of Philadelphia-born author Charles Cist and his wife Janet. His paternal grandfather, also named Charles Cist, was an immigrant from St. Petersburg, Russia, and a printer and publisher in Philadelphia.

Cist graduated from Farmers College in 1858, and then studied law. He passed his bar exam and became a practicing attorney.

== Civil War service ==
With the outbreak of the Civil War, Cist enlisted as a private in the three-month 6th Ohio Infantry. When his term of enlistment expired, he was promoted to second lieutenant in the 52nd Ohio Infantry. He later served as post adjutant of Camp Chase in Columbus, Ohio, after the prisoners of war captured at Fort Donelson were transported there following Ulysses S. Grant's victory in February 1862.

In April 1862, Cist joined the 74th Ohio Infantry as a first lieutenant and became its regimental adjutant, serving under Colonel Granville Moody. He later served as the assistant adjutant general with the rank of captain on the staff of Major General William S. Rosecrans in the Army of the Cumberland. Later he was on the staff of Major General George H. Thomas.

At Maj. Gen. Thomas's request, he remained in the service after the close of hostilities to give the necessary orders and to arrange the details providing for the mustering out and disbanding of over 100,000 troops.

In the omnibus promotions issued by the War Department following the end of the Civil War, Cist received three brevet promotions ranking from March 13, 1865, to the ranks of major, colonel, and brigadier general of U. S. Volunteers. On December 11, 1866, President Andrew Johnson nominated Cist for appointment to the grade of brevet brigadier general of volunteers, to rank from March 13, 1865, and the United States Senate confirmed the appointment on February 6, 1867.

== Postbellum career ==
After mustering out of the army in January 1866, Cist returned to Cincinnati, and established a successful legal practice in that city. He briefly entered politics and lost a hotly contested election for mayor of College Hill, Ohio, that required court action to declare a winner.

In 1869 Cist was elected corresponding secretary of the Society of the Army of the Cumberland, to which office he was re-elected every year for some years afterward. He edited all but volumes ii and iii of Reports of the Society of the Army of the Cumberland (Cincinnati, 17 vols., 1868–85). In 1882, he wrote The Army of the Cumberland (New York: Charles Scribner's Sons), which was considered one of the best first-person accounts of that army. He wrote one of the earliest biographies of Union leader "Pap" Thomas, The Life of Gen. George H. Thomas. He also wrote several magazine articles related to Cincinnati during wartime. Among his article titles were "Cincinnati with the War Fever" and "The Romance of Shiloh."

Cist turned his interest in history to working to have battlefield sites preserved. He served as director of the Chickamauga Memorial Association in 1889, helping gain Congressional authorization in 1890 for the first military park, the Chickamauga and Chattanooga National Military Park. In 1892 Cist served as president of the Ohio Society, Sons of the American Revolution. It is a heritage organization devoted to celebrating the history of the US and especially the meaning of the American Revolution.

After contracting pneumonia while touring Italy, Cist died at the age of 63. He died at Rome, Italy. His body was returned to Ohio and buried in Cincinnati's Spring Grove Cemetery.

General Cist, like Generals J. D. Cox, Lytle, Mitchel and Force, mingled scholarship with their military experience, indeed they were scholars before they were soldiers. In this work we have a skilled and thorough history of the Army of the Cumberland from its formation to the end of the battles at Chattanooga, in November, 1863.

— Daniel J. Ryan, 1911

== See also ==
- List of American Civil War brevet generals (Union)
