= Mauch Chunk Creek =

River in Pennsylvania, United States

Coordinates: 40.86298°N 75.73683°W

Mauch Chunk Creek (Lenape for "at the bear mountain") is a 9.2-mile-long (14.8 km) tributary of the Lehigh River in Carbon County, Pennsylvania in the United States.

It is dammed to form Mauch Chunk Lake near the borough of Summit Hill. The upper reaches of the stream above are also known as White Bear Creek.

Mauch Chunk Creek winds between the valley of Mauch Chunk Mountain and Pisgah Mountain for a few miles and then entering a series of tunnels that winds under the town of Jim Thorpe before discharging into the Lehigh River.

== See also ==
- List of rivers of Pennsylvania
