= Carbon Plaza Mall =

- Location: Lehighton, Mahoning Township, Carbon County, Pennsylvania, U.S.
- Address: 1241 Blakeslee Blvd E
- Opened: 1972
- Owner: Larken Associates
- Num. of stores: 20+
- Num. of anchor tenants: 3
- Floor area: 210,000 square feet (20,000 m^{2})
- Public transit: CT bus: 701, 702

Carbon Plaza Mall is an indoor and outdoor shopping mall on the south side of Route 443 in Mahoning Township, Carbon County, Pennsylvania, just outside Lehighton. It is anchored by a Giant Supermarket, a Big Lots, and a Marshalls. Other major stores include Dollar Tree, Rent-A-Center, and a Shoe Show Shoe Dept. There are several fast food outlets in the parking lot.

== History ==
Bright's Department Store moved to the mall in 1976, and the store was later sold to Laneco in 1983. The store was remodeled in 1993. Mahoning Valley Cinema opened in December 1995, using part of the space previously occupied by Bright's Department Store. Big Lots opened at the mall in 1997. Carbon Dack Associates purchased the mall in January 1998. Medical services include OAA Orthopaedic Specialists and Blue Mountain Health System, which opened a cardiac care unit at the mall in April 2010. On December 9, 2011, Blue Mountain Health System closed its Health Works fitness center.

In late April 2020, Mahoning Valley Cinema made the decision not to reopen due to the COVID-19 pandemic. FunTime Cinemas, after some renovations, announced they would reopen the former Mahoning Valley Cinema in early 2021. Carbon Plaza Mall was sold to Larken Associates for $18 million in November 2021. Mahoning Valley 8 theaters closed in September 2023 at the request of the landlord and was replaced by Marshalls in 2024.
