= SP Books =

Publishing house

- Founded: 2012
- Founders: Nicolas Tretiakow, Jessica Nelson
- Country of origin: France
- Publication types: Manuscripts
- Nonfiction topics: Literature, Music, Art, Science
- Official website: www.spbooks.com

SP Books, also known as Editions des Saints Peres, is an independent publishing house specialized in the publication of limited facsimile editions of literary manuscripts. Founded in 2012 by Nicolas Tretiakow and Jessica Nelson, Editions des Saints Peres has published the manuscripts of major literary figures including Charles Baudelaire, Jean Cocteau, Jean-Luc Godard, Jules Verne, Lewis Carroll, and Marcel Proust .

Based in Paris, France, SP Books publishes oversize, slipcased books that are printed on deluxe paper and feature facsimiles of the handwritten manuscripts, with revisions and notes. Most print runs are limited and hand-numbered.

“SP” stands for “Saints Peres”, district of Paris where the company was originally founded Editions des Saints Peres' luxury editions are limited and hand-numbered. During a 2015 interview with lecteur.com, Jessica Nelson stated that "in order to bring the facilities of the works back to their original state, each project requires a veritable restoration of the text and the page, it's very touching."

== Manuscripts ==
- 2012 : Hygiene and the Assassin by Amelie Nothomb
- 2013 : Froth on the Daydream by Boris Vian
- 2013 : Beauty and the Beast by Jean Cocteau
- 2013 : Contempt by Jean-Luc Godard
- 2014 : Journey to the End of the Night by Louis Ferdinand Celine
- 2014 : Twenty Thousand Leagues Under the Sea by Jules Verne
- 2015 : Candide by Voltaire
- 2015 : The Flowers of Evil by Charles Baudelaire
- 2015 : In Search of Lost Time by Marcel Proust
- 2015 : Alice's Adventures Under Ground by Lewis Carroll
- 2016 : Madame Bovary by Gustave Flaubert
- 2016 : The Hunchback of Notre-Dame by Victor Hugo
- 2016 : The Mystery of Jean the Bird Catcher by Jean Cocteau
- 2016 : Tales by Charles Perrault
- 2016 : Jane Eyre by Charlotte Bronte
- 2017 : Around the World in 80 Days by Jules Verne
- 2017 : Alcools by Guillaume Apollinaire

is an independent publishing house specialised in the publication of limited facsimile editions of literary manuscripts.

Founded in 2012 by Nicolas Tretiakow and Jessica Nelson, SP Books has published the manuscripts of major literary figures including Francis Scott Fitzgerald, Mary Shelley, Oscar Wilde, Victor Hugo, Virginia Woolf, Marcel Proust, Lewis Carroll, Jules Verne & Charlotte Brontë.
