= Times News (Pennsylvania) =

Newspaper in Lehighton, Pennsylvania

The Times News
- Type: Weekly newspaper
- Format: Tabloid
- Publisher: Pencor Services, Inc.
- Founded: 1883 as Mauch Chunk Daily Times; 1971 as Times News
- Language: English
- Headquarters: Palmerton, Pennsylvania
- City: Lehighton, Pennsylvania
- Country: U.S.
- Sister newspapers: East Penn Free Press; Parkland Press; The Whitehall-Coplay Press; The Northwestern Press; The Northampton Press; The Salisbury Press; The Catasauqua Press; The Bethlehem Press

The Times News is a newspaper published daily except Sundays in Lehighton, Pennsylvania.

Its predecessor publications include the 1883 Mauch Chunk Daily Times of Mauch Chunk, Pennsylvania, and the 1951 Jim Thorpe Times News of Jim Thorpe, Pennsylvania.
