= Normal Square, Pennsylvania =

Village in Pennsylvania, U.S.

Coordinates: 40°47′20″N 75°48′03″W

Normal Square is a village in western Mahoning Township, Carbon County, Pennsylvania, on the edge of Schuylkill County located on Route 443. The Mahoning Creek flows through it eastward to the Lehigh River. The community uses the Lehighton zip code of 18235 and is served by the Mantzville (386) exchange in area code 570.
