= Packerton, Pennsylvania =

Unincorporated community in Pennsylvania, US

- Unincorporated community
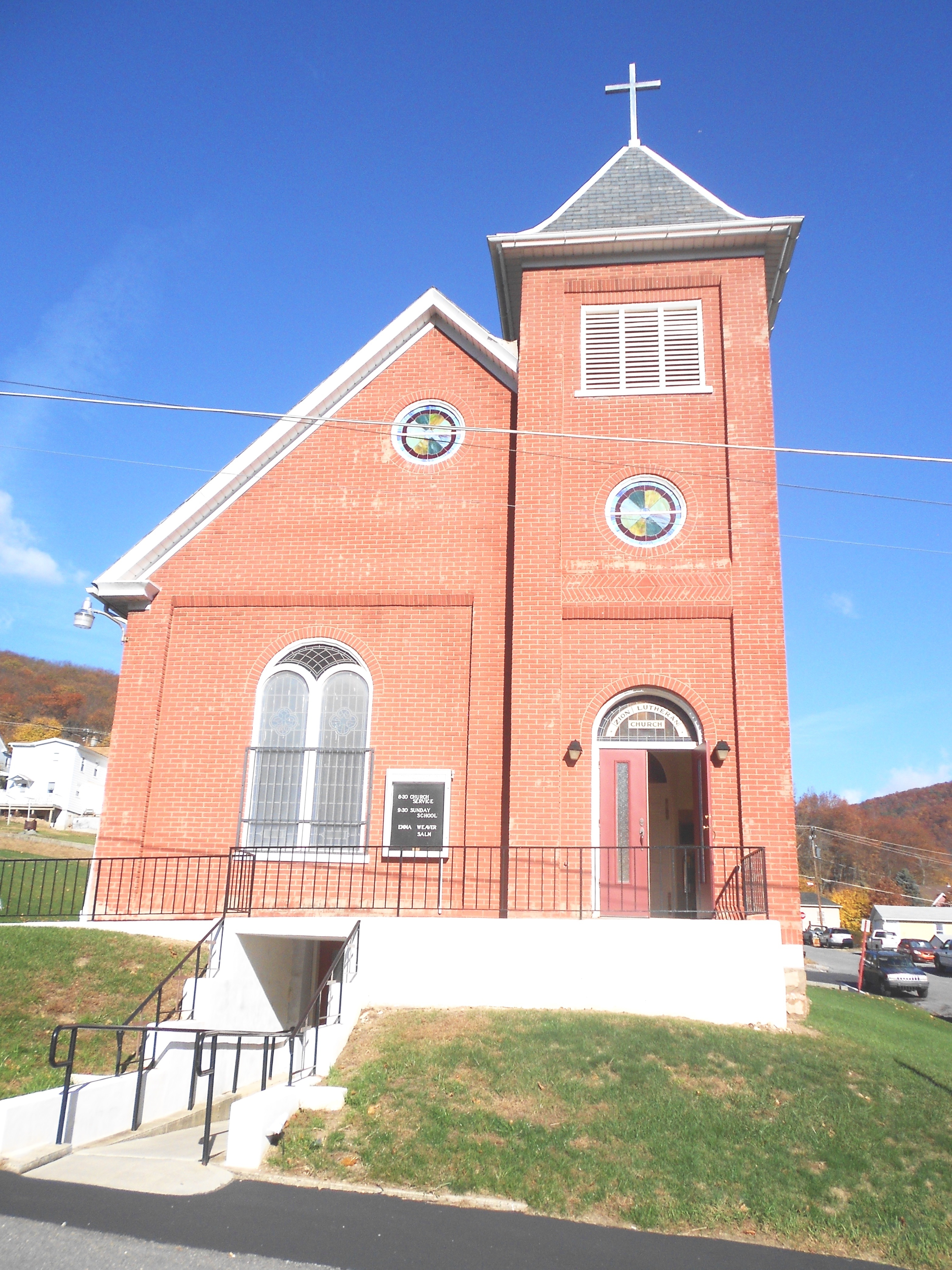
- Zion Lutheran Church

- Location within Pennsylvania Location within the United States
- Coordinates: 40°51′18″N 75°43′09″W
- Country: United States
- State: Pennsylvania
- County: Carbon
- Township: Mahoning
- Elevation: 738 ft (225 m)
- Time zone: UTC-5 (Eastern (EST))
  - Summer (DST): UTC-4 (EDT)
- ZIP code: 18235
- Area codes: 610 and 484
- GNIS feature ID: 1183177

Packerton is a village located in Mahoning Township, Carbon County, Pennsylvania on the Lehigh River and U.S. Route 209 between Jim Thorpe and Lehighton. It uses the Lehighton ZIP code of 18235.
