= Weissport, Pennsylvania =

Borough in Pennsylvania, US

- Borough
- Borough of Weissport
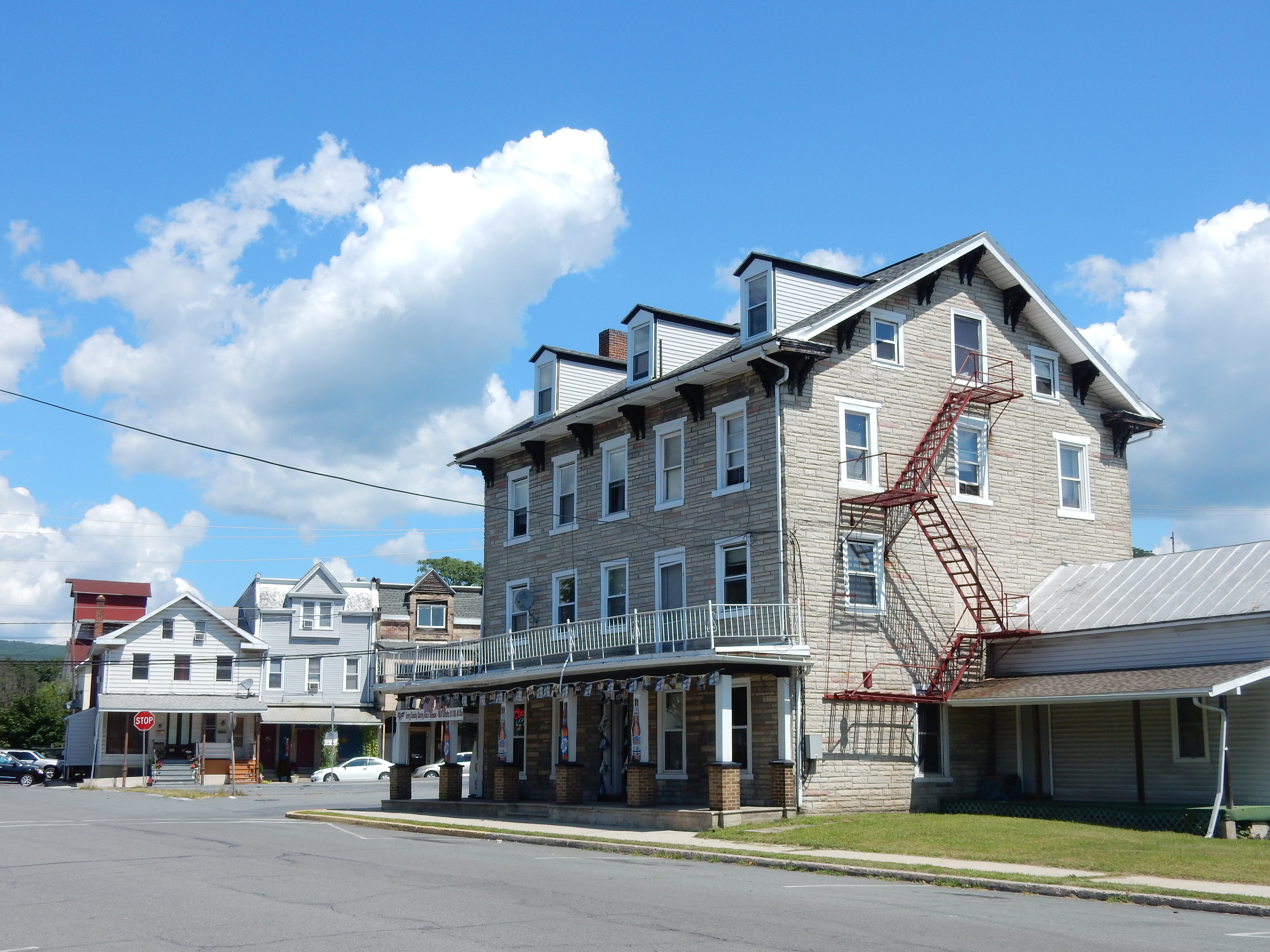
- White Street in Weissport in August 2015

- Location of Weissport in Carbon County, Pennsylvania

- Location of Weissport in Pennsylvania Weissport (the United States)
- Coordinates: 40°49′45″N 75°42′03″W
- Country: United States
- State: Pennsylvania
- County: Carbon
- Established: First tavern

Area
  - Total: 0.16 sq mi (0.41 km^{2})
  - Land: 0.14 sq mi (0.35 km^{2})
  - Water: 0.023 sq mi (0.06 km^{2})
- Elevation: 630 ft (190 m)

Population (2010)
  - Total: 412
  - Estimate (2019): 397
  - Density: 2,938.6/sq mi (1,134.59/km^{2})
- Time zone: UTC-5 (EST)
  - Summer (DST): UTC-4 (EDT)
- ZIP code: 18235
- Area code: 610
- FIPS code: 42-82080
- Website: https://weissportborough.com/front-page/

Weissport is a borough in Carbon County, Pennsylvania. It is part of Northeastern Pennsylvania. As of the 2020 census, Weissport had a population of 413.

== History ==
The town was founded in 1792 by Col. Jacob Weiss. The area was located between Lehighton, Parryville, and Longrun. Soon after, the town itself was established and the first wooden bridge over the river to the town was built in 1805, along with the first post office, taverns, banks, and stores all by 1812.

Within 20 years of its founding, the Weissport established itself as a vital part of the canal industry, specializing in the restoration, building, and repairing of boats along the Lehigh Canal, which ran parallel to the Lehigh River. By 1832, Lewis Weiss began building boats for the Lehigh Coal and Navigation Company and the Morris Canal & Banking Company.

== Geography ==
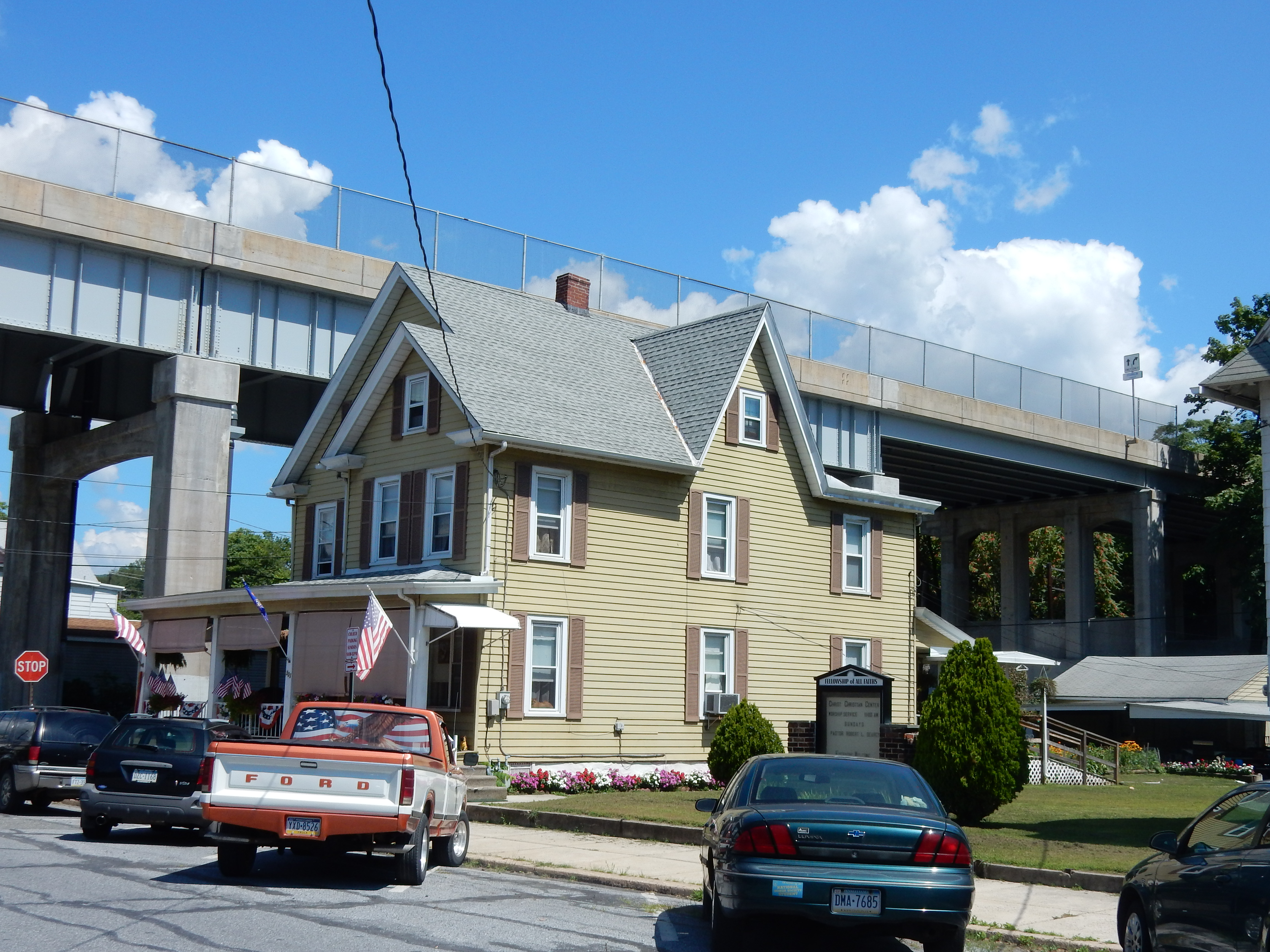
A Weissport residence near the U.S. Route 209 passage

Weissport is located in southern Carbon County at 40°49′45″N 75°42′3″W (40.829105, -75.700817). It is on the east side of the Lehigh River, situated on low ground between the river and the former Lehigh Canal. To the west, across the river, is the much larger borough of Lehighton. Weissport was a central hub during the Lehigh Coal and Navigation Canal era. The town served as the only boat building and repair facility along the Lehigh Canal. Today, the Lehigh Canal Park is a gem of nature and history for residents and visitors alike. The town is one of the cultural and historic resources along the Delaware and Lehigh National Heritage Corridor.

According to the United States Census Bureau, the borough has a total area of 0.16 square miles (0.41 km^{2}), of which 0.14 square miles (0.35 km^{2}) is land and 0.02 square miles (0.06 km^{2}), or 13.92%, is water. Weissport's elevation is 475 feet (145 m) above sea level.

== Transportation ==
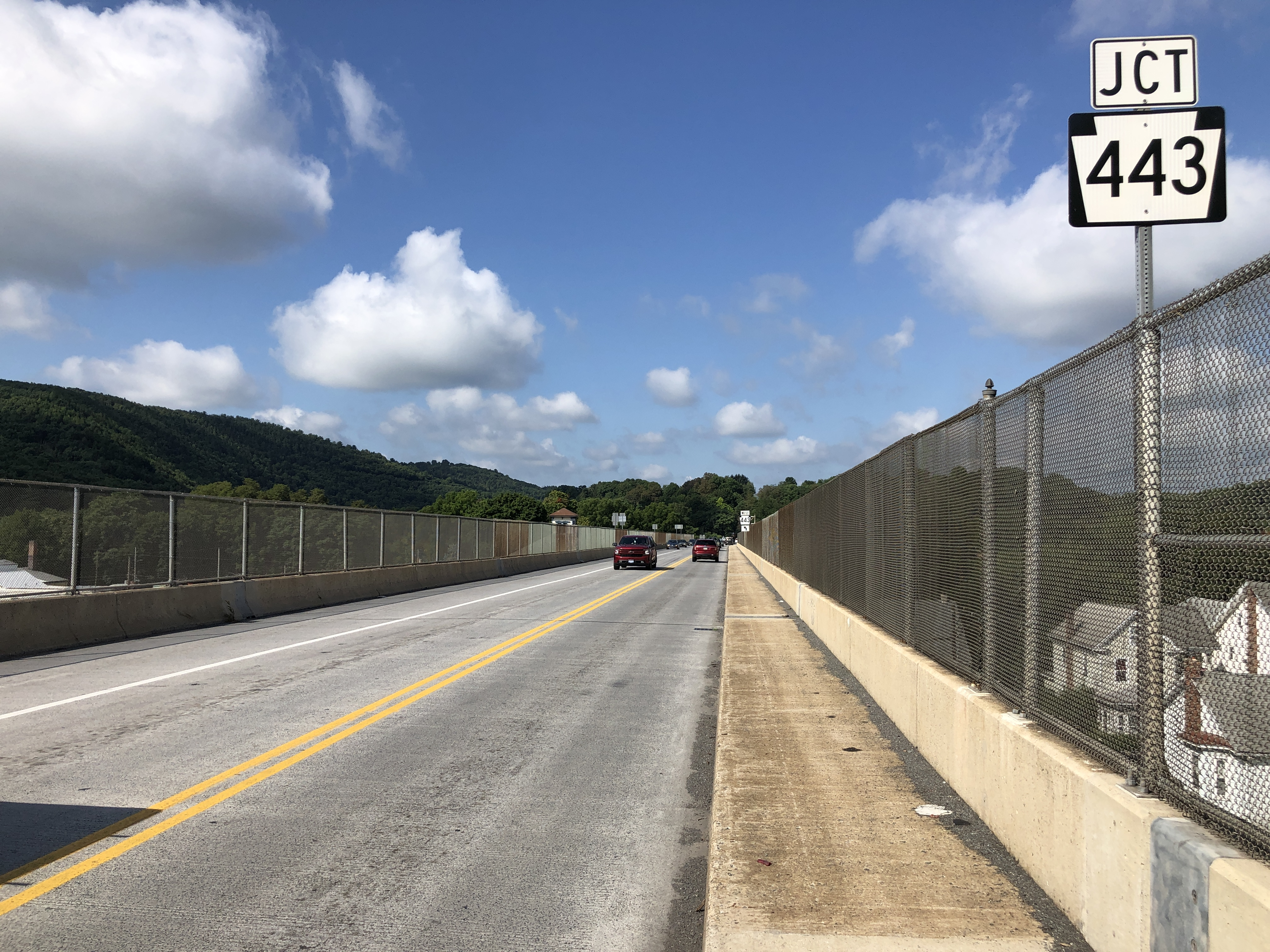
U.S. Route 209 south in Weissport

As of 2007, there were 2.09 miles (3.36 km) of public roads in Weissport, of which 0.56 miles (0.90 km) were maintained by the Pennsylvania Department of Transportation (PennDOT) and 1.53 miles (2.46 km) were maintained by the borough.

U.S. Route 209 passes through Weissport, leading west into Lehighton and east 2 miles (3 km) to Interstate 476, the Northeast Extension of the Pennsylvania Turnpike. I-476 leads north 45 miles (72 km) to Scranton and south 25 miles (40 km) to the Allentown area.

== Demographics ==
Historical population
Census	Pop.	Note	%±
1870	359		—
1880	388		8.1%
1890	456		17.5%
1900	601		31.8%
1910	638		6.2%
1920	683		7.1%
1930	661		−3.2%
1940	657		−0.6%
1950	674		2.6%
1960	625		−7.3%
1970	561		−10.2%
1980	486		−13.4%
1990	472		−2.9%
2000	434		−8.1%
2010	412		−5.1%
2020	413		0.2%

As of the census of 2000, there were 434 people, 176 households, and 107 families residing in the borough. The population density was 3,264.5 inhabitants per square mile (1,260.4/km^{2}). There were 196 housing units at an average density of 1,474.3 per square mile (569.2/km^{2}). The racial makeup of the borough was 95.16% White, 0.46% African American, 3.46% Asian, 0.23% from other races, and 0.69% from two or more races. Hispanic or Latino of any race were 0.69% of the population.

There were 176 households, out of which 29.0% had children under the age of 18 living with them, 42.0% were married couples living together, 13.6% had a female householder with no husband present, and 39.2% were non-families. 31.3% of all households were made up of individuals, and 9.1% had someone living alone who was 65 years of age or older. The average household size was 2.47 and the average family size was 3.12.

In the borough, the population was spread out, with 23.5% under the age of 18, 9.4% from 18 to 24, 35.0% from 25 to 44, 20.7% from 45 to 64, and 11.3% who were 65 years of age or older. The median age was 34 years. For every 100 females, there were 104.7 males. For every 100 females age 18 and over, there were 106.2 males.

The median income for a household in the borough was $30,139, and the median income for a family was $37,188. Males had a median income of $27,639 versus $17,083 for females. The per capita income for the borough was $13,785. About 11.0% of families and 14.2% of the population were below the poverty line, including 22.5% of those under age 18 and 4.4% of those age 65 or over.

== Gallery ==
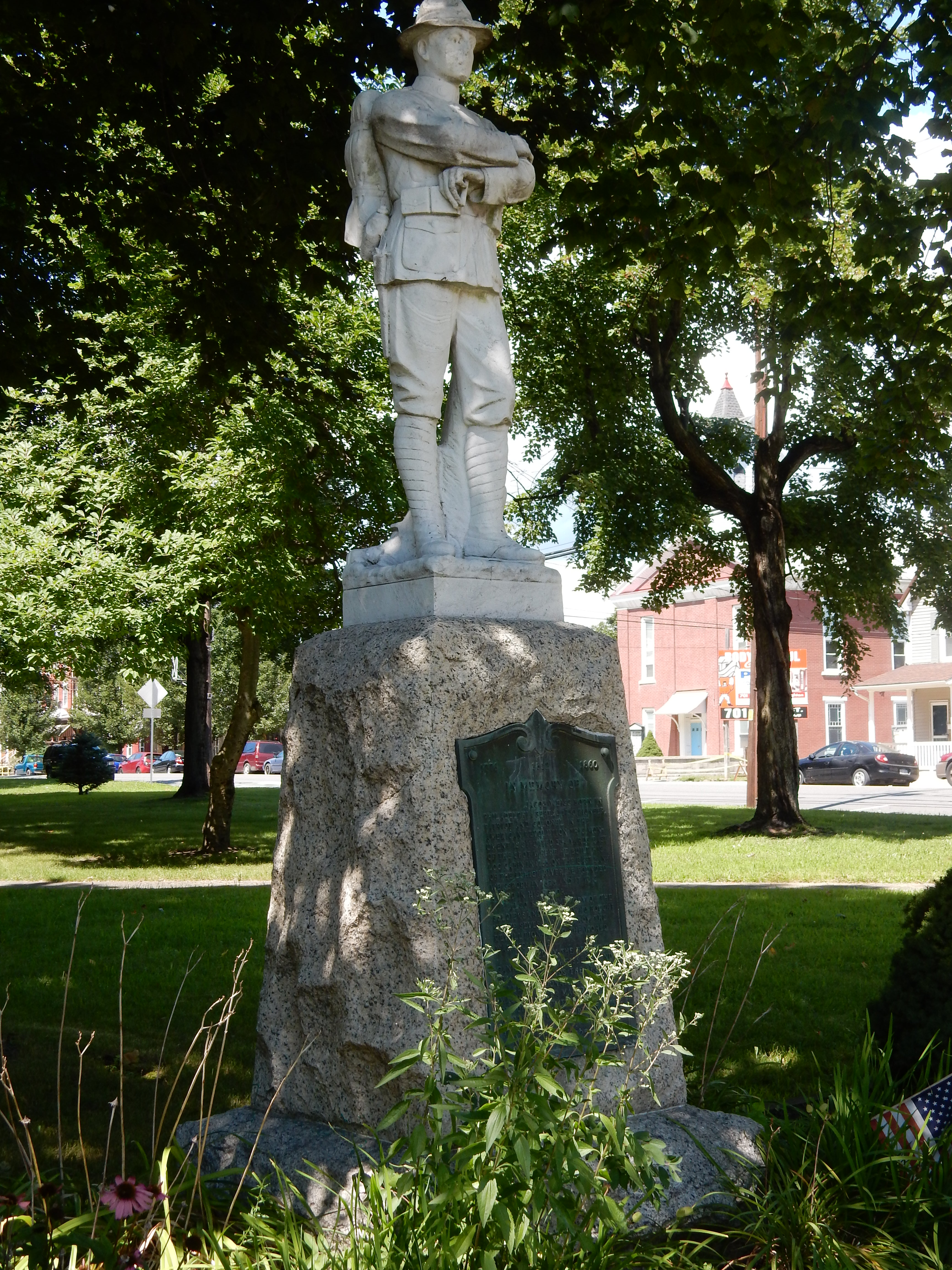
War Memorial

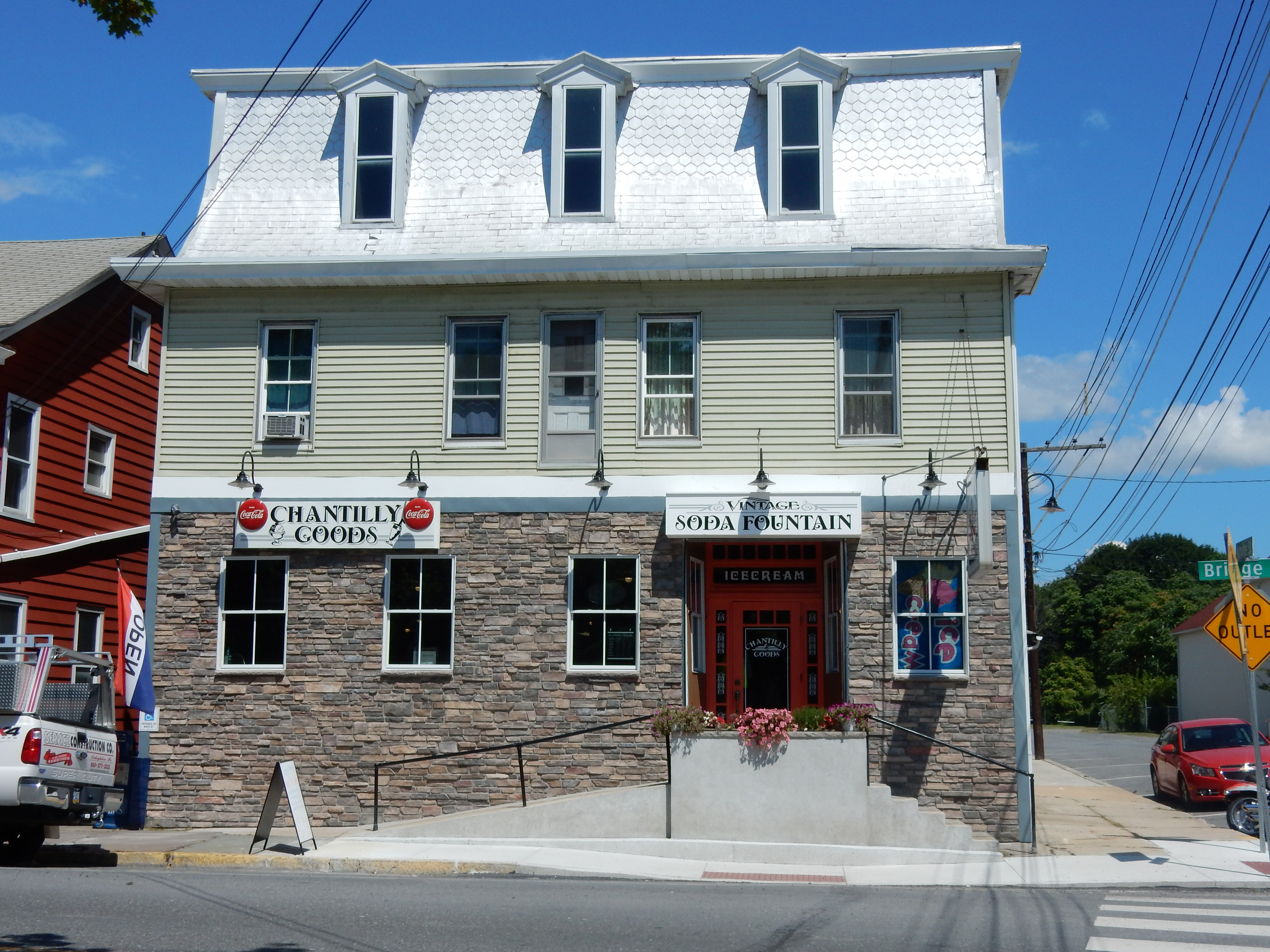
Chantilly Goods at Bridge St.

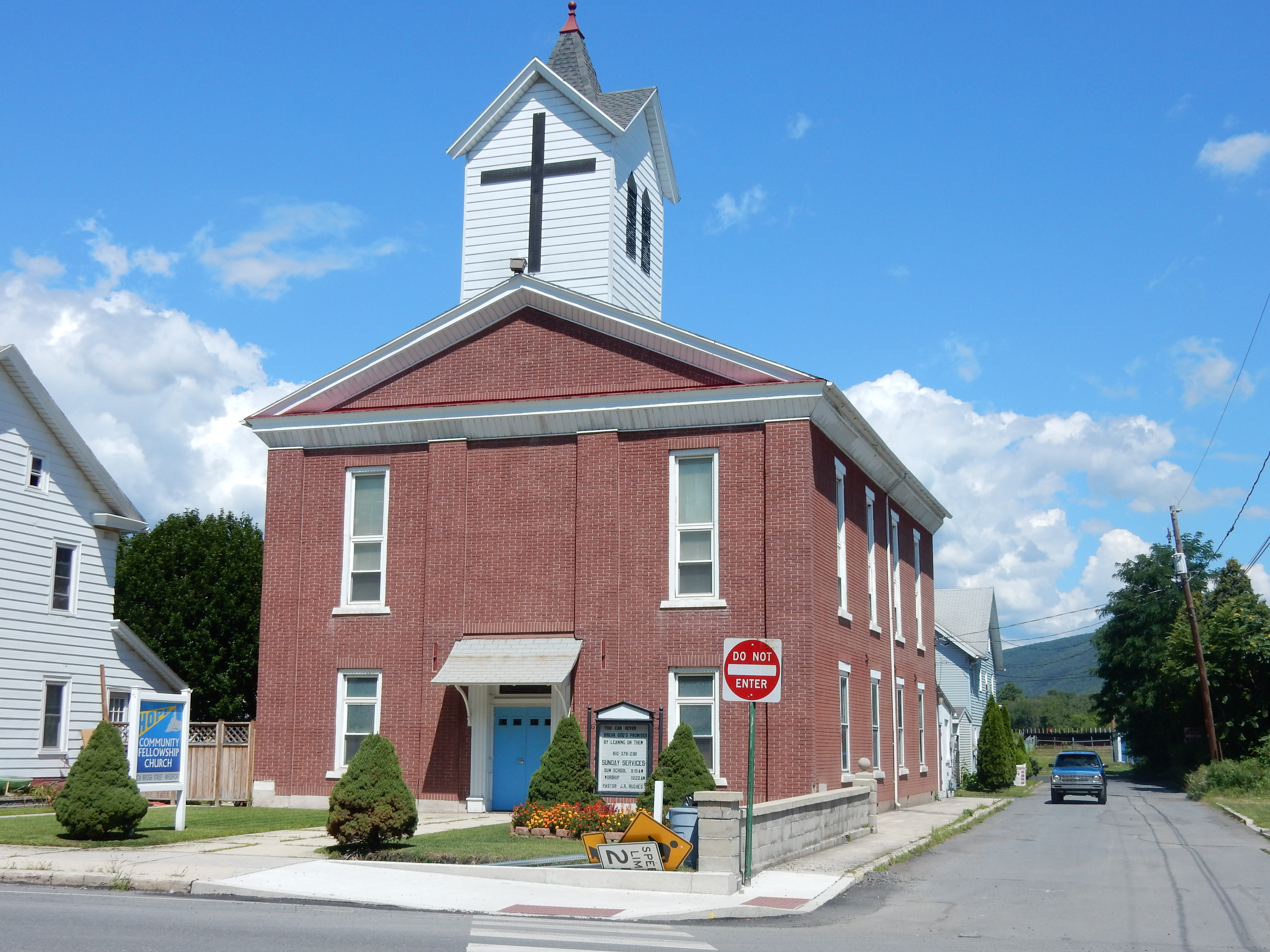
Community Fellowship Church

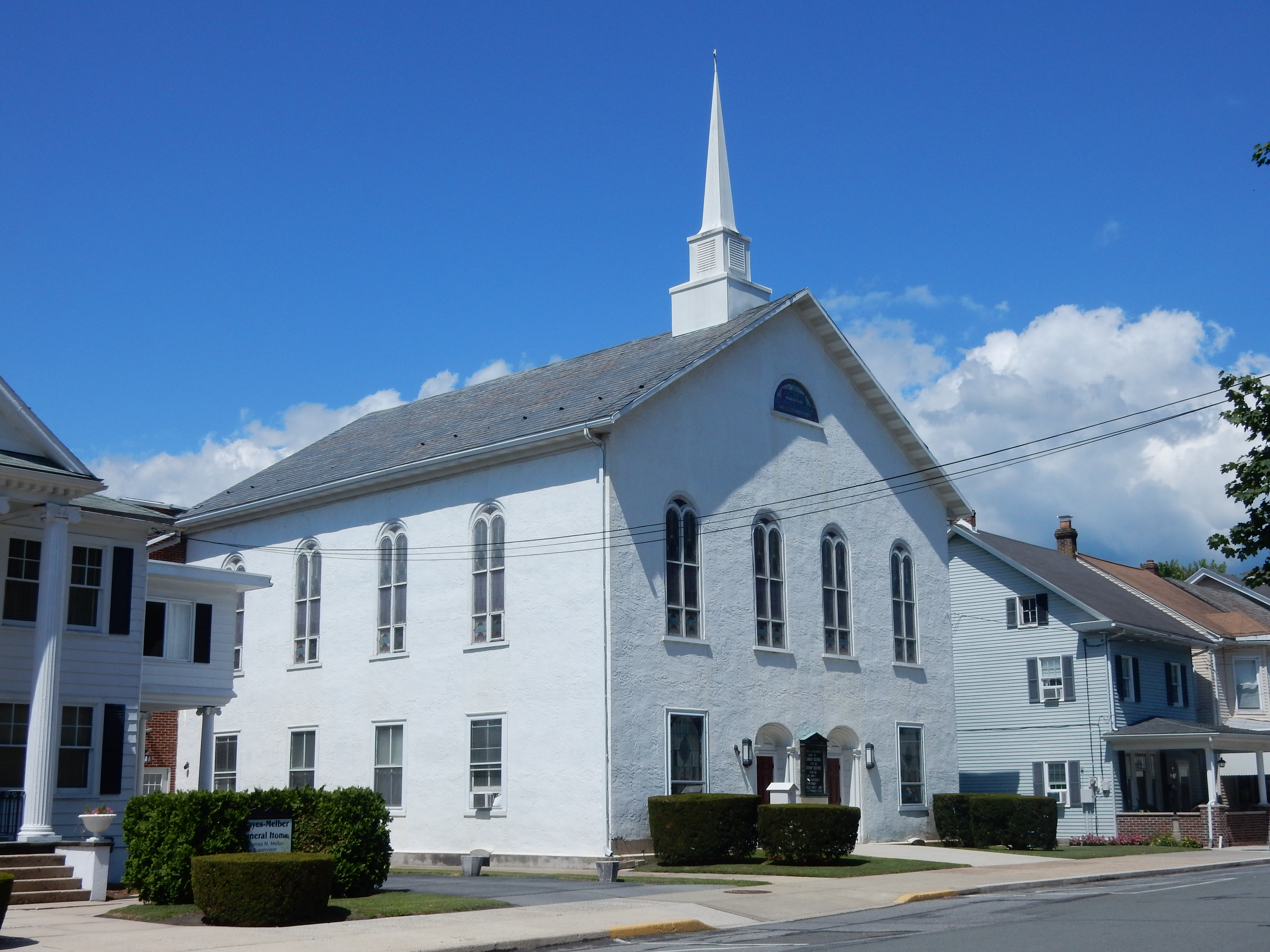
Jacob's United Church of Christ
