= Charles Cist (editor) =

American editor (1792–1868)

- Born: April 24, 1792; Philadelphia
- Died: September 5, 1868 (aged 76); Cincinnati
- Occupation: Journalist

Charles Cist (April 24, 1792 – September 5, 1868) was an American editor.

== Biography ==
He was the son of printer Charles Cist. He was educated in Philadelphia, and during the War of 1812 was engaged in garrison duty in the eastern forts. After the war, he settled in Pittsburgh, Pennsylvania, and a few years later moved to Harmony, Pennsylvania, where he opened a store, and was for a time postmaster.

During the winter of 1827/8 he moved to Cincinnati, where he opened and superintended the first Sunday school in Cincinnati, and continued it until it grew beyond his control, when it was divided among the churches. Cist also worked for the success of free schools.

In 1843 Cist established The Western Weekly Advertiser, a family journal devoted to the early history of the First Nations of the west, and to statistics relating to Cincinnati and the state of Ohio. A few years later the name became Cist's Weekly Advertiser, and it continued until 1853. He prepared and published Cincinnati in 1841 (drawing largely on an 1815 work by Daniel Drake), Sketches and Statistics of Cincinnati in 1851, Sketches and Statistics of Cincinnati in 1859, and The Cincinnati Miscellany, the last composed largely of incidents in the early settlements, with many of his own writings (2 vols., 1845 and 1846).

== Family ==
He married Janet White in 1817. They had 13 children. Their son Henry M. Cist was noted for his history of the Army of the Cumberland. Another son, Lewis Jacob Cist (born in Harmony, Pennsylvania, November 20, 1818; died in Cincinnati, Ohio, March 30, 1885), worked in banking, and was noted for his verses and his large collection of autographs and old portraits. His collection was sold in New York City in 1886 and 1887.
