= Mahoning Creek (Lehigh River tributary) =

River in Pennsylvania, United States

Coordinates: 40°49′31″N 75°42′01″W

Mahoning Creek is a 16.7-mile-long (26.9 km) tributary of the Lehigh River in Schuylkill and Carbon counties, Pennsylvania, in the United States.

Mahoning Creek rises due south of the borough of Summit Hill, on the opposite side of the divide in a saddle connecting its two flanking ridgelines. It runs parallel to and along the south slopes of Pisgah Mountain, diverges from the Mahoning Hills to run along the north-side slopes of Mauch Chunk Mountain, passes through Mahoning Township, then joins the Lehigh River near the borough of Lehighton.

== Etymology ==
The name "Mahoning" is from the Lenape language and is most likely derived from "menehoking"—often written "menehokink"—meaning "a place to get water". Many places named Mahoning, or with monikers similar to Mahoning, exist between the United States' east coast and Ohio. It's possible that early colonialist settlers, when naming settlements, confused the word "Mahoning" with the word "mehemening" meaning "a beverage of any kind" or alternatively conflated it with the Irish surname Mahoney.

== See also ==
- List of rivers of Pennsylvania
