= Exhumed Films =

American film organization

- Company type: Film Organization
- Founded: 1997
- Headquarters: Philadelphia, Pennsylvania, U.S.
- Key people: Dan Fraga; Joseph A. Gervasi; Harry Guerro; Jesse Nelson
- Website: Exhumedfilms.com

Exhumed Films is an American "organization devoted to showing horror movies for the benefit of their fans."

== History ==
Based in Philadelphia, Exhumed Films was founded in 1997 by Dan Fraga, Joseph A. Gervasi, Harry Guerro and Jesse Nelson to exhibit obscure horror and exploitation films. Their first screening took place on October 24, 1997, at the Harwan Theatre in South Jersey and consisted of a double feature of films by Italian director Lucio fulci: Zombie and The Gates of Hell.

With the earnings from the first show, the group planned another event the following February and officially took on the name "Exhumed Films." Since its founding, Exhumed Films has hosted "over 70 film screenings in seven different theatres across New Jersey and Philadelphia" as well as working with Philadelphia Festival of World Cinema and the Philadelphia Gay and Lesbian Film Festival.

Exhumed Films screens film prints instead of digital video for aesthetic reasons.

== Screening locations ==
Exhumed Films originally presented screenings at the Harwan Theatre in Southern New Jersey, with a one-off 3-D presentation of Friday the 13th 3-D at the now-defunct GCC North East Theater in Philadelphia. When the Harwan closed, exhumed moved on to present screenings at a nearby Hoyts Theatre until that location also closed. Following the closure of Hoyts, Exhumed screenings took place at Cinemark Theater in Somerdale, New Jersey. In 2002, Exhumed began screenings at the Broadway Theatre in Pitman, New Jersey. Exhumed screenings took place at the Broadway from 2002 until 2005. Since 2005, Exhumed Film's primary venue has been the International House Philadelphia.

== 24-Hour Horror thon ==
Exhumed Film's annual 24-Hour Horror thon is a 24-hour program of horror features, shorts, and trailers. The Horror-thon has previously been held the weekend before or after Halloween, although the 2010 program took place October 30–31. The 2008 Horror thon took place over the weekend switchover for Daylight Saving time, making that year's program 25 hours instead of 24.

The first Horror thon took place in 2007 to celebrate the tenth anniversary of Exhumed Films. Each Horror thon has taken place at the International House Philadelphia.

The lineup for each year's Horror thon is kept secret.” Attendees are given a booklet with clues as to what films will be shown. For the 2011 show, the film The Dead (2010) was shown in its Philadelphia premiere, marking the first time any of the films in the show lineup had been announced in advance.
