= Mahoning Township, Carbon County, Pennsylvania =

Township in Pennsylvania, US

Mahoning Township
- Township
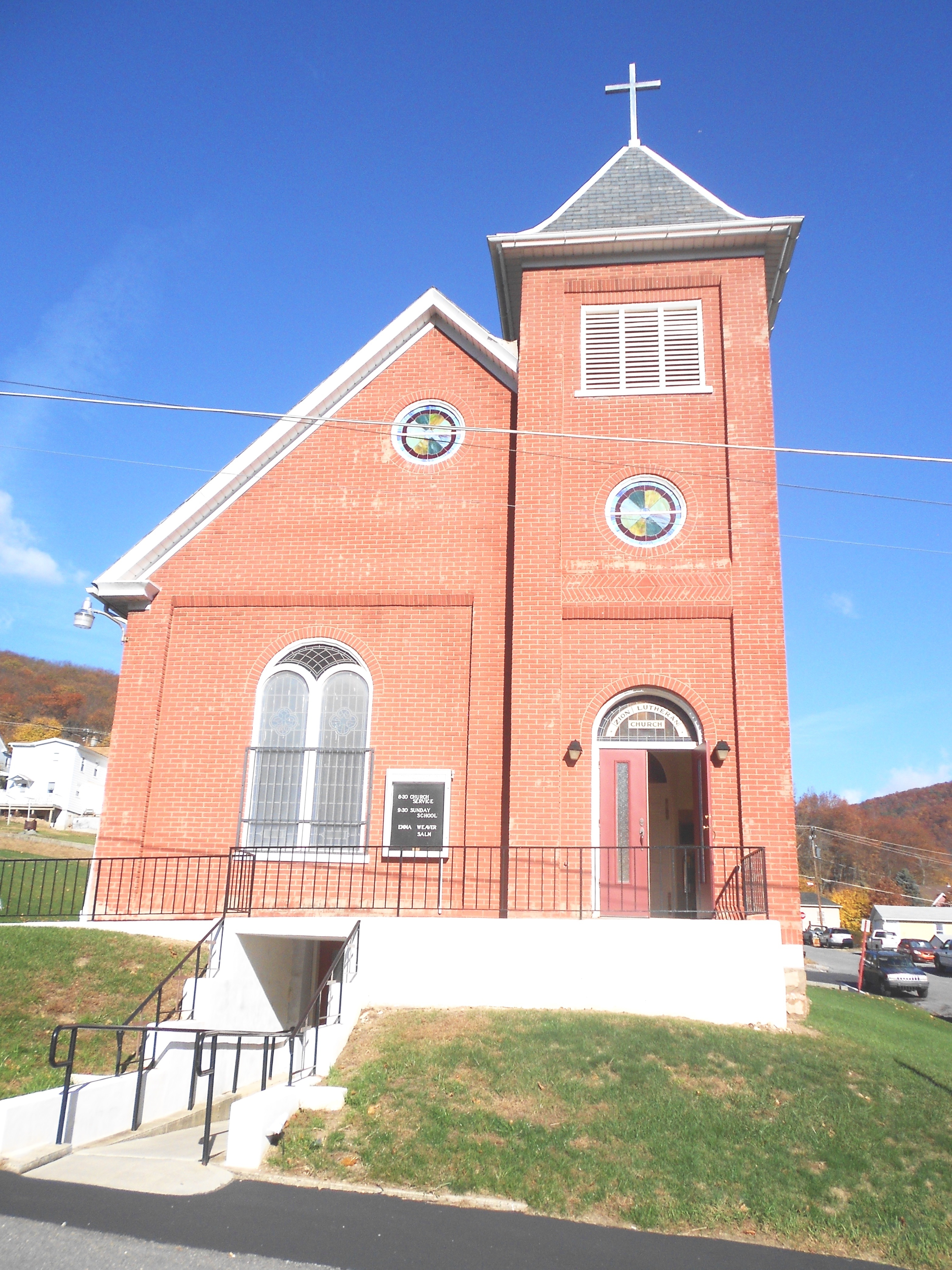
- Zion Lutheran Church in Packerton

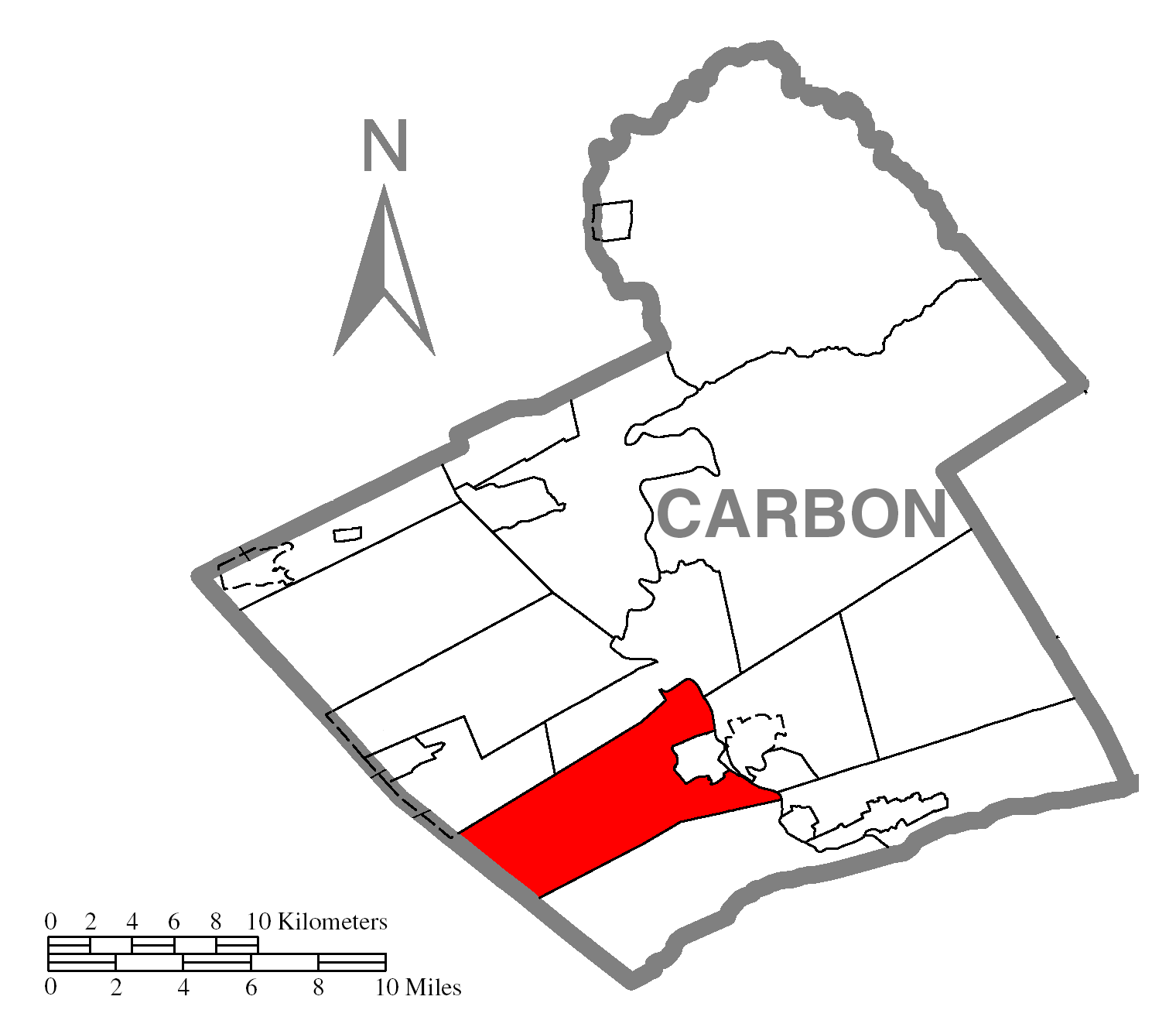
- Location of Mahoning Township in Carbon County

- Location of Carbon County in Pennsylvania
- Coordinates: 40°50′00″N 75°44′58″W
- Country: United States
- State: Pennsylvania
- County: Carbon

Area
  - Total: 23.78 sq mi (61.58 km^{2})
  - Land: 23.66 sq mi (61.29 km^{2})
  - Water: 0.12 sq mi (0.30 km^{2})
- Elevation: 1,000 ft (300 m)

Population (2010)
  - Total: 4,305
  - Estimate (2016): 4,204
  - Density: 178/sq mi (68.6/km^{2})
- Time zone: UTC-5 (EST)
  - Summer (DST): UTC-4 (EDT)
- ZIP code: 18235
- Area codes: 570 and 610
- FIPS code: 42-025-46640
- Website: www.mahoningtownshiponline.com

Mahoning Township is a township in Carbon County, Pennsylvania. It is part of Northeastern Pennsylvania. The population was 4,305 at the 2010 census, up from 3,978 at the 2000 census.

== Geography ==
The township is in southwestern Carbon County in the valley of Mahoning Creek, a tributary of the Lehigh River. The township is bordered by the borough of Lehighton to the northeast and by Schuylkill County to the southwest. It is situated near the northeastern end of the Mahoning Hills, the mountainous foothills region to the west of the Lehigh River.

According to the U.S. Census Bureau, the township has a total area of 23.8 square miles (61.6 km^{2}), of which 23.7 square miles (61.3 km^{2}) is land and 0.1 square miles (0.3 km^{2}), or 0.48%, is water. It is drained by Mahoning Creek, a tributary of the Lehigh River, which forms parts of the township's eastern boundary. The natural northern boundary with Jim Thorpe and Summit Hill is on the south slope of Mauch Chunk Mountain. Its villages include Dry Tavern, Jamestown, Mahoning Valley (also in West Penn Township, Schuylkill County), New Mahoning, Normal Square, and Packerton.

The township has varied elevations from 450 to 650 feet (140 to 200 m) in the valleys along PA Routes 443 and 902 and rising to 950 to 1,150 feet (290 to 350 m) on the top of Mahoning Mountain in the south and 850 to 1,050 feet (260 to 320 m) on Oriole Hill. The terrain causes the local weather to vary in the winter time from that of the surrounding region. Mahoning Mountain Road is a mile-long hill-climb to a road junction called "Dry Tavern" along a summit of the Mahoning Hills that has many sharp curves and is known throughout the greater Lehighton area as a notorious road in winter time. At the bottom of the mountain it has an elevation of 445 feet (136 m), and at the top it has an elevation of 970 feet (300 m), so it is quite possible for it to be raining at the bottom while having a few inches of snow at the top.

== Climate ==
Mahoning Township has a humid continental climate (Dfa/Dfb) and the hardiness zone is mainly 6a with 6b found along the river south of Lehighton and in the eastern half of the township near the Mahoning Creek. Average monthly temperatures at Jake Arner Memorial Airport range from 27.8 °F in January to 72.5 °F in July.

== Demographics ==
Historical population
Census	Pop.	Note	%±
2000	3,978		—
2010	4,305		8.2%
2016 (est.)	4,204		−2.3%
U.S. Decennial Census

As of the census of 2000, there were 3,978 people, 1,543 households, and 1,131 families residing in the township. The population density was 168.5 inhabitants per square mile (65.1/km^{2}). There were 1,693 housing units at an average density of 71.7 per square mile (27.7/km^{2}). The racial makeup of the township was 98.27% White, 0.23% African American, 0.40% Native American, 0.45% Asian, 0.08% from other races, and 0.58% from two or more races. Hispanic or Latino of any race were 0.40% of the population.

There were 1,543 households, out of which 27.7% had children under the age of 18 living with them, 59.8% were married couples living together, 8.2% had a female householder with no husband present, and 26.7% were non-families. 22.2% of all households were made up of individuals, and 12.1% had someone living alone who was 65 years of age or older. The average household size was 2.47 and the average family size was 2.87.

In the township the population was spread out, with 19.8% under the age of 18, 6.4% from 18 to 24, 26.3% from 25 to 44, 26.9% from 45 to 64, and 20.5% who were 65 years of age or older. The median age was 43 years. For every 100 females, there were 96.5 males. For every 100 females age 18 and over, there were 94.9 males.

The median income for a household in the township was $35,212, and the median income for a family was $43,897. Males had a median income of $29,016 versus $20,943 for females. The per capita income for the township was $17,330. About 8.6% of families and 10.5% of the population were below the poverty line, including 15.3% of those under age 18 and 3.0% of those age 65 or over.

== Government ==
Supervisors:

- Deborah McGowan
- Myron Blahy, Vice-chair
- Brian Reeser
- Ronald Reeser
- Robert Slaw, Chairman

== Commercial activity ==
Mahoning Township contains the retail hub of Carbon County. Along a one-mile stretch of Route 443 southwest of Lehighton are located the Carbon Plaza Mall, Walmart, Lowe's, and Aldi. The township also hosts Mahoning Speedway and the private-aviation Jake Arner Memorial Airport.

== Transportation ==
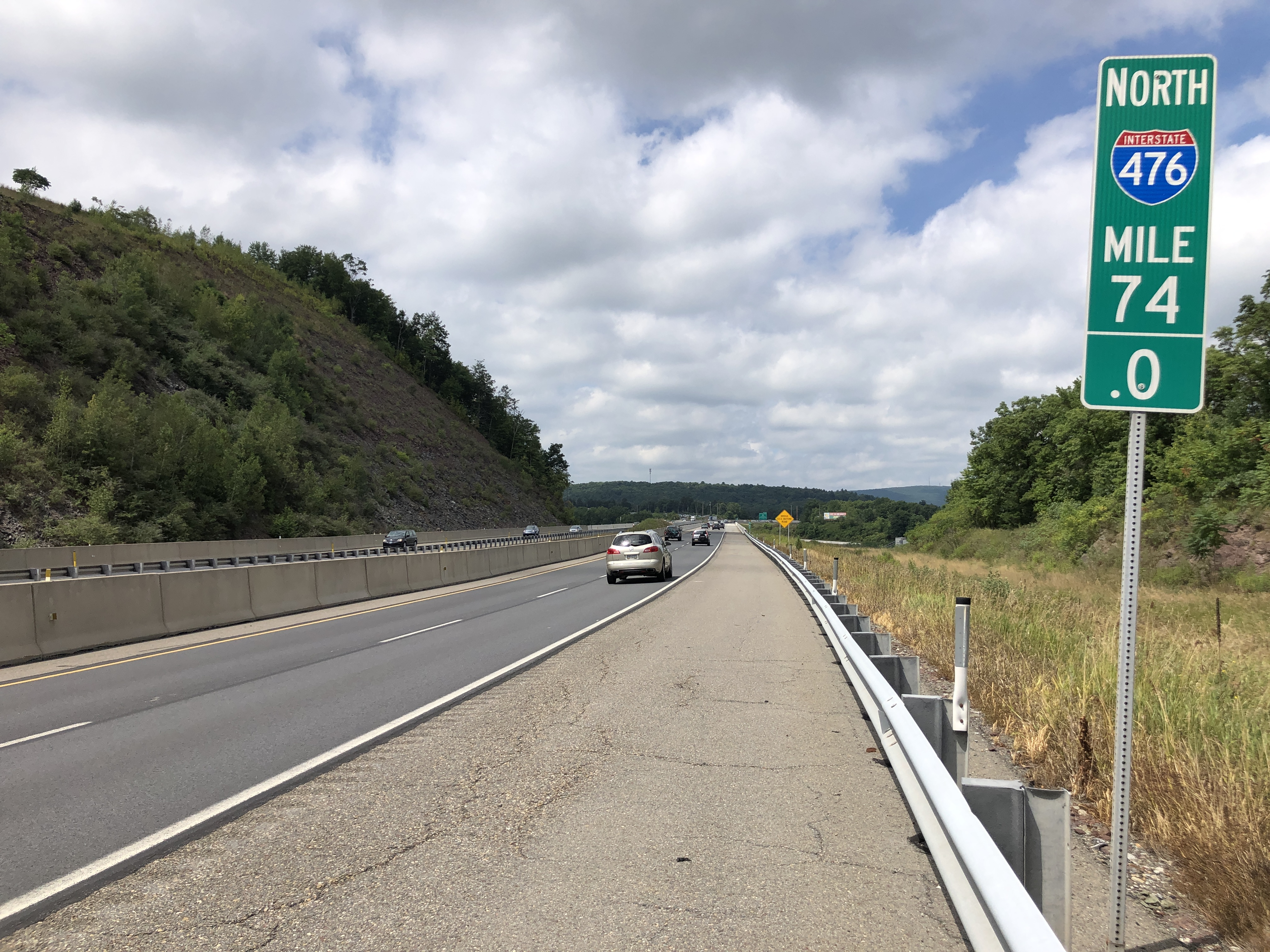
I-476/Pennsylvania Turnpike Northeast Extension northbound in Mahoning Township

As of 2020, there were 72.59 miles (116.82 km) of public roads in Mahoning Township, of which 0.30 miles (0.48 km) were maintained by the Pennsylvania Turnpike Commission (PTC), 28.60 miles (46.03 km) were maintained by the Pennsylvania Department of Transportation (PennDOT) and 43.69 miles (70.31 km) were maintained by the township.

Interstate 476, the Pennsylvania Turnpike's Northeast Extension, passes through the eastern corner of Mahoning Township, but the nearest interchange is in neighboring Franklin Township. Highways providing local access include Pennsylvania Route 443, which crosses from U.S. Route 209 on Lehighton's south side west to Pennsylvania Route 309 in South Tamaqua, Schuylkill County, and Pennsylvania Route 902, which comes southeast over Mauch Chunk Ridge from US 209 in Lansford and Summit Hill to New Mahoning, then turns east to PA 443 in Lehighton with access to US 209 in downtown via Mahoning Street. US 209 proceeds north through the township between Lehighton and Jim Thorpe, although this segment is signed southbound.

Jake Arner Memorial Airport is located within the township along PA Route 902.
