= Charles Cist (printer) =

American journalist

- Born: 15 August 1738; Saint Petersburg
- Died: 2 December 1805 (aged 67); Philadelphia
- Alma mater: Martin Luther University Halle-Wittenberg

Charles Cist (15 August 1738, in St. Petersburg, Russia – 2 December 1805, in Philadelphia) was an American printer.

== Biography ==
His birth surname was Thiel. He graduated from Martin Luther University of Halle-Wittenberg with a medical degree. He decided to emigrate to the Thirteen Colonies in 1769, at which time he adopted the surname Cist, the initials of his birth name. He settled in Philadelphia in 1773 and learned printing. With Melchior Steiner, he established a printing and publishing business. During the American Revolution, they published many documents relating to current events, including Paine's The American Crisis. In 1781 the firm was dissolved, and Cist continued in business alone.

Cist began the publication of The American Herald in 1784, and of the Columbian Magazine in 1786. Cist aided the colonial government during the revolution by endorsing large amounts of continental currency, which he was later compelled to redeem.

He was the first person to introduce anthracite coal into general use in the United States. In 1792 he was a member of the Lehigh Coal Company, and brought several wagons full of this coal to Philadelphia, where he offered to give it away. But he could not dispose of it, and was threatened with mob violence for trying to impose on the people with a lot of black stones for coal.

In 1793 he was secretary of the Fame Fire Association, and announced that the society had procured a fire-escape apparatus to save persons from burning houses by means of a bucket drawn up to the top of the building. During the administration of John Adams, he became public printer, and established an extensive printing office and book bindery in Washington, D.C., at great expense, for the purpose of publishing public documents.

== Family ==
In 1781, he married Mary Weiss, sister of Jacob Weiss. Their son, also named Charles Cist, became a noted editor. Their other son Jacob Cist settled in Luzerne County, Pennsylvania and became key figure in the early development of Pennsylvania's anthracite industry.
