= Mauch Chunk Mountain =

Mountain ridge in Pennsylvania, United States

Coordinates: 41.80984°N 76.71591°W

Mauch Chunk Ridge or Mauch Chunk Mountain

Highest point
- Elevation: 1,501 ft (458 m)displayed map

Geography
- Location: Carbon County, Pennsylvania, U.S.
- Parent range: Appalachian Mountains, Poconos
- Topo map(s): USGS 40075G8, 1947&'83 Tamaqua, Pennsylvania, U.S.

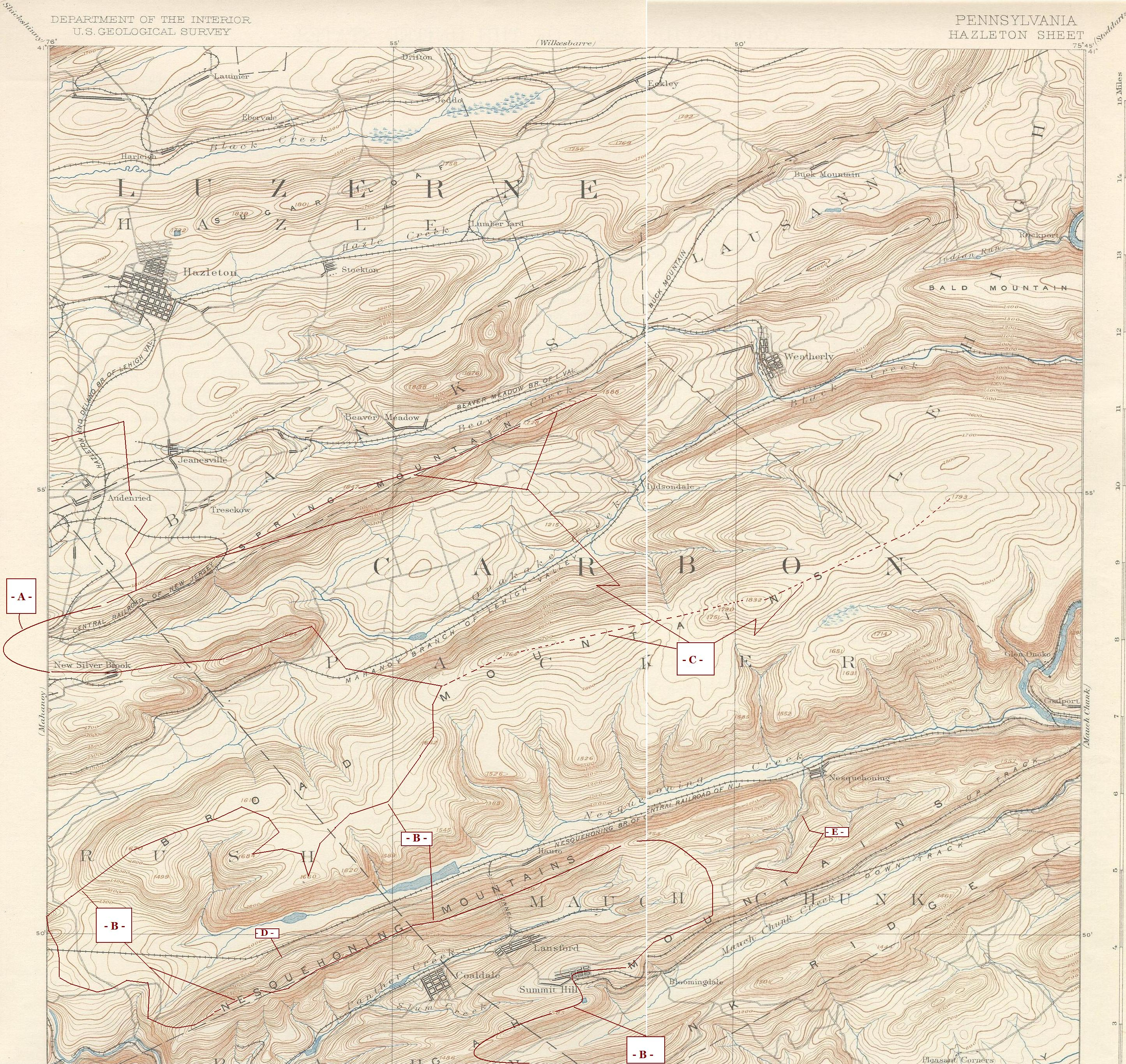
Mauch Chunk Ridge can be seen in part as the ridgeline in the lower right hand quadrant of this contour map

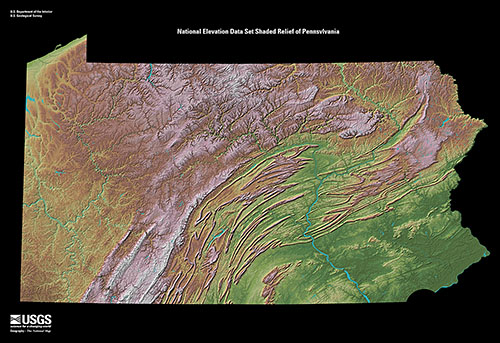
Detail of eastern Pennsylvania

Mauch Chunk Ridge (on older USGS Maps) or Mauch Chunk Mountain is a historically important barrier ridgeline north of the Blue Mountain escarpment and 3rd parallel ridgeline south of the Nesquehoning Creek after Nesquehoning Mountain and Pisgah Ridge in the Ridge-and-Valley Appalachians of Northeastern Pennsylvania.

The three lengthy ridges and two valley formations together are literally the first ridges and valleys just south of the Poconos on the opposite side of the Lehigh River—geological formations which contain some of the richest Anthracite coal bearing sedimentary rocks of Northeastern Pennsylvania. Historically, the first Anthracite mines in America were located atop Pisgah Mountain at Summit Hill and caravanned by pack mule through the Mauch Chunk Creek valley. Then the historic Mauch Chunk and Summit Hill Switchback Railroad, the second railway in North America was built along the Pisgah Mountain side of the same valley—and become quite a tourist attraction and is known as the world's first roller coaster, and would inspire others in purpose built amusement parks. The Mauch Chunk and Summit Hill Switchback Railroad became only a tourist road in the 1890s and thrilled riders until it was liquidated in the 1930s, a casualty of the Great Depression.

The north slopes of the long series of worn peaks feed the minor tributary Mauch Chunk Creek's mouth which opens out easterly into the Lehigh River, and where from ca. 1792 on through its valley, pack mule trails—then North America's second ever rail road— enabled the output of the first coal mines of the southern Anthracite region at Summit Hill, Pennsylvania to be conveyed to the water transport available on the Lehigh River at what is now Packerton, Pennsylvania. A number of early pack mule routes traveled in part along the north faces of the mountain's long ridgeline (12.5 miles (20.1 km)) from Summit Hill and points west.

The ridge is a succession of peaks exceeding 1,501 feet (457.5 m) looming 300–540 feet above the rural bedroom communities now along in the Mauch Chunk Creek valley. The ridge forms the right bank drainage divide on the south and the streams source in the west. The west end of the ridge is named TBDL Geologically, the Mauch Chunk Ridge divide is classed as of minor degree, the watersheds north and south of the ridge enter the same body, the Lehigh, and do so only a few miles apart

== Geology ==
The Mountain is but one average folded mountain in a succession of near parallel ridgelines, where each are made by a succession of peaks of nearly the same height. This Ridge and Valley province is a geological feature that extends from New Jersey into Virginia forming a great barrier of successive valleys. Pisgah Mountain-just across the valley and creek, is located along the southern fringe of northeastern Pennsylvania's Poconos region but is also central to the Southern Anthracite Region of Pennsylvania— known as the site of the Richest Anthracite Seam, in the heart of the Southern Pennsylvania Anthracite Field and the geological province known as the Anthracite Upland section. The ridgeline parallels the escarpment of the Blue Mountain region.

The mountain ridge's peaks lie between two nearly parallel ridge lines to the north and south, Nesquehoning Mountain a similar ridge extending north from Mount Pisgah where the two are joined, and to the south across a valley formed by Mauch Chunk Creek, the Mauch Chunk Ridge. The former historic Mauch Chunk & Summit Hill Railway is now a combined bike & hiking trail along both its former paths, and the north trail has an offshoot to the summit of Mount Pisgah that has a view of the surrounding countryside, and particularly of the Lehigh River gap about 1,200 feet (366 m) feet (or more) below. Mauch Chunk Lake Park and Mauch Chunk Reservoir are also located at the base of the mountain in the valley it forms with Mauch Chunk Mountain, a similar ridgeline in the ridge-and-valley Appalachians north of PA-Rt 443.

At the Mauch Chunk-Bear Mountain Gap east of Jim Thorpe, the range ends rapidly descending to the Lehigh River Valley below the northeastern summit marked on USGS topological maps as Mt. Pisgah, which is named for the biblical mountain in Jordan from which Moses first saw the promised land (as are many mountains around the world and especially in the United States). During the late 19th century and early 20th-century, this mountain was a favorite summer resort for those from eastern cities, even as far away as New York City for it sported what has been called the world's first roller coaster, the gravity railroad founded in 1827 by the Lehigh Coal & Navigation Company, builders of the Lehigh Canal and the tourist attracting Mauch Chunk & Summit Hill Railway, which formed a loop between South Mauch Chunk (now the south part of Jim Thorpe, PA) and Summit Hill, Pennsylvania, the site of the first high volume coal production in the greater region. Visitors were able to travel by rail via the Central Railroad of New Jersey (CNJ) which succeeded the Lehigh and Susquehanna founded by LC&N Co. which owned most of the eastern part of the area, stay on in a hotel owned by the LC&N, eat at restaurants and buy from shops owned in part by the LC&N, and see the sights after the long mule-pulled four hour trip up to Summit Hill, which featured other tourist services and a 100 foot observation tower. The views from the tower looked over the bucolic Pennsylvania landscape between the Nesquehoning Ridge and Pisgah Mountain on the North side, and Pisgah and the Mauch Chunk Range on the south valley. The saddle pass between the northern ridges topped by Summit Hill, and Lansford, Pennsylvania generated the springs and run off of Panther Creek which runs nearly due west into the Little Schuylkill River at Tamaqua, Pennsylvania which path eventually allowed conventional steam powered rail trackage to be built into the valley after a convoluted and lengthy path around and between Nesquehoning Ridge and Broad Mountain via Delano Junction, a railroad nexus still in use today.
