= Lehighton, Pennsylvania =

Borough in Pennsylvania, US

- Borough
- Flag Seal

- Location of Lehighton in Carbon County, Pennsylvania

- Location of Lehighton in Pennsylvania Lehighton (the United States)
- Coordinates: 40°49′55″N 75°42′53″W
- Country: United States
- State: Pennsylvania
- County: Carbon

Government
  - Mayor: Ryan Saunders

Area
  - Total: 1.65 sq mi (4.28 km^{2})
  - Land: 1.62 sq mi (4.20 km^{2})
  - Water: 0.027 sq mi (0.07 km^{2})
- Elevation: 570 ft (170 m)

Population (2020)
  - Total: 5,248
  - Density: 3,233.4/sq mi (1,248.41/km^{2})
- Time zone: UTC-5 (EST)
  - Summer (DST): UTC-4 (EDT)
- ZIP code: 18235
- Area codes: 610
- FIPS code: 42-42472
- Website: lehightonborough.org

Lehighton (/liˈhaɪtən/) is a borough in Carbon County, Pennsylvania.

Due in part to water power from the Lehigh River, Lehighton was an early center for U.S. industrialization. The Lehigh Valley Railroad was for years a major employer up until the post-World War II era when railroad and industry restructuring led to job and population losses.

As of the 2020 U.S. census, Lehighton's population was 5,248. Lehighton is the most populous borough in Carbon County and still the county's business hub. The Lehigh River, a 109-mile-long (175 km) tributary of the Delaware River, flows through Lehighton.

== History ==
At the time of the first European's encounters with indigenous American tribes, this area was part of the shared hunting territory of the Iroquoian Susquehannock and the Algonquian Lenape peoples, who were often at odds. The Lenape are also called the Delaware, after their language and territory along the Delaware River.

Close relatives of the peoples of New England and along the St. Lawrence Valley of Canada occupied much of the coastal mid-Atlantic area in Delaware, New Jersey, Eastern Pennsylvania, and lower eastern New York, including Long Island. The Susquehannock confederacy's homelands were mainly along the Susquehanna River, from the Mohawk Valley in lower New York southerly to the Chesapeake and Virginia's Shenandoah Valley, but may have ranged into the empty lands of West Virginia, Eastern Ohio, and Western Pennsylvania.

The Dutch and Swedes first settled the Delaware Valley and found the area north of the Lehigh Gap to be lightly occupied, probably by transients, but traveled regularly by the Susquehannock. This tribe traveled quite a bit according to the American Heritage Book of Indians, including being described in lofty terms by John Smith when a band visited the new Jamestown, Virginia colony. In the decades of the Beaver Wars in the mid-1600s, the Susquehannocks conquered and made the Lenape a tributary tribe — and also nearly inflicted an overwhelming defeat on the powerful Iroquois Confederacy. Shortly thereafter, the Susquehannocks suffered a reversal, falling first to epidemic disease that raged for three years which killed off perhaps 90% of their population, and a series of battles on most of their frontiers as various enemies took advantage. This vacated the southeastern and central Pennsylvania regions for the Delaware peoples. However, all tribes were thereafter displaced westwards by continued colonial growth. Delaware dominance at the time of European colonization is why William Penn's settlers adopted Lenape Lenki (Delaware) names for landscape features, and less than a handful of Susquehannock names.

Lehighton was built on the site of the German Moravian Brethren's mission station "Gnadenhütten" (cabins of grace) founded in 1746. It was established as a mission to the Lenape by Moravians from Bethlehem, Pennsylvania, lower on the Lehigh River. The German name was transcribed as "Canatanheat" by missionary John Brainerd.

During the French and Indian Wars (Seven Years' War), Native allies of the French killed 11 missionaries during the Gnadenhütten massacre on 24 November 1755. They destroyed the mission village, and only four of the sixteen residents escaped. (During the American Revolutionary War in 1782, Pennsylvania militia raided another Moravian mission village, also called Gnadenhutten, in present-day Ohio. Suspecting the Lenape of being allied with the British, the militia killed 96 unarmed men, women, and children in what became better known as the Gnadenhutten massacre.)

The Lehigh River was a source of water power for developing industries in the 19th century. Lehighton had silk and lace mills, a meat-packing house, shirt factory, automatic-press works, car shops, stoneworks, and foundries. In 1900, the population was 4,629 people. By 1940, it had reached 6,615.

The coming of the railroad made it easier for residents to get their products to major markets. For many years, the Lehigh Valley Railroad had a major repair facility in Lehighton. The coming of the railroad was a major economic boost for the town. It was the area's largest company, employing several thousand workers at the repair facilities or operating and maintaining the railroad. Restructuring in the railroad industry led to the repair facilities being moved to another location. Lost jobs meant that some people had to relocate for work.

The Lehighton downtown declined after the Carbon Plaza Mall was built in nearby Mahoning Township. Suburban housing developed, pulling more businesses from downtown. After struggling for three decades, the downtown is experiencing a rebirth as people appreciate the qualities of a compact central location, royalty and historic architecture.

== Geography ==
Lehighton is located in southern Carbon County at 40°49′55″N 75°42′53″W (40.831932, -75.714701). It is in Northeastern Pennsylvania 117 miles (188 km) west of New York City and 37 miles (60 km) south of Wilkes-Barre. The borough is situated on the west bank of the Lehigh River at an elevation ranging from 470 feet (140 m) above sea level at the river up to 725 feet (221 m) near the northwest part of town by Mahoning Township border.

According to the United States Census Bureau, the borough has a total area of 1.65 square miles (4.28 km^{2}), of which 1.62 square miles (4.20 km^{2}) is land and 0.03 square miles (0.07 km^{2}), or 1.69%, is water. Lehighton is located 3 miles (5 km) south of Jim Thorpe, the county seat, and 7 miles (11 km) northwest of Palmerton. Lehighton is bordered on the north, west, and south by Mahoning Township and across the Lehigh River on the east by Weissport and Franklin Township.

Lehighton is primarily very green and hilly. The town and its outlying communities are in the Ridge-and-Valley region of the Appalachian Mountains. The Appalachian Trail, a long-distance hiking trail extending from Maine to Georgia, is located south of town near Palmerton.

== Climate ==
The region has large seasonal temperature differences, with warm to hot (and often humid) summers and cold (sometimes severely cold) winters. The Köppen climate classification subtype for this climate is "Dfb" (Warm Summer Continental Climate).

Snowfall is variable, with some winters bringing moderate snow and others bringing numerous significant snowstorms. Average snowfall is 50.4 inches (128 cm) per year, with the months of January and February receiving the highest at just over 15 and 13 inches (38 and 33 cm) respectively. Rainfall is generally spread throughout the year, with eight to twelve wet days per month, at an average annual rate of 43.52 inches (110.54 cm).

Typically, summer lasts from late May until mid September. The humidity is high only for one to two days at a time. Winter lasts from November through March and varies greatly in length and severity. Snowfall can occur anytime from mid-October to as late as April. Spring and autumn are both short and highly variable. The autumn foliage season is only two to three weeks long and is at its peak anytime from early to mid-October.

Winter daytime highs average 27.8 °F (−2.3 °C) in January and the lows are 13.9 °F (−10.1 °C). Summer daytime highs average 81.2 °F (27.3 °C) in July and the lows are 55.6 °F (13.1 °C).

Climate data for Lehighton, Pennsylvania
Month	Jan	Feb	Mar	Apr	May	Jun	Jul	Aug	Sep	Oct	Nov	Dec	Year
Record high °F (°C)	66 (19)	72 (22)	80 (27)	94 (34)	93 (34)	93 (34)	100 (38)	101 (38)	95 (35)	83 (28)	76 (24)	71 (22)	101 (38)
Mean daily maximum °F (°C)	34.8 (1.6)	38.2 (3.4)	47.9 (8.8)	61.3 (16.3)	70.5 (21.4)	77.7 (25.4)	82.5 (28.1)	80.7 (27.1)	73.6 (23.1)	62.2 (16.8)	50.6 (10.3)	40.3 (4.6)	60.0 (15.6)
Mean daily minimum °F (°C)	19.5 (−6.9)	20.3 (−6.5)	27.8 (−2.3)	37.9 (3.3)	48.2 (9.0)	57.5 (14.2)	62.5 (16.9)	60.6 (15.9)	53.5 (11.9)	42.1 (5.6)	32.1 (0.1)	24.7 (−4.1)	40.4 (4.7)
Record low °F (°C)	−21 (−29)	−17 (−27)	−10 (−23)	7 (−14)	23 (−5)	34 (1)	36 (2)	41 (5)	29 (−2)	17 (−8)	0 (−18)	−12 (−24)	−21 (−29)
Average precipitation inches (mm)	3.52 (89)	2.97 (75)	3.84 (98)	3.83 (97)	4.42 (112)	4.49 (114)	4.69 (119)	4.66 (118)	4.51 (115)	3.90 (99)	3.98 (101)	4.08 (104)	48.89 (1,241)
Average snowfall inches (cm)	9.8 (25)	10.1 (26)	6.1 (15)	0.5 (1.3)	0.0 (0.0)	0.0 (0.0)	0.0 (0.0)	0.0 (0.0)	0.0 (0.0)	0.2 (0.51)	1.0 (2.5)	5.2 (13)	32.9 (83.31)
Average precipitation days (≥ 0.01 in)	11.2	10.2	11.1	11.3	12.4	11.2	10.5	9.4	9.9	8.7	10.0	11.0	126.9
Average snowy days (≥ 0.1 in)	8.7	7.9	4.8	1.4	0	0	0	0	0	1.1	3.8	5.3	32.0
Source: National Weather Service

== Demographics ==
Historical population
Census	Pop.	Note	%±
1850	267		—
1870	1,485		—
1880	1,937		30.4%
1890	2,959		52.8%
1900	4,629		56.4%
1910	5,316		14.8%
1920	6,102		14.8%
1930	6,490		6.4%
1940	6,615		1.9%
1950	6,565		−0.8%
1960	6,318		−3.8%
1970	6,095		−3.5%
1980	5,826		−4.4%
1990	5,914		1.5%
2000	5,537		−6.4%
2010	5,500		−0.7%
2020	5,248		−4.6%

As of the census of 2000, there were 5,537 people, 2,362 households, and 1,506 families residing in the borough. The population density was 3,230.8 inhabitants per square mile (1,247.4/km^{2}). There were 2,546 housing units at an average density of 1,485.6 per square mile (573.6/km^{2}). The racial makeup of the borough was 98.32% White, 1.34% African-American, 1.05% Native American, 1.45% Asian, 1.09% Pacific Islander, 1.04% from other races, and 1.70% from two or more races. Hispanic or Latino of any race were 1.67% of the population. The plurality of Lehighton residents are of Irish descent. There are also substantial populations of Italian, Polish, German and Slovak heritage.

There were 2,362 households, out of which 27.7% had children under the age of 18 living with them, 45.8% were married couples living together, 13.8% had a female householder with no husband present, and 36.2% were non-families. 31.6% of all households were made up of individuals, and 17.2% had someone living alone who was 65 years of age or older. The average household size was 2.31 and the average family size was 2.87.

In the borough the population was spread out, with 22.6% under the age of 18, 7.3% from 18 to 24, 27.3% from 25 to 44, 21.7% from 45 to 64, and 21.1% who were 65 years of age or older. The median age was 40 years. For every 100 females, there were 87.1 males. For every 100 females age 18 and over, there were 82.5 males.

The median income for a household in the borough was $28,566, and the median income for a family was $35,673. Males had a median income of $30,590 versus $22,466 for females. The per capita income for the borough was $14,861. About 10.8% of families and 14.3% of the population were below the poverty line, including 24.9% of those under age 18 and 6.0% of those age 65 or over.

== Media ==
Lehighton is home to the Times News newspaper, published six days a week, serving five counties.

In 1949, the Mahoning Drive-In Theater opened in Lehighton. Though its popularity waned with the advent of multiplex theaters in the 1970s and 1980s, it has seen a resurgence in popularity since 2014, due to the management's decision to screen primarily older cult films and B movies as opposed to newer releases.

In 1962, the town's local AM radio station signed on as daytimer WYNS on 1150 AM. The station later moved down the dial to 1160 AM, and in 2005, its call letters were changed to WBYN. Beginning in September 2019, the station began a simulcast of news-talk station WEEU in Reading. Following a failed ownership transfer, the station went silent in September 2020, and its broadcast license was officially deleted by the FCC in October 2021.

== Transportation ==
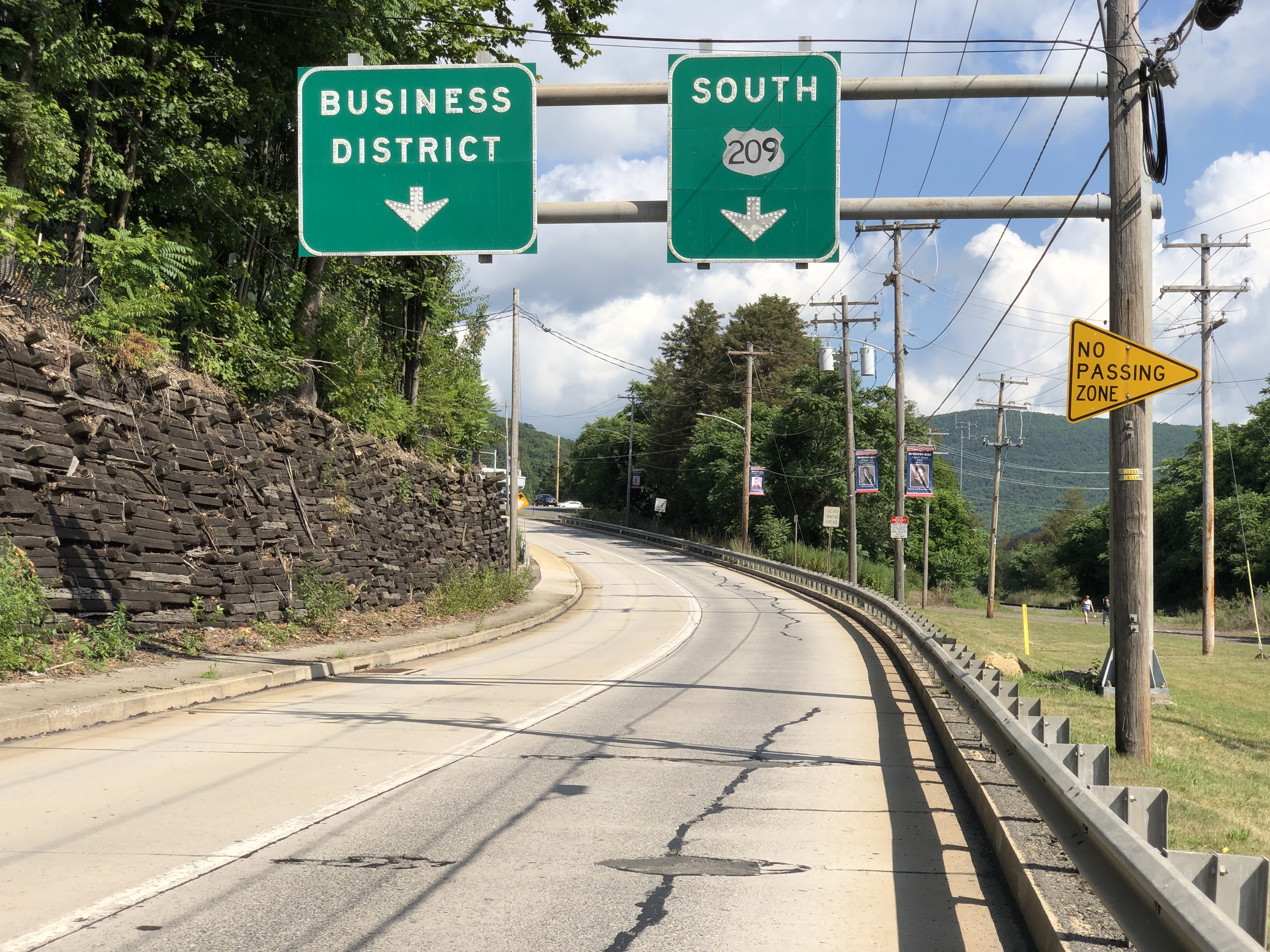
US 209 southbound in Lehighton

As of 2007, there were 21.24 miles (34.18 km) of public roads in Lehighton, of which 4.01 miles (6.45 km) were maintained by the Pennsylvania Department of Transportation (PennDOT) and 17.23 miles (27.73 km) were maintained by the borough.

U.S. Route 209 is the most prominent highway serving Lehighton. It follows First Street, Sergeant Stanley Hoffman Boulevard, Bankway and Bridge Street through the eastern portion of borough. Pennsylvania Route 443 begins at US 209 in the southeastern portion of the borough and heads southwest along Blakeslee Boulevard. Pennsylvania Route 902 begins at PA 443 in the southwestern part of the borough. It follows Ninth Street north and then Mahoning Street west. Interstate 476, the Pennsylvania Turnpike Northeast Extension, passes to the east of the borough and is accessible via US 209.

Carbon Transit provides bus service to Lehighton along Route 701, which runs between Coaldale and Palmerton on Mondays, Wednesdays, and Fridays, and Route 702, which runs between Nesquehoning and Palmerton Monday-Friday. Fullington Trailways provides daily bus service to destinations in New York and Pennsylvania. Passenger rail service ended in 1961 when the Lehigh Valley Railroad, once a major employer in the area, discontinued all passenger service over its route.

Jake Arner Memorial Airport (22N) is located 3 miles (5 km) west-southwest of town, with a 3,000-foot (910 m) asphalt runway and two RNAV instrument approaches.

== In popular culture ==
It is depicted in the mural Lehighton by Franz Kline who grew up in the borough.

== Notable people ==
- D. M. Balliet, former college football coach
- Mike Bugarewicz, NASCAR crew chief
- Kerry Getz, professional skateboarder
- Christian Hackenberg, former professional football player
- Franz Kline, artist
- Denny Seiwell, drummer for Paul McCartney and Wings
