= Panther Valley High School =

Coordinates: 40.8423°N 75.8502°W

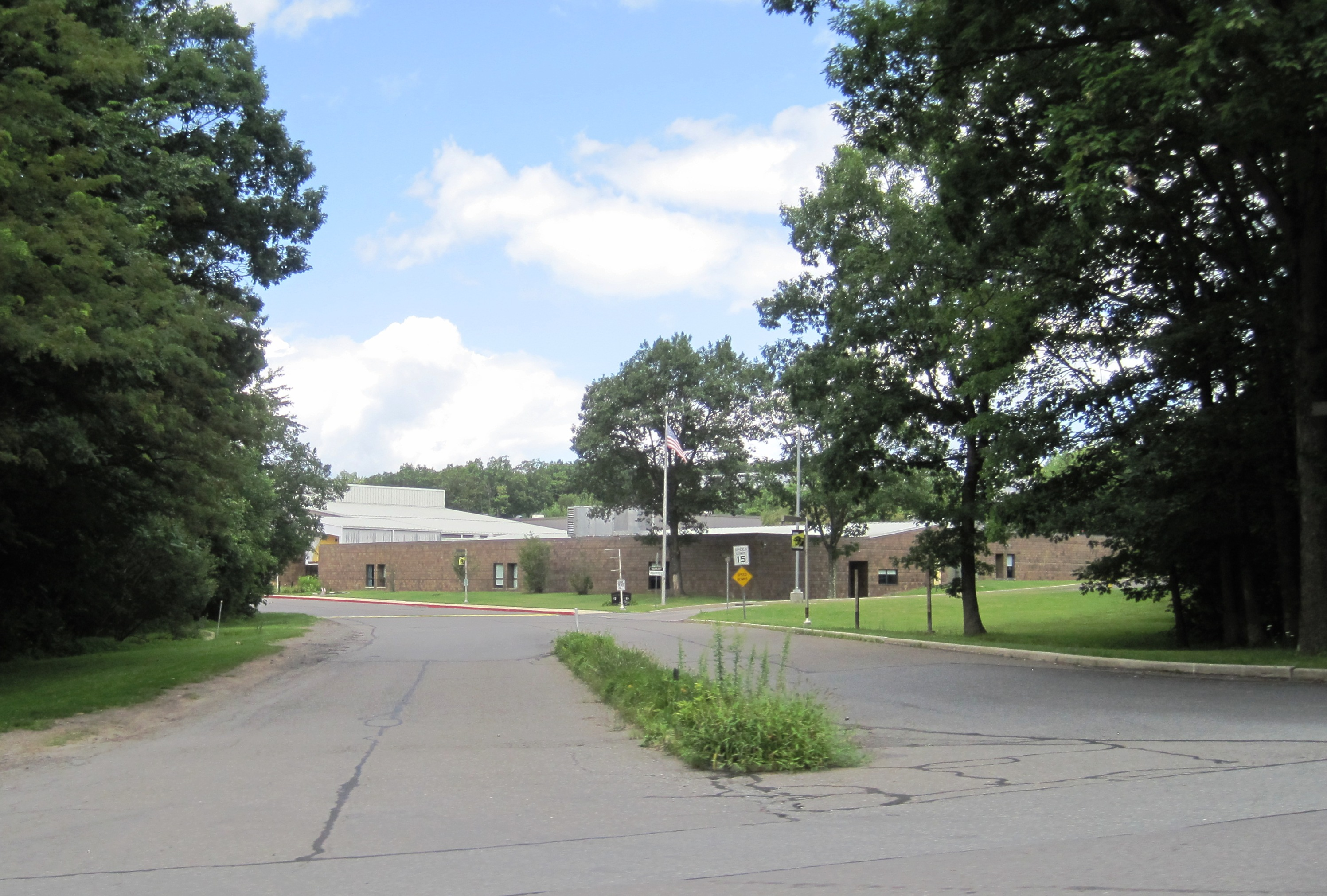
- Entrance to the school

Location
- 912 Coal Region Way; Lansford, Pennsylvania 18232; United States

Information
- School type: Public high school
- Established: 1973; 53 years ago
- School district: Panther Valley School District
- Principal: Patricia Ebbert
- Teaching staff: 46.00 (on an FTE basis)
- Grades: 7–12
- Enrollment: 781 (2023–2024)
- Student to teacher ratio: 16.98
- Campus type: Rural: Fringe
- Colors: Black, Gold, and White
- Mascot: Panther
- Website: pvhs.sharpschool.net/home

Panther Valley Junior Senior High School is a small public high school providing grades 7 to 12, in Summit Hill, Pennsylvania, in Carbon County, Pennsylvania. Although its mailing address shows Lansford, PA the high school is physically located within the borough limits of Summit Hill, PA. It is the only high school for the Panther Valley School District and serves students from both Carbon County and Schuylkill County, Pennsylvania.

According to the National Center for Education Statistics, the school reported an enrollment of 730 pupils in grades 7 through 12 in the 2020-21 school year.

For much of the school's history, Panther Valley High School served students in grades nine through twelve. In 2015, a two-story annex was built, and grades seven and eight were moved into the building from the Intermediate School. Following this change, the school's official name was changed to "Panther Valley Junior Senior High School," though it is often referred to simply as "Panther Valley High School."

The building houses six science labs, thirty general classrooms, an art room, a music room, an industrial arts shop, an auditorium with accompanying large-group classrooms, a gymnasium with locker rooms, and a cafeteria.

== Extracurriculars ==
The district offers a wide variety of clubs, activities and after-school sports.

=== Athletics ===
Panther Valley competes in the Pennsylvania Interscholastic Athletic Association's District XI.

Panther Valley has high school teams in the following sports:

- Football
- Baseball
- Basketball
- Cheerleading
- Softball
- Track and Field
- Volleyball
- Wrestling

== Notable alumni ==
- Gene Snitsky, professional wrestler
