= GRAIL =

NASA orbiter mission to the Moon (2011–2012)

Gravity Recovery and Interior Laboratory
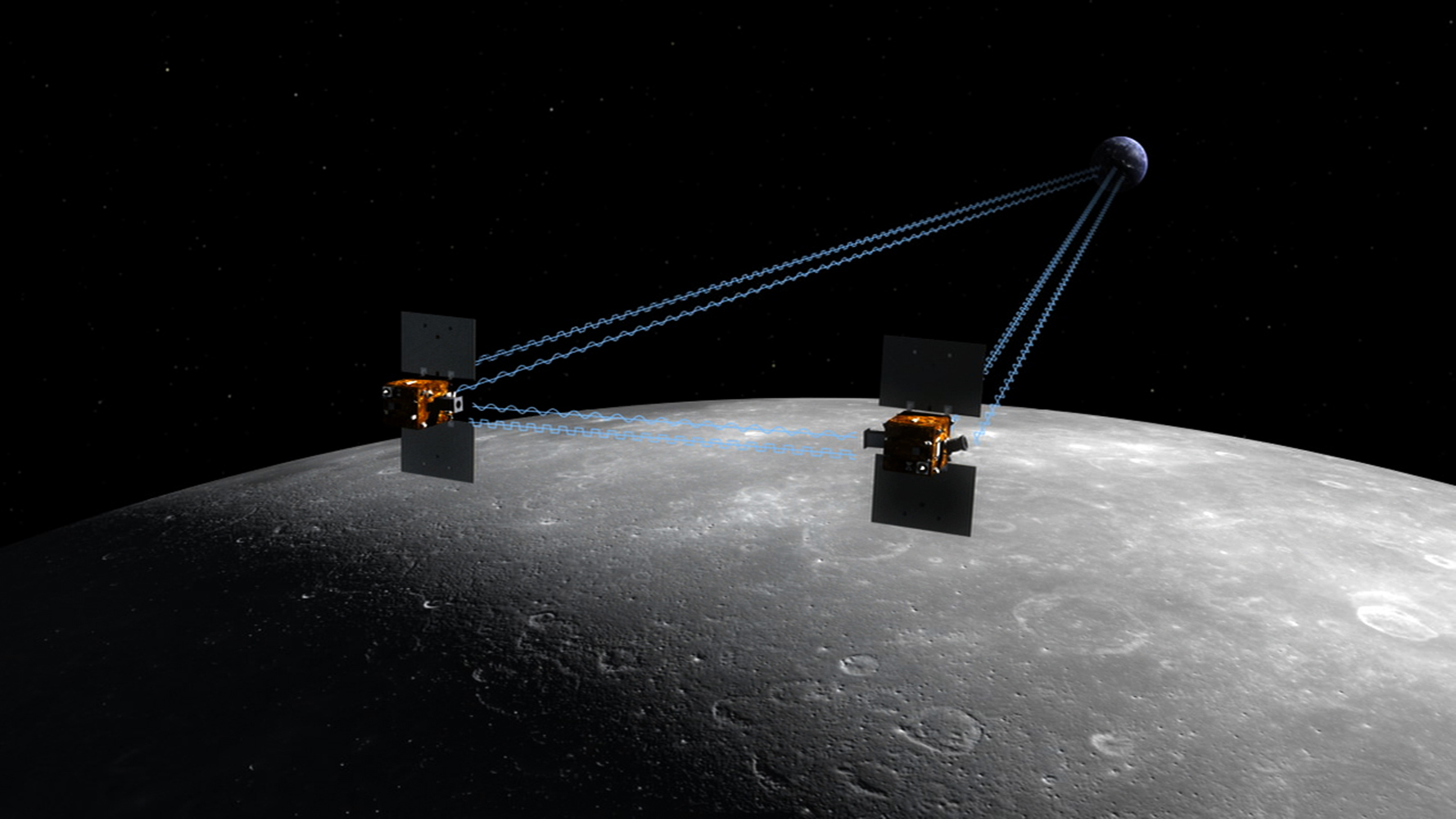
- Artist's interpretation of the GRAIL tandem spacecraft above the lunar surface
- Names: GRAIL
- Mission type: Lunar orbiters
- Operator: NASA / JPL
- COSPAR ID: 2011-046A; 2011-046B
- SATCAT no.: 37801; 37802
- Website: moon.mit.edu
- Mission duration: 1 year, 3 months and 7 days

Spacecraft properties
- Bus: XSS-11
- Manufacturer: MIT; Lockheed Martin
- Launch mass: 202.4 kg (each)
- Dry mass: 132.6 kg (292 lb)
- Power: (Solar array / Li-ion battery)

Start of mission
- Launch date: September 10, 2011, 13:08:52.775 UTC
- Rocket: Delta II 7920H-10; D-356
- Launch site: Cape Canaveral SLC-17B
- Contractor: United Launch Alliance
- Entered service: December 31, 2011 (Ebb); January 1, 2012 (Flow)

End of mission
- Disposal: Deorbited
- Decay date: December 17, 2012

Orbital parameters
- Reference system: Selenocentric
- Regime: Polar orbit
- Semi-major axis: 1,788.0 km (1,111.0 mi)
- Periselene altitude: 25 km (16 mi)
- Aposelene altitude: 86 km (53 mi)
- Period: 113 minutes

Lunar impactor
- Spacecraft component: Ebb
- Impact date: December 17, 2012, 22:28:51 UTC
- Impact site: 75.6083°N 33.4043°E

Lunar impactor
- Spacecraft component: Flow
- Impact date: December 17, 2012, 22:29:21 UTC
- Impact site: 75.6504°N 33.1643°E
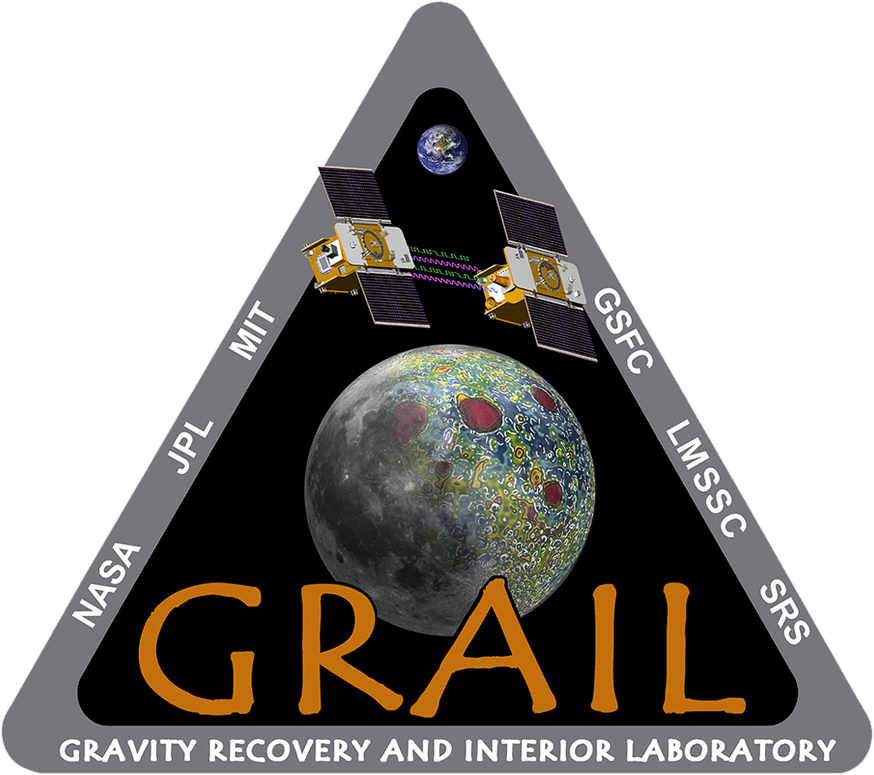
- Discovery Program

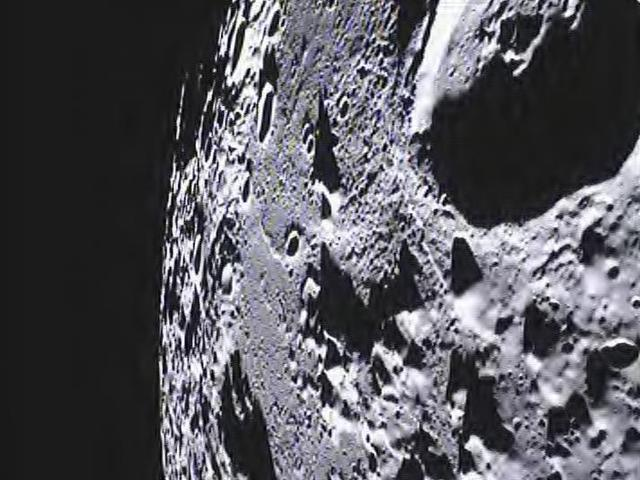
MoonKAM shot

The Gravity Recovery and Interior Laboratory (GRAIL) was an American lunar science mission in NASA's Discovery Program which used high-quality gravitational field mapping of the Moon to determine its interior structure. The two small spacecraft, GRAIL A (Ebb) and GRAIL B (Flow), were launched on 10 September 2011 aboard a single launch vehicle: the most-powerful configuration of a Delta II, the 7920H-10. GRAIL A separated from the rocket about nine minutes after launch, GRAIL B followed about eight minutes later. They arrived at their orbits around the Moon 25 hours apart. The first probe entered orbit on 31 December 2011 and the second followed on 1 January 2012. The two spacecraft impacted the lunar surface on December 17, 2012.

== Overview ==
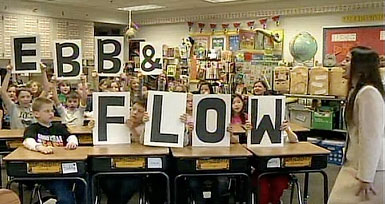
Fourth-grade students at Emily Dickinson Elementary School in Bozeman, Montana, who suggested the names Ebb and Flow

Maria Zuber of the Massachusetts Institute of Technology was GRAIL's principal investigator. NASA's Jet Propulsion Laboratory managed the project. NASA budgeted US$496 million for the program to include spacecraft and instrument development, launch, mission operations, and science support. Upon launch the spacecraft were named GRAIL A and GRAIL B and a contest was opened to school children to select names. Nearly 900 classrooms from 45 states, Puerto Rico and the District of Columbia, participated in the contest. The winning names, Ebb and Flow, were suggested by fourth grade students at Emily Dickinson Elementary School in Bozeman, Montana.

Each spacecraft transmitted and received telemetry from the other spacecraft and Earth-based facilities. By measuring the change in distance between the two spacecraft, the gravity field and geological structure of the Moon was obtained. The two spacecraft were able to detect very small changes in the distance between one another. Changes in distance as small as one micrometer were detectable and measurable. The gravitational field of the Moon was mapped in unprecedented detail.

== Objectives ==
- Map the structure of the lunar crust and lithosphere
- Understand the asymmetric thermal evolution of the Moon
- Determine the subsurface structure of impact basins and the origin of lunar mass concentrations (mascons)
- Ascertain the temporal evolution of crustal brecciation and magmatism
- Constrain the deep interior structure of the Moon
- Place limits on the size of the Moon's inner core

The data collection phase of the mission lasted from 7 March 2012 to 29 May 2012, for a total of 88 days. A second phase, at a lower altitude, of data collection began 31 August 2012, and was followed by 12 months of data analysis. On 5 December 2012 NASA released a gravity map of the Moon made from GRAIL data. The knowledge acquired will aid understanding of the evolutionary history of the terrestrial planets and computations of lunar orbits.

== Spacecraft ==
=== Instruments ===
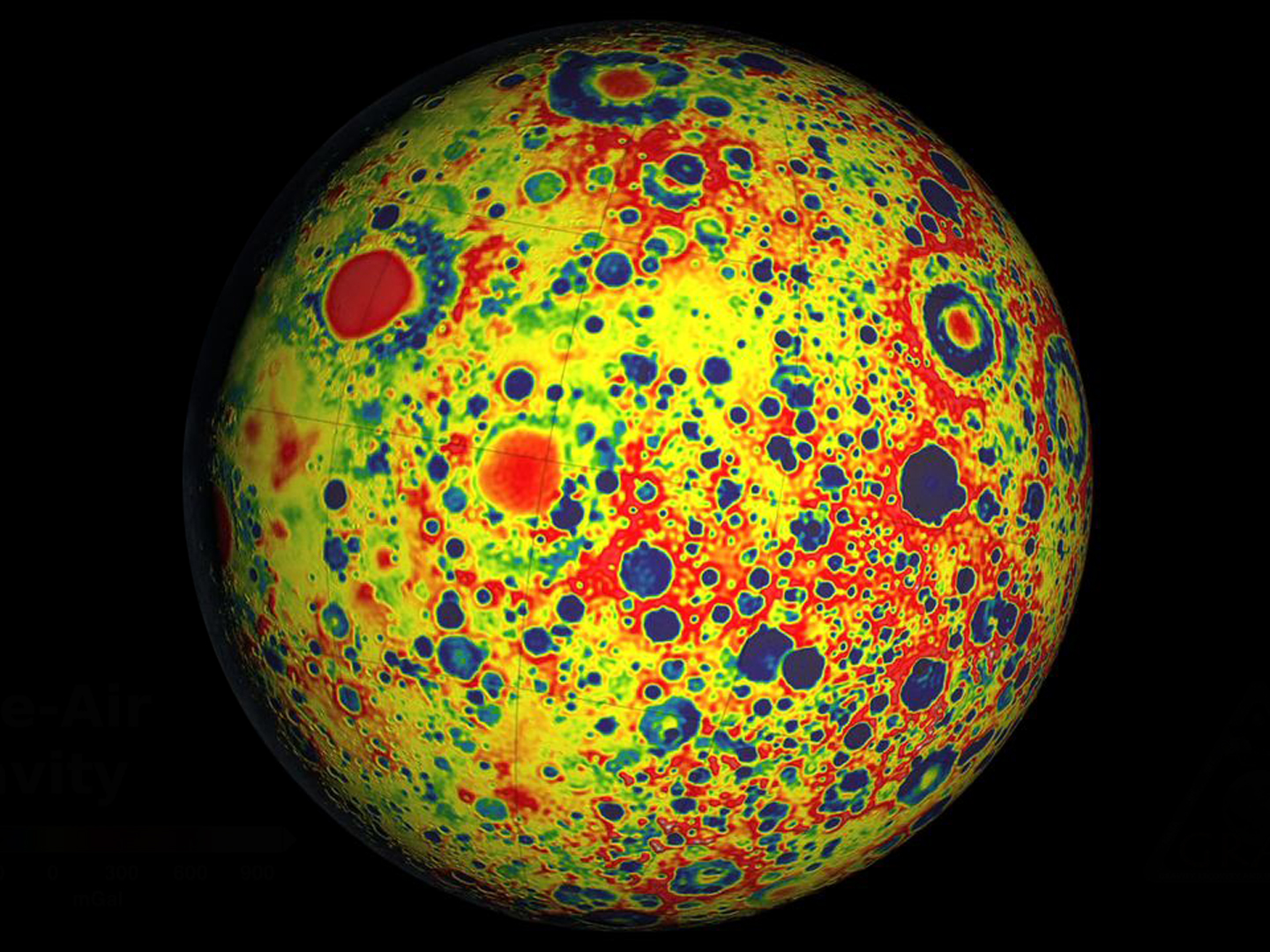
Gravity map of the Moon by GRAIL

- K_{a} band Lunar Gravity Ranging System (LGRS), derived from the Gravity Recovery and Climate Experiment (GRACE) instrument. 90% of the GRACE software was reused for GRAIL.
- Radio science beacon (RSB)
- Moon Knowledge Acquired by Middle school students (MoonKAM). Each MoonKAM system (one per spacecraft) consists of a digital video controller and four camera heads.

=== Propulsion ===
Thrusters aboard each spacecraft were capable of producing 22 newtons (4.9 lb_{f}). Each spacecraft was fueled with 103.5 kilograms (228 lb) of hydrazine, to be used by the thrusters and the main engine to enable the spacecraft to enter lunar orbit and transition to the science phase of its mission. The propulsion subsystem consisted of a main fuel tank and a helium-repressurization system which was activated shortly after lunar orbit insertion.

== Mission profile ==
=== Launch attempts ===
All times are in North American Eastern Daylight Time (EDT; UTC−4).

Attempt	Planned	Result	Turnaround	Reason	Decision point	Weather go (%)	Notes
1	8 Sep 2011, 8:37:06 am	Scrubbed	—	High-level winds	8 Sep 2011, 8:30 am	40%	A weather balloon was released minutes before the decision point to take readings of upper level winds, and Air Force weather reconnaissance aircraft were aloft beginning at 7 am.
2	8 Sep 2011, 9:16:12 am	Scrubbed	0 days 0 hours 39 minutes	High-level winds	8 Sep 2011, 9:07 am	40%	Range was reconfigured for omnidirectional antennae, instead of tracked ones, to support 99 degree azimuth.
3	9 Sep 2011, 8:33:25 am	Abandoned	0 days 23 hours 17 minutes	Rocket propulsion		40%	An issue with the rocket's propulsion system was detected while the Delta 2 rocket was drained of fuel.
4	10 Sep 2011, 8:29:45 am	Scrubbed	0 days 23 hours 56 minutes	High-level winds	10 Sep 2011, 8:21 am	60%	
5	10 Sep 2011, 9:08:52 am	Success	0 days 0 hours 39 minutes				

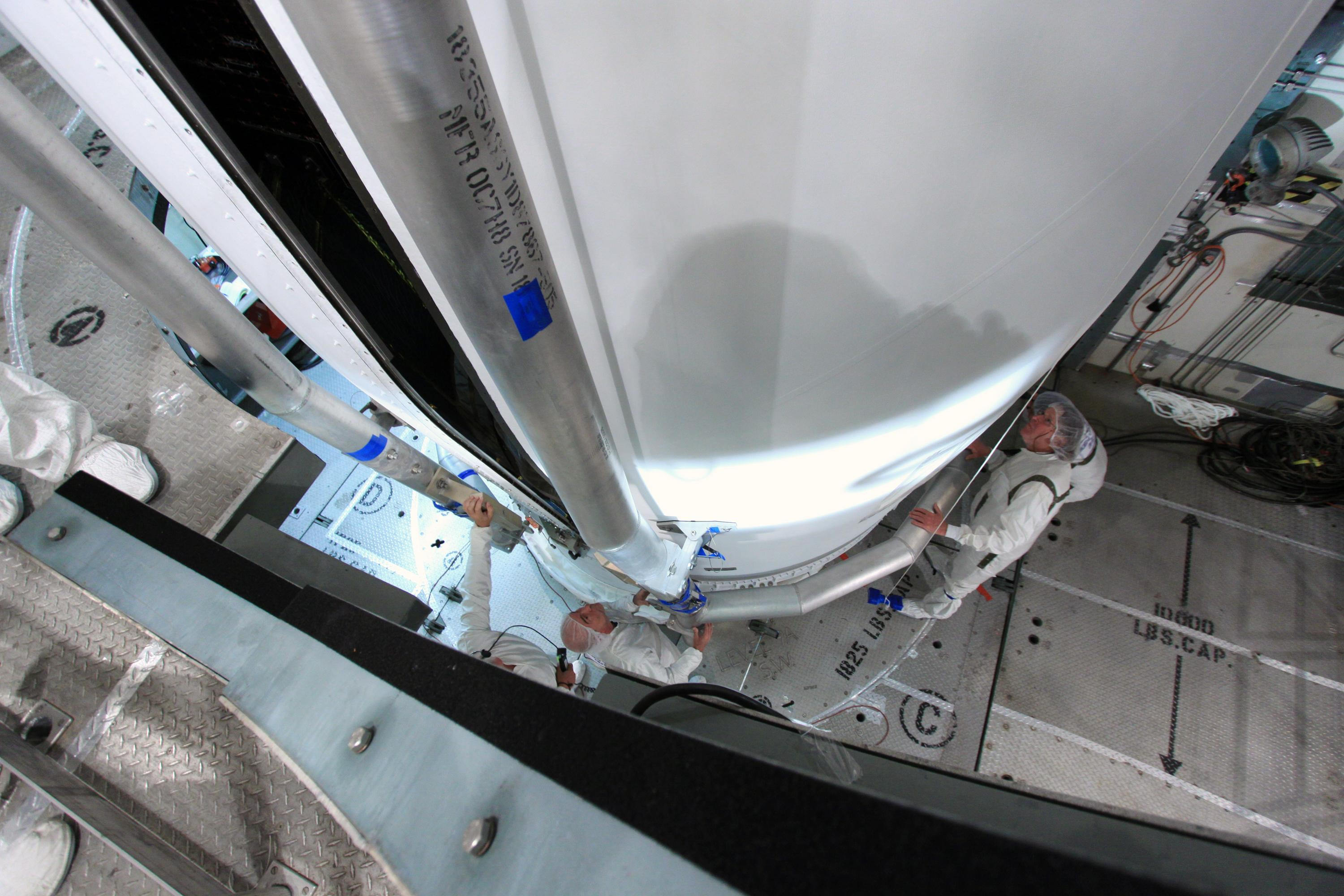
Spacecraft technicians close the payload fairing around GRAIL before launch.

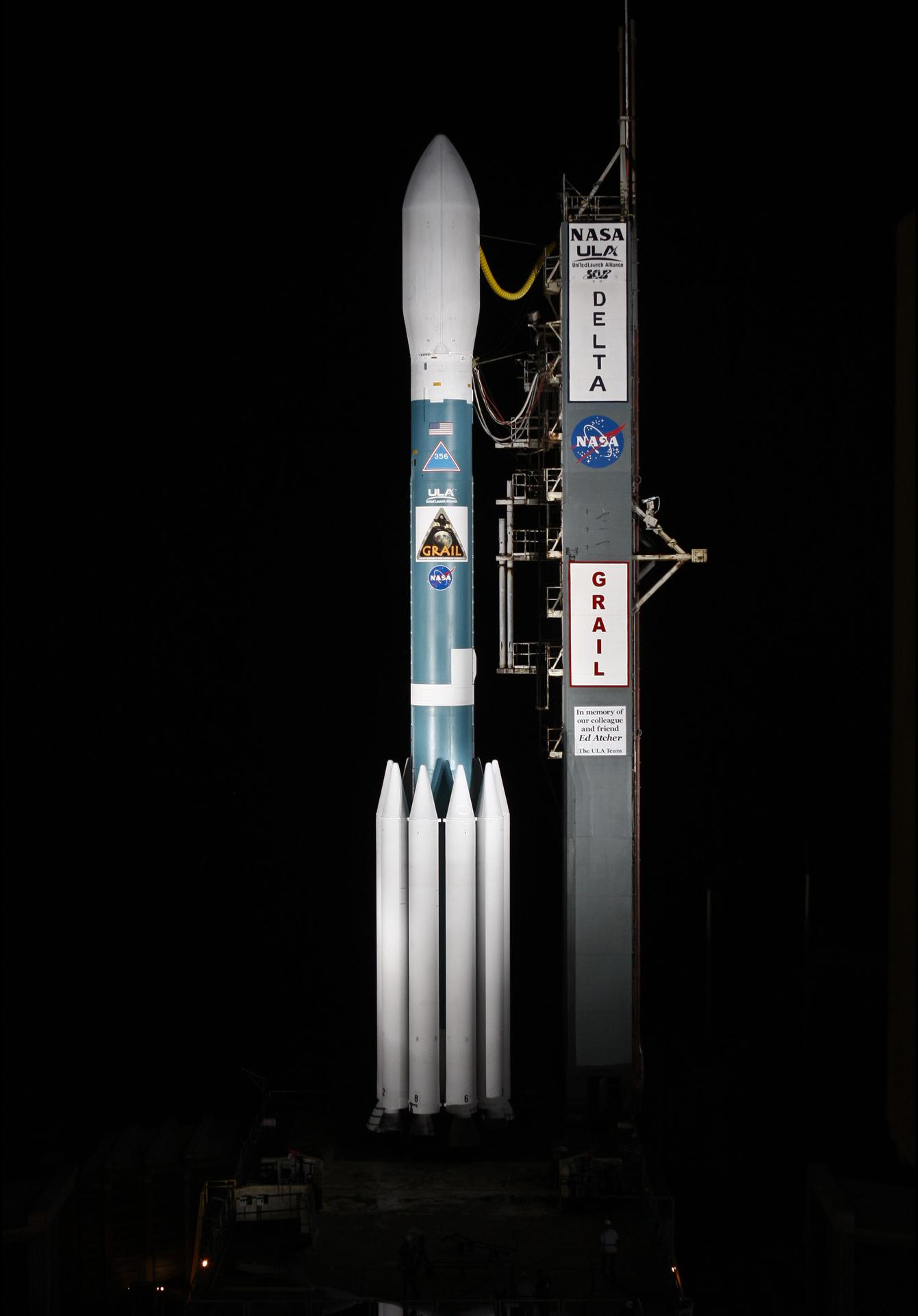
GRAIL awaits launch at Cape Canaveral Air Force Station.

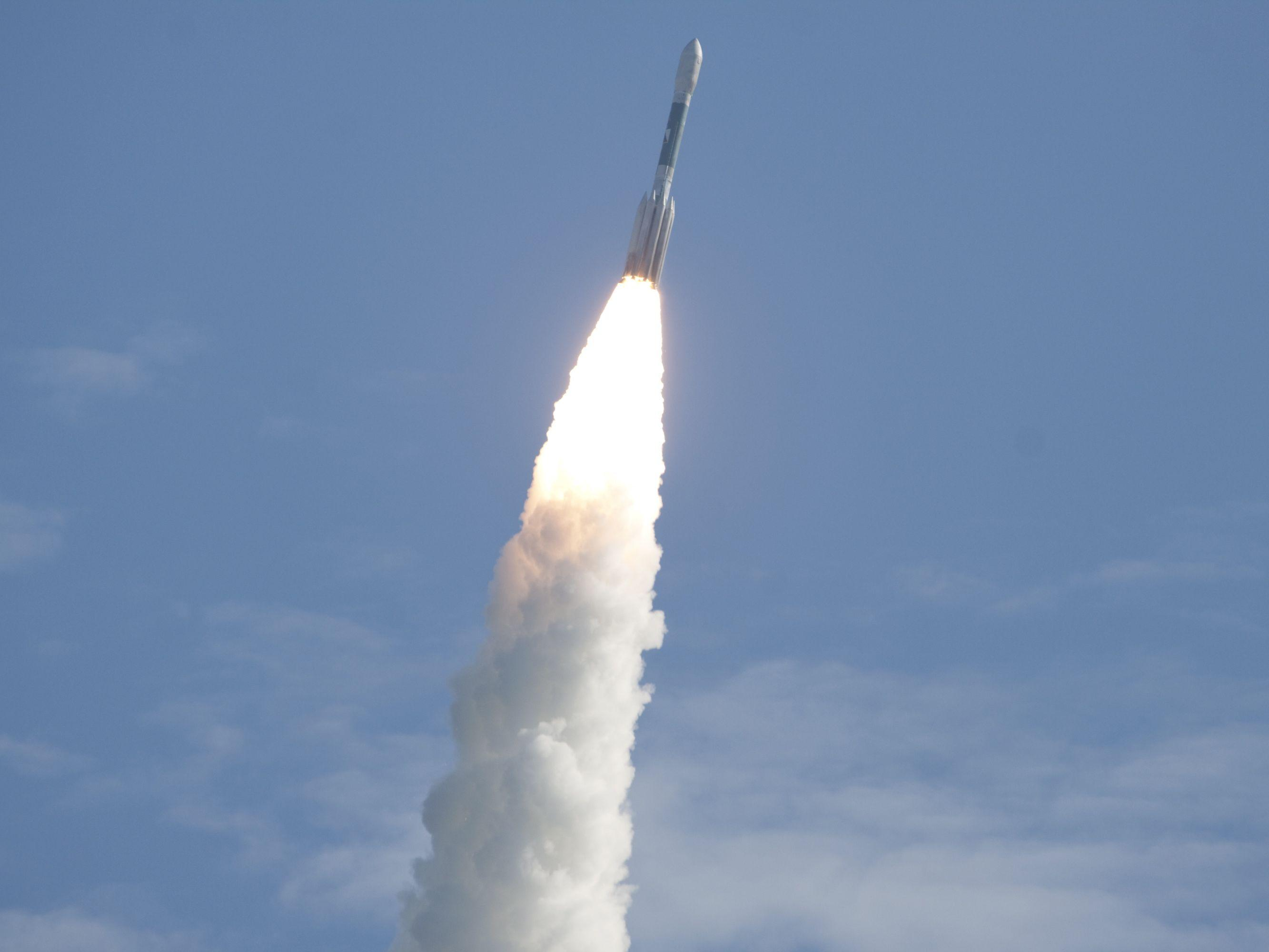
Fire and smoke light up a blue sky as a United Launch Alliance Delta II Heavy rocket propels GRAIL into space.

=== Transit phase ===
Animation of GRAIL-A's trajectory from 10 September 2011 to 17 December 2012 GRAIL-A · Moon · Earth

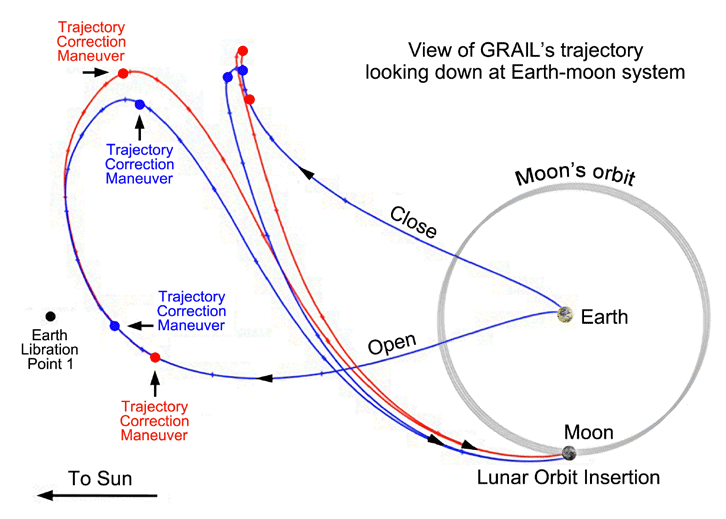
GRAIL Earth–Moon transit

Animation of GRAIL-A's trajectory around the Moon from 31 December 2011 to 30 April 2012 GRAIL-A · Moon

Unlike the Apollo program missions, which took three days to reach the Moon, GRAIL made use of a three- to four-month low-energy trans-lunar cruise well outside the Moon's orbit and passing near the Sun-Earth Lagrange point L1 before looping back to rendezvous with the Moon. This extended and circuitous trajectory enabled the mission to reduce fuel requirements, protect instruments and reduce the velocity of the two spacecraft at lunar arrival to help achieve the extremely low 50 km (31 mi) orbits with separation between the spacecraft (arriving 25 hours apart) of 175 to 225 km (109 to 140 mi). The very tight tolerances in the flight plan left little room for error correction leading to a launch window lasting one second and providing only two launch opportunities per day.

=== Science phase ===
The primary science phase of GRAIL lasted for 88 days, from 7 March 2012 to 29 May 2012. It was followed by a second science phase that ran from 8 Aug 2012 into early Dec 2012.

The gravity mapping technique was similar to that used by Gravity Recovery and Climate Experiment (GRACE), and the spacecraft design was based on XSS-11.

The orbital insertion dates were December 31, 2011 (for GRAIL-A) and January 1, 2012 (for GRAIL-B). The initial lunar orbits were highly elliptical near-polar, and were later lowered to near-circular at about 25-86 km altitude with a period of about 114 minutes.

The spacecraft were operated over the 88-day acquisition phase, divided into three 27.3 day long nadir-pointed mapping cycles. Twice each day there was an 8-hour pass in view of the Deep Space Network for transmission of science and "E/PO MoonKam" data.

The first student-requested MoonKam images were taken by Ebb from 2012 March 15–17 and downlinked to Earth March 20. More than 2,700 schools spanning 52 countries were using the MoonKAM cameras.

Footage of LRO by MoonKam

Flow's MoonKam camera captured the Lunar Reconnaissance Orbiter (LRO) as it flew by at a distance of about 12 miles (20 km) on May 3. It is the first footage of a moon-orbiting robotic spacecraft taken by another one.

=== Terminal phase ===
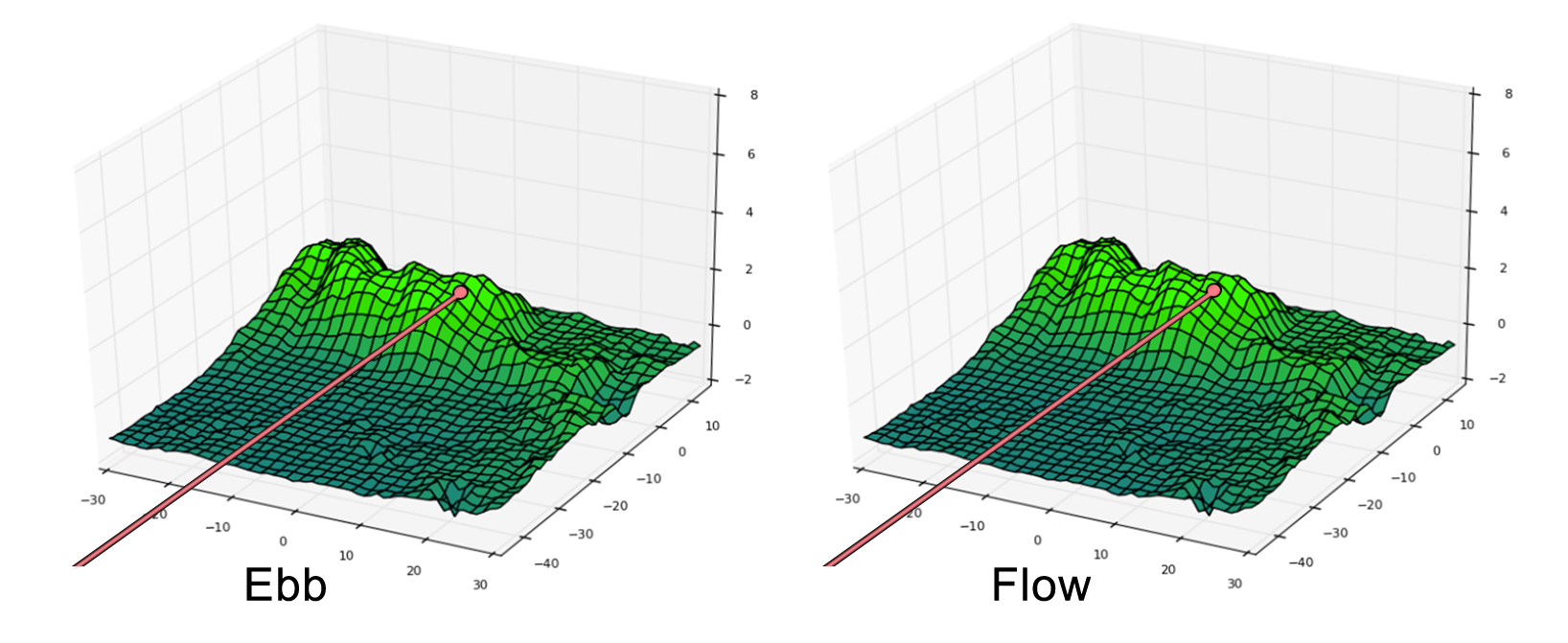
Ebb and Flow's final moments

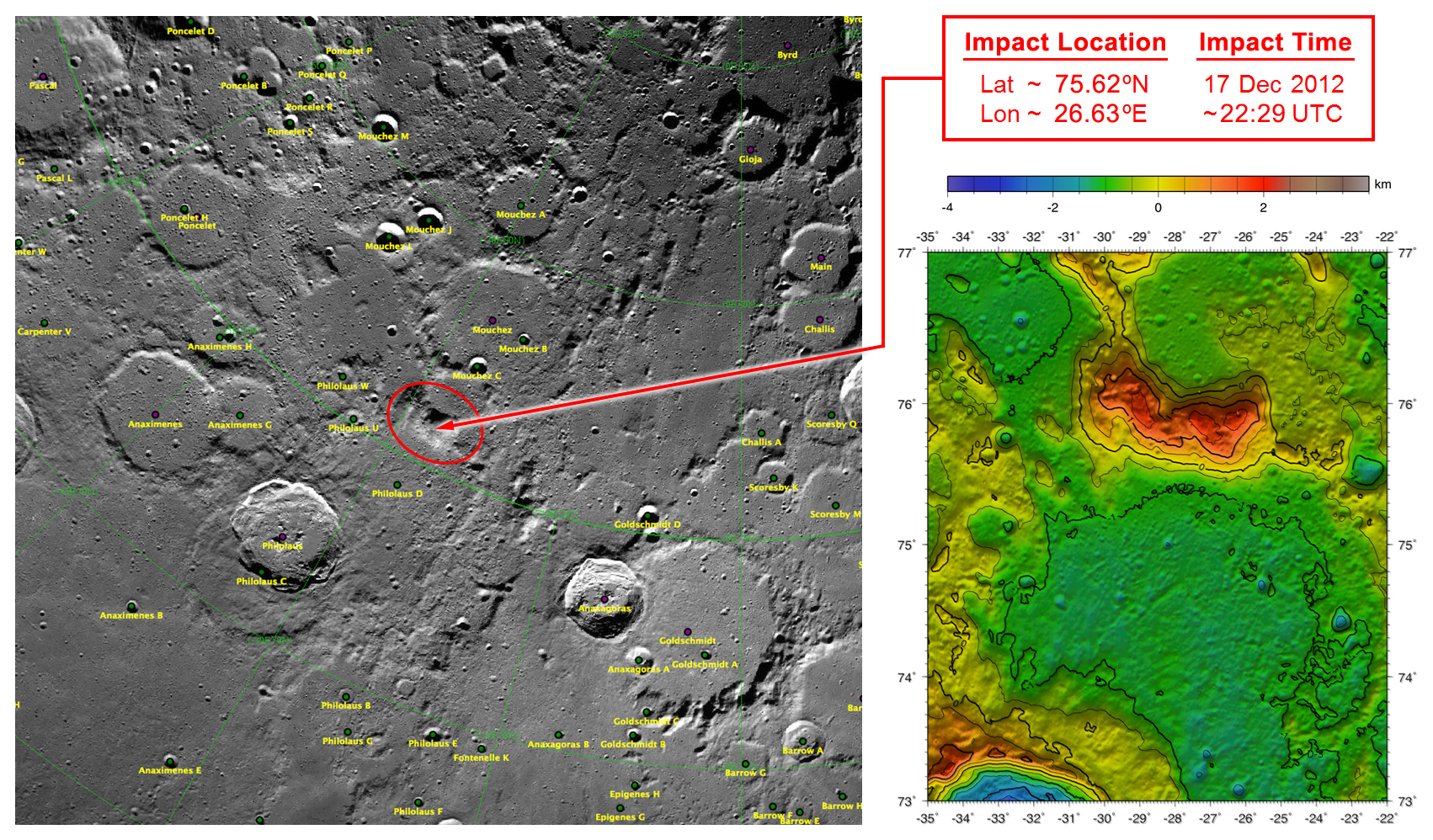
GRAIL's final resting spot

This animation shows the last three orbits of the spacecraft, with views of the impact site. The impact occurs on the night side of a waxing crescent Moon, so the view shifts from a natural color Moon to a false-color elevation map.

LRO flies over the north pole of the Moon, where it has a very good view of the GRAIL impact. The second part of this video is the view from LRO through LAMP's slit, showing the impact and the resulting plume.

=== Final experiment and mission end ===
At the end of the science phase and a mission extension, the spacecraft were powered down and decommissioned over a five-day period. The spacecraft impacted the lunar surface on December 17, 2012. Both spacecraft impacted an unnamed lunar mountain between Philolaus and Mouchez at 75.62°N 26.63°W. Ebb, the lead spacecraft in formation, impacted first. Flow impacted moments later. Each spacecraft was traveling at 3,760 miles per hour (1.68 km/s). A final experiment was conducted during the final days of the mission. Main engines aboard the spacecraft were fired, depleting remaining fuel. Data from that effort will be used by mission planners to validate fuel consumption computer models to improve predictions of fuel needs for future missions. NASA has announced that the crash site will be named after GRAIL collaborator and first American woman in space, Sally Ride.

Moon – Oceanus Procellarum ("Ocean of Storms")

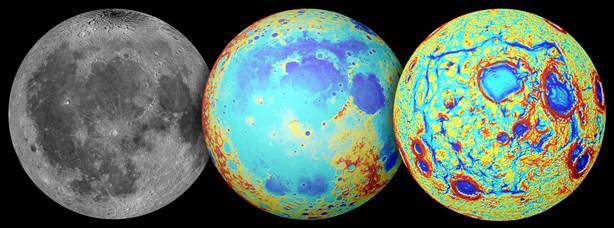
Ancient rift valleys: visible (left), topography (center), GRAIL gravity gradients (right), October 1, 2014

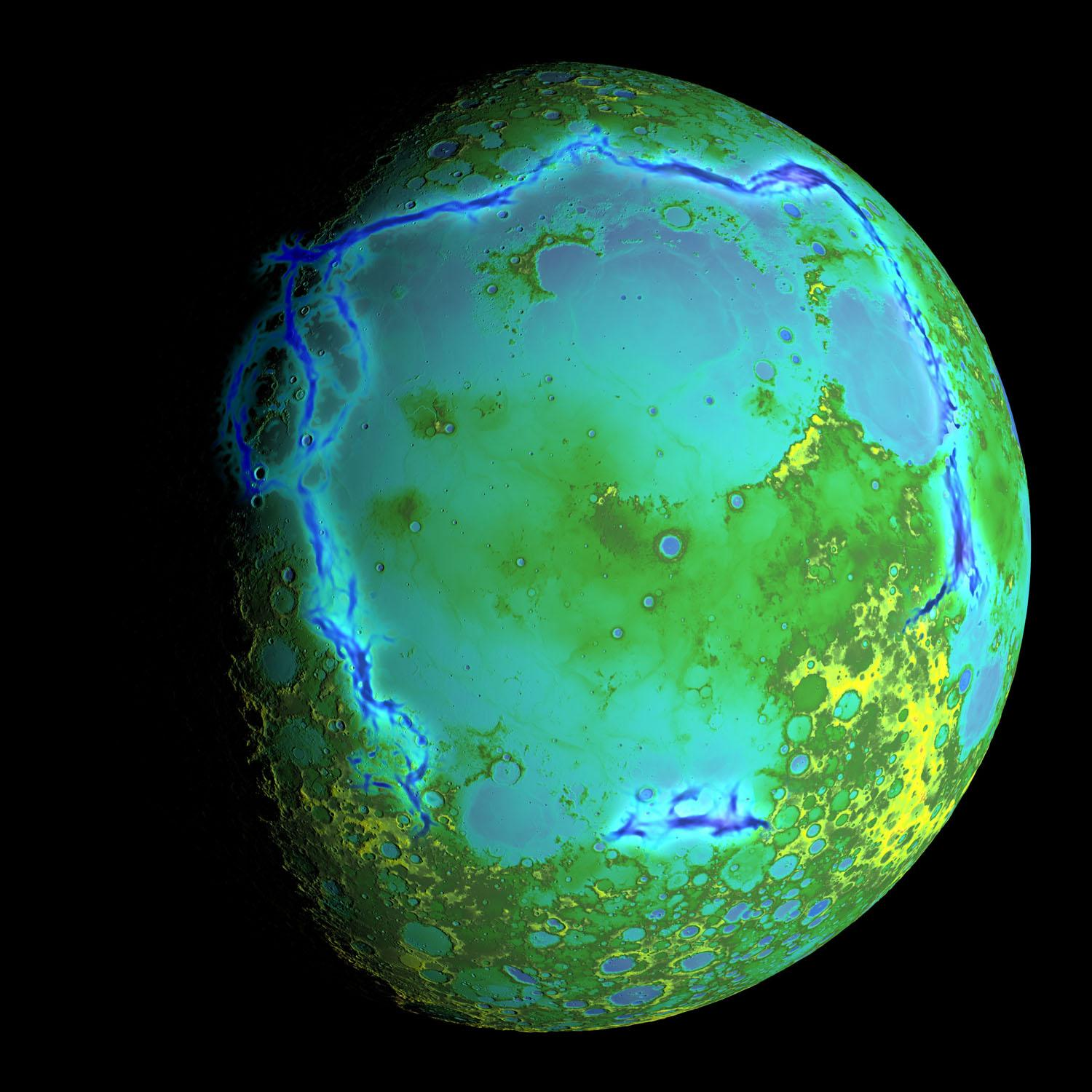
Ancient rift valleys, wide view

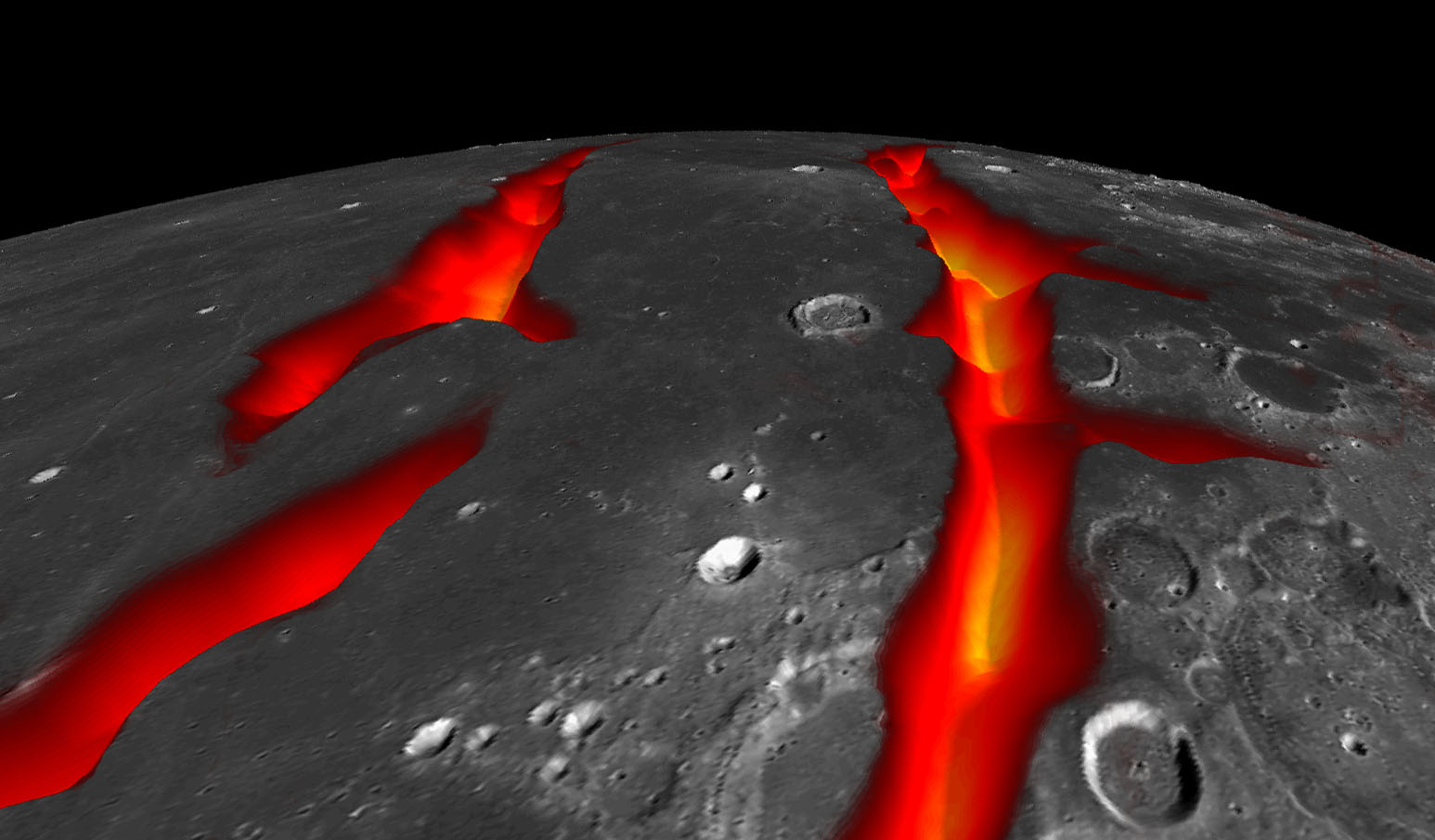
Ancient rift valleys, closeup, artist's concept

== Results ==
Gravity passes through matter. In addition to surface mass, a high-resolution gravity field gives a blurred, but useful, look below the surface. Analyses of the GRAIL data have produced a series of scientific results for the Moon.

- The resolution of the gravity field has improved by a large amount over pre-GRAIL results. Early analyses gave the gravitation of the Moon with fields of degree and order 420 and 660. Subsequent analyses have resulted in higher-degree and -order fields. Maps of the gravity field were made.
- The crustal density and porosity were determined. The crust was fragmented by large ancient impacts.
- Long narrow linear features were found that are interpreted to be ancient tabular intrusions or dikes formed by magma.
- Combining gravity and Lunar Laser Ranging data gives the three principal moments of inertia. The moments indicate that a dense core is small.
- Combining gravity and lunar Topography, 74 circular impact basins were identified. Strong increases in gravity that are associated with circular impact basins are mascons discovered by Muller and Sjogren. The strongest gravity anomalies are from basins filled with dense mare material, but the strong gravity also requires that the boundary between the crust and denser mantle be warped upward. Where the crust is thicker, there may be no mare fill but the crust-mantle boundary is still warped upward.
- The radius, density, and rigidity of interior layers is inferred.
- The Orientale basin is the youngest and best-preserved impact basin on the Moon. The gravity field of this three-ring basin was mapped at high resolution.

== See also ==
- List of artificial objects on the Moon
- List of NASA cameras on spacecraft
- List of missions to the Moon
- Satellite gravimetry
- Selenoid
