= Panther Valley School District =

School district in Pennsylvania, US

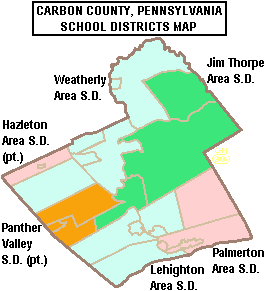
- Location of Panther Valley School District in Carbon County

Address
- 1 Panther Way Lansford, Pennsylvania Carbon County and Schuylkill County; United States

District information
- Type: Public
- Motto: Working together as a community to inspire each individual to achieve success through lifelong learning.
- Grades: K–12
- Established: 1964

Students and staff
- Colors: Black, Gold, and White

Other information
- Website: pvsd.sharpschool.net

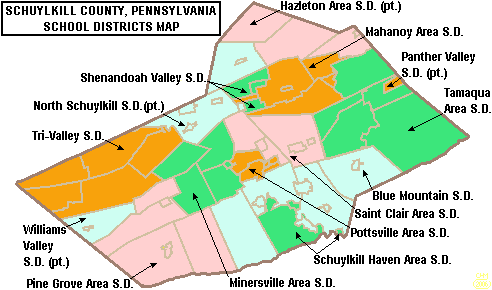
A map showing the portion of Panther Valley School District in Schuylkill County, Pennsylvania.

Panther Valley School District is a midsized, suburban public school district which is split across two counties in Pennsylvania. Panther Valley School District encompasses approximately 40 square miles (100 km^{2}). Panther Valley School District serves students who reside in boroughs of Coaldale in Schuylkill County, Lansford, Nesquehoning, and Summit Hill in Carbon County. According to 2000 federal census data, the district serves a resident population of 12,516. In 2009, the district residents’ per capita income was $16,533 while the median family income was $39,133. In the Commonwealth, the median family income was $49,501 and the United States median family income was $49,445, in 2010.

The district operates three schools: Panther Valley Junior Senior High School, Panther Valley Intermediate School and Panther Valley Elementary School.

Panther Valley High School, located on Route 209 in Summit Hill, opened in 1973. In 2007, the Panther Valley Middle School opened, housing grades 6, 7, and 8. In 2015, to relieve overcrowding in the Elementary School, grades 4 and 5 were moved to the Middle School, and grades 7 and 8 were moved to a new, two-story annex in the High School. The Middle School became "Panther Valley Intermediate School," and the High School became "Panther Valley Junior Senior High School."

== Extracurriculars ==
The district offers a wide variety of clubs, activities and after-school sports. Parties Ch

=== Athletics ===
Panther Valley is assigned to the Pennsylvania interscholastic Athletics Association (PIAA) District 11.

Panther Valley funds teams in the following high school sports:

- Football boys
- Volleyball Girls
- Basketball Boys and girls
- Baseball Boys
- Softball Girls
- Cheerleading Girls
- Wrestling Boys
- Track and field Boys and Girls

The district also funds the following middle school sports

- Basketball boys and girls
- Football boys
- Track and field boys and girls
- Wrestling boys
- According to PIAA directory July 2012
