= PVSD =

PVSD may refer to:

- Panther Valley School District in Carbon and Schuylkill Counties, Pennsylvania, USA
- Perkiomen Valley School District in Montgomery County, Pennsylvania, USA
- Pleasant Valley School District
  - Pleasant Valley School District (California)
  - Pleasant Valley School District (Pennsylvania)
- Pojoaque Valley School District
- Prairie Valley School Division in Regina, Saskatchewan, Canada
