= Summit Hill High School =

- U.S. National Register of Historic Places
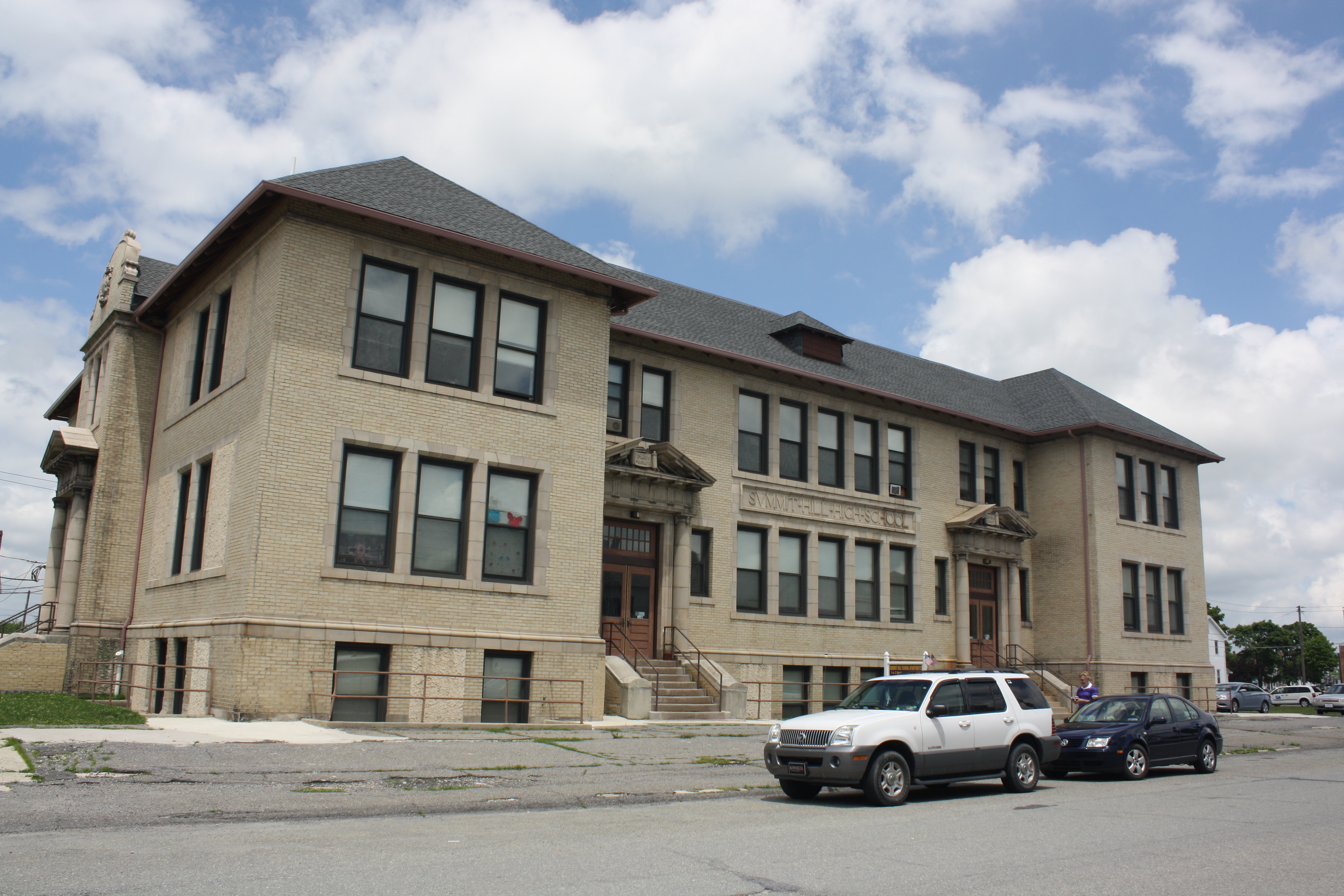
- Summit Hill High School. July 2013.

- Location within Pennsylvania Location within the United States
- Location: 128 W Hazard St, Summit Hill, Pennsylvania
- Coordinates: 40°49′34″N 75°52′29″W
- Area: 0.9 acres (0.36 ha)
- Built: 1911
- Architectural style: Renaissance
- NRHP reference No.: 01000138
- Added to NRHP: February 16, 2001

Summit Hill High School was an American high school that was located in Summit Hill, Pennsylvania in Carbon County, Pennsylvania in the commonwealth's Lehigh Valley region.

It was added to the National Register of Historic Places in 2001.

== History and architectural features ==
This school was built in 1911 and is a three-story, H-shaped, building that was designed in the Renaissance Revival style. It was made using structural terra cotta and faced with Roman brick. It measures approximately 122 feet wide and 82 feet deep. The school closed during the late 1960s and was renovated and converted into apartments in 1997.
