= Thomas F. Breslin =

American civil engineer (1885–1942)

- Thomas F. Breslin
- Born: July 6, 1885; Summit Hill, Pennsylvania
- Died: May 10, 1942 (aged 56); Bataan Peninsula, Philippines
- Military career
- Allegiance: United States
- Branch: United States Army
- Rank: "Colonel"
- Conflicts: World War II: Battle of the Philippines

Colonel Thomas F. Breslin (1885–1942) was a civil engineer and a civilian contractor for the United States Army. He was pinned as a Colonel at the outbreak of the Battle of the Philippines and died during the Bataan Death March, the brutal POW march in the aftermath of the Battle of Bataan.

== Birth and early life ==
Thomas Breslin was born in Summit Hill, Pennsylvania on July 6, 1885, the son of Francis Breslin and Mary Anne Malloy. He was baptized 6 days later at the Church of St. Joseph. Francis was a Justice of the Peace in Summit Hill. Francis' family had immigrated from Glenties County Donegal, Ireland in 1865. Mary was also born in Summit Hill. They were married at St. Anthony's Church in Greenpoint, Brooklyn, New York. Thomas was the oldest of six children and grew to be 5' 11".

== Education ==
He received dual degrees in Civil Engineering and Mining Engineering from Pennsylvania State College, now called Pennsylvania State University, graduating at the age of 22 in 1907.

With a Surveying Team in the white hat

== Work and marriage in Cebu ==
Thomas received a contract with the U.S. Government to survey large portions of the island of Cebu in the Philippines which was then under American rule following the Spanish–American War. While in Cebu, he married Maria Mata Laurel who was born in Danao on Cebu Island, the daughter of Candido Laurel and Gabina Mata. They had 11 children together. A street named "Brezlin Street" was named (with a phonetic spelling) after him in Cebu City, Cebu. He became multilingual during his time there.

According to a record held by his son, Robert Breslin, "The Island of Cebu bears his initials at each mountain peak" meaning that his initials are on the surveying benchmarks at each mountain peak on Cebu. Surveyor's initials are left on benchmarks so that if questions or disputes arise, the original surveyor can be consulted.

His stationery

== Luzon ==
They moved from Cebu to the island of Luzon in order for Thomas to work as a mining engineer and mine inspector in Baguio. At the outbreak of World War II, he was working as a civilian contractor for the US Army. He was in charge of constructing new barracks at Fort William McKinley, just south of Manila. According to his obitutary in a Summit Hill, Pennsylvania newspaper, "Mr. Breslin's fortunes and prominence grew until his name was notably linked with many business and governmental institutions in the Philippines. He established his home on Cebu, and Americans who visited him were impressed with the obvious success he had made of his prominence."

== The Bataan Death March ==
Although he was a leading civilian and was not in the military, he was pinned a Colonel when the Battle of the Philippines (1941–1942) started. According to a record held by his son Robert Breslin: "After his commanding general pinned Colonel's rank on his lapel, he made his goodbyes at home and by Christmas Day, 1941 was helping to position the defenses at Bataan." His language skills are thought to have been an important consideration in his pinning as most of the enlisted men in the United States Philippine Division were from the Philippines.

When the American forces there were overcome by the Japanese in the Battle of Bataan, the prisoners of war were made to march about 100 km as part of their journey to several concentration camps in the Bataan Death March. It was during this death march that, according to his son Robert's record, "Sick with dysentery and malaria, his comrades hid him in a culvert on the road to avoid the Japanese bayonets. A young Filipino man found him, took him to his home and hid him underground in his backyard, trying to nurse back his strength for about a month. With meager food amounts and no medicine, he succumbed to the diseases that plagued him." He died on May 10, 1942.

== His son's ordeal ==
His son, Richard "Dick" Breslin, was also on the death march but was much younger and stronger and so survived. Around April 3, 1942, Dick visited his father at the "Quartermaster Corps" before going to the front lines of the Battle of Bataan. This was the last time they would meet. After the surrender to the Japanese, Dick marched from Mariveles, Bataan to "Kilometer 69", and then was sent by cattle train to Camp O'Donnell in Tarlac. Because he was relatively healthy he was moved to "Camp #1" in Cabanatuan, and from there was on assignment, constructing the airport in Las Piñas from 1943 to 1944. He was near Corregidor when the Americans/Allies conducted the airstrike. Two days later, Dick was put in the coal bin of a hell ship and spent 38 days there before landing in Formosa. From Formosa they sailed the China Sea to Muji, Japan. From Muji he was sent by train to Tokyo and then to Odati for the winter 1944–1945 where he worked in an open pit lead mine until the war ended. He weighed about 87 lbs. at the end.

== His family ==
His family searched for him during the later, similar march of the prisoners from the Battle of Corregidor. They had no word of the fate of him or of his son until late in the war.

== Burial ==
After the American and Filipino army reoccupation of Luzon in 1945, a villager on the Bataan peninsula pointed out where his body had been buried to the soldiers. Only at this point did his family learn that he had died. Thomas' body was then exhumed and re-buried at Fort William McKinley, just south of Manila. His grave is maintained by the American Battle Monuments Commission.
