= Maria Zuber =

American geophysicist (born 1958)

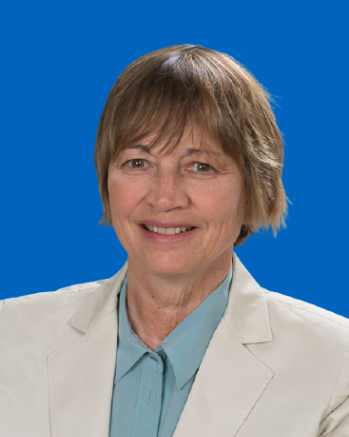

Former Co-chair of the President's Council of Advisors on Science and Technology
- Preceded by: Position established

Personal details
- Born: June 27, 1958 (age 67) Norristown, Pennsylvania, U.S.
- Education: University of Pennsylvania (BS); Brown University (MS, PhD)
- Awards: NASA Distinguished Public Service Medal
- Scientific career
- Fields: Planetary science
- Institutions: Massachusetts Institute of Technology
- Thesis: Unstable Deformation in Layered Media: Application to Planetary Lithospheres (1986)
- Doctoral advisor: E. M. Parmentier

Maria T. Zuber (born June 27, 1958) is the E. A. Griswold Professor of Geophysics and Presidential Advisor for Science and Technology Policy at the Massachusetts Institute of Technology. Zuber also serves as a trustee of Brown University. Zuber has been involved in more than half a dozen NASA planetary missions aimed at mapping the Moon, Mars, Mercury, and several asteroids. She was the principal investigator for the Gravity Recovery and Interior Laboratory (GRAIL) Mission, which was managed by NASA's Jet Propulsion Laboratory.

From 2021-2024, Zuber served as co-chair of President Joe Biden's Council of Advisors on Science and Technology (PCAST). She served on the National Science Board during the first Administration of President Donald Trump (2018-2021), and was the Board's chair during the Obama Administration (2016-2018).

== Early life and education ==
Maria T. Zuber was born on June 27, 1958, in Norristown, Pennsylvania. She grew up in Summit Hill, Pennsylvania, in Pennsylvania's Coal Region, one of five children of Joseph and Dolores (Stoffa) Zuber. She has three brothers, Joseph Jr., Stephen, and Andrew (1966–2018), and a sister, Joanne. Both her grandfathers were coal miners who contracted black lung disease.

Zuber was the first person in her family to attend college. She received her B.A. in astronomy and geology from the University of Pennsylvania in 1980. She earned Sc.M. and Ph.D. degrees in geophysics from Brown University, in 1983 and 1986 respectively, with advisor Marc Parmentier. Reflecting on her decision to apply to Ivy League graduate schools and not MIT, Zuber joked "I remember saying, I don't want to go to any nerd school... and of course, I'm the biggest nerd there is."

== Career ==
Zuber was a research scientist at the NASA Goddard Space Flight Center in Maryland, then became a professor of geophysics at Johns Hopkins University in 1991. She joined the faculty of Massachusetts Institute of Technology (MIT) in 1995 and was the head of the Department of Earth, Atmospheric and Planetary Sciences from 2003 to 2012. From 2012, she was vice president for research at MIT, where she also held the position of the E. A. Griswold Professor of Geophysics in the Department of Earth, Atmospheric and Planetary Sciences. She was the first woman to lead a science department at MIT and, as principal investigator of GRAIL, the first woman to lead a robotic planetary mission for NASA.

Zuber has made numerous theoretical and experimental contributions toward understanding the structure and tectonics of solid Solar System objects, including the Moon, Mars, and asteroids. In particular, she has pioneereed the use of gravity and laser altimetry in the measurement of the surface shapes of the inner planets, and the interpretation of these measurements in terms of internal structure and dynamics, thermal history, and surface-atmosphere interactions. Her theoretical work has included modeling lithospheric deformations and instabilities. She revised models of lunar structure and thermal history with data from Clementine, and made precise measurements of the Moon's crust with GRAIL. She made measurements of the crust of Mars with the Mars Global Surveyor, producing a theory of the planet's geodynamics. She contributed to the three-dimensional model of 433 Eros reconstructed from NEAR Shoemaker observations. Zuber has also been involved with the Mars Orbiter Laser Altimeter, MESSENGER, Mars Reconnaissance Orbiter, Dawn (spacecraft), the Lunar Reconnaissance Orbiter, and Psyche (spacecraft).

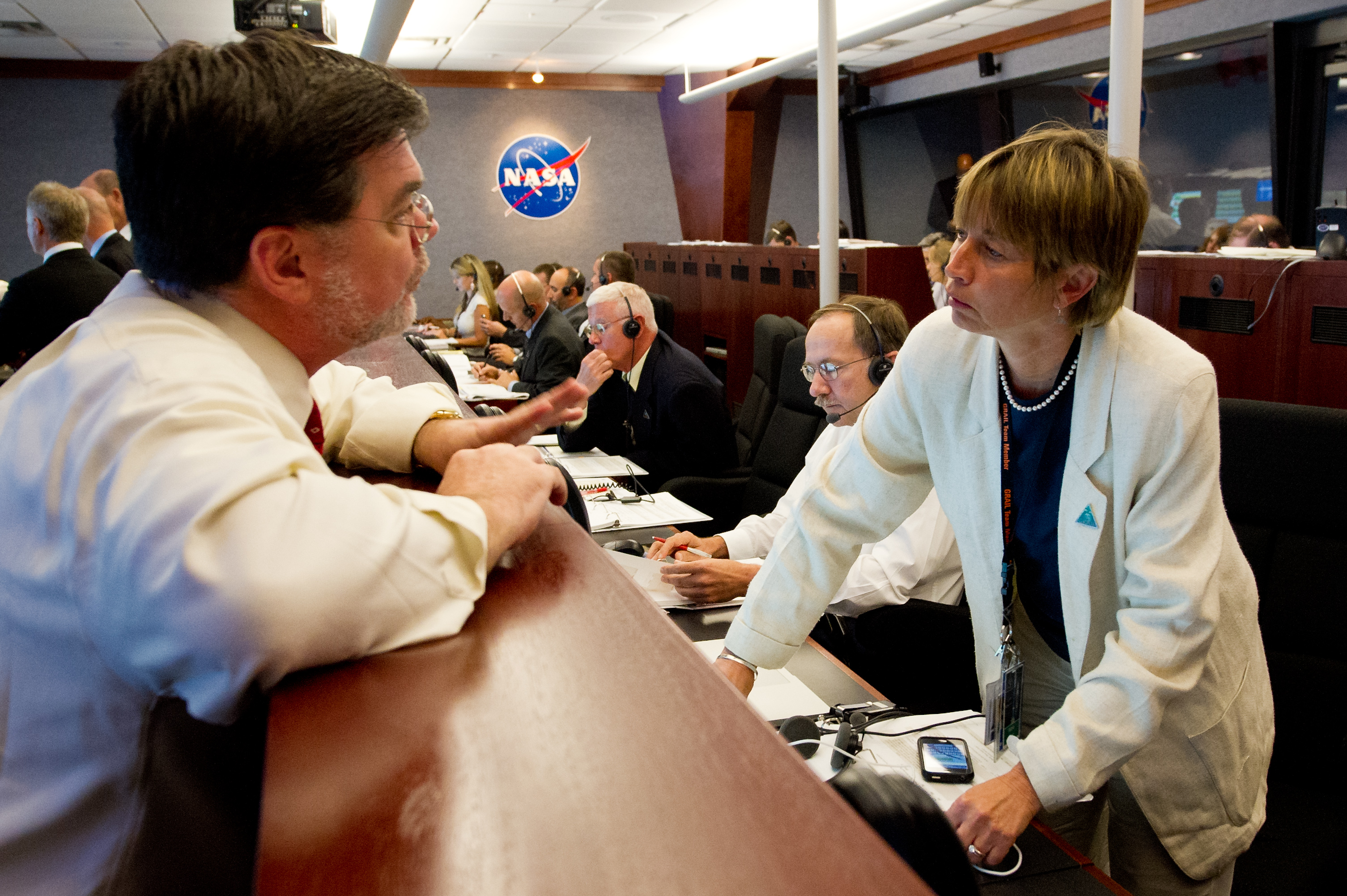
Jim Adams, NASA Deputy Director of Planetary Division, left, and Maria Zuber, GRAIL principal investigator, Massachusetts Institute of Technology, talk during the countdown to launch of the twin GRAIL spacecraft on Thursday, Sept. 8, 2011, at the Cape Canaveral Air Force Station in Cape Canaveral, Fla.

Zuber worked with Sally Ride to include in the GRAIL mission components that would capture the imagination of young students, inspired in part by a desire to spread her own childhood enthusiasm. A student contest provided the names for the mission's two spacecraft, Ebb and Flow, and students can sign up to use GRAIL's Moon Knowledge Acquired (MoonKAM) by Middle school students.

== Honors and awards ==
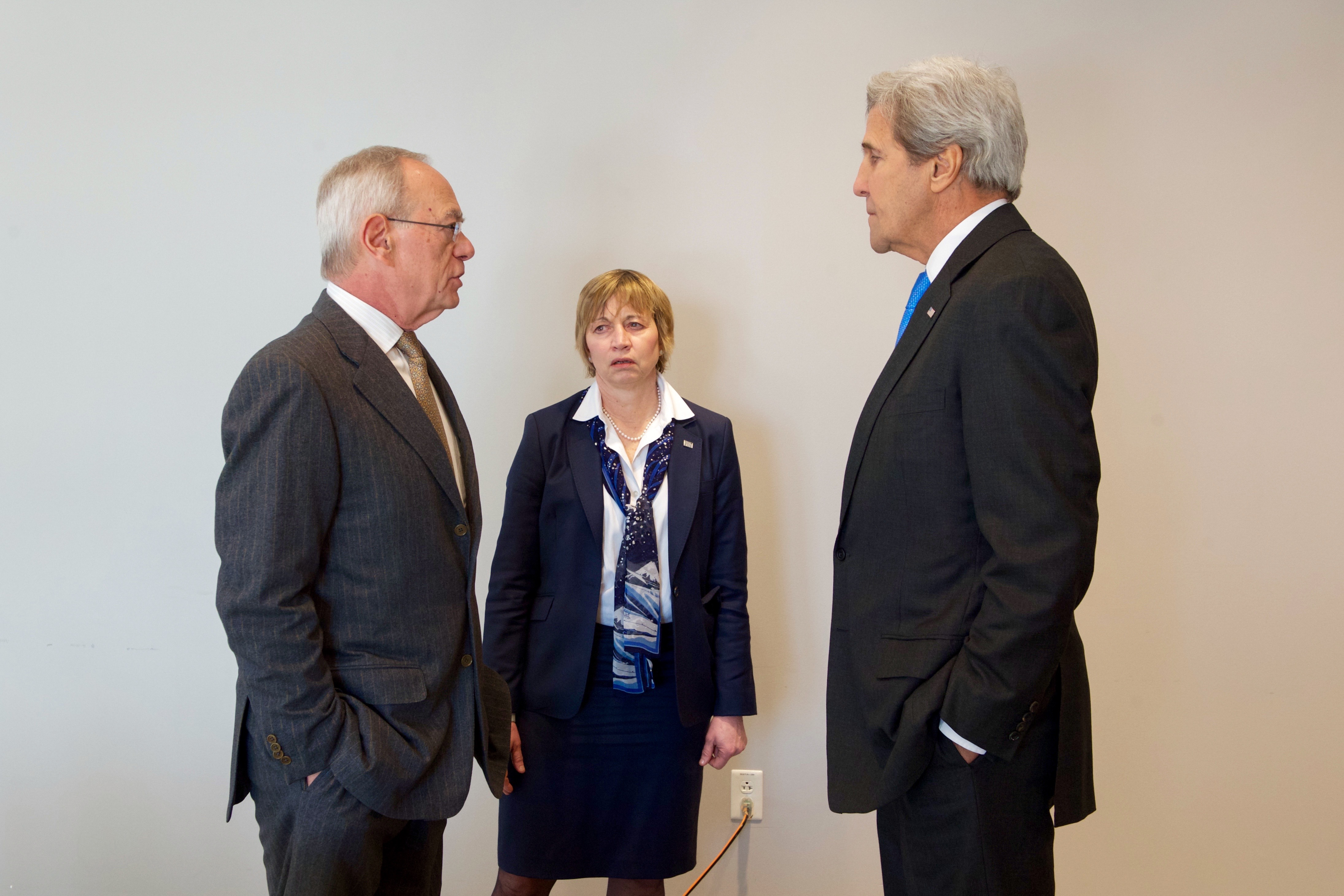
- Zuber with Leo Rafael Reif and John Kerry in 2017
  2002: 50 Most Important Women in Science (Discover Magazine).
- 2004: NASA Distinguished Public Service Medal.
- 2004: Elected to the National Academy of Sciences
- 2005: Elected to the American Philosophical Society
- 2007: American Astronautical Society/Planetary Society Carl Sagan Memorial Award.
- 2007: Geological Society of America G.K. Gilbert Award
- 2008: Honorary Doctor of Science degree from Brown University.
- 2008: Named as one of America's Best Leaders by U.S. News & World Report, with Fiona A. Harrison. Zuber and Harrison were the first two women to be selected as scientific leaders of NASA robotic missions.
- 2009: NASA Group Achievement Award for the Lunar Reconnaissance Orbiter Laser Ranging Team.
- 2010: NASA Group Achievement Award for the Lunar Reconnaissance Orbiter Team.
- 2012: Massachusetts Institute of Technology James R. Killian Jr. Faculty Achievement Award.
- 2012: NASA Group Achievement Awards for (1) the GRAIL Science Team; (2) the GRAIL Project Office Team; and (3) the GRAIL Mission Formulation Team.
- 2012: NASA Outstanding Public Leadership Medal
- 2012: Harry Hess Medal, American Geophysical Union.
- 2012: International Academy of Astronautics Laurel for Team Achievement to MESSENGER Team.
- 2013: National Space Society, Space Pioneer Award in Science and Engineering, GRAIL Team.
- 2013: NASA Exceptional Achievement for Science, Lunar Reconnaissance Orbiter Science Team.
- 2013: NASA Group Achievement Award for the Lunar Reconnaissance Orbiter - Laser Ranger Optical Communication Experiment.
- 2013: NASA Group Achievement Award for the Dawn Science Team.
- 2014: Buzz Aldrin Space Exploration Award, The Explorer's Club.
- 2015: Member, Johns Hopkins University Society of Scholars.
- 2015: MIT Freshman Advising Student Champion Award.
- 2015: Best Referee Award, Nature Publishing
- 2017: Eugene Shoemaker Distinguished Scientist Medal, NASA Solar System Exploration Virtual Science Institute
- 2019: Gerard P. Kuiper Prize in Planetary Sciences
- 2022: Golden Plate Award of the American Academy of Achievement presented by Awards Council member Dr. Francis Collins

Zuber is a fellow of the following professional societies:

- American Geophysical Union
- American Association for the Advancement of Science
- American Astronomical Society, Division for Planetary Sciences
- American Astronautical Society
- Geological Society of America

The asteroid 6635 Zuber, which orbits the sun between Mars and Jupiter, is named for Zuber.

== See also ==
- List of women in leadership positions on astronomical instrumentation projects
