= Lansford Historic District =

Historic district in Pennsylvania, United States

- U.S. National Register of Historic Places
- U.S. Historic district
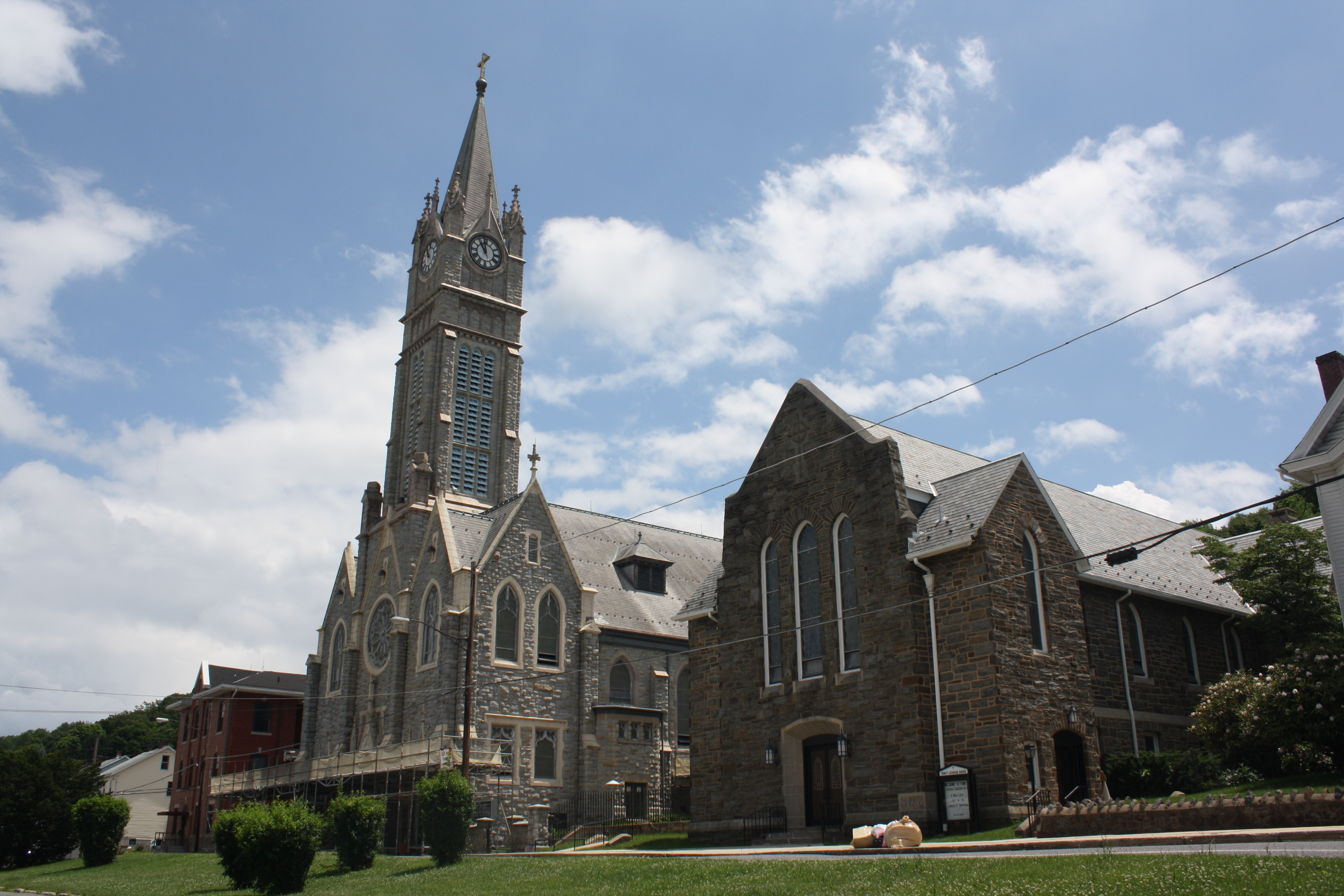
- Our Lady of the Angels Academy, St. Katharine Drexel, and Trinity Lutheran Church in Lansford Historic District. July 2013.

- Location within Pennsylvania Location within the United States
- Location: Roughly bounded by Snyder Avenue, Cortright, East, and Water Streets, Lansford, Pennsylvania
- Coordinates: 40°49′53″N 75°53′00″W
- Architectural style: Italianate, Queen Anne, Late 19th & 20th Century Revivals
- NRHP reference No.: 12000605
- Added to NRHP: September 4, 2012

The Lansford Historic District is a national historic district located at Lansford, Carbon County, Pennsylvania. It is part of the Lehigh Valley, which has a population of 861,899 and is the 68th most populated metropolitan area in the U.S. as of the 2020 census.

It was listed on the National Register of Historic Places in 2012.

== Gallery ==
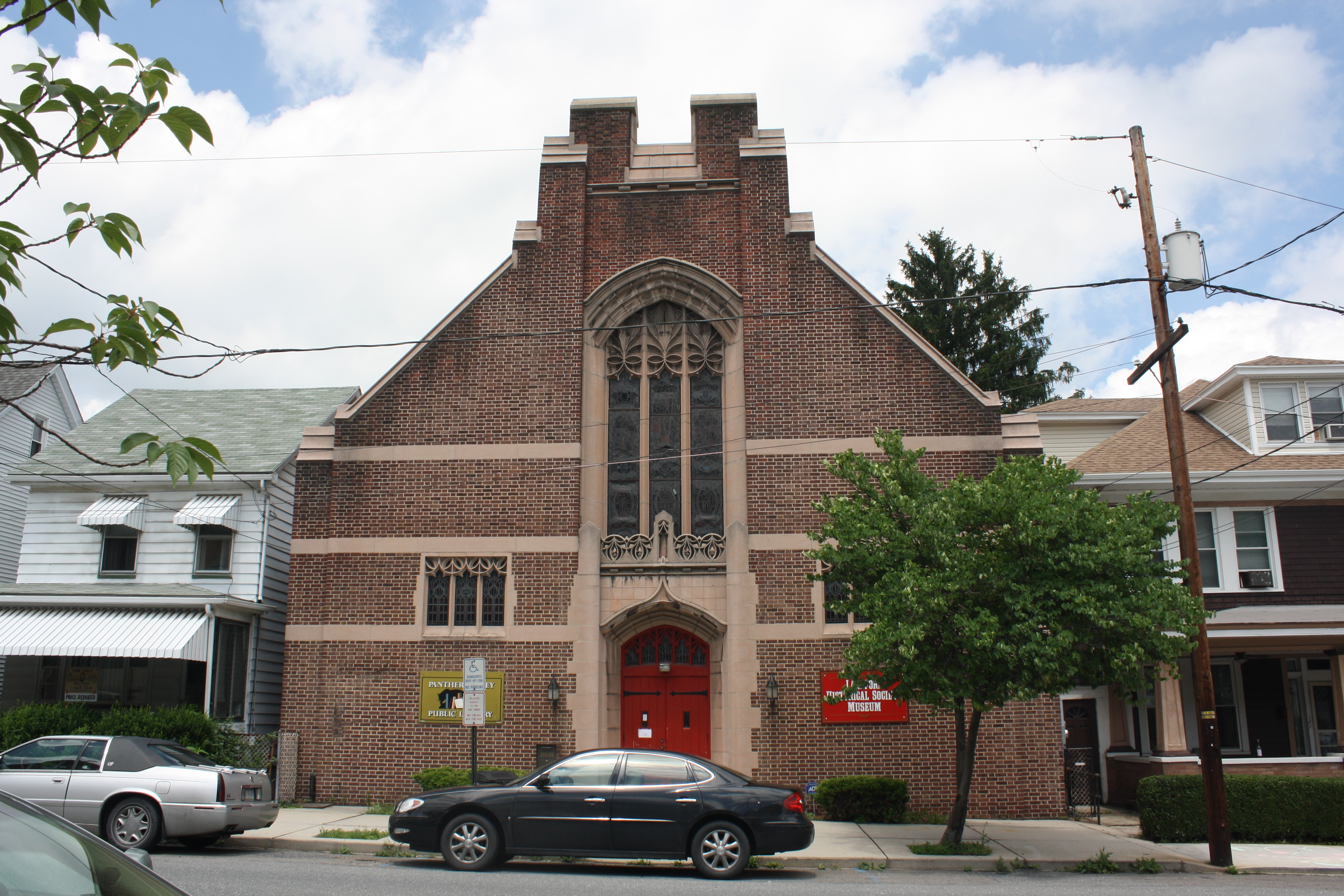
Panther Valley Public Library.

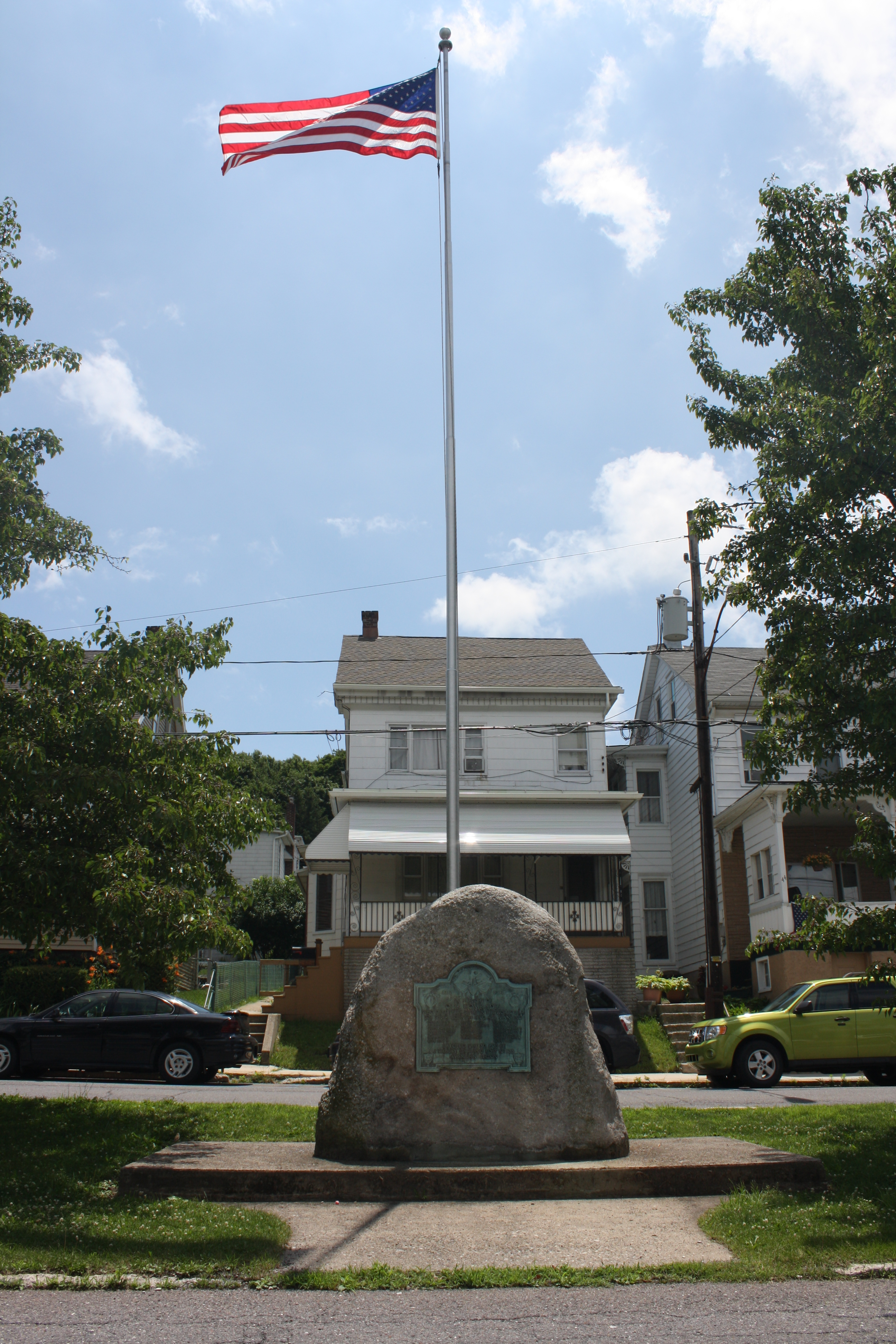
War memorial in Lansford.

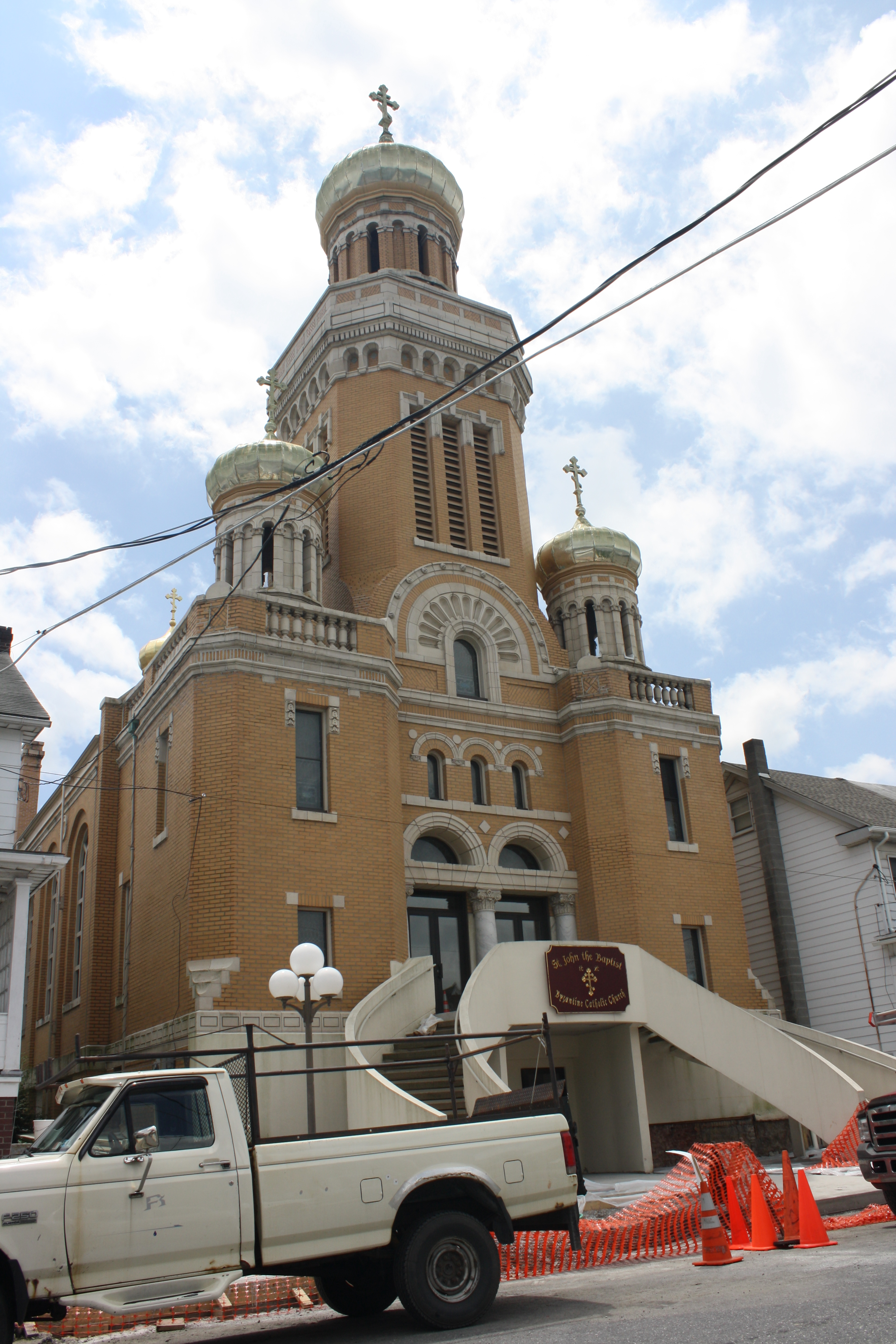
St. John the Baptist Byzantine Catholic Church.

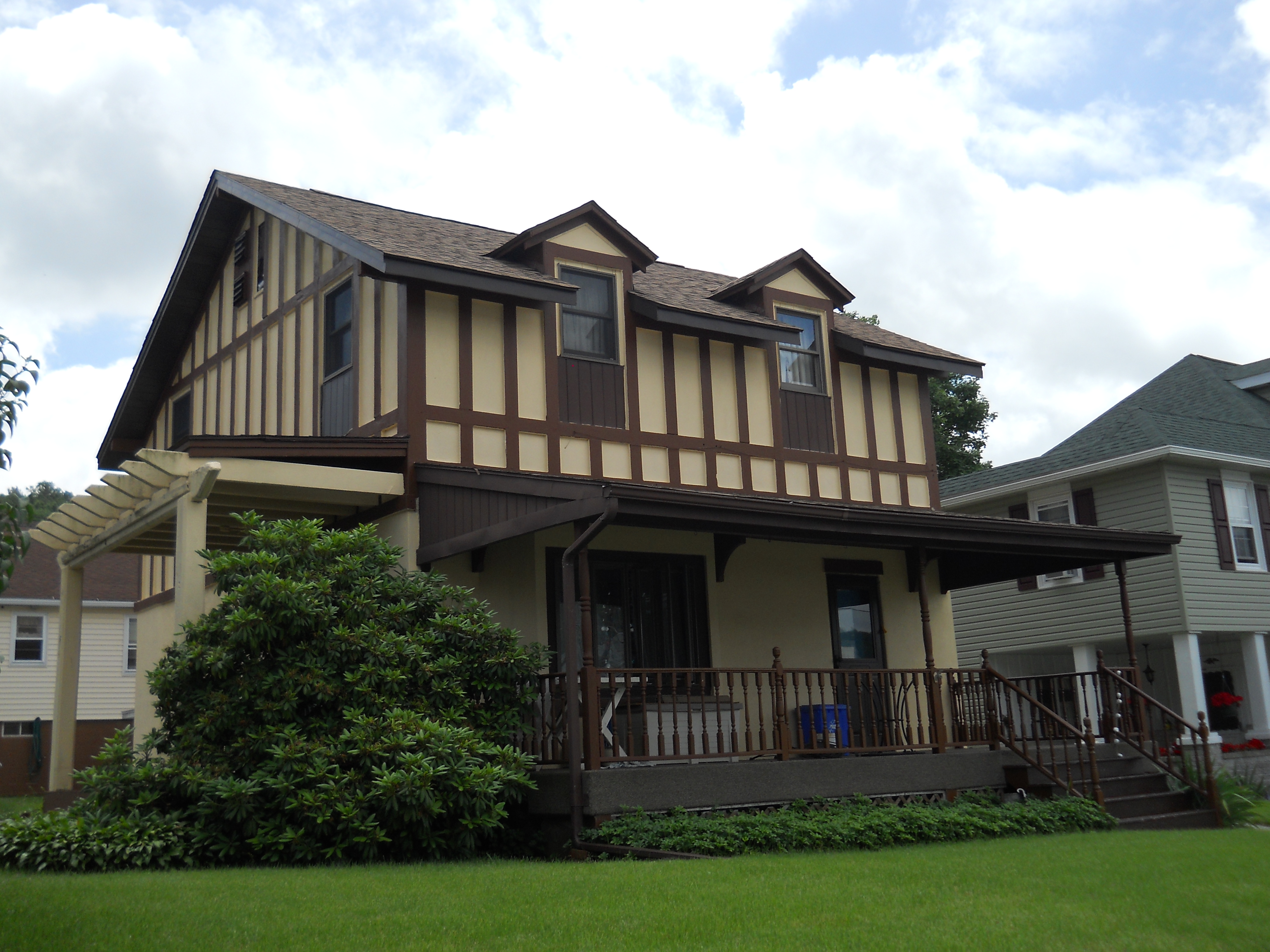
Residence on W. Bertsch Street

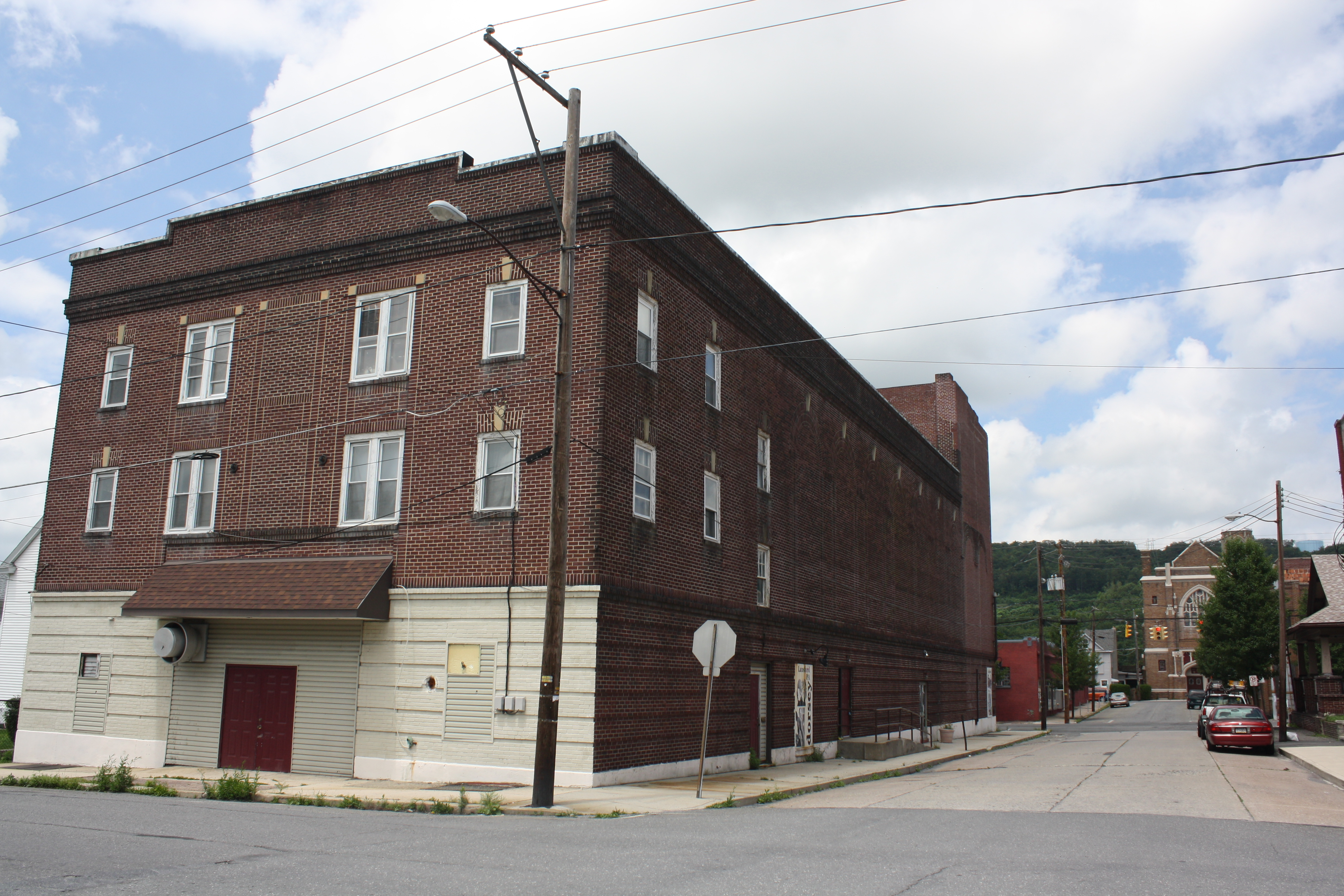
Corner of W. Bertsch & Cole Sts.
