= Mouchez (crater) =

Crater on the Moon

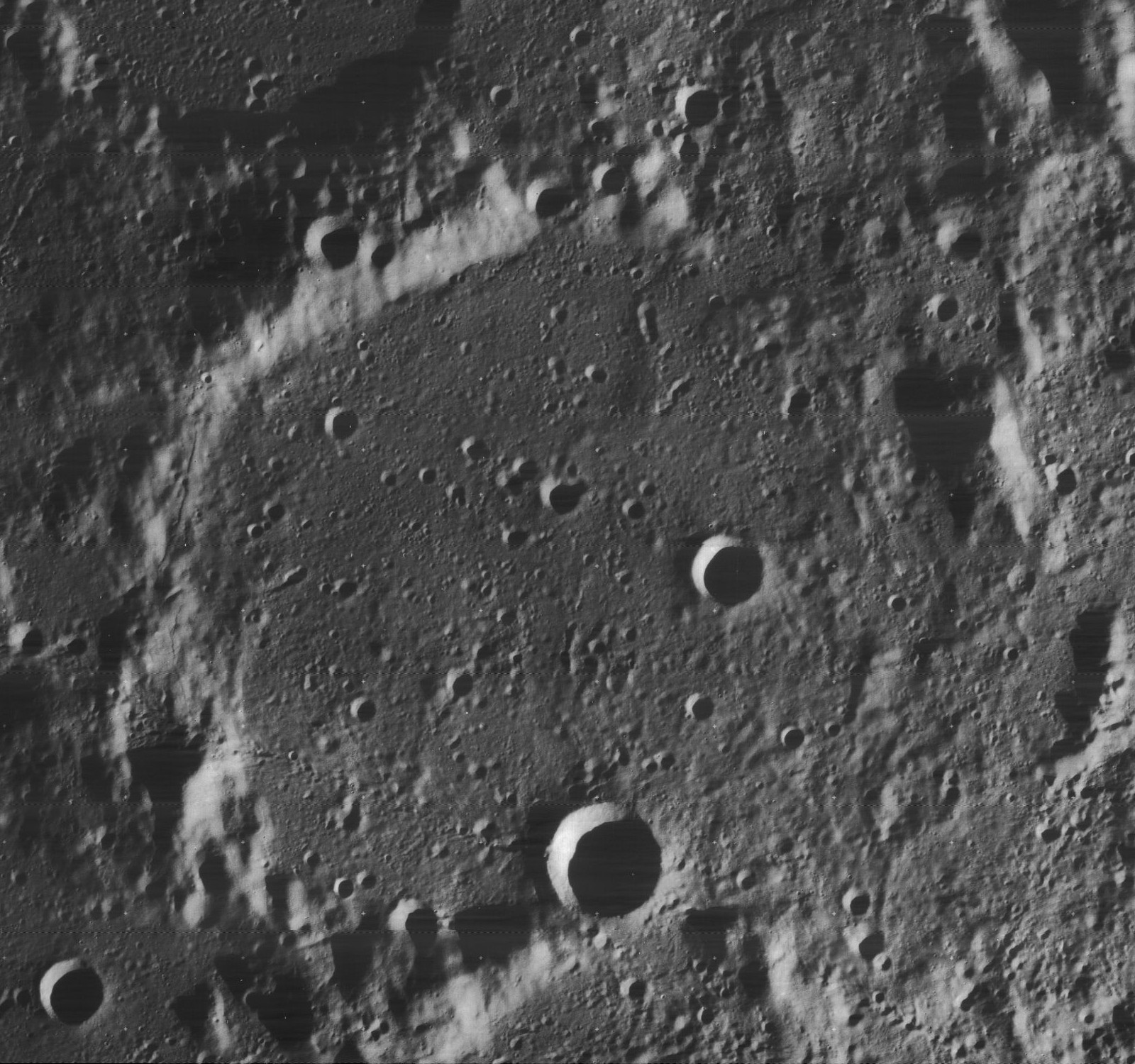
- Lunar Orbiter 4 image
- Coordinates: 78.3°N 26.6°W
- Diameter: 81 km
- Depth: Unknown
- Colongitude: 32° at sunrise
- Eponym: Ernest A. B. Mouchez

Mouchez is the remnant of a lunar impact crater that is located near the northern limb of the Moon, to the north of Philolaus and northwest of Anaxagoras.

Almost the entire eastern rim of this crater is missing, and the remaining arc is heavily worn and eroded. This surviving rim forms a curving arc that runs from the south clockwise to the north-northeast. Near the southern terminus is the small crater Mouchez C. The interior of the crater forms a level plain that is marked only by a number of tiny craters, and the small crater Mouchez B.

Attached to the exterior of the southern rim is a smaller replica of Mouchez, forming a curving ridge. Attached to the northern exterior is the flooded crater Mouchez A, which has a nearly intact rim with gaps along the northwestern side.

== Satellite craters ==
By convention these features are identified on lunar maps by placing the letter on the side of the crater midpoint that is closest to Mouchez.

Mouchez	Latitude	Longitude	Diameter
A	80.8° N	29.9° W	51 km
B	78.2° N	22.8° W	8 km
C	77.4° N	26.0° W	13 km
J	79.4° N	38.2° W	17 km
L	78.6° N	40.3° W	20 km
M	80.2° N	49.3° W	17 km
