= Summit Hill, Pennsylvania =

Borough in Pennsylvania, US

- Borough
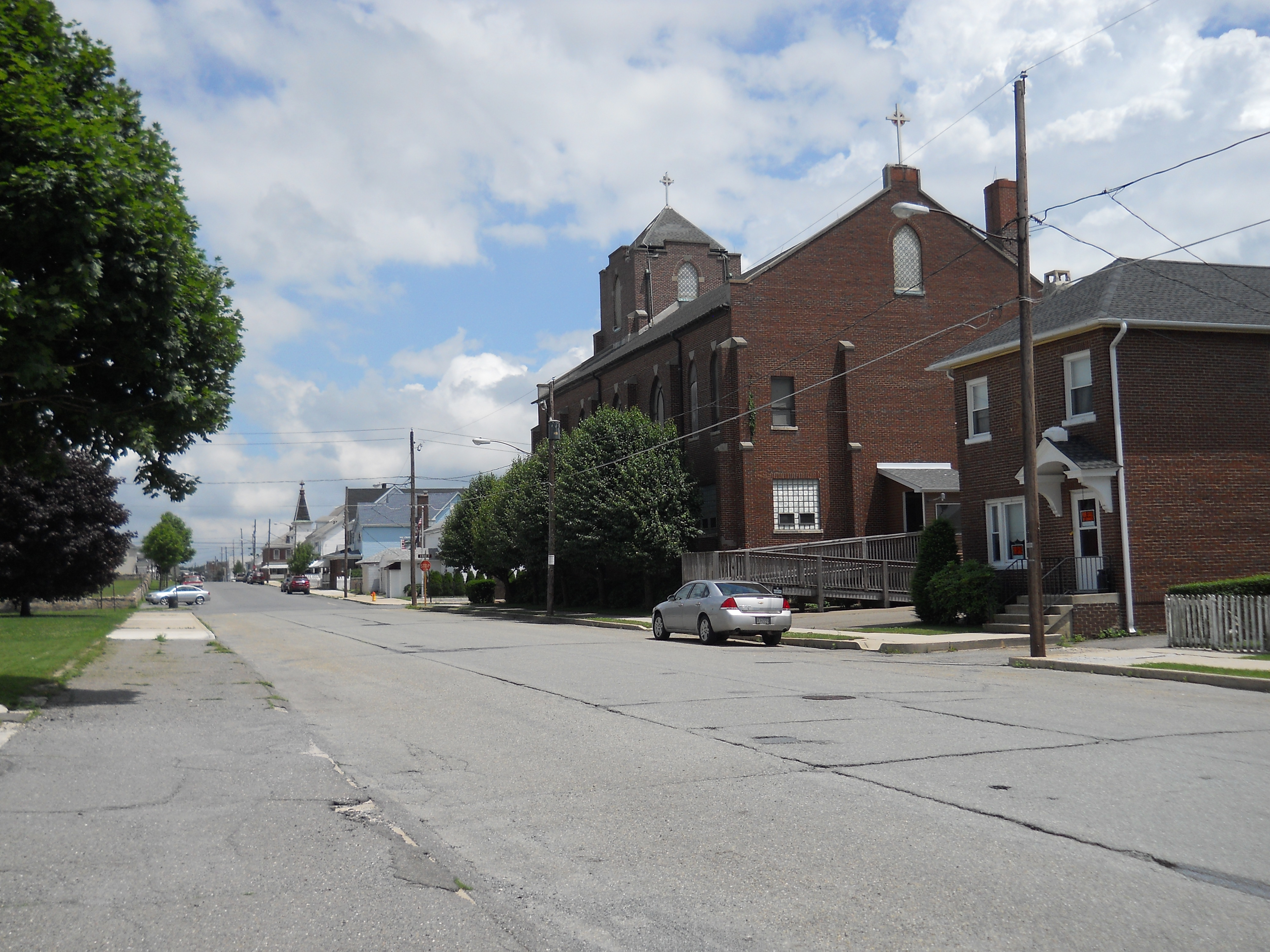
- Hazard Street in Summit Hill, July 2013

- Seal
- Motto: "Where it all began"
- Location in Carbon County, Pennsylvania

- Location in Pennsylvania Location in the United States
- Coordinates: 40°49′39″N 75°51′57″W
- Country: United States
- State: Pennsylvania
- County: Carbon

Government
  - Mayor: Jeff Szczecina

Area
  - Total: 9.10 sq mi (23.58 km^{2})
  - Land: 8.69 sq mi (22.51 km^{2})
  - Water: 0.41 sq mi (1.07 km^{2})
- Elevation: 1,510 ft (460 m)

Population (2010)
  - Total: 3,034
  - Estimate (2019): 2,954
  - Density: 339.9/sq mi (131.23/km^{2})
- Time zone: UTC-5 (EST)
  - Summer (DST): UTC-4 (EDT)
- ZIP Code: 18250
- Area codes: 570 and 272
- FIPS code: 42-75248
- Website: www.summithillborough.com

Summit Hill is a borough in Carbon County, Pennsylvania, United States. It is part of Northeastern Pennsylvania. As of the 2020 census, Summit Hill had a population of 3,120.

Summit Hill was the western terminus of the United States' second operational railway, the Mauch Chunk Switchback Railway. It was the site of some of the earliest coal mines developed in North America, where the Lehigh Coal & Navigation Company began mining in 1792, establishing the town initially as little more than a mining camp with stables and paddocks.

== History ==
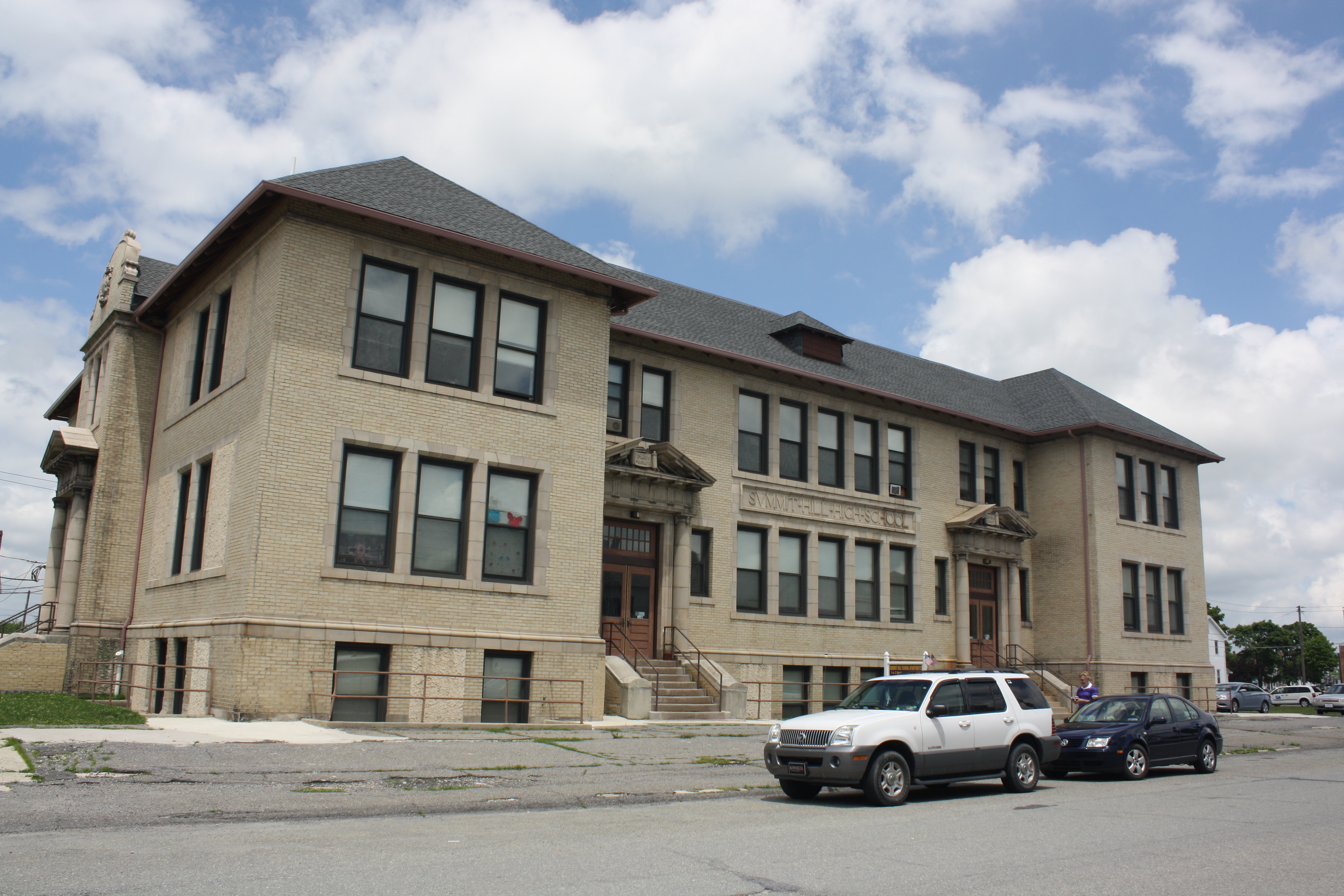
Summit Hill High School, July 2013

Anthracite coal was discovered on the ridgeline of Sharpe Mountain (now known as Pisgah Mountain) in 1791 by a hunter. News of the find led to the founding of the Lehigh Coal Mining Company, which in 1792 began exploring the area in earnest and buying up promising land. Coal was found in 1794 by Phillip Ginter along the northeast-to-southwest-running ridgeline of Pisgah Mountain lying several hundred feet below the ridge on the north slope in an area that became the boroughs of Summit Hill and Lansford.

Summit Hill High School was added to the National Register of Historic Places in 2001.

== Geography ==
Summit Hill is located in western Carbon County at 40°49′39″N 75°51′57″W (40.827420, -75.865892). The main development of the borough is on the crest of Pisgah Mountain, but the borough limits extend north to the ridgecrest of Nesquehoning Mountain, south to the far side of Mauch Chunk Mountain, and east to cover most of Mauch Chunk Lake. Also on the northern border is the borough of Lansford, while Tamaqua in Schuylkill County is on the western border.

According to the U.S. Census Bureau, Summit Hill borough has a total area of 9.1 square miles (23.6 km^{2}), of which 8.7 square miles (22.5 km^{2}) is land and 0.42 square miles (1.1 km^{2}), or 4.54%, is water. Summit Hill is located 6 miles (10 km) southwest of Jim Thorpe and 1 mile south of Lansford. Summit Hill's elevation varies from 1,520 feet (460 m) above sea level in the borough center to 1,620 feet (490 m) at the highest point on Pisgah Mountain to 1,010 feet (310 m) at Mauch Chunk Lake.

== Demographics ==
Historical population
| Census | Pop. | Note | %± |
|---|---|---|---|
| 1890 | 2,816 | | — |
| 1900 | 2,986 | | 6.0% |
| 1910 | 4,209 | | 41.0% |
| 1920 | 5,499 | | 30.6% |
| 1930 | 5,567 | | 1.2% |
| 1940 | 5,406 | | −2.9% |
| 1950 | 4,924 | | −8.9% |
| 1960 | 4,386 | | −10.9% |
| 1970 | 3,811 | | −13.1% |
| 1980 | 3,418 | | −10.3% |
| 1990 | 3,332 | | −2.5% |
| 2000 | 2,974 | | −10.7% |
| 2010 | 3,034 | | 2.0% |
| 2020 | 3,120 | | 2.8% |

=== 2020 census ===
As of the 2020 census, Summit Hill had a population of 3,120. The median age was 43.1 years. 22.0% of residents were under the age of 18 and 20.1% of residents were 65 years of age or older. For every 100 females there were 100.5 males, and for every 100 females age 18 and over there were 98.0 males age 18 and over.

79.6% of residents lived in urban areas, while 20.4% lived in rural areas.

There were 1,303 households in Summit Hill, of which 27.9% had children under the age of 18 living in them. Of all households, 41.3% were married-couple households, 21.3% were households with a male householder and no spouse or partner present, and 27.1% were households with a female householder and no spouse or partner present. About 30.8% of all households were made up of individuals and 14.0% had someone living alone who was 65 years of age or older.

There were 1,479 housing units, of which 11.9% were vacant. The homeowner vacancy rate was 2.5% and the rental vacancy rate was 8.3%.

Racial composition as of the 2020 census
| Race | Number | Percent |
|---|---|---|
| White | 2,880 | 92.3% |
| Black or African American | 31 | 1.0% |
| American Indian and Alaska Native | 8 | 0.3% |
| Asian | 10 | 0.3% |
| Native Hawaiian and Other Pacific Islander | 0 | 0.0% |
| Some other race | 55 | 1.8% |
| Two or more races | 136 | 4.4% |
| Hispanic or Latino (of any race) | 140 | 4.5% |

=== 2000 census ===
As of the 2000 census, there were 2,974 people, 1,291 households, and 844 families residing in the borough. The population density was 333.7 inhabitants per square mile (128.8/km^{2}). There were 1,451 housing units at an average density of 162.8 per square mile (62.9/km^{2}). The racial makeup of the borough was 98.99% White, 0.07% African American, 0.10% Native American, 0.17% Asian, 0.07% from other races, and 0.61% from two or more races. Hispanic or Latino of any race were 0.40% of the population.

There were 1,291 households, out of which 25.3% had children under the age of 18 living with them, 50.1% were married couples living together, 10.6% had a female householder with no husband present, and 34.6% were non-families. 31.4% of all households were made up of individuals, and 18.5% had someone living alone who was 65 years of age or older. The average household size was 2.30 and the average family size was 2.86.

In the borough the population was spread out, with 20.1% under the age of 18, 6.9% from 18 to 24, 27.6% from 25 to 44, 23.4% from 45 to 64, and 22.1% who were 65 years of age or older. The median age was 42 years. For every 100 females, there were 92.7 males. For every 100 females age 18 and over, there were 89.9 males.

The median income for a household in the borough was $37,287, and the median income for a family was $44,500. Males had a median income of $36,627 versus $23,507 for females. The per capita income for the borough was $21,166. About 4.0% of families and 7.5% of the population were below the poverty line, including 8.4% of those under age 18 and 6.2% of those age 65 or over.

Summit Hill is part of the Panther Valley School District, along with the neighboring towns of Lansford, Nesquehoning and Coaldale (Coaldale is located in Schuylkill County).

== Transportation ==
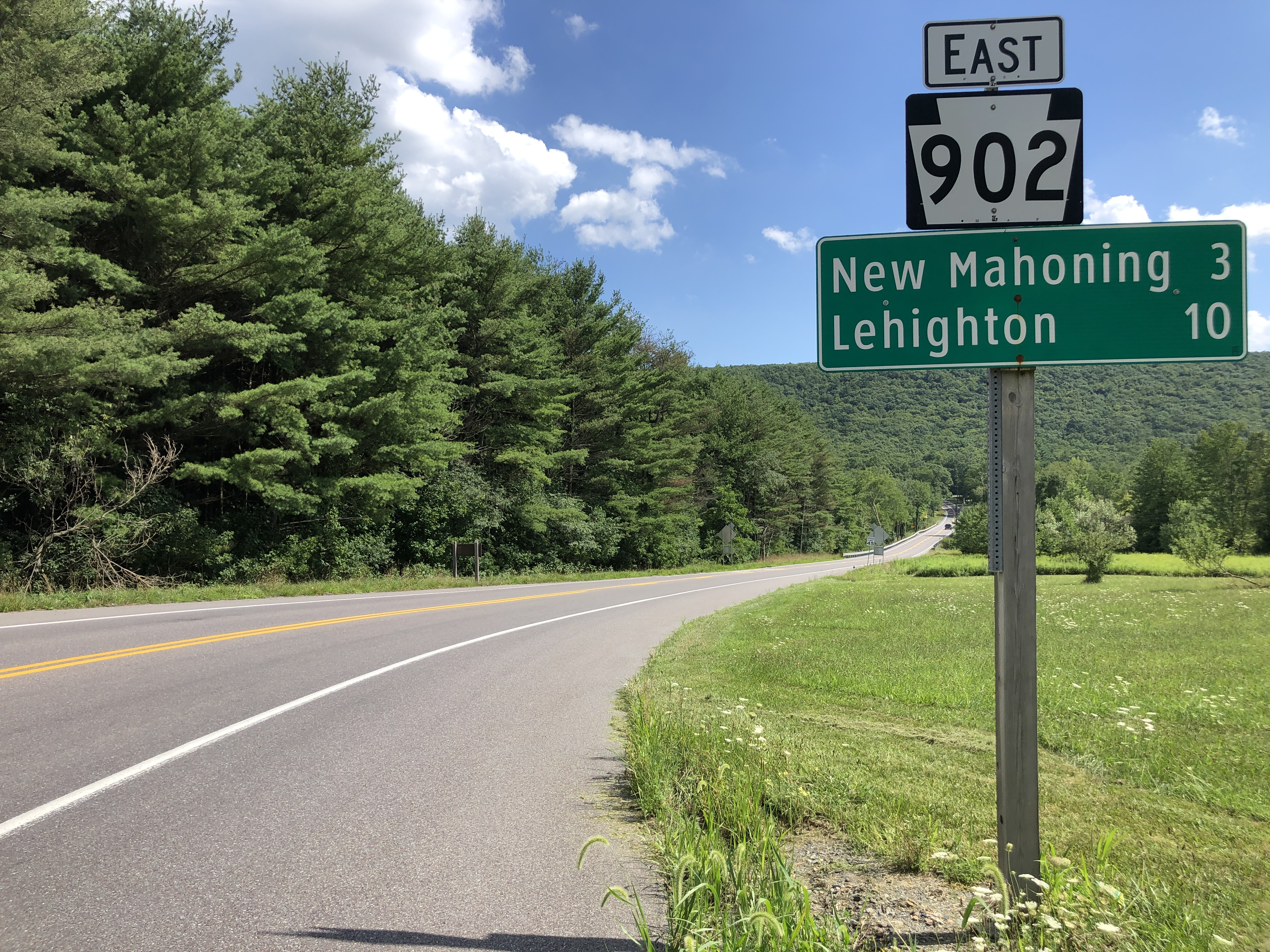
PA 902 eastbound in Summit Hill

As of 2008, there were 23.53 miles (37.87 km) of public roads in Summit Hill, of which 9.26 miles (14.90 km) were maintained by the Pennsylvania Department of Transportation (PennDOT) and 14.27 miles (22.97 km) were maintained by the borough.

Pennsylvania Route 902 is the only numbered highway serving Summit Hill. It follows North Street, Pine Street, Amidon Street and Laurel Drive along a northwest-southeast alignment through the middle of the borough.

== Notable people ==
- Thomas F. Breslin, Bataan Death March prisoner
- Francis James Furey, Archbishop of San Antonio
- Joe Gormley, MLB player
- Keith McCall, former Speaker of the Pennsylvania House of Representatives
- Samuel McLean, congressman
- Maria Zuber, planetary scientist
