= Lansford, Pennsylvania =

Borough in Pennsylvania, US

- Borough
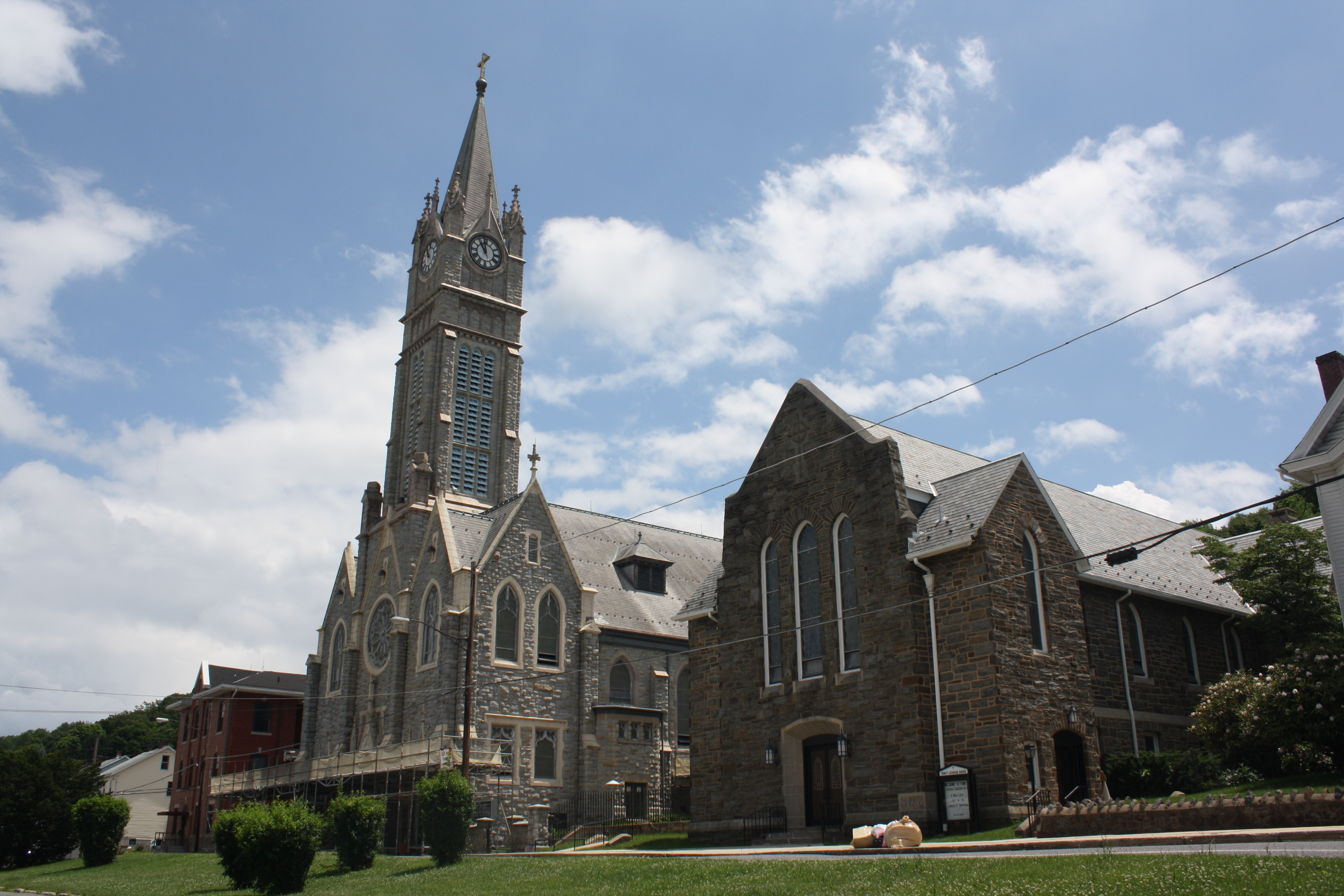
- St. Katharine Drexel Church in the Lansford Historic District in July 2013

- Location of Lansford in Carbon County, Pennsylvania

- Location of Lansford in Pennsylvania Location in the United States
- Coordinates: 40°49′53″N 75°53′0″W
- Country: United States
- State: Pennsylvania
- County: Carbon
- Borough (Pennsylvania): c. 1827 along with Coaldale, Pennsylvania

Area
  - Total: 1.54 sq mi (3.98 km^{2})
  - Land: 1.54 sq mi (3.98 km^{2})
  - Water: 0 sq mi (0.00 km^{2})
- Elevation: 1,145 ft (349 m)

Population (2020)
  - Total: 4,141
  - Density: 2,695.3/sq mi (1,040.68/km^{2})
- Time zone: UTC-5 (EST)
  - Summer (DST): UTC-4 (EDT)
- ZIP Code: 18232
- Area codes: 570
- FIPS code: 42-41464
- Website: www.boroughoflansford.com

Lansford is a county-border borough (town) in Carbon County, Pennsylvania, United States. It is part of Northeastern Pennsylvania. It is located 37 miles (60 km) northwest of Allentown and 19 miles south of Hazleton in the Panther Creek Valley about 72 miles (116 km) from Philadelphia and abutting the cross-county sister-city of Coaldale in Schuylkill County.

The whole valley was owned and subdivided into separate lots by the historically important Lehigh Coal & Navigation Company, locally called the Old Company, which likely settled some structures on the lands by 1827. (Note: Geographically, Coaldale and Lansford are joined at the hip, geologically and geographically the same terrain. Coaldale was settled in 1827, when John Moser and his wife settled there.)

Lansford grew with the development of local anthracite coal mines and was named after Asa Lansford Foster, who was an advocate for merging the small patch towns that developed in the area surrounding the anthracite coal mines.

As of the 2020 census, Lansford had a population of 4,141. This was a steep decline from a high of 9,632 at the 1930 census, a pattern common to many mining towns in Northeastern Pennsylvania.

== History ==
The area where Lansford currently sits was originally the home of the "Wolf Tribe" of the Lenape people.

Lansford's first school was opened in 1847 on Abbott Street. Lansford's first church, the Welsh Congregational, was built in 1850 and still stands today on West Abbott Street.

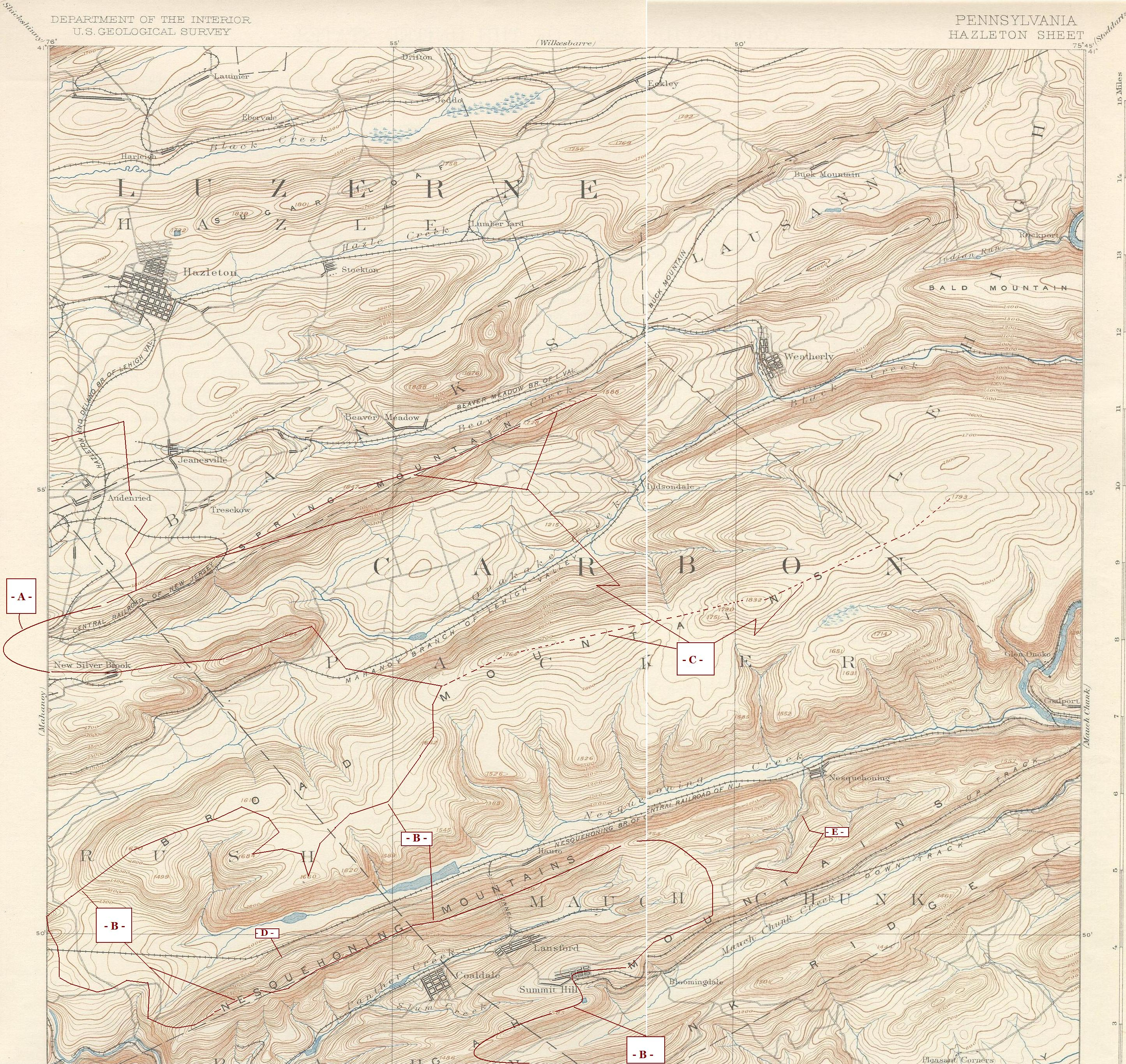
1893 USGS map centered on the three parallel ridges that run SW-to-NE but pinch down and converge into a steep valley along the Lehigh Valley

The old No. 9 Mine and Museum in Lansford, a deep mine which operated from 1855 to 1972, is now open as a tourist attraction offering tours of the mine and a wealth of information on local mining history. A museum occupying the mine's former Wash Shanty building on the site displays a large collection of mining artifacts.

One of the local mine bosses, John P. Jones, was murdered in Lansford, reportedly in connection with labor union strife, attributed to members of a secret society known as the Molly Maguires, many of whom were put on trial and hanged in Carbon and Schuylkill Counties during the mid- to late 1870s.

Lansford was the home of the first Commercial Cable Television system in the United States.

The Lansford Historic District was added to the National Register of Historic Places in 2012.

== Geography ==
According to the U.S. Census Bureau, the borough has a total area of 1.6 square miles (4.1 km^{2}), all of it land. The town shares the border of Carbon and Schuylkill County with the abutting neighboring community of Coaldale, which is de facto, a suburban bedroom neighborhood. Lansford is 1 mile north of Summit Hill (where the first anthracite deposits mined by the Lehigh Coal Company were discovered in the 1780s); 10 miles west of Lehighton, and 6 miles northeast of Tamaqua. Lansford's elevation is 1145 feet above sea level. It is also 36 miles northwest of Allentown and 9 miles south of Hazleton. It is located on the northwestern fringe of the Lehigh Valley and is at the southern end of the Coal Region and the Pocono Mountains.

Lansford sits on the north slope of Pisgah Mountain above and along the south bank of the Panther Creek tributary of the Little Schuylkill River, athwart US-209 west of Jim Thorpe, Nesquehoning, and the eastern extent of the Lehigh-Schuylkill drainage divide, down slope and below historic Summit Hill and east of abutting Coaldale and Tamaqua, Pennsylvania, both farther downstream and west. Nesquehoning Mountain dominates the north bank across the Panther Creek and the rich coal mines of the valley shipped coal through the 3,800 feet (1,158.2 m) long Hauto Tunnel of the Central Railroad of New Jersey (CNJ) competing for the rich trade with New York City and Philadelphia.

Hugh Vrablic is the Mayor of Lansford and is assisted by a council. The town also has a fire department and a police force.

Lansford is part of the Panther Valley School District and is the home of their newly remodeled football stadium and walking track.

== Transportation ==
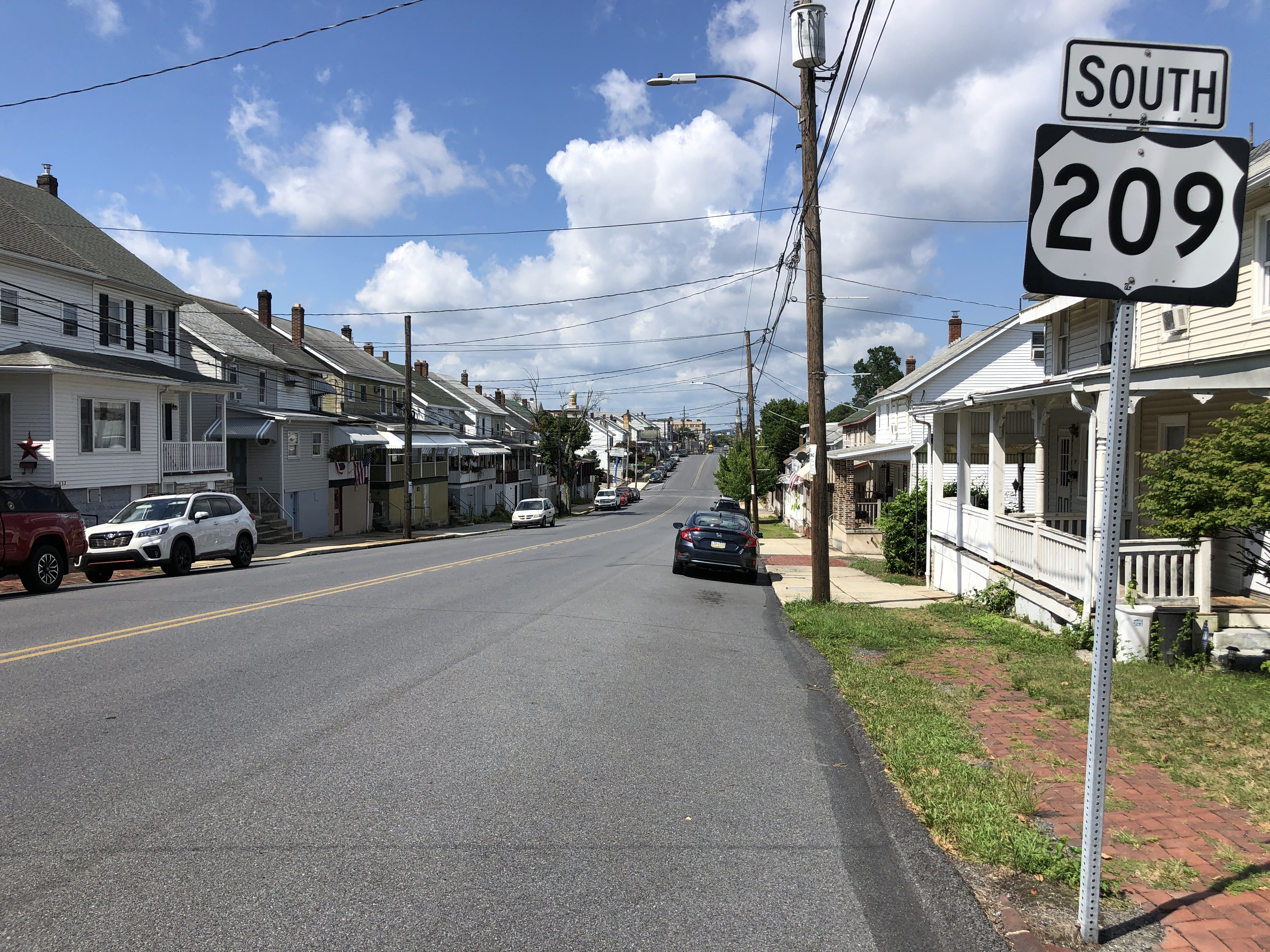
US 209 southbound in Lansford

As of 2007, there were 15.45 miles (24.86 km) of public roads in Lansford, of which 2.15 miles (3.46 km) were maintained by the Pennsylvania Department of Transportation (PennDOT) and 13.30 miles (21.40 km) were maintained by the borough.

U.S. Route 209 is the main highway serving Lansford. It follows Patterson Street along a southwest-northeast alignment through the center of town. Pennsylvania Route 902 begins at US 209 and heads southeastward along Spring Garden Street.

== Demographics ==
Historical population
Census	Pop.	Note	%±
1880	2,206		—
1890	4,004		81.5%
1900	4,888		22.1%
1910	8,321		70.2%
1920	9,625		15.7%
1930	9,632		0.1%
1940	8,710		−9.6%
1950	7,486		−14.1%
1960	5,958		−20.4%
1970	5,168		−13.3%
1980	4,466		−13.6%
1990	4,583		2.6%
2000	4,230		−7.7%
2010	3,941		−6.8%
2020	4,141		5.1%

=== 2020 census ===
As of the 2020 census, Lansford had a population of 4,141. The median age was 38.2 years. 24.1% of residents were under the age of 18 and 15.0% of residents were 65 years of age or older. For every 100 females there were 96.0 males, and for every 100 females age 18 and over there were 93.4 males age 18 and over.

97.5% of residents lived in urban areas, while 2.5% lived in rural areas.

There were 1,729 households in Lansford, of which 28.4% had children under the age of 18 living in them. Of all households, 28.8% were married-couple households, 25.3% were households with a male householder and no spouse or partner present, and 33.1% were households with a female householder and no spouse or partner present. About 36.6% of all households were made up of individuals and 15.1% had someone living alone who was 65 years of age or older.

There were 2,161 housing units, of which 20.0% were vacant. The homeowner vacancy rate was 5.1% and the rental vacancy rate was 11.3%.

Racial composition as of the 2020 census
Race	Number	Percent
White	3,414	82.4%
Black or African American	184	4.4%
American Indian and Alaska Native	26	0.6%
Asian	16	0.4%
Native Hawaiian and Other Pacific Islander	1	0.0%
Some other race	184	4.4%
Two or more races	316	7.6%
Hispanic or Latino (of any race)	445	10.7%

=== 2000 census ===
As of the 2000 census, there were 4,230 people, 1,878 households, and 1,098 families residing in the borough. The population density was 2,710.0 inhabitants per square mile (1,046.3/km^{2}). There were 2,228 housing units at an average density of 1,427.4 per square mile (551.1/km^{2}). The racial makeup of the borough was 98.18% White, 0.35% African American, 0.07% Native American, 0.31% Asian, 0.07% Pacific Islander, 0.28% from other races, and 0.73% from two or more races. Hispanic or Latino people of any race were 1.42% of the population.

There were 1,878 households, out of which 24.6% had children under the age of 18 living with them, 38.4% were married couples living together, 14.9% had a female householder with no husband present, and 41.5% were non-families. 37.7% of all households were made up of individuals, and 23.4% had someone living alone who was 65 years of age or older. The average household size was 2.23 and the average family size was 2.92.

In the borough the population was spread out, with 22.5% under the age of 18, 7.3% from 18 to 24, 25.6% from 25 to 44, 19.1% from 45 to 64, and 25.5% who were 65 years of age or older. The median age was 41 years. For every 100 females, there were 84.1 males. For every 100 females age 18 and over, there were 80.2 males.

The median income for a household in the borough was $27,478, and the median income for a family was $37,773. Males had a median income of $30,405 versus $22,255 for females. The per capita income for the borough was $14,347. About 10.9% of families and 14.3% of the population were below the poverty line, including 20.5% of those under age 18 and 10.4% of those age 65 or over.

== Media ==
WLSH is a locally owned 5,000-watt station at 1410 on the AM dial which signed-on December 24, 1952. The call letters stand for Lansford and neighboring Summit Hill.

== Notable people ==
- Benjamin Bloom (1913–99), American educational theorist and professor of education
- Richard Marcinko (November 21, 1940 – December 25, 2021) was a U.S. Navy SEAL commander, Vietnam War veteran, and convicted fraudster. He was the first commanding officer of SEAL Team Six
