= Henry Augustus Sims =

American architect (1832–1875)

Henry Augustus Sims (1832–1875) was an American architect from Philadelphia.

== Biography ==
Sims was born in Philadelphia, Pennsylvania on December 22, 1832, the second son of John Clarke Sims and his wife, Emeline Marion Clark. He was educated at Philadelphia's Central High School where he studied civil engineering. In 1851, he moved to Canada to work for the Bytown and Prescott Railway during the initial construction of the railroad, which was completed in 1854. In 1856, he changed his profession to architecture. By 1858, he had established a successful architectural business in Ottawa, Canada. He returned to Philadelphia in 1866 and continued to have a successful architectural business. He was joined by his younger brother, James Peacock Sims, and together they established the H. A. & J. P. Sims firm, which flourished until the elder Sims' death.

An auction catalogue of Sims' valuable collection of architectural books survives.

Sims mentored architects T. Roney Williamson and James Peacock Sims. He was a member of the American Institute of Architects, the Philadelphia chapter of the AIA, and the Philadelphia Sketch Club.

He died in Philadelphia, Pennsylvania on July 10, 1875.

== Selected works ==
=== United States ===
- Township Hall, (1858), Augusta Township, Northampton County, Pennsylvania.
- St. John's Chapel (1865–66), Washington & Franklin Streets, Cape May, New Jersey. Now known as Episcopal Church of the Advent.
- First Presbyterian Church in Philadelphia (1868–72), 21st & Walnut Streets, Philadelphia, Pennsylvania.
- Washington County Court House (1872), Hagerstown, Maryland.
- Second Girard Avenue Bridge (1873–74, demolished 1969), Fairmount Park, Philadelphia, Pennsylvania, Thomas C. Clark, engineer.
- Masonic Hall, (1875), Reading, Pennsylvania.
- Chapel, Mercersburg, Pennsylvania.
- Montgomery County Almshouse, Norristown, Pennsylvania.

=== Canada ===
- Edwardsburgh Township Hall, (1858), Spencerville, Ont;
- Cemetery Monument for Rev. Robert Blakey, (1860), Prescott, Ont
- Monument for G.E. Aird, (1864) Ottawa, Ont.
- Cottage for Brandish Billings Sr., (1864), Ottawa, Ont
- Skating Arena & Curling Rink (major addition), (1864), Ottawa, Ont
- Cottage at Ashburnham Hill for Charles King, (1864), Ottawa, Ont
- Commercial buildings for Mr. Prodrick, Sussex Street (1865) Ottawa, Ont.
- Anglican Church, (1865-1867), Iroquois, Ont.
- Residence at New Edinburgh for Robert Blackburn, (1867), Ottawa, Ont
- Anglican Church for Rev. E.W. Beaven, (1868), Edwardsburgh, Ont
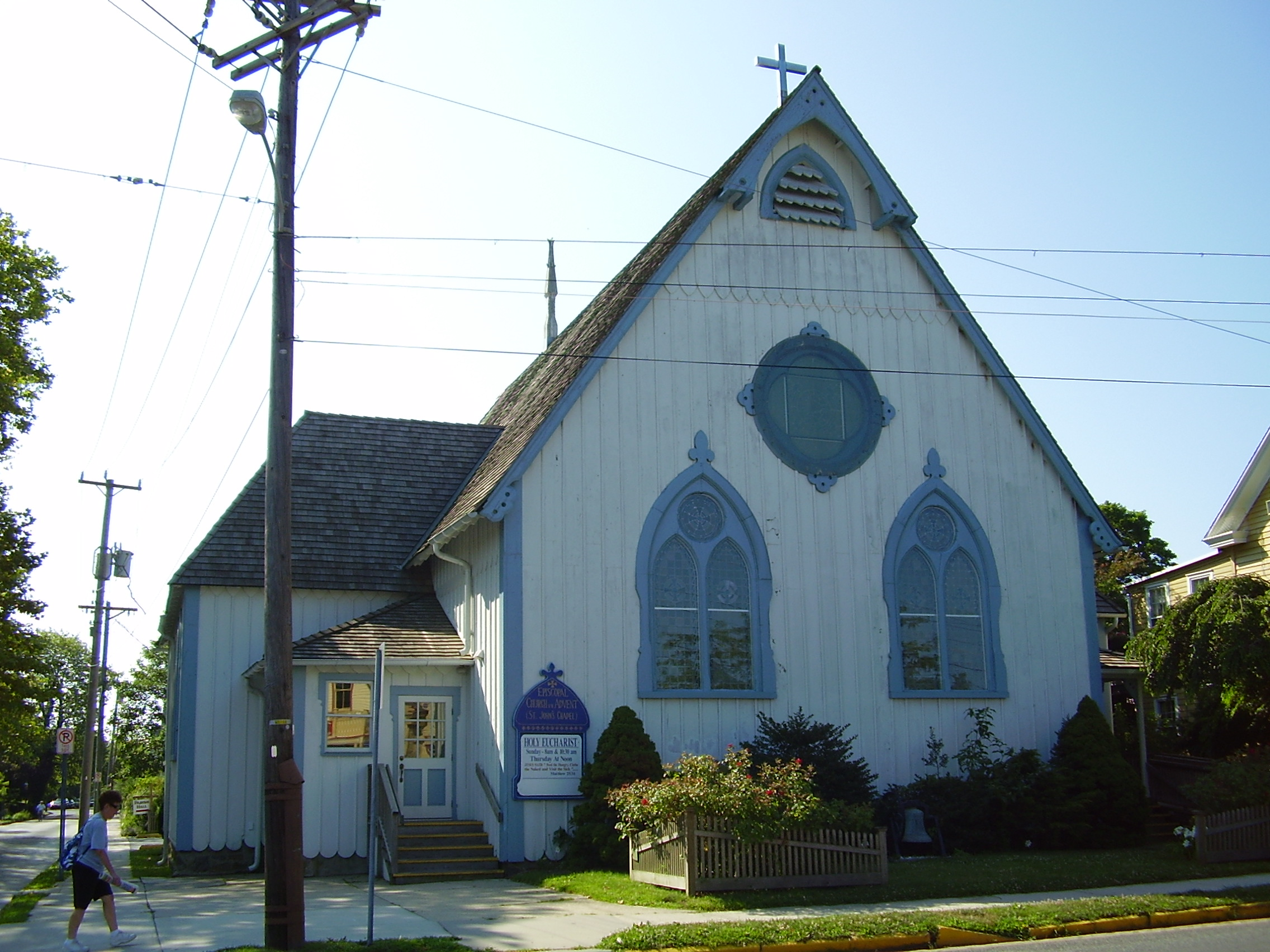
Church of the Advent (1865–66), Cape May, New Jersey.

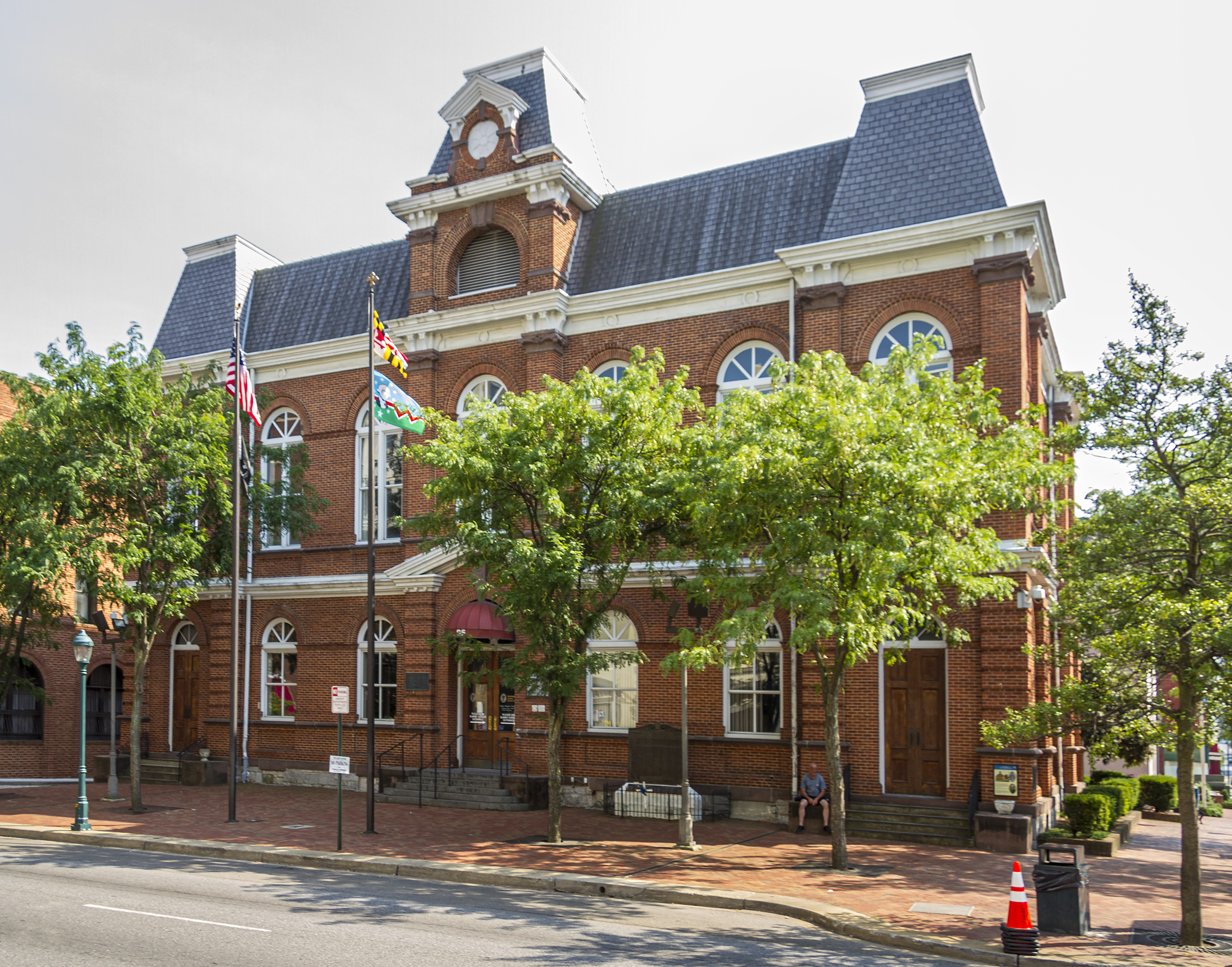
Washington County Court House (1872), Hagerstown, Maryland.

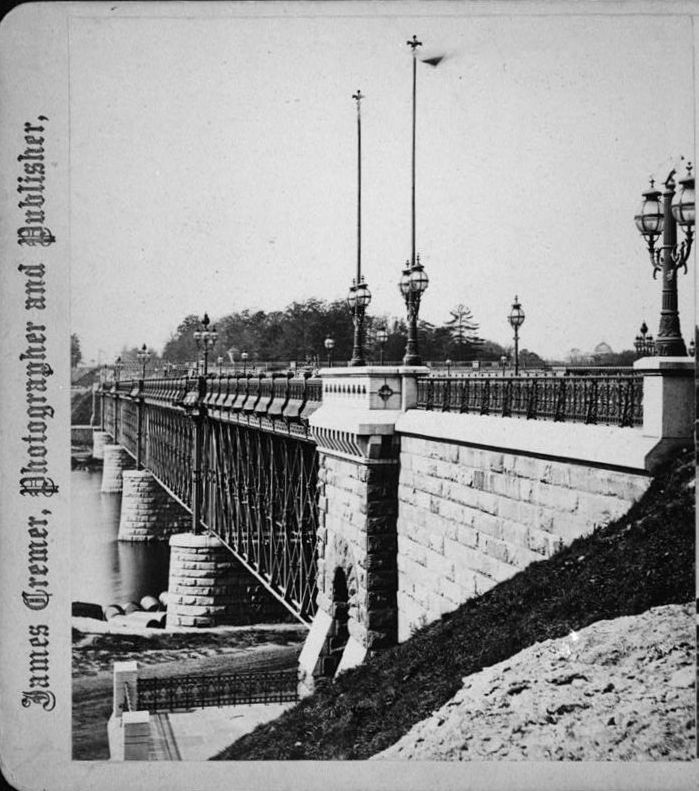
Second Girard Avenue Bridge (1873–74, demolished 1969), Philadelphia, Pennsylvania.
