= John Wilbank =

19th century American bell caster

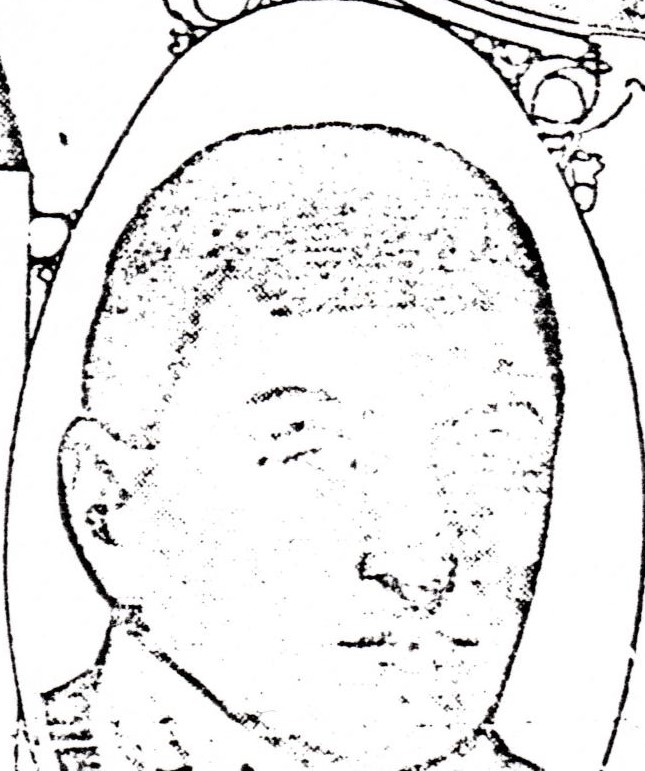
- Born: 1788
- Died: February 2, 1843 (aged 54–55)
- Occupation: Brass Founder/Bell Caster
- Known for: Casting the first replacement bell for Independence Hall

John Wilbank (1788–1843) was a 19th-century American bell caster from Philadelphia, Pennsylvania. He was appointed by the city of Philadelphia in 1828 to cast the bell to replace the old damaged bell for Independence Hall, now known as the Liberty Bell.

== Settlement in Philadelphia ==
John Wilbank was an emigrant from Germany, among many other Germans whom settled in the state of Pennsylvania in the first half of the 19th century. He was a member of the Old St. George's Church of Philadelphia starting in 1801. He was recorded first in 1813 as a bell caster in the city directory.

== Bells Cast ==
Among Wilbank's first castings was a clock-mounted bell from 1810 for a design by clockmaker John Fessler of Frederick, Maryland.

Later works included the bell cast for the clock tower in West Chester, Pennsylvania, that of the Chester County Courthouse in 1836.

== Contract with the City ==
Wilbank was contracted by the city of Philadelphia to cast a new bell for the State House, known today as Independence Hall, for its newly erected bell tower in 1828. The new bell was placed in the tower on September 11, 1828. It was cast in recognition of Lafayette's visit to the city in 1824. John Wilbank's terms of their contract stated that he would remove the old bell in exchange for its scrap value of $400, deducted from the total cost of the new bell he cast, valued at $1800. Wilbank ultimately refused to remove the old bell to his foundry which was located in Germantown, Pennsylvania at that time due to financial constraints and his recognition of the historical value of the bell. He is quoted as saying "I cannot destroy the bell" "your children and my children will some day value it, so I let it stand".

== Dispute with the City Council ==
John Wilbank was subsequently sued by the city council of Philadelphia for his breach of contract in refusal to remove the bell from the State House. However, an agreement was reached in which Wilbank would donate the bell to the city instead of being moved and likely melted down. Wilbank's bell was later moved to a bell tower in Germantown.

== Later Disputes ==
A number of Wilbank's descendants have claimed ownership of the Liberty Bell, including his granddaughter Caroline Wilbank, former wife of Judge Advocate General of the U.S. Navy, Samuel Diehl, in 1915. One dispute can be summarized in a letter to the editor from the Philadelphia Times Public Ledger in June 1903: "The new bell which now hangs in the steeple of Germantown Hall, was cast by John Wilbank, took the place of the old bell in the new steeple on Sept. 11, 1828" "Our unappreciative Councils of 1828 would not pay Mr. Wilbank his bill until he deducted $400 for the old bell, which thus became his property..." Charles W. Alexander Philadelphia. June 26, 1903. Caroline Wilbank and her sisters disputed ownership over the Liberty Bell in 1915 amidst its travels for large events such as the Panama-Pacific International Exposition of 1915, where it had traveled across the country on tour. This was done out of fear of the bell being damaged and the descendants' feelings of their duty to protect it. One of the sisters is quoted as saying "We have no desire," "as many seem to think, to remove the Liberty Bell from its old resting place in Independence Hall. We are too patriotic for that. But we wish to restrain it from being taken out of the city, as it might meet with some accident on its journey". Another one of the sisters proclaimed "I and my three sisters claim ownership of the Liberty Bell as heirs of John Wilbank. He had a foundry in Shoemaker Street...and cast the bell which took the place of the Liberty Bell. It now hangs in the steeple of the town hall in Germantown and the name John Wilbank can be read in full upon it. The sum of $11,800 was appropriated to pay for this bell, but when accounts came to be settled up, my grandfather was obliged to take the old bell in part payment. Thus the Liberty Bell became his personal property and has descended to us as his heirs." "My grandfather might have melted the old relic of the Revolution down for door bells, dinner bells or any other kind of tinkler, but he stood his loss with lofty patriotism". Later in 1915, an agreement was reached between the heirs of John Wilbank and the city of Philadelphia stating that as long as the Liberty Bell remained hanging in Independence Hall, it would remain "on loan".

== Abolition Sentiments ==
As the Liberty Bell had later been known as a symbol for the abolition of slavery, John Wilbank became an active advocate for this cause. In 1836 he ran an advertisement in the Philadelphia Inquirer that stated "I will deduct 10 dollars from the price of every bell that weighs four hundred pounds and upwards, that is to be used for an alarm Bell in case of an insurrection of the negroes and I will charge 30 dollars advance on every bell of the above weights, knowing it is to be used for the purpose of calling an Abolition Society together. From the above the public may know my sentiments...
