= Jedediah Andrews =

Jedediah Andrews (1674–1747) the first Presbyterian minister in Pennsylvania. Andrews was born in Hingham, Massachusetts, and graduated from Harvard University in 1695. He was ordained and installed as the pastor of the First Presbyterian Church in 1701, the year in which Philadelphia received its charter as a city. He served at this church for nearly fifty years. During the Old Side–New Side controversy controversy of 1744, resulting in a division over Biblical scripture and manners of preaching within the church, Andrews remained with the Old Side. Upon the arrival of Samuel Hemphill in 1734, Andrews invited him to serve as an assistant minister at the church, but being a firm Old side minister, he soon discovered that the young Reverend Hemphill had different interpretations of scripture than he, which ultimately created much controversy within the Presbyterian Synod.

== Sources ==
- "Andrews, Jedediah". McClintock and Strong Biblical Cyclopedia.
- Christensen, Merton A. (July 1953). "Franklin on the Hemphill Trial: Deism Versus Presbyterian Orthodoxy". The William and Mary Quarterly. 10 (3): 422–440. doi:10.2307/1917483. JSTOR 1917483.
- Sprague, William Buell (1858). Annals of the American Pulpit 1869. Vol. III. New York: Amos Press.
- Webster, Richard (1858). A history of the Presbyterian church in America : from its origin until the year 1760. Philadelphia: Joseph M. Wilson.
- White, William P. (June 1914). "Presbyterian Churches of Philadelphia: Their Organization and Changes of Location and Name". Journal of the Presbyterian Historical Society (1901–1930). 7 (6): 257–273. JSTOR 23323373.
