= Dimmick Memorial Library =

Historic library in Jim Thorpe, Pennsylvania

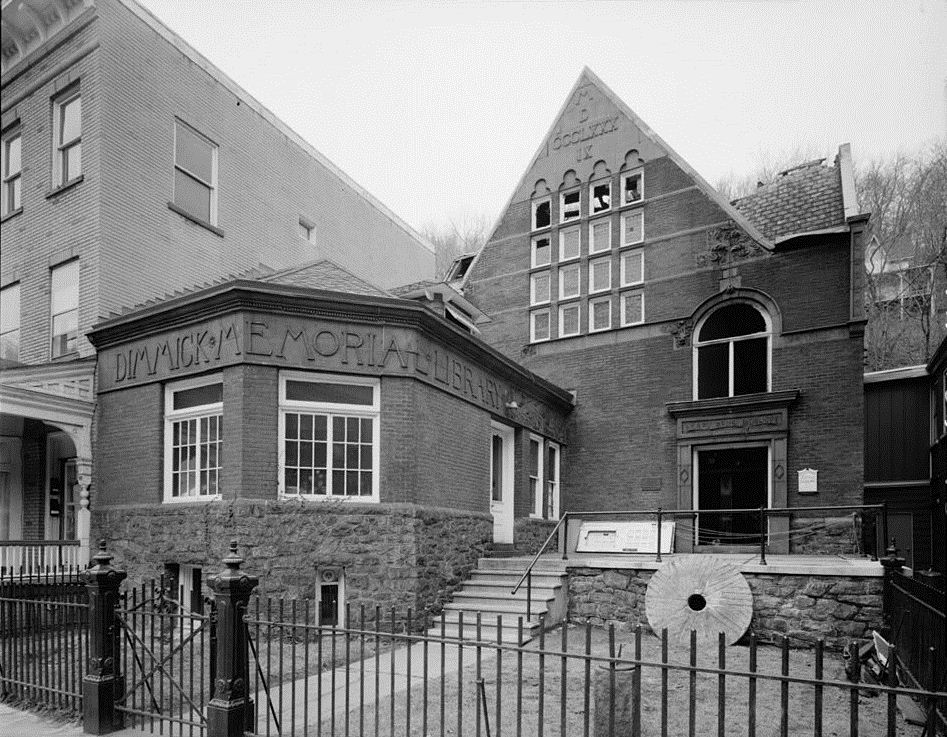
- Dimmick Memorial Library after the December 13, 1979 fire.
- 40°51′50″N 75°44′22″W
- Location: United States
- Established: 1890
- Architect(s): T. Roney Williamson

Other information
- Website: www.dimmicklibrary.org

The Dimmick Memorial Library is a public library in the Old Mauch Chunk Historic District of Jim Thorpe, Pennsylvania, in the United States.

The library was established on October 1, 1890, with the financial support of Milton Dimmick, a civil engineer and son of prominent attorney Milo Dimmick who had settled in the community. The library was nearly destroyed by fire on December 13, 1979. It was later rebuilt by the local government, with the assistance of fundraising from people all over the world. Once it was rebuilt, there was an extended room built onto the back of the old Victorian rotunda area, which is presently a children's room. Today it is still in use and updated, and many of the local historical documents which were saved in the safe room can still be viewed with permission. Along with this, the local bird collection of the old children's room, the old newspapers which were put on microfilm and later being put to data file, and the stone and metal sundial that was in the courtyard were also saved. The library can still be found on the list of local historic registries of Old Mauch Chunk, which is the present-day town of Jim Thorpe.
