= John Blair Linn =

American clergyman and poet

John Blair Linn (March 14, 1777 – August 30, 1804) was an American clergyman and poet.

John Blair Linn was born in Shippensburg, Pennsylvania, on March 14, 1777. William Linn, his father, was an academic administrator.

Linn graduated from Columbia College in 1793. He published in magazines and newspapers while at college.

After college, Linn studied law in the office of Alexander Hamilton, a friend of his father's, but did not take to it. After abandoning the law, he studied theology with Dirck Romeyn at Union College, receiving an MA in 1797. He was ordained a Presbyterian clergyman in 1798 and became assistant pastor of the First Presbyterian Church in Philadelphia on June 13, 1799.

Shortly after his graduation from college, Linn wrote a play titled Bourville Castle, or the Gallic Maidens. The play premiered at John Street Theatre on January 16, 1797, but was not successful. He published five books of poetry and three prose works.

Linn died of tuberculosis in Philadelphia on August 30, 1804, at the age of 27.

== Sources ==
- Leary, Lewis (1975). Soundings : some early American writers. University of Georgia Press. ISBN 0-8203-0350-X. OCLC 1659338.
