= Episcopal Church of the Advent / St. John's Chapel =

Historic church in New Jersey, United States

- U.S. Historic district – Contributing property
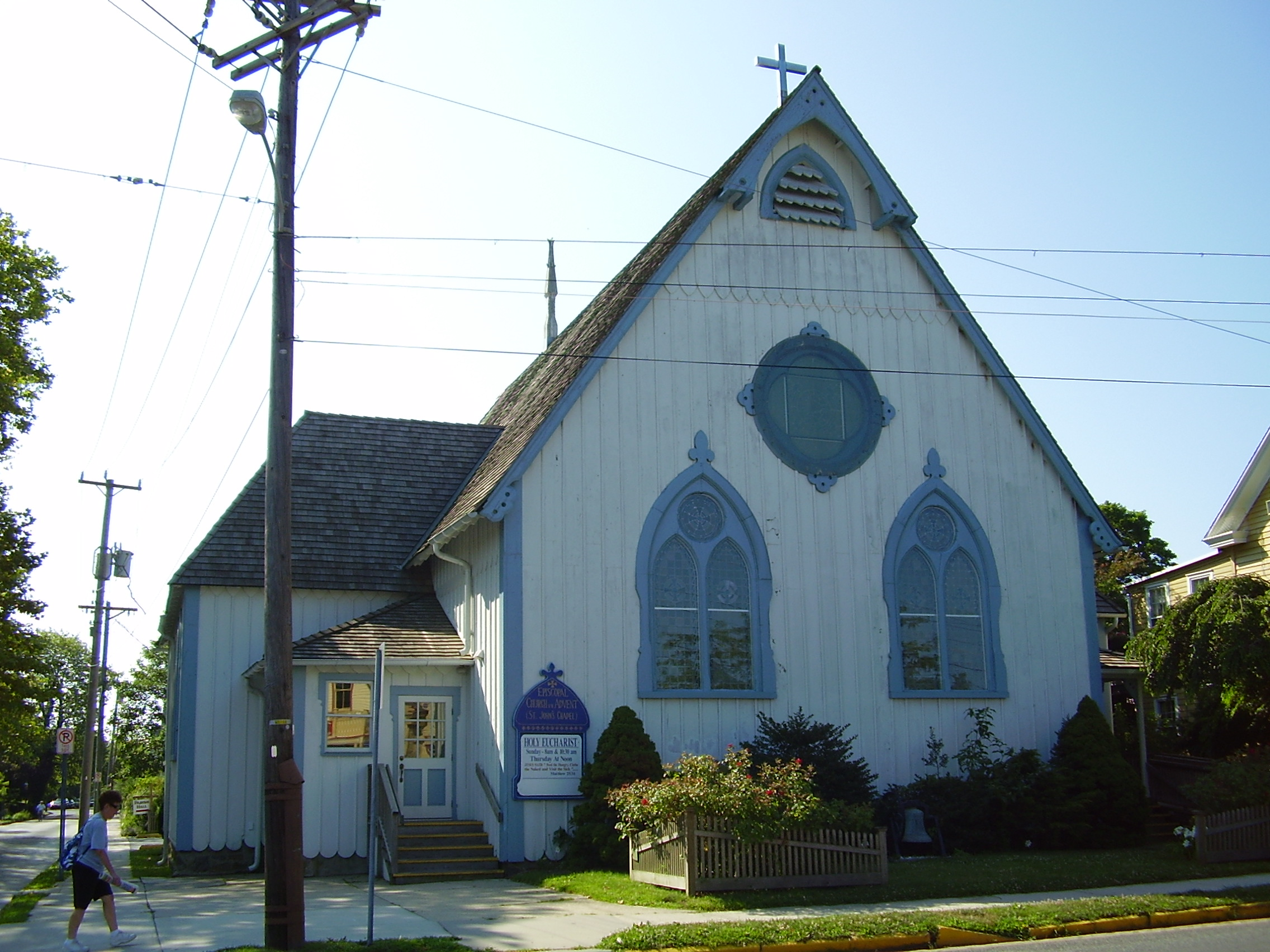
- January 2005

- Location within Cape May County, New Jersey Location within New Jersey Location within the United States
- Location: Franklin and Washington Streets; Cape May, New Jersey
- Coordinates: 38.934792°N 74.919955°W
- Built: 1865, consecrated: July 1871
- Architect: Henry Augustus Sims; Richard Souder, builder
- Part of: Cape May Historic District (ID70000383)

The Episcopal Church of the Advent / St. John's Chapel is an historic Carpenter Gothic style Episcopal church building located at Franklin and Washington streets in Cape May, Cape May County, New Jersey, United States. Its board and batten siding, steep roofs, lancet windows and rose window are distinguishing features of Carpenter Gothic style architecture, although it lacks the usual belfry tower front entrance. Designed by the architect Henry Sims, it was built by Richard Soder beginning in 1865 for St. John's Chapel, a "summer chapel", which had been organized two years earlier. It was not consecrated, however, until 1871.

It is an active parish in the Episcopal Diocese of New Jersey. Its rector is the Rev. H. Alan Leonard. The Rev. Daniel Hall is assisting clergy. The church reported 340 members in 2015 and 331 members in 2023; no membership statistics were reported nationally in 2024 parochial reports. Plate and pledge income reported for the congregation in 2024 was $226,026. Average Sunday attendance (ASA) in 2024 was 61 persons, down from a reported 125 in 2016.

== History ==
In 1950, St. John's merged with the Episcopal Church of the Advent, which had been formed in 1899 to serve the needs of local Episcopalians during the other three seasons of the year. The new congregation took the name Episcopal Church of the Advent / St. John's Chapel.

The Episcopal Church of the Advent / St. John's Chapel is a contributing property in the Cape May Historic District, which was added to the National Register of Historic Places in 1970.

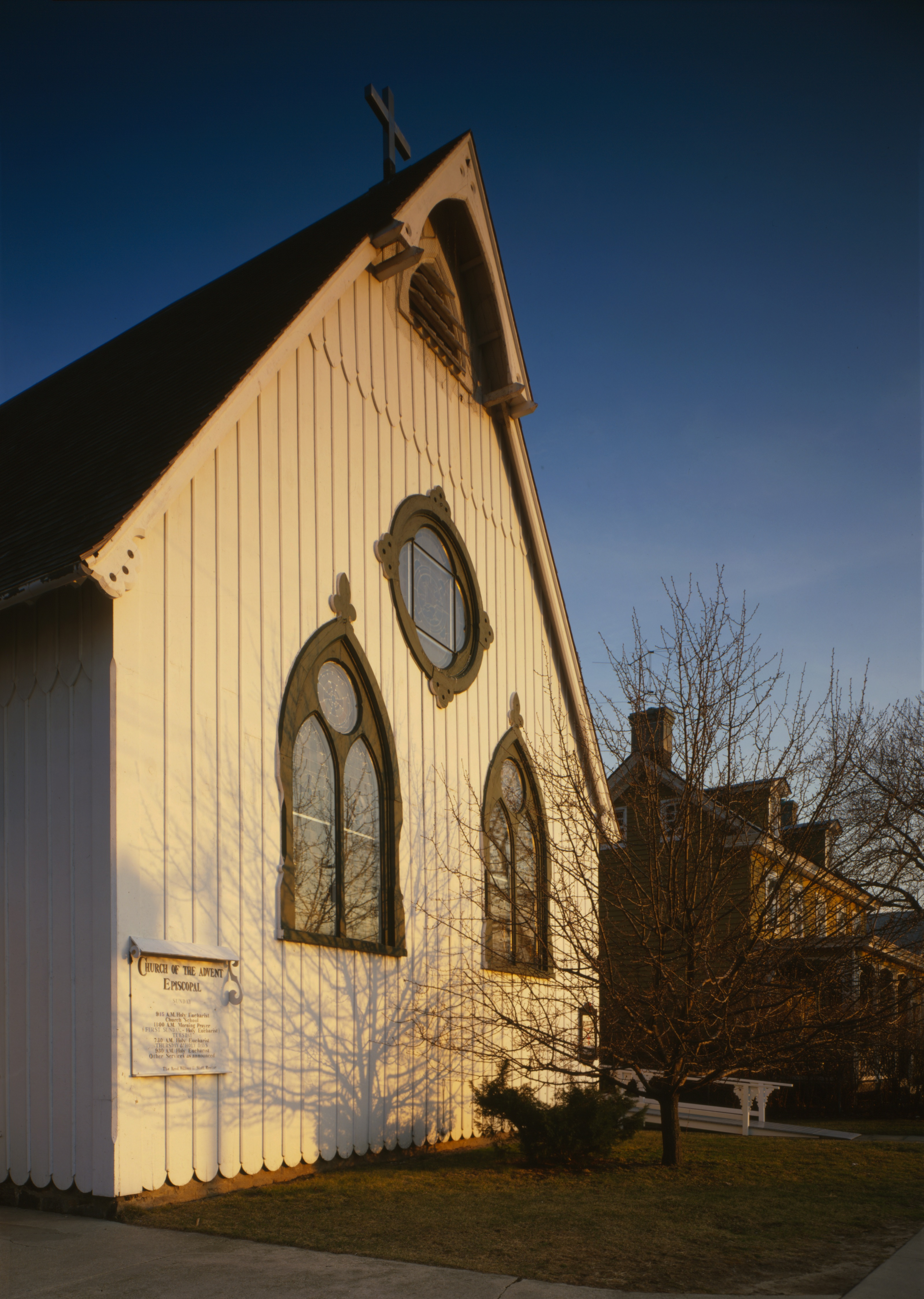
September 1977

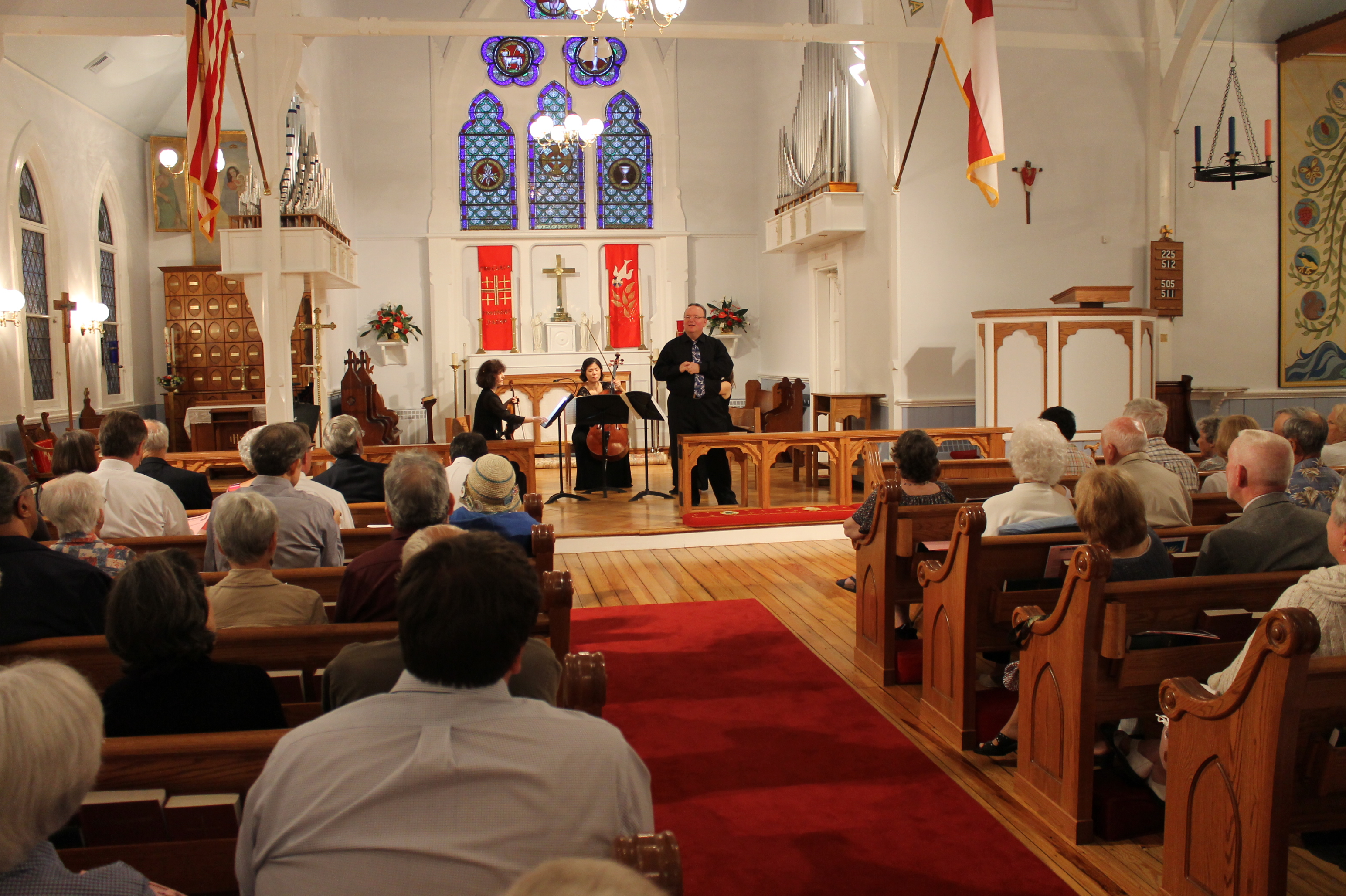
New Jersey Symphony Chamber Players performing inside the church
