= Samuel Hemphill (reverend) =

(Not to be confused with Samuel Hemphill, Anglican priest)

Samuel Hemphill (1705–1741) was a Presbyterian minister who emigrated from Ireland to the British colonies in America in 1734, and was associated with Benjamin Franklin who publicly defended him from rival members of the Presbyterian Synod, including Jonathan Dickinson, who accused him of unsound Biblical preaching. Hemphill's case proved to be the first heresy trial in American Presbyterian history. Franklin's articles defending Hemphill are considered the clearest indication of what Franklin thought the Christian faith ought to embrace.

== Ministry ==
Born in the Ulster Province in Ireland, Hemphill emigrated to the colonies in 1734. He was educated at the University of Glasgow and was licensed to preach by the Strabane Presbytery in 1729/30. Hemphill and Reverend Patrick Vance, an older man who ministered in County Donegal, while referring to the same scripture, disagreed on various points of its interpretation. As their disagreements compounded Vance subsequently accused Hemphill of deviating from the scriptures, and said as much in a letter to his brother-in-law in America, portraying Hemphill as an "eminent instrument of the devil", whose preaching would mislead the various congregations in developing American churches.

Having subscribed to the Westminster Confession of Faith as required, Hemphill was ordained to minister in America. Upon his arrival in the colonies, He was invited by Reverend Jedediah Andrews, (Note: Reverend Andrews was ordained and installed as pastor of the First Church in 1701, the year in which Philadelphia received its charter as a city. He served at this church for nearly fifty years.) minister of Philadelphia's First Presbyterian church, to join him as assistant. Andrews, however, began to regret,the arrangement as Hemphill began to draw Deists and so called "free thinkers" to the congregation who were in line with Hemphill's interpretation of scripture. This development compounded the existing controversy that already hung over Hemphill.and only fueled the controversy among the Synod and many others in the congregation.

In April 1735, Andrews and conservative church leaders charged Hemphill with heterodoxy (heresy) and "unsound and dangerous" preaching. During the subsequent trial the seven members of the Synod's commission appointed to try the case unanimously found him guilty and suspended his license to preach.

That Mr. Hemphill be suspended from all the parts of his ministerial Office until the next meeting of our Synod, and that it be referred to the Synod to judge, when met, whether the Suspension shall be continued or taken off, or whatever else shall be judged needful to be done, according as things shall then appear: And accordingly we do suspend the said Mr. Samuel Hemphill as above.

== Franklin's defense of Hemphill ==
Benjamin Franklin, though raised as a Presbyterian, later in life, found their doctrines too rigid to suit his purposes. He found their sermons, "very dry, uninteresting, and unedifying, since not a single moral principle was inculcated or enforced, their aim seeming to be rather to make us Presbyterians than good citizens". When Hemphill arrived in Philadelphia, however, he found his sermons more livelier and admired and respected his emphasis on 'Good works', to which the orthodox Presbyterians disapproved. In his autobiography Franklin revealed that, "I became his zealous partisan, and contributed all I could to raise a party in his favor...."

Jonathan Dickinson, though he did not attended Hemphill's actual trial, nonetheless played a critical role of defending the Presbyterian Synod's authority to suspend Hemphill and spearheaded the subsequent high-profile theological pamphlet war against Benjamin Franklin. In 1735 Dickinson had published a sermon supporting the Synod accusations against Hemphill's defense. Franklin, however, thought Hemphill gave ‘‘excellent Discourses’’ and attended his sermons frequently, and later said as much in his Autobiography. Franklin had defended Hemphill in 1735 because he favored Hemphill's emphasis on practical moral virtue over dry Calvinist dogmatism, and he opposed the local clergy's efforts to silence free expression and free-thinking ministers. In the October 30, 1735 issue of the Pennsylvania Gazette, Franklin published A Defense of Mr. Hemphill’s Observations, [30 October 1735]. The three noted pamphlets Franklin wrote in Hemphill's defense include:

- A Letter to a Friend in the Country (containing the substance of a sermon preach'd at Philadelphia, in the congregation of the Rev. Mr. Hemphill...)
- Some Observations on the Proceedings against the Rev. Mr. Hemphill (with a vindication of his sermons)
- A Defense of Mr. Hemphill's Observations (or, an Answer to the Vindication of the Reverend Commission)

Despite Franklin's advocacy and public support through the Gazette, it was discovered during the dispute that Hemphill had plagiarized many of his sermons from other writers. Following this revelation, his support collapsed, and the Synod of Philadelphia permanently revoked his license to preach in September 1735. Regretting that he had been a highly visible supporter of Hemphill, Franklin subsequently stopped attending the Philadelphia's Presbyterian Church, though he continued to contribute to it financially. Franklin still held favor for Hemphill in regards to the substance of his sermons, such that they were.

I stuck by him, however; I rather approved his giving us good sermons composed by others, than bad ones of his own manufacture...He afterwards acknowledged to me, that none of those he preached were his own...

Franklin's articles defending Hemphill's sermons are considered the clearest discourses he ever made about what he through Christianity ought to be. He held Good works over Faith; when he maintained:

Morality or Virtue is the End, Faith only a means to obtain that End: And if the End be obtained, it is no matter by what Means.

...a view embraced by Hemphill and contended by orthodox Presbyterians and many other Christian denominations.

After the trial, Hemphill fell from grace in the eyes of the Synod and much of the public and virtually disappeared into obscurity. Due to his subsequent short-lived vocation as a Presbyterian minister, little documentation is extant regarding his early life and his death at the relatively young age of 36.

== See also ==
- First Presbyterian Church (Philadelphia)
- Presbyterian Church in Ireland
- First Great Awakening
- George Whitefield — Controversial Methodist preacher associated with Benjamin Franklin

== Bibliography ==
- Barker, William S. (Winter 1991). "The Hemphill Case, Benjamin Franklin and Subscription to the Westminster Confession". American Presbyterians. 69 (4): 243–256. JSTOR 23332701.
- Bryan, F. LeBeau (Autumn 1976). "The Subscription Controversy and Jonathan Dickinson". Journal of Presbyterian History (1962–1985). 54 (3): 317–335. JSTOR 23327822.
- Christensen, Merton A. (July 1953). "Franklin on the Hemphill Trial: Deism Versus Presbyterian Orthodoxy". The William and Mary Quarterly. 10 (3): 422–440. doi:10.2307/1917483. JSTOR 1917483.
- Franklin, Benjamin. "A Defense of Mr. Hemphill's Observations, [30 October 1735]". National Archives.
- Franklin, Benjamin (1850) [1771–1790]. The Autobiography of Benjamin Franklin. Houghton, Mifflin and Company.
- Klett, Guy S. (1937). Presbyterians in colonial Pennsylvania. Philadelphia: University of Pennsylvania University of Pennsylvania.
- Lunney, Linde (2009). "Hemphill, Samuel". Dictionary of Irish Biography.
- Morgan, Edmund S. (2003). Benjamin Franklin. New Haven: Yale University Press. ISBN 978-0-3001-0162-1.
- Sprague, William Buell (1858). Annals of the American Pulpit 1869. Vol. III. New York: Amos Press.
- Van Doren, Carl (1938). Benjamin Franklin. New York: The Viking Press.
- Webster, Richard (1858). A history of the Presbyterian church in America : from its origin until the year 1760. Philadelphia: Joseph M. Wilson.
- White, William P. (June 1914). "Presbyterian Churches of Philadelphia: Their Organization and Changes of Location and Name". Journal of the Presbyterian Historical Society (1901–1930). 7 (6): 257–273. JSTOR 23323373.
- "Presbyterian History and Beliefs". First Presbyterian Church.
