= T. Roney Williamson =

American architect (1852–1896)

Thomas Roney Williamson
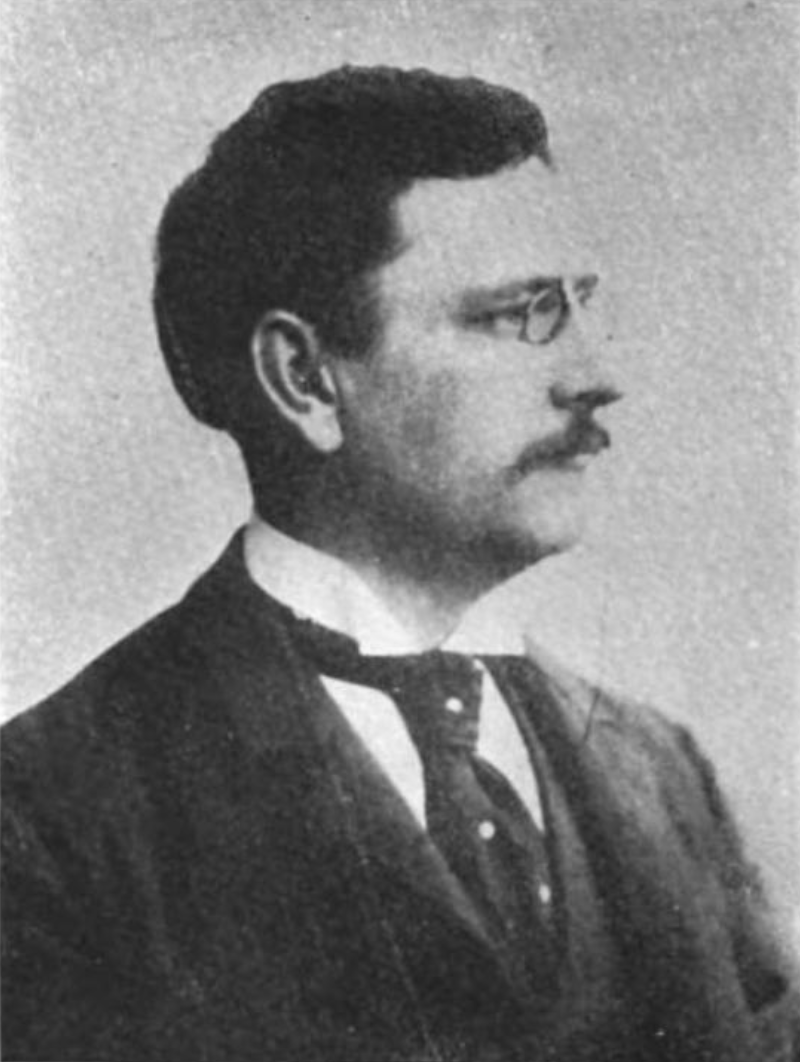
- Born: October 30, 1852; West Chester, Pennsylvania, U.S.
- Died: September 12, 1896 (aged 43); Longport, New Jersey, U.S.
- Occupation: Architect
- Style: Queen Anne style

Thomas Roney Williamson (October 30, 1852 – September 12, 1896) was an American architect based in Philadelphia and West Chester, Pennsylvania. He trained with Henry Augustus Sims and worked chiefly in the Queen Anne style.

== Biography ==
Williamson was born to Edward Hand and Anna (Roney) Williamson in 1852 in West Chester, Pennsylvania. His father and grandfather were both prominent attorneys in the region. He attended John Wiley Faires' academy in Philadelphia and at the age of 18 or 19 apprenticed to architect Henry Augustus Sims. He went homesteading in Colorado but injured his foot and returned to Philadelphia to resume his training in 1873.

After Sims died in 1875, Williamson continued to practice with James Peacock Sims. In 1879, Williamson launched his own architectural firm from offices in the Merchants' Exchange Building, in partnership with his younger brother, William Williamson, who in 1890 established a branch office in Grand Rapids, Michigan. Williamson returned to live in his hometown of West Chester in 1884 but continued to maintain an office in Philadelphia, to which he commuted almost daily. He became a full member of the Philadelphia Chapter of the American Institute of Architects in 1875.

On September 12, 1896, Williamson died suddenly of a heart attack while vacationing at the seaside cottage of his friend Thomas S. Butler in Longport, New Jersey. He was 43 years old. He was interred at the Oaklands Cemetery in West Goshen Township. His wife, Ada Clendenin, and children Charles and Ada survived him.

== Architecture ==
Williamson worked chiefly in the Queen Anne style using a range of colors and textures. He practiced principally in Pennsylvania and New Jersey. He specialized in residential architecture, but his output included dozens of academic, ecclesiastical, and commercial buildings. Williamson was among the handful of Pennsylvania architects to use serpentine routinely in their projects, designing West Chester University's Recitation Hall, a large gym modeled on Harvard's Hemenway Gymnasium, an auditorium that could seat nearly a thousand people, and the house of college president George Morris Philips (known as "Green Gables"). The latter trio of buildings have since been demolished, with the president's house being replaced by Philips Memorial Building. Also constructed of serpentine were Williamson's 1889 tower (since demolished) and 1892 choir building of West Chester's Holy Trinity Episcopal Church.

In 1893, Williamson designed a Chester County Courthouse annex built of Indiana limestone and measuring 50 x 158 feet (15 x 48 meters). He also designed the West Chester Public Library (which opened in 1888), the High Street Public School (since demolished), the West Chester Fire Company No. 1 building (dedicated in 1888), and dozens of stores and residences throughout West Chester and the Philadelphia region. One of his projects beyond the region was to design the Dimmick Memorial Library in Jim Thorpe.

In 1890, Williamson authored a "Pamphlet on Building, Lighting, Heating, Ventilating and Repairing Schoolhouses, together with Hints on the Care and Construction of Out Houses," copies of which went out to all school directors in Chester County.

== Gallery of projects ==
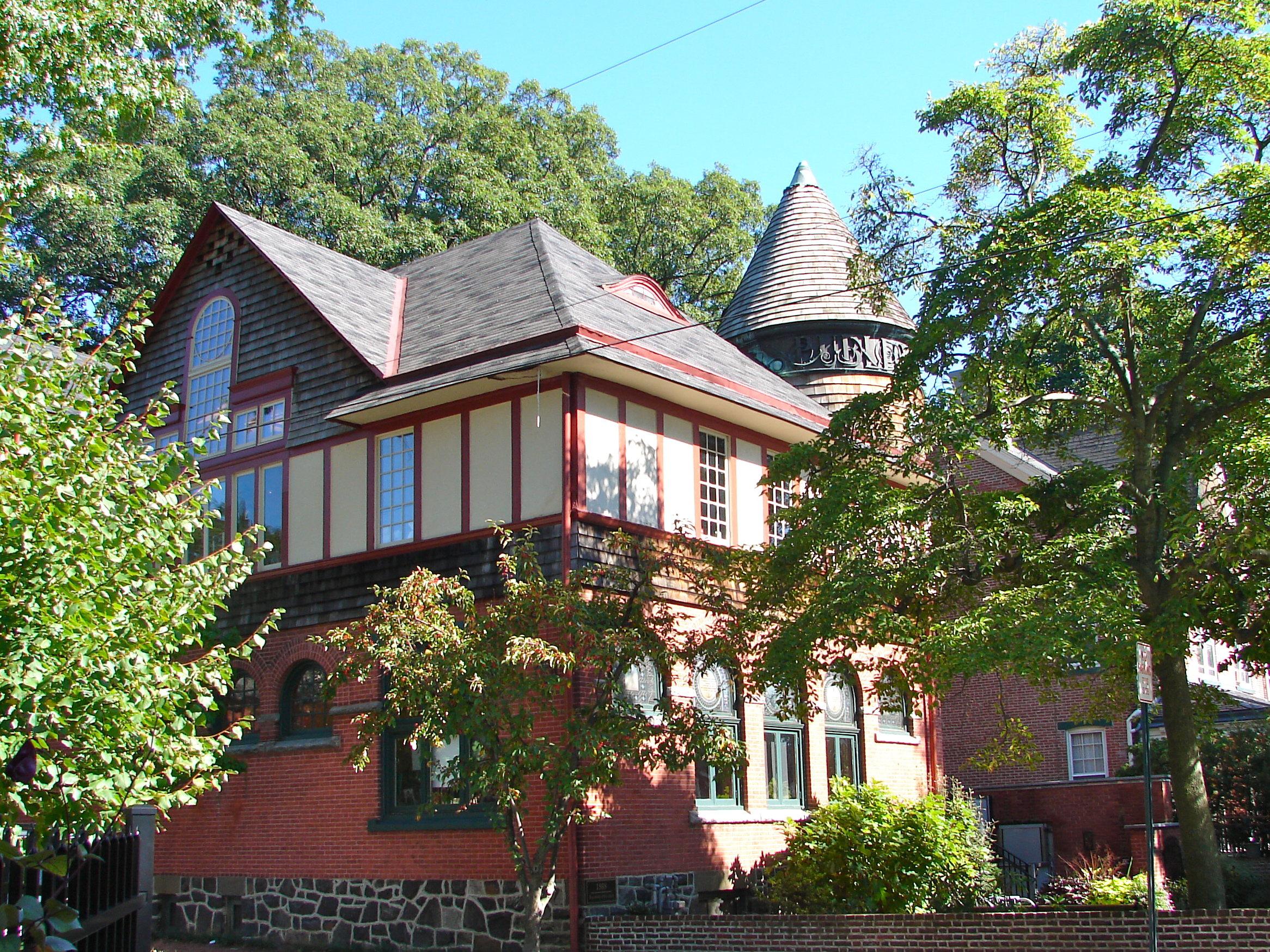
West Chester Public Library, 1888

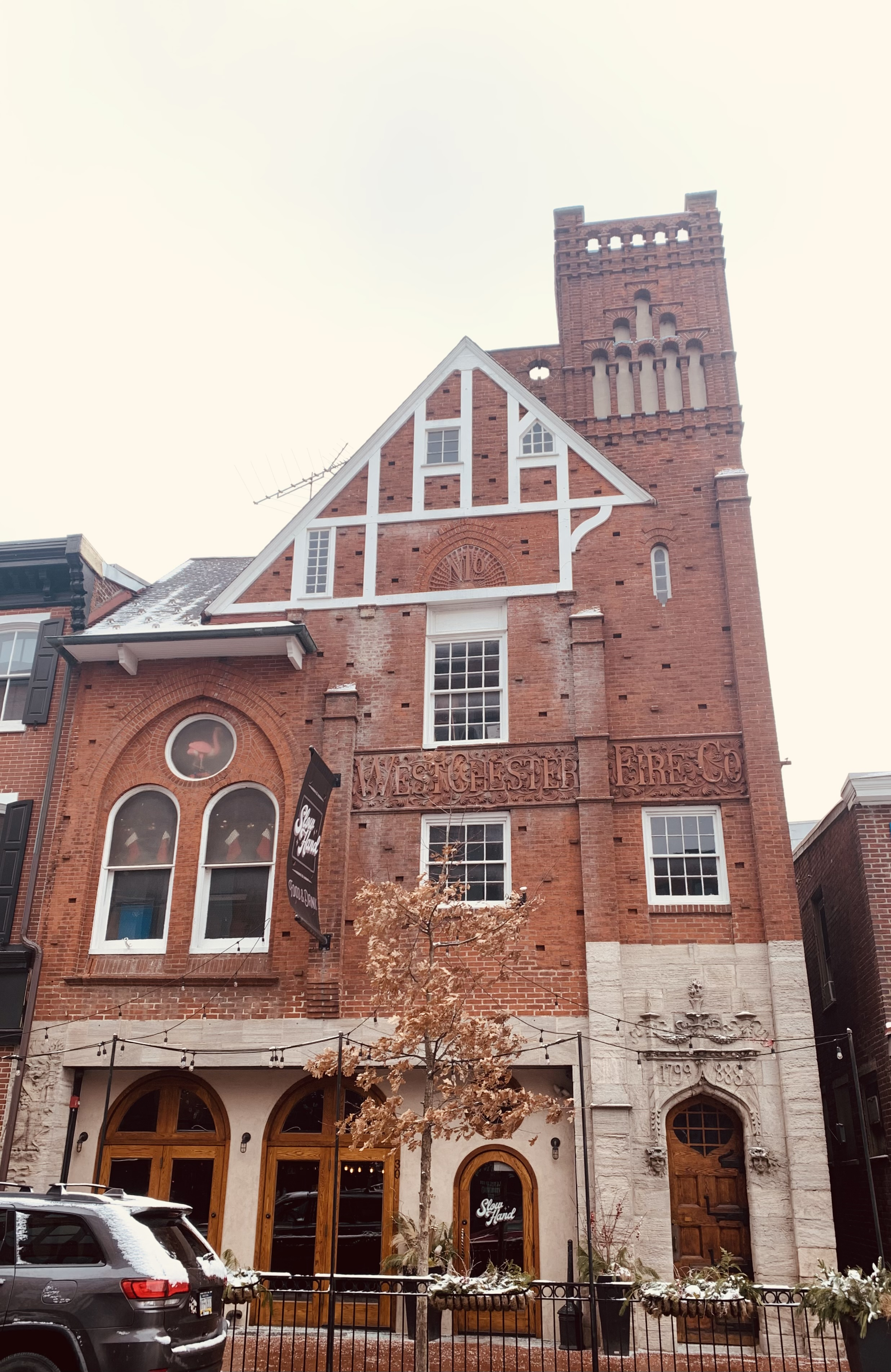
West Chester Fire House No. 1, 1888

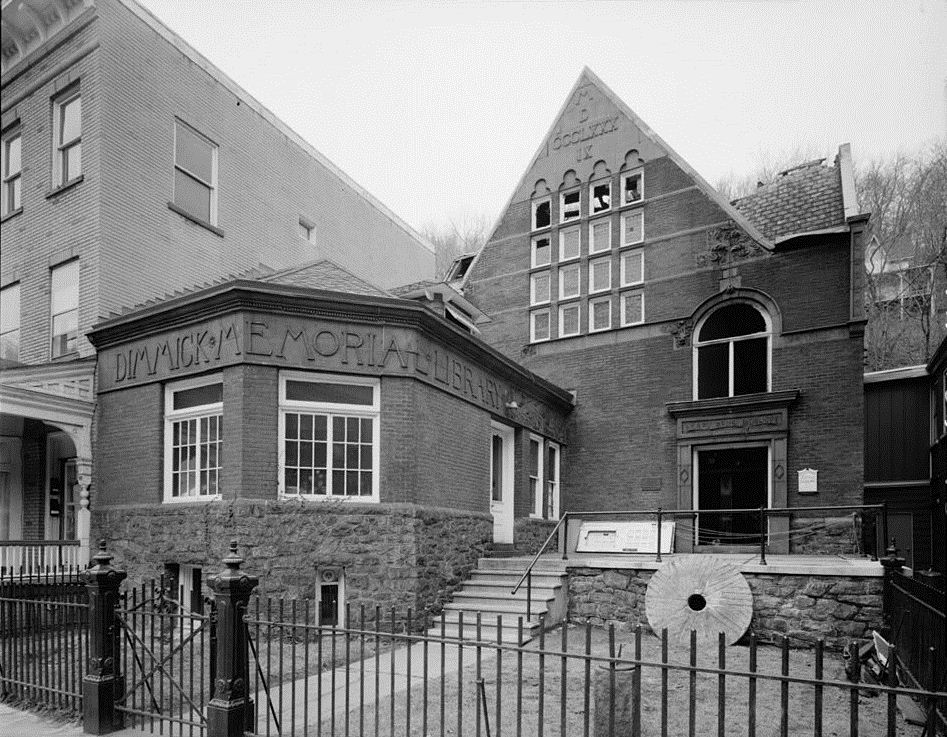
Dimmick Memorial Library, 1889

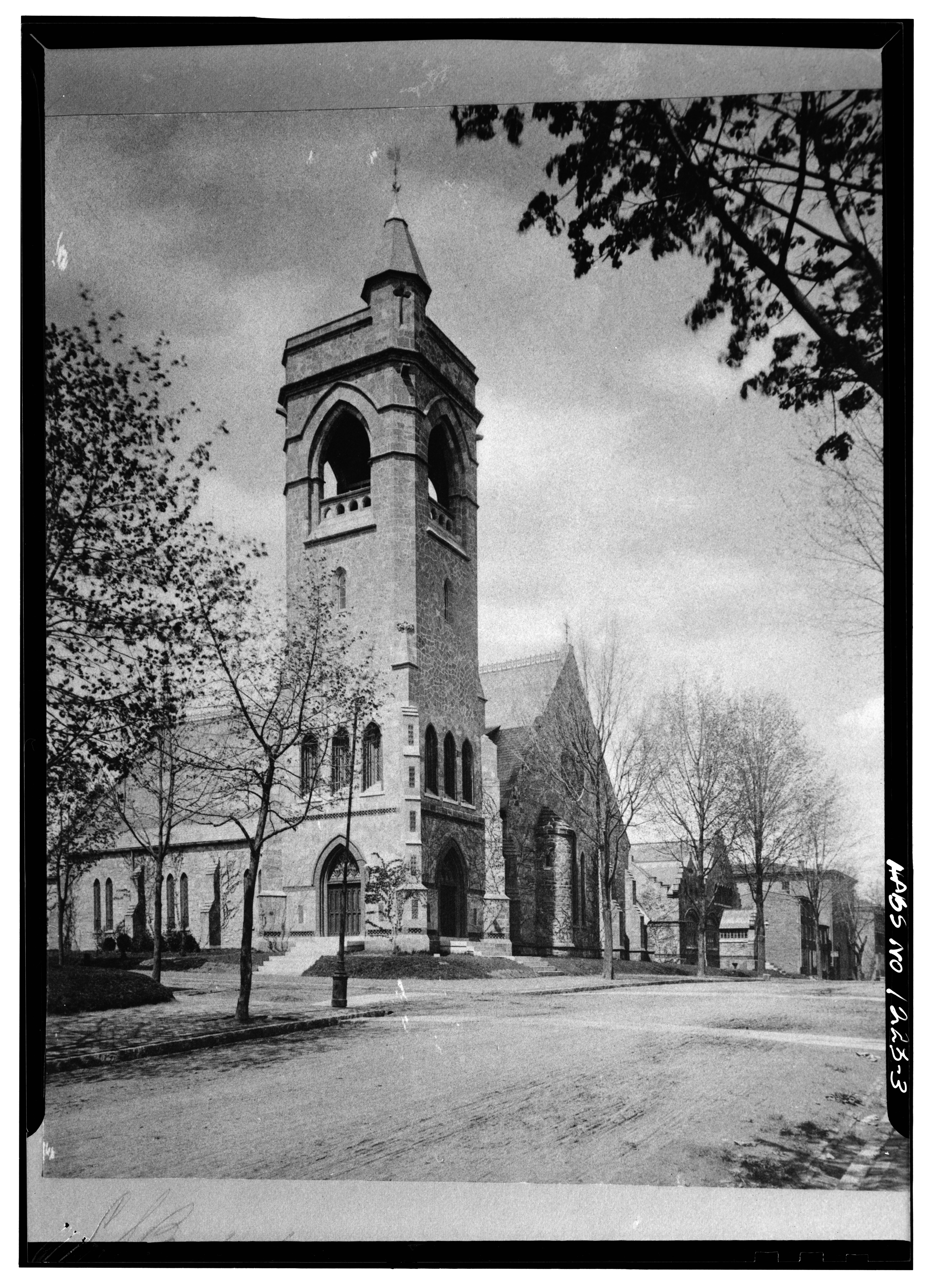
Tower of Holy Trinity Episcopal Church of West Chester, 1889

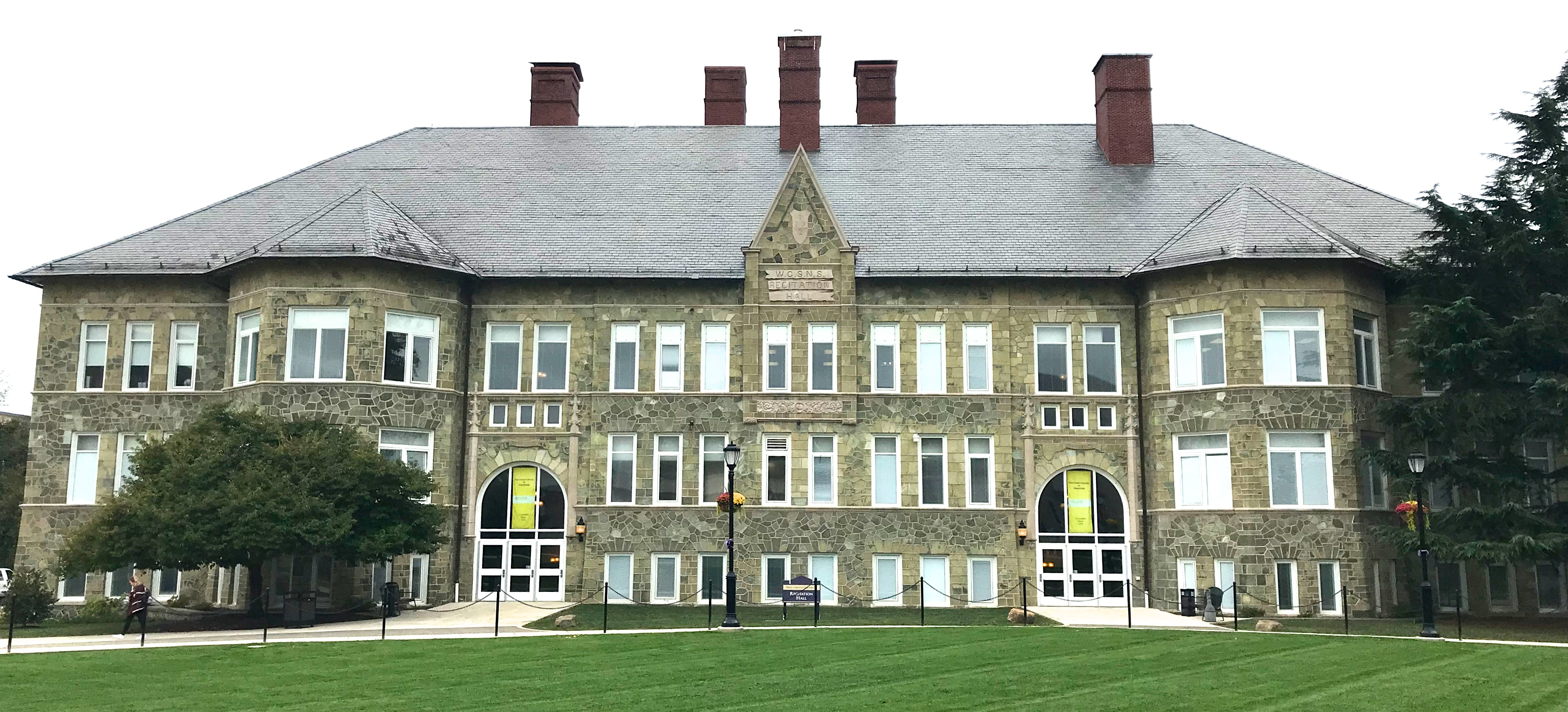
Recitation Hall, West Chester State Normal School, 1892

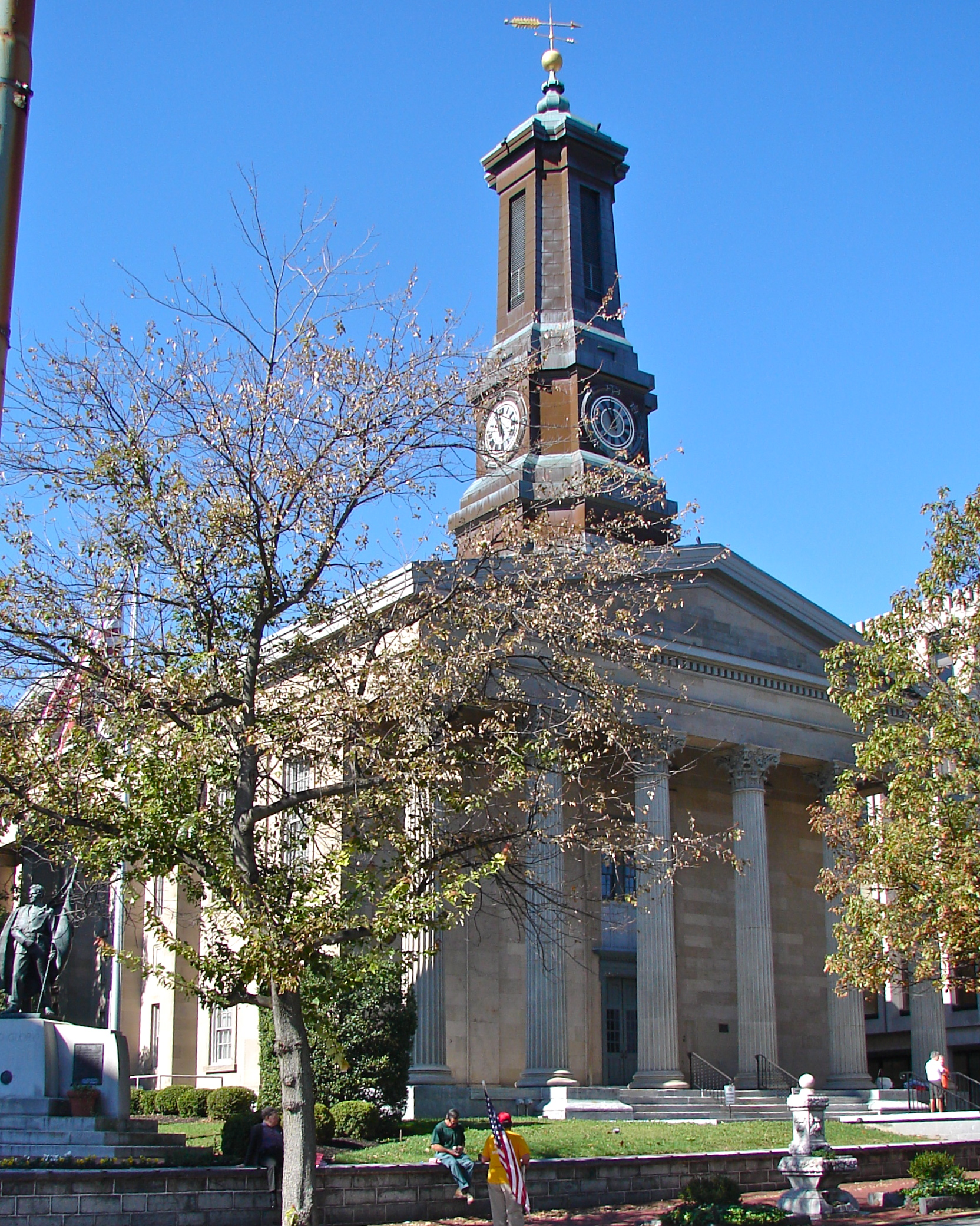
Chester County Courthouse, 1893
