= Albert Barnes (theologian) =

American clergyman and abolitionist

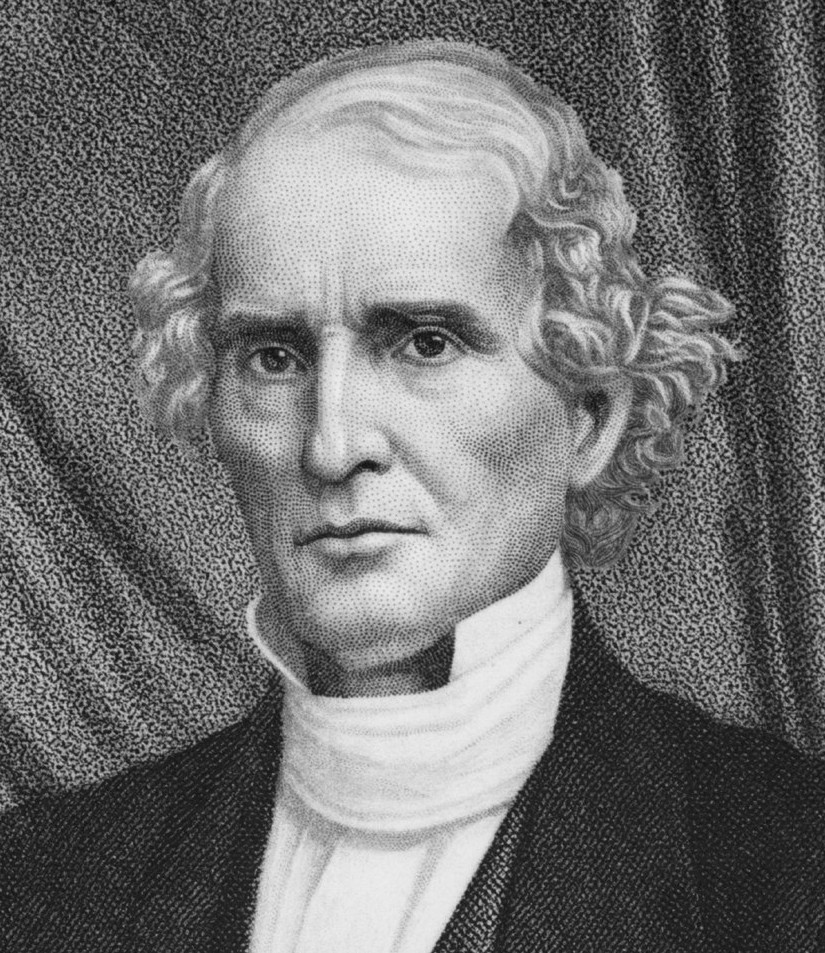
- Engraving of Barnes by George E. Perine
- Born: December 1, 1798; Rome, New York
- Died: December 24, 1870 (aged 72); Philadelphia, Pennsylvania
- Occupations: theologian, author

Albert Barnes (December 1, 1798 – December 24, 1870) was an American theologian, clergyman, abolitionist, temperance advocate, and author. Barnes is best known for his extensive Bible commentary and notes on the Old and New Testaments, published in a total of 14 volumes in the 1830s.

== Biography ==
Barnes was born in Rome, New York. He graduated from Hamilton College in Clinton, New York in 1820, and from Princeton Theological Seminary in 1823. Barnes was ordained as a Presbyterian minister by the presbytery of Elizabethtown, New Jersey, in 1825, and was the pastor successively of the Presbyterian Church in Morristown, New Jersey (1825–1830), and of the First Presbyterian Church of Philadelphia (1830–1868).

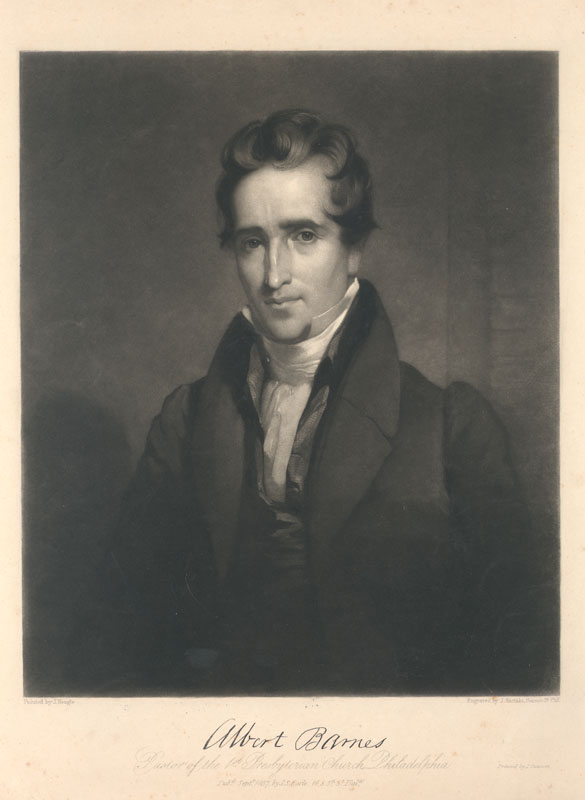
Albert Barnes (by James Neagle)

Barnes held a prominent place in the New School branch of the Presbyterians during the Old School-New School Controversy, to which he adhered on the division of the denomination in 1837. He had been tried (but not convicted) for heresy in 1836, mostly due to the views he expressed in Notes, Explanatory and Practical, on the Epistle to the Romans (1834) of the imputation of the sin of Adam, original sin and the atonement; the bitterness stirred up by this trial contributed towards widening the breach between the conservative and the progressive elements in the church. (Note: For the views he expressed, see: Barnes, Albert (1834). Notes, Explanatory and Practical, on the Epistle to the Romans. New York City: Leavitt, Lord & Company. p. 1. Selectable text: sacred-texts.com)

During the Old School-New School split in the Presbyterian Church in the United States of America, Barnes allied himself with the New School Branch. He served as moderator of the General Assembly to the New School branch in 1851. According to the Encyclopædia Britannica: "He was an eloquent preacher, but his reputation rests chiefly on his expository works, which are said to have had a larger circulation both in Europe and America than any others of their class."

Of the well-known Notes on the New Testament, it is said that more than a million volumes had been issued by 1870. The Notes on Job, the Psalms, Isaiah and Daniel were also popularly distributed. The popularity of these works rested on how Barnes simplified Biblical criticism so that new developments in the field were made accessible to the general public. Barnes was the author of several other works, including Scriptural Views of Slavery (1846) and The Way of Salvation (1863). A collection of his theological works was published in Philadelphia in 1875.

Barnes was an abolitionist. In his book The Church and Slavery (1857), Barnes excoriates slavery as evil and immoral, and calls for it to be dealt with from the pulpit "as other sins and wrongs are" (most pointedly in chapter VII, "The Duty of the Church at Large on the Subject of Slavery"). In his famous 1852 oratory, "What to the Slave Is the Fourth of July?", Frederick Douglass quoted Barnes as saying: "There is no power out of the church that could sustain slavery an hour, if it were not sustained in it." (Note: For Douglass's speech, see: Douglass, Frederick (July 5, 1852). What to the Slave is the Fourth of July? (Speech). Ladies Antislavery Society of Rochester. Corinthian Hall, Rochester, New York.)

Barnes was a temperance advocate who encouraged complete abstinence from alcohol.

Barnes was elected to the American Philosophical Society in 1855. While serving as pastor at the First Presbyterian Church of Philadelphia, Barnes became the president of the Pennsylvania Bible Society (located at 7th and Walnut) in 1858 – a position he served until his death in 1870. He served at First Presbyterian Church of Philadelphia until 1868. He was then granted the title Pastor Emeritus.

== Death ==
Barnes died in Philadelphia on December 24, 1870, of natural causes, 23 days after his 72nd birthday. His widow wrote:

His death was sudden and entirely unexpected. His health, with the exception of his eyesight, seemed to be perfect, -- mind and body active and full of energy. The day he died, he spent the morning in the city, dined with us cheerfully as usual, and afterwards walked with my daughter about a mile and a quarter into the country, to visit some friends in deep affliction. They reached the house, and he conversed for a few minutes, when he threw back his head, breathed rather heavily, and before the physician, who was immediately summoned, could arrive, he had passed away. In an instant, as it seemed, without pain or any consciousness of entering the 'dark valley,' he was with his Saviour.

== Bibliography ==
- Barnes, Albert. Essays on Intemperance. Morristown, New Jersey: J. Mann, 1828.
- Barnes, Albert. "The Way of Salvation": A Sermon, Delivered at Morristown, New Jersey, February 8. 1829, together with Mr. Barnes' Defence of the Sermon, Read before the Synod of Philadelphia, at Lancaster, October 29, 1830, and His "Defence" before the Second Presbytery of Philadelphia, in Reply to the Charges of the Rev. Dr. George Junkin. 7th ed. New York: Leavitt, Lord, 1836.
- Barnes, Albert. Albert Barnes on the Maine Liquor Law: The Throne of Iniquity, or, Sustaining Evil by Law: A Discourse in Behalf of a Law Prohibiting the Traffic in Intoxicating Drinks—Delivered in the First Presbyterian Church, Philadelphia, Feb. 1, 1852, and in the Presbyterian Church, Harrisburg, Feb. 29, 1852. Philadelphia: T. B. Peterson, 1852.
- Barnes, Albert. An Inquiry into the Scriptural Views of Slavery. Philadelphia: Parry and McMillan, 1857. Reprint, New York: Negro Universities, 1969.
- Barnes, Albert. The Church and Slavery. Philadelphia: Parry and McMillan, 1857. Reprint, New York: Negro Universities, 1969.
- Barnes, Albert. The Atonement in its Relations to Law and Moral Government. Philadelphia: Parry & McMillan, 1859.
- Barnes, Albert (December 1868) [1832]. Frew, Robert (ed.). Notes on the New Testament: Explanatory and Practical. Vol. I - Matthew and Mark. London: Blackie and Son. Selectable text: Notes on the Bible by Albert Barnes: Matthew: Matthew index and Notes on the Bible by Albert Barnes: Mark: Mark index
- Barnes, Albert (1884) [1832]. Frew, Robert (ed.). Notes on the New Testament: Explanatory and Practical. Vol. II - Luke and John. London: Blackie and Son. Selectable text: Notes on the Bible by Albert Barnes: Luke: Luke index and Notes on the Bible by Albert Barnes: John: John index
- Barnes, Albert (1884) [1834]. Frew, Robert (ed.). Notes on the New Testament: Explanatory and Practical. Vol. III - Acts of the Apostles. London: Blackie and Son. Selectable text: Notes on the Bible by Albert Barnes: Acts: Acts index
- Barnes, Albert (1884) [1834]. Frew, Robert (ed.). Notes on the New Testament: Explanatory and Practical. Vol. IV - Romans. London: Blackie and Son. Selectable text: Notes on the Bible by Albert Barnes: Romans: Romans index
- Barnes, Albert. Notes on the New Testament: Explanatory and Practical. Vol. V: I Corinthians
- Barnes, Albert. Notes on the New Testament: Explanatory and Practical. Vol. VI: II Corinthians and Galatians
- Barnes, Albert. Notes on the New Testament: Explanatory and Practical. Vol. VII: Ephesians, Philippians, and Colossians
- Barnes, Albert. Notes on the New Testament: Explanatory and Practical. Vol. VIII: Thessalonians, Timothy, Titus, and Philemon
- Barnes, Albert. Notes on the New Testament: Explanatory and Practical. Vol. IX: Hebrews
- Barnes, Albert. Notes on the New Testament: Explanatory and Practical. Vol. X: James, Peter, John, and Jude
- Barnes, Albert. Notes on the New Testament: Explanatory and Practical. Vol. XI: Revelation
- Barnes, Albert. Notes on the Old Testament: Explanatory and Practical: Job Vol. 1
- Barnes, Albert. Notes on the Old Testament: Explanatory and Practical: Psalms Vol. 1
- Barnes, Albert. Notes on the Old Testament: Explanatory and Practical: Psalms Vol. 2
- Barnes, Albert. Notes on the Old Testament: Explanatory and Practical: Psalms Vol. 3
- Barnes, Albert. Notes on the Old Testament: Explanatory and Practical: Isaiah Vol. 1
- Barnes, Albert. Notes on the Old Testament: Explanatory and Practical: Isaiah Vol. 2
- Barnes, Albert. Notes on the Old Testament: Explanatory and Practical: Daniel Vol. 1
- Barnes, Albert. Notes on the Old Testament: Explanatory and Practical: Daniel vol. 2
- Barnes, Albert (1962). Barnes' Notes on the New Testament (Complete and unabridged in one volume). Grand Rapids, Michigan: Kregel Publications. ISBN 9780825493713.
- Barnes, Albert. Notes on the New Testament. London, Blackie & Son, 1884. Reprint, Grand Rapids: Baker Books, 1998.
- Barnes, Albert. Notes on the Old Testament. London, Blackie & Son, 1884. Reprint, Grand Rapids: Baker Books, 1998.
- Barnes, Albert. Scenes and Incidents in the Life of the Apostle Paul.

== Archival collections ==
The Presbyterian Historical Society in Philadelphia, Pennsylvania, has a collection of Barnes' original manuscripts, notes, sermons and lectures. The Burke Library Archives of the Union Theological Seminary in New York City, New York also has a collection of Barnes' sermons.
