= Washington County Courthouse (Maryland) =

- U.S. National Register of Historic Places
- U.S. Historic district – Contributing property
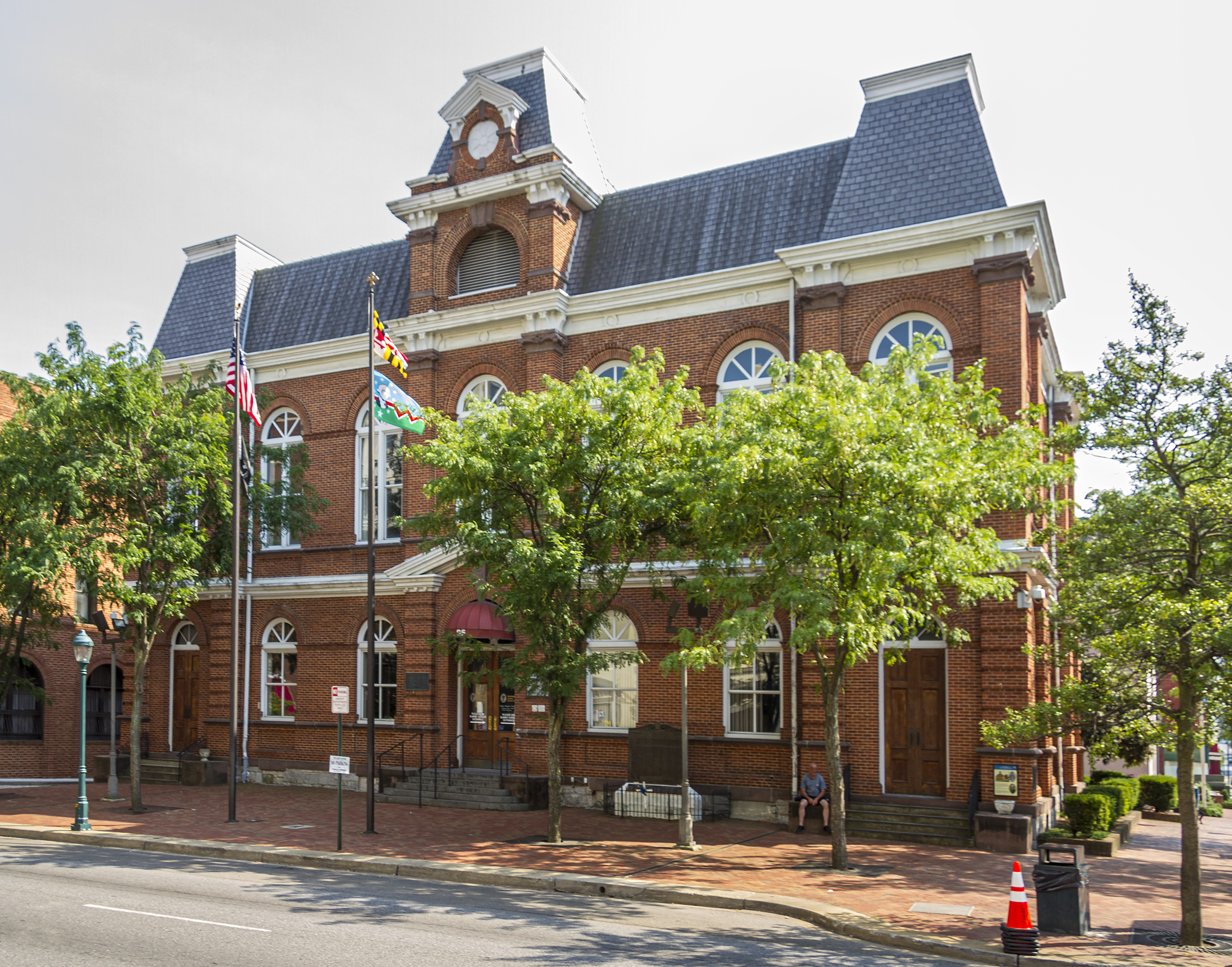

- Location within Maryland Location within the United States
- Location: W. Washington St. and Summit Ave., Hagerstown, Maryland
- Coordinates: 39°38′34″N 77°43′22″W
- Area: less than one acre
- Built: 1872
- Architect: Simms, J.P.; Thornburg, Robert C.
- Architectural style: Italianate
- NRHP reference No.: 74000976
- Added to NRHP: December 24, 1974

Washington County Courthouse is a historic courthouse building located at 95 West Washington Street in Hagerstown, Washington County, Maryland, United States. It is a two-story red brick structure with white trim and decorative work in brownstone, constructed in 1872 in the Italianate style. The building features a central tower on the front façade above the main entrance and a coursed limestone foundation from an earlier courthouse which burned. It also has a mansard roof covered with shingles. The annex was built in 1963.

It was listed on the National Register of Historic Places in 1974.
