= Chester County Courthouse (Pennsylvania) =

- U.S. National Register of Historic Places
- U.S. Historic district – Contributing property
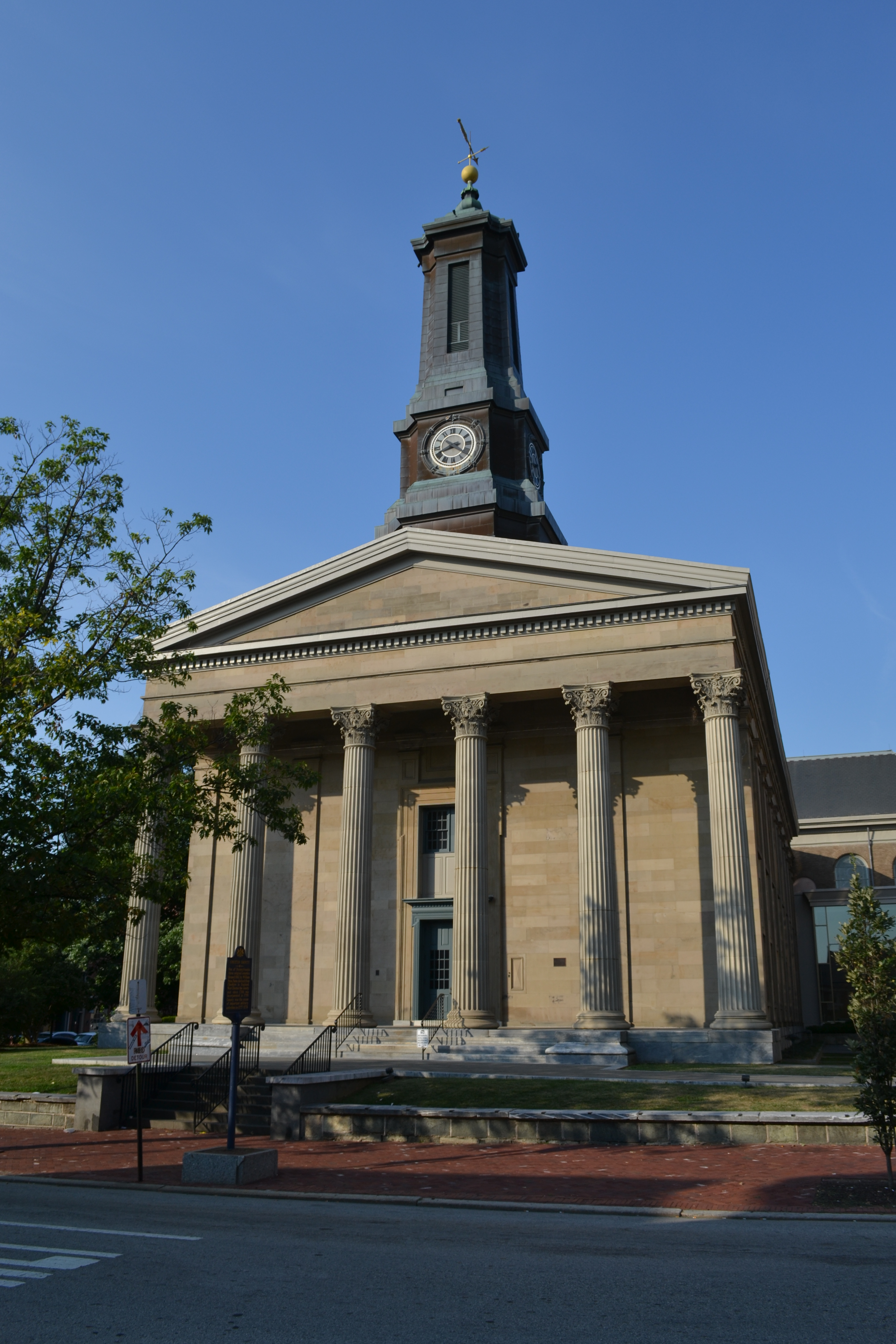
- Chester County Courthouse, August 2015

- Location within Pennsylvania Location within the United States
- Location: 2 North High Street, West Chester, Pennsylvania
- Coordinates: 39°57′35.5″N 75°36′18″W
- Area: ~3 acres (1.2 ha)
- Built: 1846
- Architect: Thomas U. Walter
- Architectural style: Georgian, Greek Revival
- NRHP reference No.: 72001109
- Added to NRHP: June 5, 1972

The Chester County Courthouse is a historic courthouse building located in the county seat of West Chester, Chester County, Pennsylvania. It was built in 1846 at a cost of $55,346 and was designed by Thomas U. Walter. Walter also designed the dome of the United States Capitol. An addition, designed by T. Roney Williamson and constructed from Indiana Limestone, was added in 1893. Another addition was added in 1966.

It was listed on the National Register of Historic Places on June 5, 1972, and located in the West Chester Downtown Historic District. It was documented by the Historic American Buildings Survey in July 1958.

== Background ==
The first courthouse to serve Chester County was the 1724 Chester Courthouse in Chester, and it is now listed separately on the National Register of Historic Places.

Following the transfer of the county seat from Chester, now located in Delaware County, to West Chester in 1786, the means of judicial law were conducted in a courthouse built in 1786, characterized as "miserable specime[n] of architecture". When it became apparent that the existing courthouse was inadequate in size, grand juries and several petitioners proposed a new courthouse to be erected in 1845, located at 10 North High Street. Though some individuals demurred, claiming that the proposed courthouse would be a burden upon taxpayers, local officials supported the project. Architect Thomas U. Walter was commissioned to design the courthouse. Ground was broken in early 1846, and the cornerstone was placed on 4 July; the courthouse was completed in late 1847, with the total cost of the project reaching $55,345.98. After construction finished, the building gradually filled with items and individuals being transferred to the new offices; by December, the courthouse was fully in use. The courthouse, since then, was regularly used as a rendezvous for residents; during the Civil War, "rousing patriotic meetings" were held, and speeches famous individuals orated in the building.

After years of complaints, the Chester County Court designated a commission of representatives from the Chester County Bar Association in 1888 to investigate the issue of lack of space in the new courthouse. Among the proposals considered was the addition of an additional wing to the courthouse facing westward toward Market Street. In 1890, the land required to build such an extension was secured, and in 1891, T. Roney Williamson was commissioned to design the addition. Plummer E. Jefferis was paid $75,030 to construct the 50 by 135 feet (15 m × 41 m) annex, which was started in June 1891 and finished in early 1893. The courtroom within the addition was first used in late 1892 as a result of an uptick in the number of cases, making it necessary to utilize the extra space while still under construction. In December 1892, the old courtroom was refurbished as well, though the addition was used until January 1893, when the overhaul of the original courtroom was completed. Thenceforth, both courtrooms were used simultaneously. The courtroom and renovation of the building was completed on 8 April 1893 at cost of $116,446.53. Courtroom 1 was later renovated again in 1966.

== Ten Commandments plaque ==
On 1 March 1920, county commissioners received the gift of a plaque imprinted with the text of the Ten Commandments from the Council of Religious Education of the Federated Churches of West Chester, which was unveiled on 11 December. The Reverend Charles R. Williamson claimed that the tablet would serve as "a reminder, to all who read as they pass by, of their duty and responsibility to God and their fellow men." In 2002, Sally Flynn, representing the Freethought Society of Greater Philadelphia, filed a complaint against Chester County regarding the plaque and requested its removal, alleging it was a violation of the Establishment Clause of the First Amendment to the United States Constitution, which stated that "Congress shall make no law respecting an establishment of religion". Freethought Society v. Chester County resulted in a court order stating that the county was "permanently enjoined" from the preservation of the tablet under the First Amendment. The defendant, the county, filed an appeal which was considered by the court, concluding in a second court order changing the terms of the original one: to cover the plaque with a material of the same color as the stone. A second appeal was filed in 2003 and reviewed by the United States Court of Appeals for the Third Circuit, resulting in the reversal of the original order and re-allowed the exhibition of the tablet.

== See also ==
- National Register of Historic Places listings in Chester County, Pennsylvania
- List of state and county courthouses in Pennsylvania
