= First Presbyterian Church (Philadelphia) =

Coordinates: 39.9505°N 75.1755°W

First Presbyterian Church in the City of Philadelphia
- First Presbyterian Church in the City of Philadelphia
- Location: 201 South 21st Street Philadelphia, Pennsylvania 19103
- Country: United States
- Language: English
- Denomination: Presbyterian (PCUSA)
- Website: fpcphila.org

History
- Former name(s): Second Presbyterian Church; Calvary Presbyterian Church
- Status: Open
- Founded: 1692
- Founder(s): Francis Makemie; Jedediah Andrews
- Dedicated: 1698

Architecture
- Functional status: Active
- Architect(s): Henry Augustus Sims(1872 Church); Theophilus P. Chandler Jr. (1884 Parish House); Frank Furness (1901 Tower); Harold E. Wagoner (1954 Chancel Renovations); Atkin Olshin Schade Architects (2010 FAMP Renovations)
- Architectural type: French and English Gothic
- Groundbreaking: 1869
- Completed: 1872, 1884, 1901, 1954, 2010

Specifications
- Materials: Exterior: Richmond granite and Trenton stone. Interior: Sandstone and black walnut (pews).

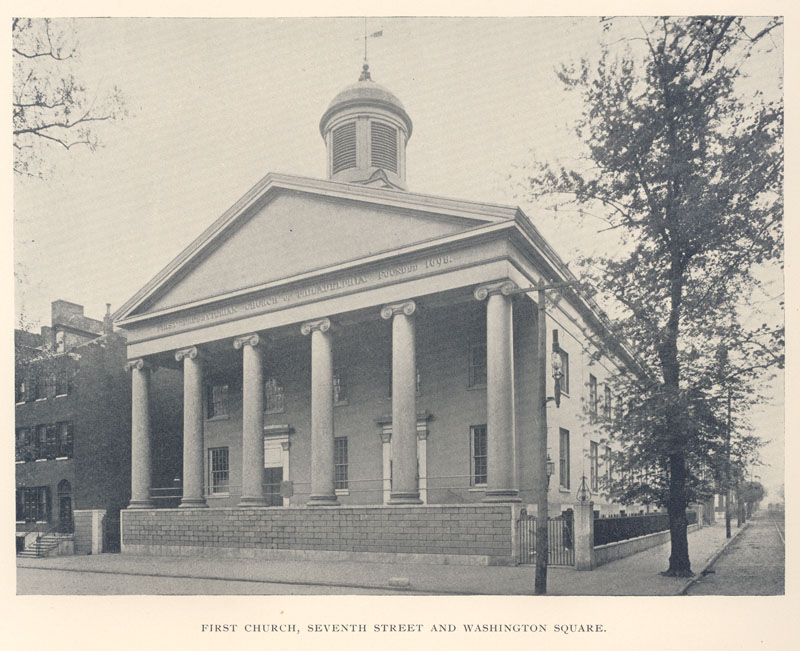
First Presbyterian Church of Philadelphia (1820, demolished 1939), SE corner 7th Street & Washington Square, John Haviland, architect.

The First Presbyterian Church is a Presbyterian Church USA congregation in the Center City neighborhood of Philadelphia, Pennsylvania, located on 21st and Walnut Streets, built in an array of architectural styles of leading Philadelphia architects. It is part of the Presbytery of Philadelphia within the Synod of the Trinity. The First Presbyterian Church is located within the Rittenhouse Fitler Historic District.

Today the congregation stands at about 280 members. As an urban parish, the church has long held a reputation for being open and welcoming, a trait it exhibited during the HIV/AIDS pandemic of the 1980s, when members founded MANNA and allowed openly lesbian, gay, bisexual and transgender (LGBTQ) leadership. First Church is a member of Covenant Network of Presbyterians.

== History ==
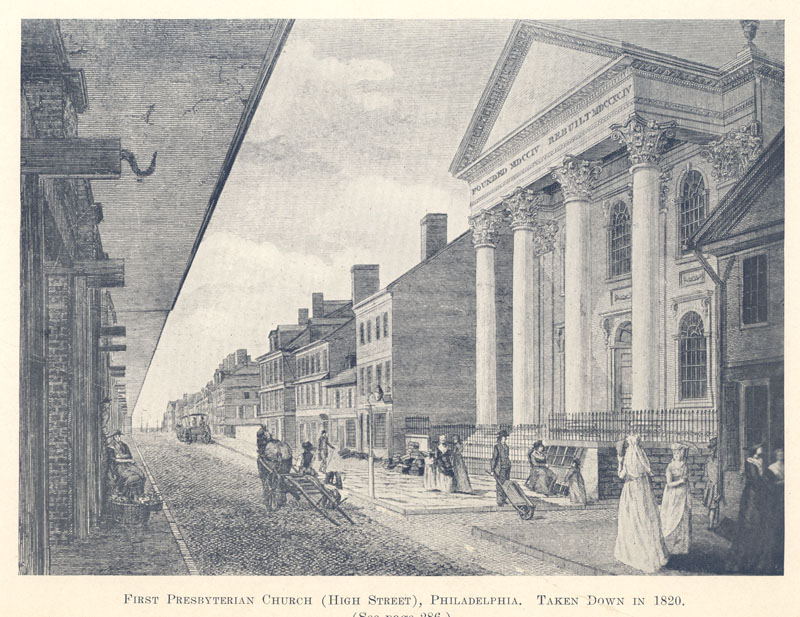
First Presbyterian Church, Philadelphia, on High Street.

The First Presbyterian Church in the City of Philadelphia, also known as 'First Church', was organized around 1692. Religious services began in a building known as the "Barbadoes Warehouse", located on the northwest corner of Second and Chestnut Streets. For a time, both Baptists and Congregationalists shared this facility with the Presbyterians.

In 1704, the congregation moved to the south side of High Street (now Market Street) at the corner of Bank Street. Here the first Presbyterian church in Philadelphia was established.

Founding senior pastor, the Rev. Jedediah Andrews, served this congregation for many years with the Rev. Robert Cross as his assistant. In 1746, however, the Rev. Andrews was stripped by the presbytery of his ability to serve in the ministry because of illicit acts committed with a married woman. (Minutes of the Presbytery of Philadelphia, Oct. 29, 1746.) Whether he was restored to his earlier position before he died in 1747 is not clear from later minutes.

In 1793, the High Street church building was renovated and made more spacious and elegant. Twenty-seven years later it was abandoned, due to unsafe conditions and the encroachment of the surrounding business district.

A new church was erected at Washington Square (Seventh and Locust Streets). At this church, in 1837, came the formation of the New School Assembly, from which emerged the Second Church.

During the 1920s, the church decided to relocate again partially due to the decay of city's Old City historic area. In 1929, the congregation merged with Calvary Presbyterian Church and moved to Locust Street near Fifteenth Street. The merged congregation kept the name First Presbyterian Church.

When the historic First and Second Presbyterian Churches in the City of Philadelphia joined to form one church in 1949, the united congregation adopted the name of the First Church (founded in 1698) and occupied the fourth building of the Second Church (founded 1743). The architect Henry Augustus Sims designed the present building at 21st and Walnut Streets and attended the dedication in October 1872.

Inter-generational reading program for children and retirees "Reading Buddies" was founded by First Church and member Mrs. Patricia Pfeiffer Quigg in 1968. The program continued for 50 years until 2018, upon Quigg's retirement, before her death in 2020. Quigg was honored by AARP in 2007 as Volunteer of the Year in Pennsylvania for her efforts.

During the early years of the AIDS global pandemic, First Church along with seven church members: Walla Dempsey, Mary Gainer, Kathryn “Kay” Keenze, Robert “Bob” Prischak, Reid Reames, Dixie Scoles, and Kenwyn Smith, founded MANNA in 1990 to feed sick neighbors within the city limits dying from AIDS and to provide support to those most in need of nourishment. MANNA has grown into an independent organization currently housed in the Spring Garden historic district. MANNA continues to fulfill the nourishment needs of neighbors with many health ailments guided by the mantra, based in nutrition research, "Food Is Medicine".

Lyric Fest with the mission to bring people together through the shared experience of song and story was founded and hosted during its formative years at First Church in 2003 by three Philadelphia-area musicians, Suzanne DuPlantis, mezzo-soprano; Laura Ward, pianist; and Randi Marrazzo, soprano. In 2011 Lyric Fest moved to its current permanent home at the Academy of Vocal Arts.

In June 2018 First Church elected and installed the 17th and the first openly gay pastor The Rev. Dr. Baron A. Mullis.

In March 2020 as the global COVID-19 pandemic surged First Church canceled all in-person activity, including Sunday church services. For the better part of a two years, services were held online and continue to this day in a hybrid format (both in person and online) to meet the needs of all church members.

On Sunday, October 23, 2022, First Church celebrated the 150th anniversary of the current church building at South 21st Street (Formerly Second Presbyterian Church).

In 2023, First Church hosted events throughout the year to celebrate the 325th anniversary of the mother church of Presbyterianism, within the United States, that began with the founding of First Presbyterian Church in the City of Philadelphia.

== Interior details ==
The interior of the church building has many fine design elements and admirable craftsmanship. The stone carvings were done in place from raw Ohio stone provided by William Armstrong of Philadelphia. Henry Augustus Sims traveled extensively in the area and noted exceptional work. The two stone carvers he recommended to the Church Building Committee were recent immigrants to America. They had come with letters of introduction and their first collaboration involved finishing the carvings in a small church in Delaware which Sims admired. Both men arrived from Great Britain and they left their distinctive marks on many American buildings. Alexander Milne Calder and John William Kitson spent nearly two years completing the interior, the exterior follies and the two elaborate doorway carvings. Calder's work attracted the attention of some important men in Philadelphia and led directly to his appointment as a carver for the Philadelphia City Hall project which was capped by Calder's famous statue of William Penn. The City Hall project consumed a good portion of Calder's working career, but he completed other noted works for tombs and commemorative statues, including one of General Meade now located in Fairmount Park. Kitson's work at Second Church established his reputation as an artist known for interior stonework and especially bird carving. He left Philadelphia and formed the New York City firm of Ellin and Kitson. Some of their later works there include the Tilden Home, the William Vanderbilt Home, The Equitable Insurance Building, Grace Church and Trinity Church.

== Publications ==
=== First Presbyterian Church ===
- The mother of us all: First Presbyterian Church in Philadelphia, 1698-1998 by Donald Roth Kocher. Written in celebration of the tercentenary of the church. Published in 1998.
- Our Legacy of Faith: The Art & Architecture of the First Presbyterian Church in Philadelphia by Michael B. Smith. Written in celebration of the 150th Anniversary of the church building and the 325th year of the congregation. Published in 2023.

==== First Presbyterian Church ====
===== Rev. Dr. John Ewing =====
- Sermons, by the Rev. John Ewing D. D: Later Pastor of the First Presbyterian Congregation in the City of Philadelphia by John Ewing selection by James P. Wilson. Published 1812. Republished 2020.

===== Rev. Dr. John Blair Linn =====
- Miscellaneous works, prose and poetical by John Blair Linn. Published 1795.
- Bourville Castle, or the Gallic Maidens by John Blair Linn. A play that premiered at John Street Theatre on January 16, 1797.
- The death of Washington. A poem. In imitation of the manner of Ossian by John Blair Linn. Published 1800
- A discourse occasioned by the death of the Reverend John Ewing, D.D. late senior pastor of the first Presbyterian Congregation of the city of Philadelphia and provost of the University of Pennsylvania. Published 1802.
- A letter to Joseph Priestley, L.L.D.F.R.S. &c. &c. in answer to his performance, entitled Socrates and Jesus compared by John Blair Linn. Published 1803.
- Valerian, a narrative poem: intended, in part, to describe, the early persecutions of Christians, and rapidly to illustrate the influence of Christianity on the manners of nations by John Blair Linn. Published 1805.

===== Rev. James Patriot Wilson =====
- Sermons, by the Rev. John Ewing D. D: Later Pastor of the First Presbyterian Congregation in the City of Philadelphia by John Ewing selection by James P. Wilson. Published 1812. Republished 2020.

===== Rev. Albert Barnes =====
- Notes, Explanatory and Practical, on the Epistle to the Romans by Albert Barnes. Published 1834.
- Scriptural Views of Slavery by Albert Barnes. Published 1846.
- The Way of Salvation by Albert Barnes. Published 1863.
- Life at Three-score: A Sermon Delivered in the First Presbyterian Church, Philadelphia, November 28, 1858 by Albert Barnes. Published 1864.

===== Rev. Dr. Herrick Johnson =====
- God's Ways Unsearchable": A Discourse on the Death of President Lincoln by Herrick Johnson.
- The Ideal Ministry by Herrick Johnson. Published 1908. Republished 2023.

===== Rev. Dr. Lawrence Maclay Colfelt, Sr. =====
- Life and Work of Dwight L. Moody: The Great Evangelist of the XIXth Century--The Founder of Northfield Seminary, Mount Herman School for Boys and the Chicago Bible Institute by Lawrence Maclay Colfelt and A.W. Williams. Published 1900.

===== Rev. Dr. Lewis Seymour Mudge, Sr. =====
- Manual for Church Officers and Members of the Government, Discipline, and Worship of the Presbyterian Church in the United States of America by Lewis Seymour Mudge and William P. Finney. Published 1926.

===== Rev. Dr. Baron A. Mullis =====
- Like a River Glorious by Baron Mullis. Published 2022.

==== Second Presbyterian Church ====
===== Rev. George Whitefield =====
- Sermons of George Whitefield by George Whitefield. Republished 2013.

===== Rev. Gilbert Tennant =====
- A Solemn Warning to the Secure World, From the God of Terrible Majesty: Or, the Presumptuous Sinner Detected, His Pleas Consider'd, and His Doom Display'd: Being an Essay, in which the Strong Proneness of Mankind to Entertain a False Confidence is Proved by Gilbert Tennant. Published 1735.

===== Rev. James Sproat =====
- A Discourse Occasioned by the Death of the Reverend George Whitefield, A.M. by James Sproat. Published 1771.

== Burials ==
=== First Presbyterian Church ===
First Church maintained a traditional burial ground adjoining the church on Bank Street (Market Street) and was finally closed in 1847. Of the 2,400 bodies in the burial ground 1,500 were reinterred directly in Laurel Hill Cemetery between 1847 and 1848. At this location there is a monument under a stairwell that marks the crypt where these remains were reinterred. In 1848, First Church reinterred 900 of the bodies that were removed from Bank Street (Market Street) in the burial lot next to Third Presbyterian Church (a.k.a. Old Pine Street Church). Families that opted to have their ancestors reinterred in a vault at Laurel Hill Cemetery were not allowed to bring the headstones with them; these were propped up against the walls down at "Old Pine." In the 1960s some of the tombstones were incorporated into the wall of the new Presbyterian Historical Society headquarters wall and others were propped nearby.

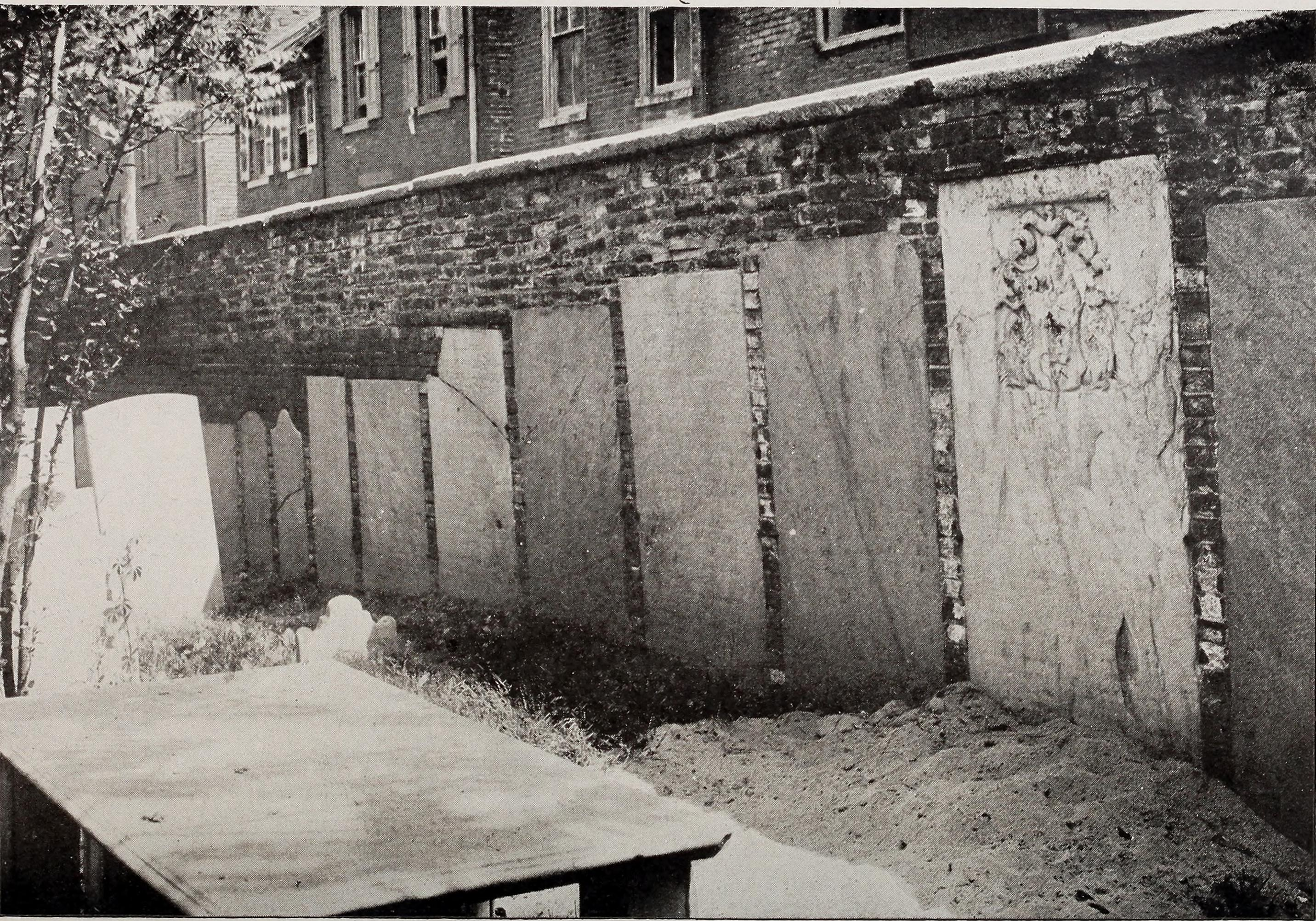
Remaining headstones from First Church original burial ground now housed at "Old Pine" burial ground and PHS headquarters.

=== Second Presbyterian Church ===
Second Church maintained a traditional burial ground located at Arch Street just above 5th Street, this cemetery was closed in 1867 and over 2500 burials were removed to Mount Vernon Cemetery.

While most of the remains were moved to Mount Vernon Cemetery, some were also re-located to Laurel Hill Cemetery. In the year 2000, while excavation occurred for the building of the National Constitution Center, approximately 90 more remains were found that were eventually re-located to Woodlands Cemetery.

=== Current ===
Currently, there is no traditional burial grounds maintained by the church. First Church in the late 2010s build a columbarium contained within the First Church property for disposition of cremated remains.

== Pastors ==
Pastors of The First Presbyterian Church in the City of Philadelphia (1698 to present)
No.	Portrait	Pastor (Called)	Years	Other Pastors (Supply, Interim, Associate, Student, etc.)
1		The Rev. Jedediah Andrews Spouse: Helena Andrews	1698–1746	The Rev. Samuel Hemphill (1734–1735); The Rev. Robert Cross (1739-about 1747)
2		The Rev. Robert Cross Spouse:	1747–1758	The Rev. Dr. Francis Alison (1752–1779)
3		The Rev. Dr. John Ewing Spouse: Hannah Sergeant Ewing	1759–1802	The Rev. Dr. Francis Alison (1752–1779); The Rev. Robert Davidson (1773-1784); The Rev. Dr. Samuel Miller (1798- ); The Rev. Dr. John Blair Linn
4		The Rev. Dr. John Blair Linn Spouse: Esther Bailey Linn Bleeker	1802–1804	
5		The Rev. Dr. James Patriot Wilson Spouse: Mary Hall Wilson (2nd), Elizabeth Woods Wilson (1st)	1806–1830	The Rev. Richard William Dickinson (1828-1829)
6		The Rev. Albert Barnes Spouse: Abigail Ann Smith Barnes	1830–1868	The Rev. George Washington Bethune (1834-1837); The Rev. Richard Salter Storrs Dickinson (1853-1855); The Rev. Samuel Penniman Leeds (1855-1857); The Rev. James Hervey Beale (1868)
7		The Rev. Dr. Herrick Johnson Spouse: Katherine Spencer Hardenburg Johnson	1868–1874	The Rev. Albert Barnes (1868–1870) Pastor Emeritus
8	Lawrence Maclay Colfelt (Ency. of the PCUSA, 1884)	The Rev. Dr. Lawrence MacLay Colfelt Sr. Spouse: Rebecca McManes Colfelt	1874–1884	The Rev. Daniel Hopkins Emerson (1878)
9		The Rev. Dr. George D. Baker Spouse: Gertrude Frelinghuysen Magie	1885–1904	The Rev. William John Brown Edgar (1893); The Rev. Sylvanus Rockafellow Queen (1896-1898); The Rev. Edward Yates Hill (1904)
10?		The Rev. Spouse:	1904-1939	The Rev. Albert Bigelow (1910-1911)
11?	Members of the Gen. Council of Presbyterian Churches call on Pres. Coolidge, March 18th. On the left of the Pres. is Dr. C.E. Macartney, Pres. General Assembly of (Presbyterian?) Churches LCCN2016894126	The Rev. Dr. Lewis Seymour Mudge Sr. Spouse: Ann Evelyn Bolton Mudge	1939–1945	
12?		The Rev. Spouse:	1945-?	
13?		The Rev. Spouse:	?-?	
14		The Rev. Dr. J. Ernest Somerville Spouse: Nan Telfer Somerville	1956–1986	
15		The Rev. Fergus A. Smith	1988–1998	The Rev. Peter C. S. Sime; The Rev. Barbara A. Chaapel (Valentine) (1998–
16		The Rev. Jesse B. Garner, III Spouse: Louise Allen Fauntleroy Jett Garner	2001–2018	The Rev. Barbara A. Chaapel (Valentine) (1998–; The Rev. Kenneth J. Ross; The Rev. Dr. Herbert D. Valentine; The Rev. Mindy Huffstetler Campbell (2002–2015); The Rev. Andrew "Drew" Harrison (2015–2017); The Rev. Megan LeCluyse (2018–2023); The Rev. Dr. Baron A. Mullis (2018) Transition
17		The Rev. Dr. Baron Anthony Mullis Spouse: Herman Lester Morris, III	2018–present	The Rev. Barbara A. Chaapel (Valentine) (1998–; The Rev. Kenneth J. Ross; The Rev. Dr. Herbert D. Valentine; The Rev. Megan LeCluyse (2018–2023); The Rev. Sarah Glass Weisiger (2019–2020); The Rev. Jerry Kay Foote (Hodgkinson) (2019–2024); The Rev. Cynthia "Cindy" Jarvis (2021–; The Rev. Laura Colee (Zrinsky) (2023–; The Rev. Matthew Arlyck (2024–

Pastors of The Second Presbyterian Church in the City of Philadelphia (1743 to 1949)
No.	Portrait	Pastor (Called)	Years	Other Pastors (Supply, Interim, Associate, Student, etc.)
1		The Rev. George Whitefield Spouse: Elizabeth Gwynne James Whitefield	Founder, Pre-1743	
2		The Rev. Gilbert Tennent Spouse: Sarah Spofford Tennent (3rd), Cornelia de Peyster Clarkson Tennent (2nd), unknown (1st)	1743–1764	
3		The Rev. John Murray Spouse: Judith Sargent Murray	1765–1769	
4		The Rev. James Sproat Spouse: Sarah Smith Sproat	1769–1787	
5		The Rev. Dr. Ashbel Green Spouse: Christina Anderson Green (2nd), Elizabeth Stockton Green (1st)	1787–1794	
6		The Rev. John Neilson Abeel Spouse: Molly Stille Abeel	1794–1799	
7		The Rev. Dr. Jacob Jones Janeway Spouse: Martha Gray Leiper Janeway	1799–1813	
8		The Rev. Dr. Thomas Harvey Skinner Spouse: Frances Louisa Davenport Skinner (2nd), Emily Montgomery Skinner (1st)	1813–1828	
9		The Rev. Joseph Sanford Spouse: Anna Jackson Sanford	1828–1834	
10		The Rev. Dr. Cornelius C. Cuyler Spouse: Eleanor de Graaf Cuyler	1834–1850	
11		The Rev. Charles Woodruff Shields Spouse: Elizabeth Kane Shields (2nd), Charolette Elizabeth Bain Shields (1st)	1850–1865	
12		The Rev. Elias Root Beadle Spouse: Hannah Jones Beadle	1865–1878	
		The Rev. Alexander MacCole Spouse: Grant Haley Craig MacCole	1911–1949	

Pastors of Calvary Presbyterian Church in the City of Philadelphia (1853 to 1929)
No.	Portrait	Pastor (Called)	Years	Other Pastors (Supply, Interim, Associate, Student, etc.)
1		The Rev. Dr. John Jenkins Spouse: Louisa Mary MacLennan Jenkins (2nd), Harriet Shepstone Jenkins (1st)	1853–1863	
2		The Rev. Dr. Phineas Wolcott Calkins Spouse: Charlotte Grosvenor Whiton Calkins	1864–1866	
3		The Rev. Dr. Zephaniah Moore Humphrey Spouse: Harriette L. Sykes Humphrey	1868–1875	
4		The Rev. Dr. Charles Andrew Dickey Spouse: Katherine Donnell Dickey	1875–1893	
5		The Rev. Dr. John Sparhawk Jones Spouse: Harriet Sterett Winchester Jones	1894–1910	
		The Rev. Clarence Shannon Long Spouse: Laura Amelia Baker Long	1914–1915	

=== Notable members ===
Some notable members have included:

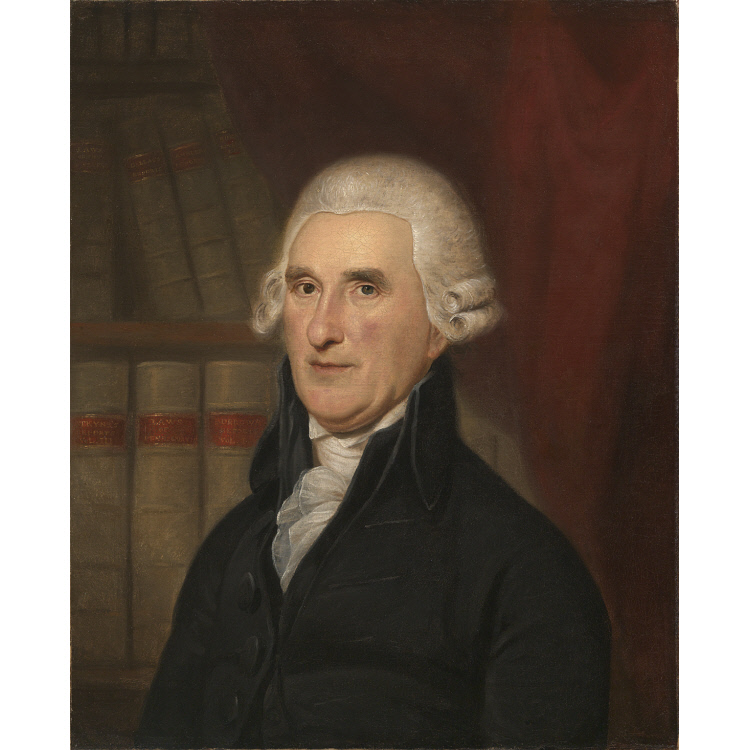
Thomas McKean portrait by Charles Willson Peale

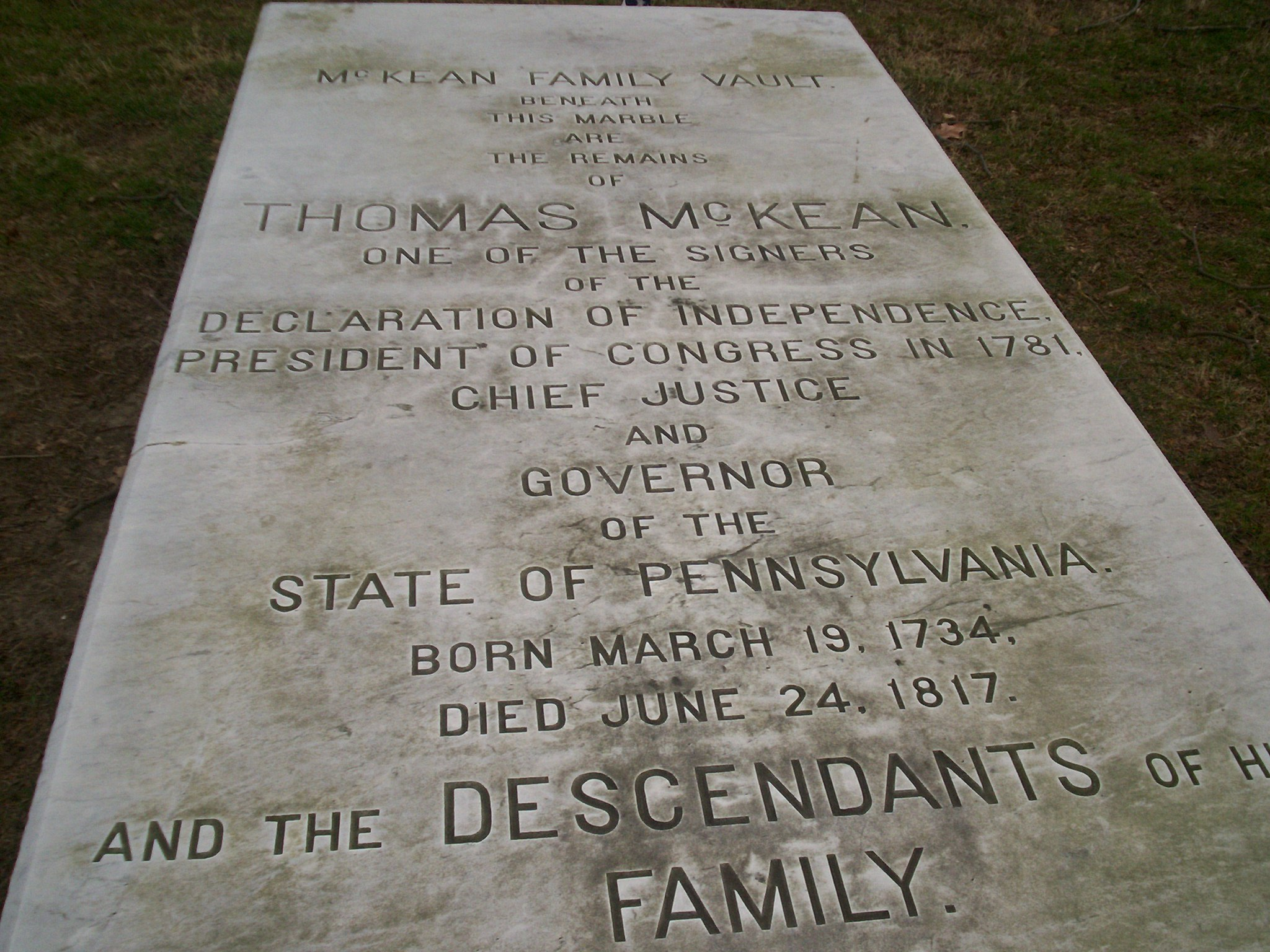
Thomas McKean Grave

- Thomas McKean, Esq. was an American lawyer, politician, and Founding Father. During the American Revolution, he was a Delaware delegate to the Continental Congress in Philadelphia, where he signed the Continental Association, the Declaration of Independence, and the Articles of Confederation. McKean served as a President of Congress. He was originally buried in First Church's cemetery but when that closed his family vault was relocated to Laurel Hill Cemetery nearby.
- The Rev. Dr. Herbert D. Valentine, Moderator of the General Assembly of the Presbyterian Church (USA) 203rd General Assembly. With a long career in the Presbytery of Baltimore behind him, Valentine retired to Philadelphia and joined his wife the Rev. Barbara A. Chaapel (Valentine), as an active member of First Church, both serving as Associate Pastors. A tribute to his career was recognized by the United States Congress in the year 2000.

== Archival collections ==
The Presbyterian Historical Society has a collection of miscellaneous items dealing with the development and growth of the First Presbyterian Church. The materials at the historical society include session minutes, correspondence, baptism and marriage records, pew rentals, cemetery information, cash books, as well as other items related to the history and business of the church.
