= Lehigh Division =

Freight rail line

Overview
- Owner: Reading Blue Mountain and Northern Railroad (was Conrail)
- Termini: Lehighton, Pennsylvania, U.S.; Dupont, Pennsylvania, U.S.

Service
- System: Reading Blue Mountain and Northern Railroad (was Conrail), includes Norfolk Southern Railway and Canadian Pacific Railway trackage rights
- Operator: Reading Blue Mountain and Northern Railroad (was Conrail)

History
- Opened: 1993; 33 years ago (spin off from the Lehigh Line, officially the former main line of the Lehigh Valley Railroad with former Central Railroad of New Jersey main line trackage and former Lehigh and Susquehanna Railroad main line trackage)

Technical
- Track gauge: 1,435 mm (4 ft 8 1/2 in) standard gauge

The Lehigh Division is a major freight low grade rail line owned and operated by the Reading Blue Mountain and Northern Railroad in the U.S. state of Pennsylvania that runs from Lehighton, Pennsylvania to Dupont, Pennsylvania; it originally ran from Lehighton to Mehoopany, Pennsylvania. The Lehigh Division was formed in 1993 by Conrail from the Lehigh Line, officially the former main line of the Lehigh Valley Railroad (LVRR) that has absorbed former Central Railroad of New Jersey (CNJ) main line trackage and former Lehigh and Susquehanna Railroad (L&S) main line trackage into its system under Conrail; the Lehigh Line today is owned by the Norfolk Southern Railway and connects to the Lehigh Division at Lehighton.

The Lehigh Division currently inherits the Lehigh Line's original trackage and Mountain Cutoff trackage between Lehighton, Pennsylvania and White Haven, Pennsylvania which includes the right track from Lehighton to Penn Haven Junction, also known as Old Penn Haven or M&H Junction, in Lehigh Township, Carbon County, Pennsylvania and between Laurel Run, Pennsylvania to Dupont, Pennsylvania, which was from the Lehigh Valley Railroad and the Lehigh Line's new trackage between White Haven and Laurel Run that was from the former Lehigh and Susquehanna Railroad's main line which dates back to acts of legislature in 1837 under the sponsorship of the Pennsylvania Canal Commission.

The Lehigh and Susquehanna Railroad, including its trackage and yards, was leased to the Central Railroad of New Jersey from 1876-1976. The Lehigh Division inherited the Lehigh Line's original trackage between Dupont and Mehoopany, Pennsylvania. The majority of the Lehigh Division runs along the upper or Grand division of the historic Lehigh Canal.

Conrail sold the three-year-old Lehigh Division to the Reading Blue Mountain and Northern Railroad in 1996.

During the 2000s, the Reading Blue Mountain and Northern shortened the line from Mehoopany to Dupont, the tracks from Mehoopany to Dupont are still owned by Reading Blue Mountain and Northern, but it is now called the Susquehanna Branch. The Susquehanna Branch inherited original Lehigh Division trackage from Dupont to Mehoopany which is also Lehigh Line original trackage and Lehigh Line Mountain Cutoff trackage. The Norfolk Southern Railway and the Canadian Pacific Railway have trackage rights south of Dupont, Pennsylvania on the Lehigh Division.

The Lehigh Division is one of the two main branch lines of the Reading Blue Mountain and Northern, the other is the Reading Division. The combined operations of the Lehigh Division and the Reading Division is labeled “Reading Blue Mountain and Northern main line”.

== History ==
=== Background ===
The Lehigh Division was formed in 1993 by Conrail and it was once part of the Lehigh Line. The Lehigh Line is officially the former main line of the Lehigh Valley Railroad that has absorbed former Central Railroad of New Jersey main line trackage and former Lehigh and Susquehanna Railroad main line trackage into its system under Conrail. The Lehigh Line was established in 1855 between Easton, Pennsylvania and Allentown, Pennsylvania, which is the Lehigh Line's original route; the Lehigh Line still has its original route from Easton to Allentown but only retained the majority of its original right of way of its original route which is from Easton to Bethlehem, Pennsylvania. The Lehigh Line is historically called the Lehigh Valley Mainline and it is now owned by the Norfolk Southern Railway and before that Conrail.

The Central Railroad of New Jersey, which leased the Lehigh and Susquehanna Railroad, and Lehigh Valley Railroad began to work together in 1965 to eliminate redundant trackage in the area. This end up being the first step towards the reconfiguration of the Lehigh Line with former Lehigh and Susquehanna Railroad main line trackage. The Lehigh Valley Railroad, the Central Railroad of New Jersey and the Lehigh and Susquehanna Railroad were taken over by Conrail and Conrail merged what was left of the Lehigh and Susquehanna Railroad main line into the Lehigh Line to replace original Lehigh Line trackage in the area.

Under Conrail, the Lehigh Division inherited the Lehigh Line's original trackage between Lehighton, Pennsylvania and White Haven, Pennsylvania which includes the right track from Lehighton to Penn Haven Junction, also known as Old Penn Haven or M&H Junction, in Lehigh Township, Carbon County, Pennsylvania which was from the Lehigh Valley Railroad, the Lehigh Line's Mountain Cutoff trackage between Laurel Run, Pennsylvania to Duryea, Pennsylvania, which was also from the Lehigh Valley Railroad and the Lehigh Line's new trackage between White Haven and Laurel Run that was from the former Lehigh and Susquehanna Railroad's main line which dates back to acts of legislature in 1837 under the sponsorship of the Pennsylvania Canal Commission.

Conrail sold the three-year-old Lehigh Division to the Reading Blue Mountain and Northern Railroad in 1996. During the 2000s, the Reading Blue Mountain and Northern Railroad shortened the line from Mehoopany to Dupont. The Lehigh Division's tracks from Mehoopany to Dupont were separated from the Lehigh Division and became a new rail line called the Susquehanna Branch. The Susquehanna Branch inherited original Lehigh Division trackage from Dupont to Mehoopany which is also Lehigh Line original trackage and Mountain Cutoff trackage and it is still owned by Reading Blue Mountain and Northern Railroad.

Today, the Norfolk Southern Railway, which owns the Lehigh Line, and the Canadian Pacific Railway has trackage rights on the Lehigh Division south of Dupont, Pennsylvania.

=== Former Lehigh Valley Railroad trackage/former Lehigh Line original trackage ===
The Lehigh Division's Lehigh Valley Railroad trackage which was represented as Lehigh Line original trackage at one time began with the Beaver Meadow Railroad and Coal Company and the Penn Haven and White Haven Railroad and later included Lehigh Valley Railroad built trackage.

From Jim Thorpe, Pennsylvania to Beaver Meadows, Pennsylvania, the Beaver Meadow Railroad and Coal Company opened its line in 1836 and it was a double tracked line. The Beaver Meadow was taken over by the Lehigh Valley Railroad and the line from Jim Thorpe to Penn Haven Junction in Lehigh Township, Carbon County, Pennsylvania became part of the Lehigh Line; the line from Penn Haven Junction to Beaver Meadows became a branch line and today it is called the Ashmore Secondary, now owned by Norfolk Southern Railway. The Lehigh Division inherited the right track from Jim Thorpe to Penn Haven Junction from the Lehigh Line which included the Lehigh Valley Railroad built right track from Jim Thorpe to Lehighton, Pennsylvania. The Lehigh Division inherited the right track from Lehighton to Jim Thorpe from the Lehigh Line including the right track from Jim Thorpe to Penn Haven Junction; the right track was built by the Lehigh Valley Railroad and opened in 1855.

From Penn Haven Junction to White Haven, Pennsylvania, the Penn Haven and White Haven Railroad opened its line in the early 1860s. The Lehigh Valley Railroad acquired the Penn Haven and White Haven in 1864 and was merged into the Lehigh Line. The Lehigh Division inherited the Penn Haven Junction to White Haven trackage from Lehigh Line.

From Laurel Run, Pennsylvania to Dupont, Pennsylvania, the line was built by the Lehigh Valley Railroad in November 1888 and it was called the Mountain Cut-Off. The Mountain Cut-Off was absorbed into the Lehigh Line to replace its old trackage from Solomons Gap to Duryea during Conrail. The Mountain Cut-Off was actually built between Solomons Gap, Pennsylvania to Duryea, Pennsylvania. The Cut-Off from Solomons Gap to Laurel Run was abandoned and from Dupont to Duryea, this part of the Cut-Off is now part of the Susquehanna Branch; the Cut-Off part from Dupont to Duryea was part of the Lehigh Division at one time but the Lehigh Division's trackage from Dupont to Mehoopany, Pennsylvania was separated from the Lehigh Division and became the Susquehanna Branch which includes the Cut-Off from Dupont to Duryea.

The tracks passed Dupont to Mehoopany which was once part of the Lehigh Division and before that the Lehigh Line, is now the current day Susquehanna Branch. After a short piece between Duryea and Pittston Junction in Pittston, Pennsylvania, the Susquehanna Branch returns from the Mountain Cut-Off piece that was once part of both the Lehigh Division and the Lehigh Line to the old part of the Lehigh Line which was also part of the Lehigh Division at one time from Pittston Junction to Mehoopany, opened in 1868 as part of the Pennsylvania and New York Canal and Railroad.

=== Former Lehigh and Susquehanna Railroad trackage/former Lehigh Line new trackage ===
The Lehigh Division's White Haven, Pennsylvania to Laurel Run, Pennsylvania trackage which was represented as Lehigh Line new trackage at one time was built by the Lehigh and Susquehanna Railroad. This Lehigh and Susquehanna trackage is combined trackage from what is left of the Lehigh and Susquehanna's first rail line, White Haven to Solomon Gap and what is left of the Lehigh and Susquehanna's backtrack rail line from Solomon Gap to Laurel Run.

The Lehigh and Susquehanna Railroad opened its first rail line in 1843 from White Haven to Wilkes-Barre, Pennsylvania; the White Haven to Solomon Gap segment is what is left of the Lehigh and Susquehanna's first rail line, now part of the Lehigh Division and originally part of the Lehigh and Susquehanna main line and then the Lehigh Line.

The Lehigh and Susquehanna Railroad opened the backtrack from Solomon Gap to Ashley, Pennsylvania in 1867; the Solomon Gap to Laurel Run segment is what is left of the Lehigh and Susquehanna's Back-Track, now part of the Lehigh Division and originally part of the Lehigh and Susquehanna main line and then the Lehigh Line.

== Trackage ==
=== Background ===
The Lehigh Division runs from Packerton Yard interchange with the Norfolk Southern Railway's Lehigh Line in Lehighton, Pennsylvania, the southern terminus just south of Jim Thorpe, Pennsylvania, and the Lehigh Gorge to an interchange with the Norfolk Southern Railway Sunbury Line and the Reading Blue Mountain and Northern Susquehanna Branch in Dupont, Pennsylvania, the northern terminus.

From the Certain Teed Corporation plant in Mountain Top, Pennsylvania to CPR/NS junction in Dupont, Pennsylvania, the line is double tracked. Throughout the line's route, the Lehigh Division travels along the Lehigh River and shares a small portion of its right of way with the Norfolk Southern Railway Lehigh Line which it was originally part of.

The Lehigh Division is one of the two primary main branch lines of the Reading Blue Mountain and Northern, the other is the Reading Division. The Lehigh Division doesn't connect with the Reading Division, but Reading Blue Mountain and Northern operations on both the Lehigh Division and the Reading Division including the Jim Thorpe, Pennsylvania Nesquehoning Junction connector track and the Susquehanna Branch's Dupont to Duryea Yard, near Pittston, Pennsylvania) trackage, which was once part of the Lehigh Division, is labeled “Reading Blue Mountain and Northern main line”.

=== Former Lehigh Valley Railroad trackage/former Lehigh Line original trackage between Lehighton and White Haven ===
==== Lehighton to Penn Haven Junction ====
Along the line's route, between Packerton Yard in Lehighton and Penn Haven Junction, also known as Old Penn Haven or M&H Junction) in Lehigh Township, Carbon County, Pennsylvania, the Lehigh Division shares the right of way with the Norfolk Southern Railway's Lehigh Line; both the Lehigh Division and the Lehigh Line using the same right of way travel along both banks of the Lehigh River from Lehighton, passing through Packerton Junction on the left bank, where R&N's Reading Division connects to the Lehigh Line only, and then the Lehigh Gorge also on the left bank to Lehigh Township.

The reason why the Lehigh Division shares the same right of way with the Lehigh Line, is because the Lehigh Division was once part of the Lehigh Line. The Lehigh Line is the former main line of the Lehigh Valley Railroad that has absorbed a portion of the Lehigh and Susquehanna Railroad main line to replace some of its obsolete trackage, and the Lehigh Line was allowed to continue as the former main line of the Lehigh Valley Railroad.

==== Penn Haven Junction to White Haven ====
Past Penn Haven Junction, only the Lehigh Division continues as the Lehigh Line stops at Penn Haven Junction; the Lehigh Line did continue past Penn Haven Junction at one time but the tracks past the junction is now represented as the Lehigh Division. Past Penn Haven Junction, the Lehigh Division crosses the Lehigh River, which crosses the river twice with the Lehigh Line before that, and continues on the right bank of the river until it gets to White Haven, Pennsylvania.

At White Haven, the Lehigh Division joins with its former Lehigh and Susquehanna Railroad (L&S) trackage that was once part of the Lehigh and Susquehanna Railroad main line and the Lehigh Line; when the L&S main line trackage was part of the Lehigh Line, it was represented as the Lehigh Line's new trackage.

=== Former Lehigh and Susquehanna Railroad (main line) trackage/former Lehigh Line new trackage between White Haven and Laurel Run ===
Past White Haven, the Lehigh Division continues on those former Lehigh and Susquehanna Railroad trackage, which was once part of the Lehigh and Susquehanna Railroad main line and the Lehigh Line, until it gets to Laurel Run.

Between White Haven and Laurel Run, the Lehigh Division travels the long climb up along the middle elevations of Penobscot Knob, which looms above the yard, passing through Mountain Top, Pennsylvania while climbing up the Penobscot Knob's middle elevations; the Lehigh Division descends after the long climb of Penobscot Knob's middle elevations to Laurel Run, where the line joins with its former Lehigh Valley Railroad trackage/former Lehigh Line original trackage.

=== Former Lehigh Valley Railroad trackage/former Lehigh Line Mountain Cutoff trackage between Laurel Run and Dupont ===
Past Laurel Run, Pennsylvania, the Lehigh Division uses its former Lehigh Valley Railroad trackage/former Lehigh Line Mountain Cutoff trackage to its end point at CPR/NS junction just west of 207 Coolidge Street in Dupont, Pennsylvania. From Laurel Run, the Lehigh Division continues the descent after the long climb of Penobscot Knob's middle elevations before Laurel Run.

=== Previous Lehigh Division trackage, the Susquehanna Branch ===
The Lehigh Division used to continue past Dupont, Pennsylvania all the way to Mehoopany, Pennsylvania. However, the railroad separated the tracks past Dupont from the Lehigh Division and designated those tracks as a new rail line called the Susquehanna Branch. The Susquehanna Branch is not just former Lehigh Division original trackage, it is also former Lehigh Line original trackage and former Lehigh Line Mountain Cutoff trackage, all built by the Lehigh Valley Railroad.

At Dupont, the line's south end on the Susquehanna Branch, descending traffic can switch northeast to the Taylor Yard in Taylor, Pennsylvania (NS), or cross west beyond I-81 and US 11 to traverse the descent from Dupont, Avoca, Pennsylvania below the Airport and I-81 and alongside the steep descent along Railroad Street in Duryea, Pennsylvania through the Duryea Yard near Pittston, Pennsylvania along, then up river on the former Lehigh Valley Railroad/Lehigh Line trackage to Mehoopany about half-way to Sayre, Pennsylvania.

At Mehoopany, the line's northern end, the Susquehanna Branch, interchanges with the Norfolk Southern Railway Lehigh Secondary, its beginning, which runs from Mehoopany to Sayre and it is also former Lehigh Valley Railroad trackage/former Lehigh Line original trackage. The Lehigh Secondary is leased to the Lehigh Railway and it connects to the Norfolk Southern Railway Southern Tier Line at the Sayre Yard in Sayre. The Southern Tier Line helps bring trains to freight stops in the New York state and to the Great Lakes.
