= Lehigh Township, Pennsylvania =

Lehigh Township is the name of some places in the U.S. state of Pennsylvania:

- Lehigh Township, Carbon County, Pennsylvania
- Lehigh Township, Lackawanna County, Pennsylvania, now Thornhurst Township
- Lehigh Township, Northampton County, Pennsylvania
- Lehigh Township, Wayne County, Pennsylvania
