= Lehigh Line (Norfolk Southern) =

Railroad line in central New Jersey and northeastern Pennsylvania

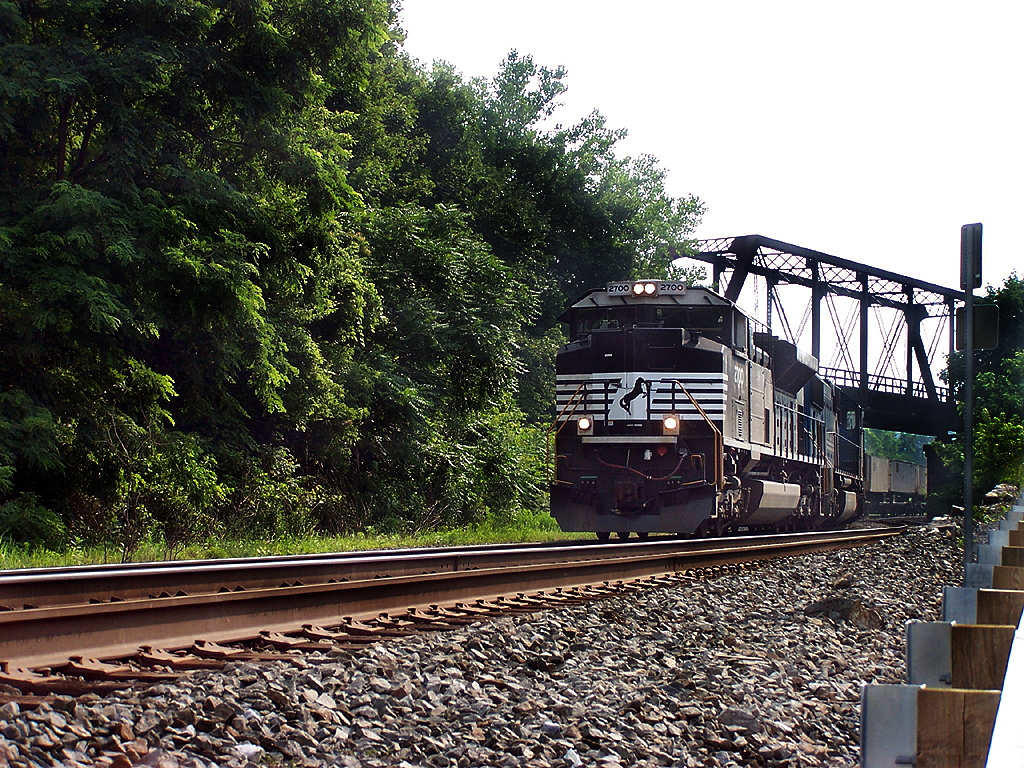
- A Norfolk Southern Railway train on the Lehigh Line in Easton, Pennsylvania in October 2006

Overview
- Status: Operational
- Owner: Norfolk Southern Railway (1999–present); Conrail (1976–1999); Lehigh Valley Railroad (1855–1976)
- Locale: New Jersey and Pennsylvania, U.S.
- Termini: Port Reading Junction in Manville, New Jersey; Penn Haven Junction in Lehigh Township, Pennsylvania

Service
- Type: Freight rail
- System: Norfolk Southern Railway

History
- Opened: June 11, 1855

Technical
- Number of tracks: 1-2
- Track gauge: 1,435 mm (4 ft 8 1/2 in) standard gauge
- Operating speed: 50 miles per hour (80.5 km/h)

The Lehigh Line is a railroad line in Central New Jersey, Northeastern Pennsylvania, and the Lehigh Valley region of eastern Pennsylvania. It is owned and operated by the Norfolk Southern Railway. The line runs west from the vicinity of the Port of New York and New Jersey in Manville, New Jersey via Conrail's Lehigh Line to the southern end of Wyoming Valley's Coal Region in Lehigh Township, Pennsylvania.

The railroad is part of both Norfolk Southern's Keystone Division and the Crescent Corridor. As of 2021 the line is freight-only, although there are perennial proposals to restore passenger service over all or part of the line.

The Lehigh Line hosts approximately twenty-five trains per day. The line runs from Port Reading Junction in Manville, New Jersey to Penn Haven Junction in Lehigh Township, Pennsylvania. At Port Reading Junction, it meets the Trenton Subdivision. It crosses the Delaware River at Phillipsburg, New Jersey. Most of the traffic along the line consists of intermodal and general merchandise trains going to yards.

== History ==
=== 19th century ===
The majority of the line was once the main line of the Lehigh Valley Railroad. The first segment, which runs between Easton and Allentown, opened in September 1855. Later extensions and corporate acquisitions carried the Lehigh Valley main line to Buffalo, New York to the west and Perth Amboy, New Jersey to the east. Some portions of the line were constructed by the Lehigh and Susquehanna Railroad (L&S). Conceived as a competitor to the Lehigh Valley, the L&S constructed a parallel line on the north side of the Lehigh River. The line opened in 1868 and was soon leased by the Central Railroad of New Jersey (CNJ).

Passenger service ended on the Lehigh Valley in 1961. The Lehigh Valley assumed the lease of the L&S from the CNJ in 1972 when the latter abandoned operations in Pennsylvania. Both the Lehigh Valley and CNJ were merged into Conrail in 1976. Conrail retained the ex-Lehigh Valley main line and named it the Lehigh Line. Conrail combined the Bethlehem–Allentown portion of the Lehigh Valley main line with the ex-Reading Company Reading Line; the Lehigh Line now uses the former L&S route between those two cities. In the 1980s Conrail abandoned the ex-Lehigh Valley bridge over the Delaware River at Phillipsburg, New Jersey in favor of the L&S/CNJ bridge.

With the line integrating former Lehigh and Susquehanna Railroad-owned CNJ Pennsylvania leased main line trackage into both its original route and into its route between Allentown and Lehighton, Conrail integrated other CNJ trackage, owned by CNJ itself, around Phillipsburg into the line so the line's Lehigh Valley trackage in Phillipsburg and the line's new CNJ trackage in Phillipsburg are part of the line. This lasted until the mid to late 1980s when Conrail decided to close and abandon the line's Lehigh Valley Phillipsburg trackage, which includes the Lehigh Valley Phillipsburg bridge, due to the Lehigh Valley Phillipsburg bridge needing repairs, in favor of using the CNJ Phillipsburg trackage full-time including the CNJ Phillipsburg bridge, which is more stable than the Lehigh Valley Phillipsburg bridge.

The Norfolk Southern acquired the Lehigh Line in 1999 in the Conrail split with CSX Transportation. The New Jersey section from Manville to Newark was spun off into Conrail Shared Assets Operations Lehigh Line, allowing for equal competition between Norfolk Southern and CSX.

==== Lehigh Valley Railroad ====
The Lehigh Valley Railroad system with the Lehigh Line as it appeared under Lehigh Valley Railroad ownership in bold black and the branch lines in non bold black

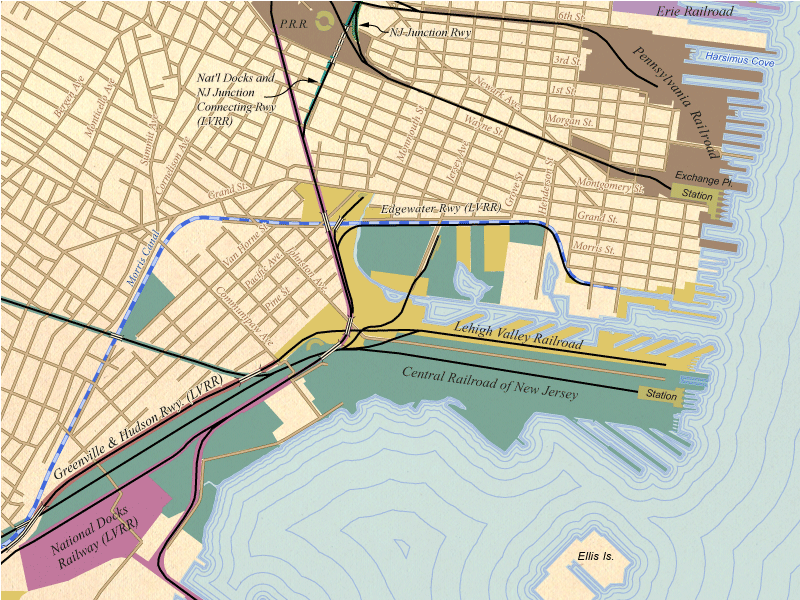
A map of the Jersey City terminal

A map of the Roselle and South Plainfield Railway

A map of the Easton and Amboy Railroad

The Lehigh Valley Railroad incorporated on April 21, 1846. Funding problems delayed the company's growth, and it was not until late 1852 that the company, under newly appointed chief engineer Robert H. Sayre, surveyed the route between Mauch Chunk and Easton. The company changed its name to the Lehigh Valley Railroad on January 7, 1853. The line opened between Easton and Allentown on June 11, 1855, and west to Mauch Chunk on September 12.

At Easton, the Lehigh Valley constructed an unusual double-decker bridge across the Delaware River to Phillipsburg. The upper level proceeded to connect with the Central Railroad of New Jersey and Morris Canal while the lower level curved south to meet the Belvidere Delaware Railroad. This bridge enabled the Lehigh Valley to interchange coal for both the New York City and Philadelphia markets, respectively. The upper level opened on September 7; the lower level in late December.

The length of the line from Jim Thorpe to Easton, which included the line's original route from Easton to Allentown was 46 miles of single track. The line was laid with a rail weighing 56 pounds per yard supported upon cross ties 6 x 7 inches and 7-1/2 feet long placed two feet apart with about a quarter of it ballasted with stone or gravel. The line had a descending or level grade from Jim Thorpe to Easton and, with the exception of the curve at Jim Thorpe, had no curve less than a 700 feet radius.

==== Expansion to New York state ====
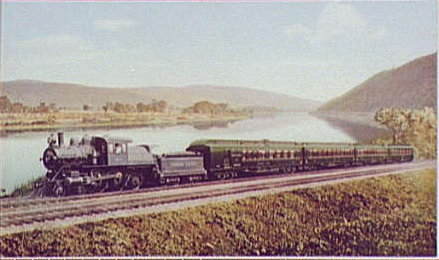
The LV's Black Diamond in 1898

In the 1860s, LV expanded the line northward to the Wilkes-Barre, Pennsylvania area and up the Susquehanna River to the New York state line.

In 1864, the LV began acquiring feeder railroads and merging them into its system. The first acquisitions were the Beaver Meadow Railroad and Coal Company, which included a few hundred acres of coal land, and the Penn Haven and White Haven Railroad. The purchase of the Penn Haven and White Haven was the first step in expanding to Wilkes-Barre, Pennsylvania. To reach Wilkes-Barre, the LV began constructing an extension from White Haven, Pennsylvania to Wilkes-Barre. The Penn Haven and White Haven Railroad allowed the LV to reach White Haven.

In 1866, the LV acquired the Lehigh and Mahanoy Railroad, originally the Quakake Railroad, and the North Branch Canal along the Susquehanna River, renaming it the Pennsylvania and New York Canal & Railroad Company (P&NY). The purchasing of the North Branch Canal saw an opportunity for a near-monopoly in the region north of the Wyoming Valley. In 1866, two years after the purchase of the Penn Haven and White Haven, the extension from White Haven to Wilkes-Barre opened.

Construction of a rail line to the New York state line started immediately, and in 1867 the line was complete from Wilkes-Barre to Waverly, New York, where coal was transferred to the broad-gauge Erie Railroad and shipped to western markets through Buffalo, New York. To reach Wilkes-Barre, the LV purchased the Penn Haven and White Haven Railroad in 1864, and began constructing an extension from White Haven to Wilkes-Barre that was opened in 1867. By 1869, the LVRR owned a continuous track through Pennsylvania from Easton to Waverly.

In the following year, the Lehigh Valley, a standard gauge railroad, completed arrangements with the Erie Railroad, at that time having a six-foot gauge, for a third rail within its tracks to enable LV equipment to run through to Elmira and later to Buffalo.

In the 1870s, the LV was extended further, following its acquisition of other large tracts of land starting at 13,000 acres (53 km^{2}) in 1870, with an additional of 5,800 acres (23 km^{2}) in 1872, as it sought to expand into New Jersey and New York City. In 1870, the Lehigh Valley Railroad acquired trackage rights to Auburn, New York on the Southern Central Railroad.

In 1872, the Lehigh Valley Railroad purchased the dormant charter of the Perth Amboy and Bound Brook Railroad which had access to the Perth Amboy, New Jersey harbor, and added to it a new charter, the Bound Brook and Easton Railroad. The state of New Jersey passed legislation that allowed the LV to consolidate its New Jersey railroads into one company; the Perth Amboy and Bound Brook and the Bound Brook and Easton were merged to form a new railroad company called the Easton and Amboy Railroad (or Easton & Amboy Railroad Company).

The Easton and Amboy Railroad was a railroad built across central New Jersey by the Lehigh Valley Railroad from Phillipsburg, New Jersey to Bound Brook, New Jersey to connect the Lehigh Valley Railroad coal hauling operations in Pennsylvania with the Port of New York and New Jersey to serve consumer markets in the New York metropolitan area, eliminating the Phillipsburg connection with the CNJ that had previously been the only LV access to the New York tidewater. Until it was built, the terminus of the LV had been at Phillipsburg, New Jersey, on the Delaware River opposite Easton, Pennsylvania. The Easton and Amboy was used as a connection to the New York metropolitan area, with a terminus in Jersey City, New Jersey.

Construction commenced in 1872 as soon the Easton and Amboy was formed; coal docks at Perth Amboy were soon constructed, and most of the line's new expanded New Jersey route from Easton to Perth Amboy was graded and rails laid. However, the route required building a wooden bridge over the Delaware River to connect Easton with Phillipsburg, New Jersey, and building a 4,893-foot (1,491 m) tunnel through/under Musconetcong Mountain near Pattenburg, New Jersey, about twelve miles east of Phillipsburg, and that proved troublesome.

The tunnel delayed the opening of the Easton and Amboy part of the line until May 1875, when a coal train first passed over the line. To support the anticipated increase in train traffic, the wooden bridge over the Delaware River in Easton was replaced by a double-tracked, 1,191-foot (363 m) iron bridge.

At Perth Amboy, a tidewater terminal was built on the Arthur Kill comprising a large coal dock used to transport coal into New York City. These tracks were laid and the Easton and Amboy Railroad was opened for business on June 28, 1875, for hauling coal. The Easton and Amboy's operations were labeled the "New Jersey Division" of the Lehigh Valley Railroad. The Easton and Amboy had already completed large docks and facilities for shipping coal at Perth Amboy upon an extensive tract of land fronting the Arthur Kill. Approximately 350,000 tons of anthracite moved to Perth Amboy during that year for transshipment by water. Operations continued until the LV's bankruptcy in 1976. The marshalling yard is now the residential area known as Harbortown.

Passenger traffic on the LV's Easton and Amboy connected with the Pennsylvania Railroad (PRR) at Metuchen, New Jersey and continued to the PRR'S Exchange Place terminus in Jersey City (that connection was discontinued in 1891 after the LV established its own route to Jersey City from South Plainfield).

The Easton and Amboy Railroad was ultimately absorbed into the parent Lehigh Valley Railroad.

The route which was constructed by the LV's Easton and Amboy still exists, but the rail line now stops at Manville, New Jersey. Past Manville, the route continues as a new rail line. The route from Manville to Perth Amboy (now Manville to Newark, New Jersey) was separated into a new rail line in 1999; the route from Manville to Easton continued as the original line. The Lehigh Line's Manville to Easton route is most popular among railfans; the Lehigh Line's original route from Easton to Allentown is the second-most popular.

In 1875, the LV financed the addition of a third track to the Erie Railroad main line so that cars could roll directly from colliery to the port at Buffalo. While the third track on the Erie Railroad main line between Waverly and Buffalo gave the LV an unbroken connection to Buffalo, the road's management desired its own line into Buffalo. The Geneva, Ithaca and Athens Railroad passed into the hands of the LV in September 1876, which extended from the New York state line near Sayre, Pennsylvania, to Geneva, New York, a distance of 75 miles.

In 1882, the LV began an extensive expansion into New York, Waverly, New York to Buffalo, New York. Construction from Waverly to Buffalo was split into two projects, Waverly to Geneva, New York and Geneva, located at the northern end of Seneca Lake, to Buffalo Geneva. First, it purchased a large parcel of land in Buffalo, the Tifft farm, for use as terminal facilities, and obtained a New York charter for the Lehigh Valley Railway, a similar name to the LVRR, but with "railway" instead). LVRR subsidiary, the Lehigh Valley Railway, began constructing the main line's northern part from Buffalo to Lancaster, New York in 1883, a total distance of ten miles. This was the second step toward establishment of a direct route from Waverly to Buffalo, the first being the acquisition of the Geneva, Ithaca and Athens Railroad.

In 1887, the Lehigh Valley Railroad obtained a lease on the Southern Central Railroad (the LV previously had trackage rights on the railroad starting in 1870), which had a route from Waverly northward into the Finger Lakes region. At the same time, the LVRR organized the Buffalo and Geneva Railroad to build the rest of the 97-mile Geneva to Buffalo trackage, from Geneva to Lancaster. Finally, in 1889, the LV gained control of the Geneva, Ithaca, and Sayre Railroad and completed its line of rail through New York. As a result of its leases and acquisitions, the LV gained a monopoly on traffic in the Finger Lakes region. The railroad continued to grow and develop its routes in Pennsylvania.

In Pennsylvania, the LV obtained a charter formerly held by the Schuylkill Haven and Lehigh River Railroad in 1886 which had been held by the Reading Railroad since 1860, when it blocked construction in order to maintain its monopoly in the Southern Coal Field, which held the largest reserves of anthracite in Pennsylvania. Through neglect, the Reading allowed the charter to lapse and it was acquired by the LV, which immediately constructed the Schuylkill and Lehigh Valley Railroad and connected it with the mainline. The line gave the LV a route into Pottsville, Pennsylvania and the Schuylkill Valley coal fields.

The Vosburg Tunnel was completed and opened for service on July 25, 1886. The 16-mile Mountain cut-off, a rail segment of the line, which extended from Fairview, Pennsylvania to the outskirts of Pittston, Pennsylvania, was completed in November 1888. This allowed the line's eastbound grade to be reduced and a shorter route for handling through traffic established.

In New Jersey, the LV had a decade-long legal battle with the CNJ over terminal facilities in Jersey City, New Jersey. In 1887 the two railroads reached a settlement, and construction of the LVs Jersey City freight yard began. The LV obtained a 5-year agreement to use the CNJ line to access the terminal, which opened in 1889. The LV built a separate yard at Oak Island in Newark, New Jersey to sort and prepare trains.

The LV strove throughout the 1880s to acquire its own route to Jersey City and to the Jersey City waterfront. The LV decided to expand the line more to the Northeastern part of New Jersey in order to reach its freight yards without using the CNJ main line.

The LV began construction of a series of railroads to connect the Easton and Amboy Railroad to Jersey City; the new route to Jersey City would connect with the Easton and Amboy line at South Plainfield, New Jersey. The first leg of the construction to Jersey City was the Roselle and South Plainfield Railway. In 1888 it connected with the CNJ at Roselle, New Jersey which provided access over the CNJ to the Hudson River waterfront in Jersey City, New Jersey. The LV, which had built coal docks in Perth Amboy, New Jersey when it built the Easton and Amboy in the 1870s, desired a terminal on the Hudson River closer to New York City. In 1891, the LV consolidated the Roselle and South Plainfield Railway into the Lehigh Valley Terminal Railway, along with the other companies which formed the route from South Plainfield to the Jersey City terminal.

The LV contracted with the CNJ for rights from Roselle to Jersey City, but it eventually finished construction of the line to its terminal in Jersey City over the Newark and Roselle Railway, the Newark and Passaic Railway, the Jersey City, Newark, and Western Railway, and the Jersey City Terminal Railway. The LV's Newark and Roselle Railway brought the line from Roselle into Newark in 1891, where passengers connected to the Pennsylvania Railroad. Bridging Newark Bay proved difficult. The LV first attempted to obtain a right of way at Greenville, but the Pennsylvania Railroad checkmated it by purchasing most of the properties needed. Then the CNJ opposed the LV's attempt to cross its line at Caven Point. Finally, after settling the legal issues, the Newark Bay was bridged in 1892 by the Jersey City, Newark and Western Railway and connected to the National Docks Railway, which was partly owned by the LV and which reached the LV's terminal.

In 1895, the LV constructed the Greenville and Hudson Railway parallel with the National Docks in order to relieve congestion and have a wholly owned route into Jersey City. Finally, in 1900, the LV purchased the National Docks Railway outright.

Following the completion of its terminals at Buffalo and Jersey City, and the establishment of a trunk line across the New York stateline, the LV entered a period of turmoil in the 1890s with the company being entangled in business dealings.

In 1892, the Reading Railroad leased the LV and the CNJ and purchased the railroads' coal companies instead of attempting to maintain agreements among the coal railroads. The Reading than arranged for the Delaware, Lackawanna and Western Railroad to cooperate with the combination, thereby controlling 70% of the trade. Unfortunately, it overreached and in 1893 the Reading was unable to meet its obligations. Its bankruptcy resulted in economic chaos, bringing on the financial panic of 1893 and forcing the LV to break the lease and resume its own operations, leaving it unable to pay dividends on its stock until 1904. The economic depression following 1893 was harsh, though the LV owned or controlled 53,000 acres (210 km^{2}) of coal lands by then.

In 1897, in dire need of support, banking giant J. P. Morgan stepped in to refinance the LV debt, and obtained control of the railroad in the process.

=== 20th century ===
The LV along with other railroads, were nationalized during World War I (1914–1918) in order to prevent strikes and interruptions. The LV built a passenger terminal in Buffalo in 1915. The United States Railroad Administration controlled the LV from 1918 to 1920, at which time control was transferred back to the private companies.

The Great Depression started and the LV began a slow decline even though it had a few periods of prosperity. Passengers preferred the convenience of automobiles to trains, and decades later airlines provided faster long-distance travel than trains. Oil and gas were supplanting coal as the fuel of choice. The Depression had been difficult for all the railroads, and Congress recognized that bankruptcy laws needed revision. By 1931, the PRR controlled 51% of the LV stock.

In 1936, with the LV having developed feeder lines connecting to its main line, the railroad's first line became known as the Lehigh Valley Mainline.

The Chandler Acts of 1938–1939 provided a new form of relief for railroads, allowing them to restructure their debt while continuing to operate. The LV was approved for such a restructuring in 1940 when several large mortgage loans were due. The restructuring allowed the LV to extend the maturity of its mortgages, but needed to repeat the process in 1950. The terms of the restructurings precluded dividend payments until 1953, when LV common stock paid the first dividend since 1931. In 1940, the LV came under the influence of the PRR. In 1941, the Pennsylvania placed its shares in a voting trust after reaching an agreement with the New York Central regarding the PRR's purchase of the Wabash. The LV extended the maturity of its mortgages in 1950, and made dividend payments until 1953.

The LV faced two blows in the 1950s, the Federal-Aid Highway Act in 1956 and the Saint Lawrence Seaway in 1959. The interstate highways helped the trucking industry offer door-to-door service, and the St. Lawrence Seaway allowed grain shipments to bypass the railways and go directly to overseas markets. The LV again stopped dividends in 1957. By the 1960s railroads in the East were struggling to survive.

The Central Railroad of New Jersey, which leased the Lehigh and Susquehanna Railroad. and the Lehigh Valley Railroad began to work together in 1965 to eliminate redundant trackage in the Lehigh Valley area. This ended up being the first step towards the reconfiguration of the Lehigh Valley Mainline with former Lehigh and Susquehanna Railroad main line trackage under Conrail.

The LV declared bankruptcy on July 24, 1970 It remained in operation during the 1970 bankruptcy, as was common practice of the time.

In 1972, the LV assumed the lease of the remaining Central Railroad of New Jersey's Pennsylvania leased trackage from the Lehigh and Susquehanna Railroad, including the main line part of the Central Railroad of New Jersey leased trackage, which was integrated into the Lehigh Valley Mainline years later. The Lehigh and Susquehanna Railroad continued to own the leased trackage until 1976, when it was merged into Conrail along with the LV. Back in 1965, the Central Railroad of New Jersey (which leased the L&S) and the Lehigh Valley Railroad began to work together to eliminate redundant trackage. The Central Railroad of New Jersey was also taken over by Conrail in 1976.

The Central Railroad of New Jersey had meanwhile entered bankruptcy as well. The two railroads had entered a shared trackage agreement in this area in 1965 to reduce costs, as both had parallel routes from Wilkes-Barre virtually all the way to New York, often on adjoining grades through Pennsylvania.

In the years leading up to 1973, the freight railroad system of the U.S. was collapsing. Although government-funded Amtrak took over intercity passenger service on May 1, 1971, railroad companies continued to lose money due to extensive government regulations, expensive and excessive labor cost, competition from other transportation modes, declining industrial business, and other factors; the Lehigh Valley Railroad was one of them.

Hurricane Agnes in 1972 damaged the rundown Northeast railway network which put the solvency of other railroads including the LV in danger; the somewhat more solvent Erie Lackawanna Railway (EL) was also damaged by Hurricane Agnes.

In 1973, the United States Congress acted to create a bill to nationalize all bankrupt railroads which included the LV. The Association of American Railroads, which opposed nationalization, submitted an alternate proposal for a government-funded private company. President Richard Nixon signed the Regional Rail Reorganization Act of 1973 into law. The "3R Act," as it was called, provided interim funding to the bankrupt railroads and defined a new "Consolidated Rail Corporation" under the AAR's plan.

On April 1, 1976, the Lehigh Valley Railroad including the Lehigh Valley Mainline were merged/absorbed into the U.S. government's Consolidated Rail Corporation (Conrail) ending 130 years of existence and 121 years of operation of the LV.

==== Conrail ownership ====
On April 1, 1976, the Consolidated Rail Corporation (reporting mark CR) also known as Conrail acquired the Lehigh Valley Railroad (major portions of its assets) including the Lehigh Valley Mainline and absorbed the Lehigh Valley Railroad into its system. Conrail began operating on the Lehigh Valley Mainline and the remains of the LV immediately. The Central Railroad of New Jersey and the Lehigh and Susquehanna Railroad were also taken over and merged into Conrail, giving the opportunity for Conrail to merge what was left of the Lehigh and Susquehanna Railroad main line into the Lehigh Valley Mainline to replace original Lehigh Valley Mainline trackage in the area.

Other remains of the LV besides the Lehigh Valley Mainline that were merged into Conrail include related branches from Van Etten Junction, northwest of Sayre, Pennsylvania, to Oak Island Yard; the Ithaca branch from Van Etten Junction to Ithaca, New York, connecting to the Cayuga Lake line and on to the Milliken power station in Lake Ridge, New York and the Cargill salt mine just south of Geneva, New York, and small segments in Geneva, New York, from Geneva to the Seneca Army Depot in Kendaia, Batavia, New York, Auburn, New York, and Cortland, New York.

A segment west from Van Etten Junction was included in the Conrail takeover. A segment from Geneva to Victor, New York, later cut back to Shortsville, New York to Victor, remained with the Lehigh Valley Estate under subsidized Conrail operation. The Shortsville to Victor segment became the Ontario Central Railroad in 1979 (the Ontario Central became part of the Finger Lakes Railway in October 2007). Other remaining track left over from the LV was sold to shortline or regional railroads other than Ontario Central Railroad such as the Finger Lakes Railway, the Depew, Lancaster and Western Railroad which is owned by the Genesee Valley Transportation Company, the Livonia, Avon and Lakeville Railroad, the New York, Susquehanna and Western Railway, and finally the Reading Blue Mountain and Northern Railroad.

Conrail was incorporated in Pennsylvania by the U.S. federal government on October 25, 1974, and began operations on April 1, 1976. The U.S. government created Conrail to take over the potentially profitable lines of multiple bankrupt railroads, of which the LV was one. Other bankrupt railroads included the Penn Central Transportation Company and Erie Lackawanna Railway.

Conrail maintained the Lehigh Valley Mainline as a primary main line and the line continued to thrive under its ownership, unlike many lines in the northeast, which were abandoned. The line served as one of Conrail's primary lines headed into the New York City metro area, just like when the line was owned by the Lehigh Valley Railroad. The line was important to Conrail as an alternate route to avoid Amtrak's Northeast Corridor, its main line and main electrified route.

Conrail's other primary line headed into the New York City metro area was the River Subdivision which travels from the North Bergen Yard located in North Bergen, New Jersey to Selkirk Yard located in the Selkirk section of Bethlehem, New York; the River Subdivision is now owned by CSX Transportation, a railroad that is owned by the CSX Corporation. Also during the Conrail ownership, the line met with Conrail's secondary line headed into New York City metro area in Manville, New Jersey, the Trenton Subdivision which travels from Philadelphia, Pennsylvania to Manville; the Trenton Subdivision is now owned by CSX Transportation.

The line was renamed from Lehigh Valley Mainline to Lehigh Line during the Conrail ownership.

With the line now known as the "Lehigh Line", Conrail maintained most of the line's original route ever since the line opened on June 11, 1855. Only a small portion of the line's original right of way was not retained as part of the line's original route, between Bethlehem and Allentown. The line retains the majority of its original right of way, which is between Easton and Bethlehem.

Conrail integrated the Bethlehem and Allentown segment of the main line, part of the former Central Railroad of New Jersey (CNJ) Pennsylvania leased trackage that was formerly owned by the Lehigh and Susquehanna Railroad (LH&S). The LV had acquired the lease from the Lehigh and Susquehanna Railroad in 1972.

The line's original route's new right of way is now former Lehigh and Susquehanna Railroad-owned Central Railroad of New Jersey Pennsylvania leased main line trackage between Allentown and Bethlehem, with a bridge over the Lehigh River to the Bethlehem to Easton part of the original right of way. The Lehigh Line kept the original right of way between Bethlehem and Easton. The original route's new right of way has kept the Lehigh Line in continuous operation since 1855 and kept the line's original route still in operation. The Lehigh Line was allowed to continue as the same rail line that was built and opened on June 11, 1855, by the Lehigh Valley Railroad.

After the reconfiguration of the Lehigh Line's original route by having the Lehigh Valley Railroad- built tracks between Bethlehem to Allentown break away from the line's original route, and replacing them with the Central Railroad of New Jersey-built tracks, the Lehigh Valley Railroad-built tracks from Bethlehem to Allentown that used to be part of the Lehigh Line's original right of way were either transferred to the former Reading Railroad's Reading Line, which was also inherited by Conrail, or were left out of the Reading Line transfer and became their own separate rail lines. The Lehigh Valley Railroad-built tracks from Bethlehem to Allentown that became their own separate rail lines were downgraded to branch lines; these rail lines are now owned by R.J. Corman Railroad/Allentown Lines company which is a subsidiary of R.J. Corman Railroad Group.

With Conrail integrating the Lehigh and Susquehanna Railroad's Bethlehem and Allentown segment of the main line part of the former Central Railroad of New Jersey Pennsylvania leased trackage into the Lehigh Line's original route, while allowing the Lehigh Line to keep the majority of its original right of way between Bethlehem and Allentown and transferring most of the Lehigh Line's original right of way between Allentown and Bethlehem to the Reading Line, Conrail also integrated former Lehigh and Susquehanna Railroad-owned Central Railroad of New Jersey Pennsylvania leased main line trackage between Allentown and Lehighton, Pennsylvania into the Lehigh Line's route from Allentown to Jim Thorpe. This allowed the line to keep its Allentown and Lehighton route and also continue to Jim Thorpe. The line's old right of way between Allentown and Lehighton was then separated from the Lehigh Line.

Conrail was able to integrate the former Lehigh and Susquehanna Railroad-owned Central Railroad of New Jersey Pennsylvania leased main line trackage from Allentown and Bethlehem and from Allentown and Lehighton (which served as most of the Pennsylvania extension of the Central Railroad of New Jersey) into the Lehigh Line because Conrail also acquired and absorbed the Lehigh and Susquehanna Railroad in 1976 along with the Lehigh Valley Railroad. The Lehigh and Susquehanna Railroad was the railroad company for the Lehigh Coal & Navigation Company (LC&N), which founded the Lehigh Canal.

The Lehigh and Susquehanna Railroad opened as the nation's second railroad, with its initial trackage built from near its Delaware Canal connection with the Lehigh Canal at Easton, Pennsylvania alongside the Lehigh to their Mauch Chunk corporate headquarters, the Mauch Chunk & Summit Hill Railway and their Coaling and Canal operations center (now the west bank part of modern Jim Thorpe, Pennsylvania). The Lehigh and Susquehanna Railroad also started slowly building a connecting line southwards from West Pittston, Pennsylvania and the Duryea yard at the confluence of the Lackawanna and Susquehanna in the greater Wilkes-Barre—Scranton area (the Wyoming Valley) over the ridges to White Haven, Pennsylvania at the head of the Lehigh Gorge.

When Lehigh Valley Railroad pushed into the Lehigh Valley through (left bank) East Mauch Chunk and (right bank, shared with the Lehigh and Susquehanna Railroad) Packerton, Pennsylvania, the LC&N management suddenly got motivated to have the Lehigh and Susquehanna Railroad finish the connecting line through the Lehigh River Gorge. The LV completed its parallel stretch in the same period, creating media competition news stories. Despite their experience with the gravity railroad, LC&N management knew they had much to learn about operating the Lehigh and Susquehanna Railroad, so looked for an operating company to partner with to operate the line; subsequently, as was common practice for nearly a century with many of the nation's shortline railroads which were built primarily by local business boosters, it was leased to the Central Railroad of New Jersey in 1871 for 999 years, which operated it as their Lehigh and Susquehanna Division.

In ensuing years, the Central Railroad of New Jersey would run a prestige express passenger service from New York City and Philadelphia, connecting in Easton, to Buffalo, New York and points west in the Great Lakes region, where it competed with the Lehigh Valley Railroad head to head, with parallel tracks sometimes on the same bank or often on the opposite shore of the Susquehanna River.

The Central Railroad of New Jersey leased the Lehigh and Susquehanna Railroad directly from 1871 to 1946; then indirectly using its subsidiaryCentral Railroad of Pennsylvania (CRP) from 1946 to 1952. The Central Railroad of New Jersey tried to operate its lease from the Lehigh and Susquehanna Railroad under their subsidiary Central Railroad of Pennsylvania from 1946 to 1952, which was unrelated to the original Central Railroad of Pennsylvania that ran between Bellefonte and Mill Hall. The Central Railroad of New Jersey used the Central Railroad of Pennsylvania to avoid certain New Jersey taxes on its Pennsylvania lines. The Easton and Western Railroad, a short branch west of Easton, Pennsylvania, was renamed to the Central Railroad of Pennsylvania in 1944 and all Pennsylvania leases, primarily the lease to operate on the Lehigh and Susquehanna Railroad, were transferred to it in 1946.

The Central Railroad of Pennsylvania began operations on August 5, 1946. Around the same time, the CNJ logo was changed from "Central Railroad Company of New Jersey" to "Jersey Central Lines". The attempt by the Central Railroad of New Jersey to reduce New Jersey corporate taxes failed; the arrangement was struck down by the courts, so the Central Railroad of Pennsylvania operations were merged back into the Central Railroad of New Jersey six years later, in 1952. In 1972, the Central Railroad of New Jersey ended its leases on the Pennsylvania lines and abandoned its Pennsylvania operations. The leases to the Pennsylvania lines were then operated by the Lehigh Valley Railroad.

With Conrail integrating former Lehigh and Susquehanna Railroad-owned Central Railroad of New Jersey Pennsylvania leased main line trackage into both the Lehigh Line's original route and into the Lehigh Line's route between Allentown and Lehighton, Conrail also integrated other Central Railroad of New Jersey trackage (this time officially owned by the Central Railroad of New Jersey itself) around Phillipsburg into the line while keeping the LV trackage in Phillipsburg with the line as well, thus keeping both the line's LV trackage in Phillipsburg and the line's new CNJ trackage in Phillipsburg in service at the same time. This lasted until the mid to late 1980s, when Conrail decided to abandon the line's LV trackage in Phillipsburg.

Conrail added a switch track on the Lehigh Line in Phillipsburg that connected the line's LV Phillipsburg trackage with the line's new ex-CNJ Phillipsburg trackage. Conrail abandoned the leftover ex-CNJ Phillipsburg trackage that was not integrated into the Lehigh Line, which included abandoning other ex-CNJ trackage toward Bloomsbury, New Jersey.

Later on, Conrail closed and abandoned the Lehigh Line's LV Phillipsburg trackage and decided to only use CNJ Phillipsburg trackage. Conrail noticed that the LV Phillipsburg bridge needed major repairs but, as an alternative to save money, Conrail decided to close the LV Phillipsburg bridge and only use the CNJ Phillipsburg bridge full-time. This resulted in abandoning the line's LV Phillipsburg trackage and only using the CNJ Phillipsburg trackage. The CNJ Phillipsburg bridge was more stable than the LV Phillipsburg bridge.

A logo later adopted by Conrail

The Lehigh Line was abandoned by Conrail in New York state relatively soon after its 1976 acquisition, initially all the way East and south from Buffalo to Sayre Yard in Sayre, Pennsylvania, with a few miles of former trackage sold to regional and shortline railroads in New York State. The Lehigh Line ran from Sayre to Newark, New Jersey for the majority of its time under Conrail. Conrail later cut back the Lehigh Line to Mehoopany, Pennsylvania and ceased operations from Sayre to Mehoopany, which tracks became a new rail line called the Lehigh Secondary that was later leased to a short line operator.

The Lehigh Line was reduced for one last time under Conrail in 1993 to its current west end point at Penn Haven Junction (also known as Old Penn Haven or M&H Junction) in Lehigh Township, Carbon County, Pennsylvania. The tracks past Penn Haven Junction became a new rail line called the Lehigh Division. The Lehigh Division inherited the following Lehigh Line trackage:

- Lehigh Line original trackage between Penn Haven Junction and White Haven, Pennsylvania
- Lehigh Line Mountain Cutoff trackage between Laurel Run, Pennsylvania to Duryea, Pennsylvania
- Lehigh Line original trackage between Duryea and Mehoopany, Pennsylvania
- Lehigh Line Lehigh and Susquehanna Railroad main line trackage between White Haven to Laurel Run
- Lehigh Line right track from Penn Haven Junction to Lehighton to Lehighton, Pennsylvania

Despite the Lehigh Line's end point at Penn Haven Junction, the Lehigh Line's right track from Penn Haven Junction to Lehighton became part of the Lehigh Division; the Lehigh Division's starting point is Lehighton and not Penn Haven Junction and both the Lehigh Line and the Lehigh Division now share the same right of way from Penn Haven Junction to Lehighton. The Lehigh Division was operated as a major freight low grade rail line and continued as part of Conrail until 1996. The Lehigh Line's route is now from Penn Haven Junction in Lehigh Township to Oak Island Yard in Newark, New Jersey. The Lehigh Line kept its original route from Easton, Pennsylvania to Allentown, Pennsylvania.

Conrail sold the three-year-old Lehigh Division to the Reading Blue Mountain and Northern Railroad (RBMN) in 1996. During the 2000s, the Reading Blue Mountain and Northern would later decrease the Lehigh Division from Mehoopany to Dupont, Pennsylvania and the tracks from Dupont to Mehoopany were separated from the Lehigh Division and became a new rail line called the Susquehanna Branch; the Susquehanna Branch inherited original Lehigh Division trackage from Dupont to Mehoopany which is also Lehigh Line original trackage and Lehigh Line Mountain Cutoff trackage.

Both the Lehigh Division and the Susquehanna Branch are still in operation and are still owned by Reading Blue Mountain and Northern Railroad; the Lehigh Division is today one of the two primary main branch lines of the Reading Blue Mountain and Northern Railroad; the other is the Reading Division. The Lehigh Division doesn't connect with the Reading Division, but Reading Blue Mountain and Northern combined operations for both the Lehigh Division and the Reading Division, including a Jim Thorpe, Pennsylvania Nesquehoning Junction connector track and the Susquehanna Branch's Dupont to Duryea Yard (near Pittston, Pennsylvania) trackage (once part of the Lehigh Division) is labeled "Reading Blue Mountain and Northern main line". Today the Norfolk Southern Railway (the current owner of the Lehigh Line) still has trackage rights south of Dupont, Pennsylvania on the Lehigh Division.

Conrail's success was increasing but, in 1997, Conrail was approached by CSX Transportation as a merger partner. However, the Norfolk Southern Railway and its parent the Norfolk Southern Corporation disagreed with such a merger and began an epic takeover battle with CSX to purchase Conrail. During the Conrail takeover battle, the Norfolk Southern Railway completed the absorption of the Norfolk and Western Railway which was also owned by the Norfolk Southern Corporation.

Norfolk Southern and CSX finally struck a compromise and agreed to jointly acquire Conrail and split most of its system and assets between them, with Norfolk Southern acquiring a larger portion of the Conrail network via a larger stock buyout; this returned rail freight competition to the Northeast, and was essentially mandated by the Federal STB. Under the final agreement approved by the Surface Transportation Board, Norfolk Southern acquired 58 percent of Conrail's assets, including roughly 6,000 Conrail route miles which included the Lehigh Line, and CSX received 42 percent of Conrail's assets, including about 3,600 route miles.

The buyout was approved by the Surface Transportation Board and both sides took control of Conrail on August 22, 1998; it was finalized a year later, so both sides could operate their portions that formerly belonged to Conrail after that. The lines were transferred to two newly formed limited liability companies, to be subsidiaries of Conrail but leased to CSX and Norfolk Southern, respectively New York Central Lines (NYC) and Pennsylvania Lines (PRR). The NYC and PRR reporting marks, which had passed to Conrail, were also transferred to the new companies, and NS also acquired the CR reporting mark. Conrail ended operations on May 31, 1999, and its lines were finally split between the two remaining Class I railroads in the East, Norfolk Southern Railway and CSX Transportation. Both railroads under Norfolk Southern and CSX began operations on the former lines of Conrail on June 1, 1999; the Lehigh Line went to Norfolk Southern Railway. The Norfolk Southern Railway also acquired the Lehigh Secondary which was once part of the Lehigh Line.

==== Norfolk Southern Railway ownership ====
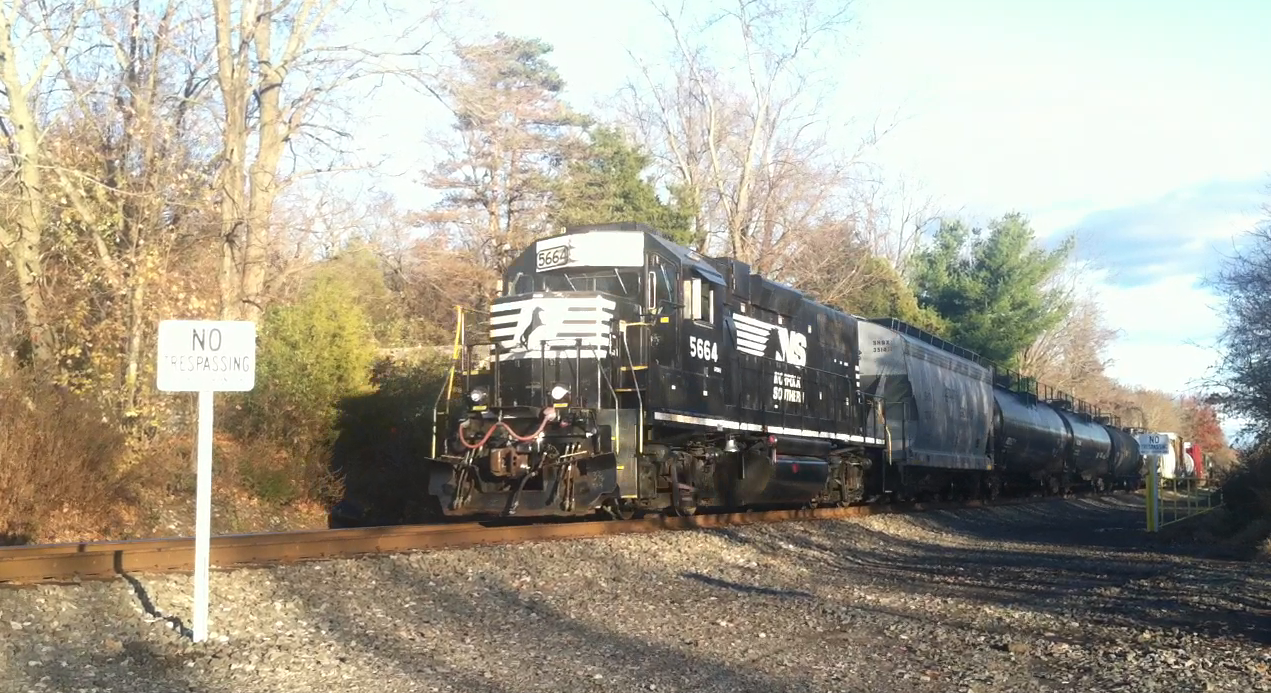
A Norfolk Southern Railway westbound delivery train passing through Three Bridges in Readington Township, New Jersey on the Lehigh Line

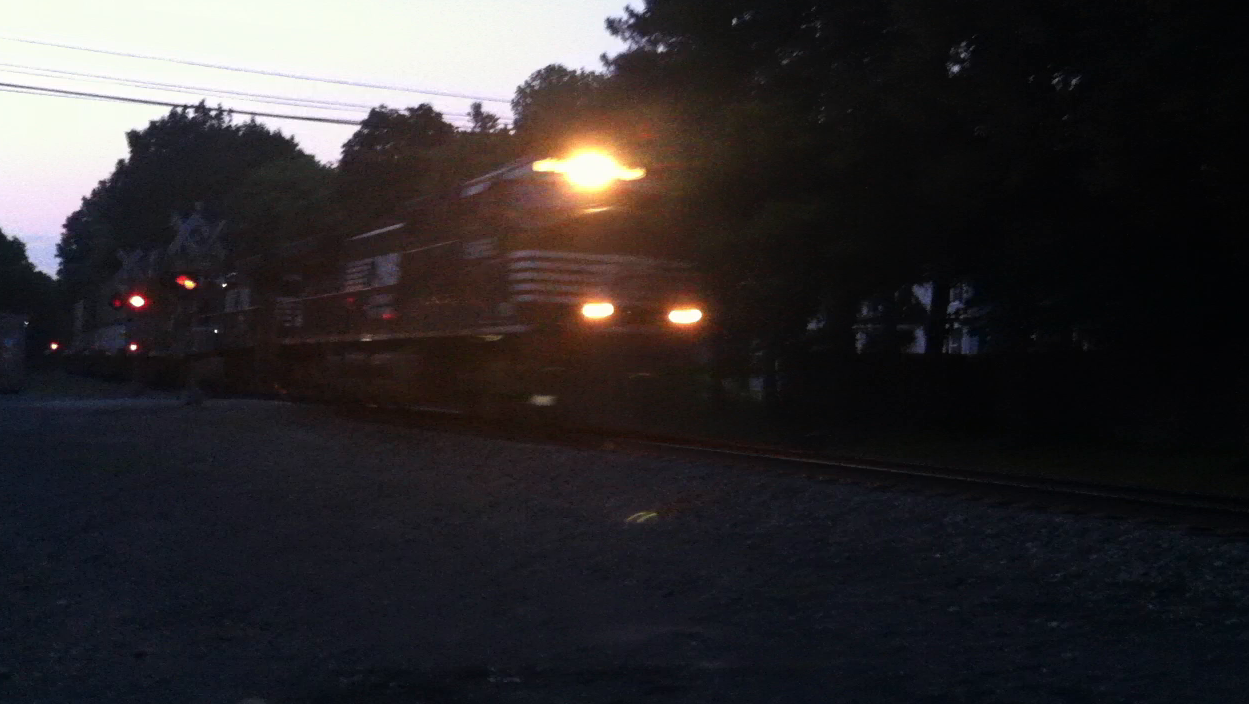
Norfolk Southern eastbound train on the Lehigh Line passing through a crossing near Flemington, New Jersey

On June 1, 1999, Conrail ended operations and its lines were split between Norfolk Southern Railway (which is owned and operated by the Norfolk Southern Corporation) and CSX Transportation (which is owned and operated by the CSX Corporation). The Norfolk Southern Railway, which was chartered in 1894 as the Southern Railway in the Southern United States, acquired the Lehigh Line in the Conrail split.

With Norfolk Southern acquiring the line, the Lehigh Line wasn't eligible to keep all of its current route and lost its route from CP Port Reading in Manville, New Jersey to the Oak Island Yard in Newark, New Jersey in order for both Norfolk Southern and CSX to have equal competition in the Northeast. The line's former existing tracks from Manville to Oak Island Yard still exist and are still in operation, but are now operating as a new rail line that serves as an extension of the Lehigh Line, while not being a continuation of the Lehigh Line into Oak Island Yar. that is owned and operated by both Norfolk Southern and CSX under a joint venture called Conrail Shared Assets Operations; the joint venture serves as a switching and terminal railroad for Norfolk Southern and CSX in New Jersey, Philadelphia, and Detroit. Norfolk Southern owns 58 percent of the joint venture and CSX owns 42 percent of the joint venture, but both Norfolk Southern and CSX has equal voting interest in the joint venture. Conrail Shared Assets Operations was a concession made to federal regulators who were concerned about the lack of competition in certain rail markets and logistical problems associated with the breaking-up of the Conrail operations as they existed in densely populated areas with many local customers.

The new rail line that is placed under the joint venture shares the "Lehigh Line" name. The new rail line that was once part of the Lehigh Line which handles Norfolk Southern freights off the Lehigh Line also handles traffic off the Trenton Subdivision, CSX's secondary line into the New York metropolitan area. The River Subdivision is CSX's primary line into the New York City metro area.

With the line losing its route from Manville to Oak Island, the line's new route is now from Penn Haven Junction in Lehigh Township, Carbon County, Pennsylvania to Port Reading Junction in Manville, New Jersey. The line was able to continue as the original line and not as a new rail line despite losing its tracks from Manville to Oak Island Yard, with those existing tracks becoming a new rail line sharing the "Lehigh Line" name because the line kept its original route between Easton and Allentown.

=== 21st century ===
The Norfolk Southern Railway continued to improve the Lehigh Line into the 21st century. In 2014, Norfolk Southern purchased the former Delaware and Hudson line from Schenectady, New York, to Sunbury, Pennsylvania from Canadian Pacific. Prior to the acquisition, it had acquired trackage rights over the D&H in New York and Pennsylvania from CP to access its own Lehigh Line. The Lehigh Line was double tracked near Flemington, New Jersey in Hunterdon County.

Amtrak has expressed interest on bringing passenger service back to the Lehigh Valley with service extending to all three cities - Easton, Bethlehem and Allentown. If approved by Norfolk Southern Railway, the Lehigh Line would once again host passenger rail service for the first time since 1961. However, NJ Transit's Raritan Valley Line is the suspected passenger train service to run its trains on the Lehigh Line.

== Operations ==
=== Background ===
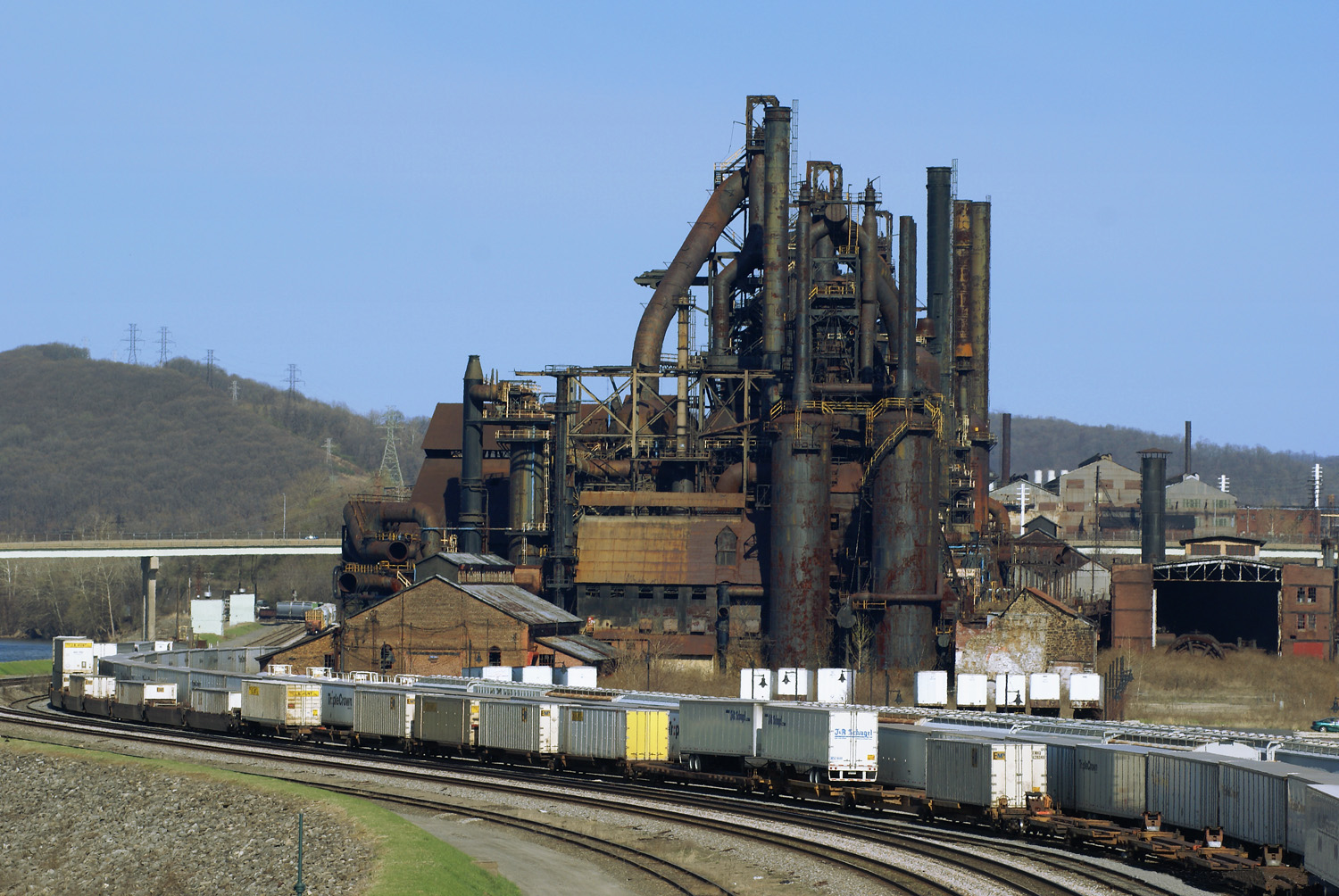
The Lehigh Line passing by the site of the former Bethlehem Steel plant, now the Wind Creek Bethlehem casino, in Bethlehem, Pennsylvania

The Lehigh Line is a major freight railroad line that operates in New Jersey and Pennsylvania that is owned and operated by the Norfolk Southern Railway Company, an Eastern United States Class 1 railroad and primary subsidiary to the Norfolk Southern Corporation. The line runs from Port Reading Junction in Manville, New Jersey to Penn Haven Junction in Lehigh Township, Carbon County, Pennsylvania.

On June 11, 1855, the line began operations at Easton, Pennsylvania to Allentown, Pennsylvania on June 11, 1855. The line then branched out past Allentown to the Northwest and past Easton to the East reaching towns and cities such as Jim Thorpe, Pennsylvania, the Wilkes-Barre, Pennsylvania area, Buffalo, New York, Perth Amboy, New Jersey, Newark, New Jersey and Jersey City, New Jersey.

The line hosts approximately twenty-five trains per day, with traffic peaking at the end of the week. East of the junction with the Reading Line in Allentown, Pennsylvania and in Bethlehem, Pennsylvania, the line serves as Norfolk Southern's main corridor in and out of the Port of New York and New Jersey, and the New York City Metro Area at large, as Norfolk Southern doesn't currently use the eastern half of their Southern Tier Line, which follows the Delaware River north to Binghamton, New York. The line is part of Norfolk Southern's Harrisburg Division and it is part Norfolk Southern's Crescent Corridor, a railroad corridor.

The line passes through the approximately 5,000 foot Pattenburg Tunnel in West Portal, New Jersey along its route. Most of the traffic along the line consists of intermodal and general merchandise trains going to yards such as Oak Island Yard in Newark, New Jersey and Croxton Yard in Jersey City, New Jersey. The Lehigh Line passes through the former Bethlehem, Pennsylvania location of the Bethlehem Steel corporation which is now Wind Creek Bethlehem casino.

=== Connections ===
The line connects with Conrail Shared Assets Operations's Lehigh Line and CSX Transportation's Trenton Subdivision at its east end point at Port Reading Junction in Manville, New Jersey and connects with the Reading Blue Mountain and Northern Railroad's Reading Division at Packerton, Pennsylvania and Reading Blue Mountain and Northern Railroad's Lehigh Division at Lehighton, Pennsylvania and Penn Haven Junction in Lehigh Township, Carbon County, Pennsylvania (originally it was only Penn Haven Junction in Lehigh Township).

The Lehigh Line makes notable connections with other Norfolk Southern lines such as the Reading Line and independent shortline railroads.

At Three Bridges, New Jersey in Readington Township, the line interchanges with Black River and Western Railroad. At Phillipsburg, New Jersey, near the former Phillipsburg Union Station, the line interchanges with the Dover and Delaware River Railroad, which operates along the Washington Secondary line, and the Belvidere and Delaware River Railway which also passes over the Belvidere and Delaware River after that. Across the river in Easton, Pennsylvania, the line interchanges with its Pennsylvania side branch line, the Portland Secondary which extends from Easton to Portland, Pennsylvania connecting to the Stroudsburg Secondary which was originally part of the Lackawanna Old Road (or simply Old Road); the Stroudsburg Secondary goes under the Lackawanna Cut-Off and Norfolk Southern uses the Stroudsburg Secondary to interchange with the Delaware-Lackawanna Railroad.

=== Passenger services ===
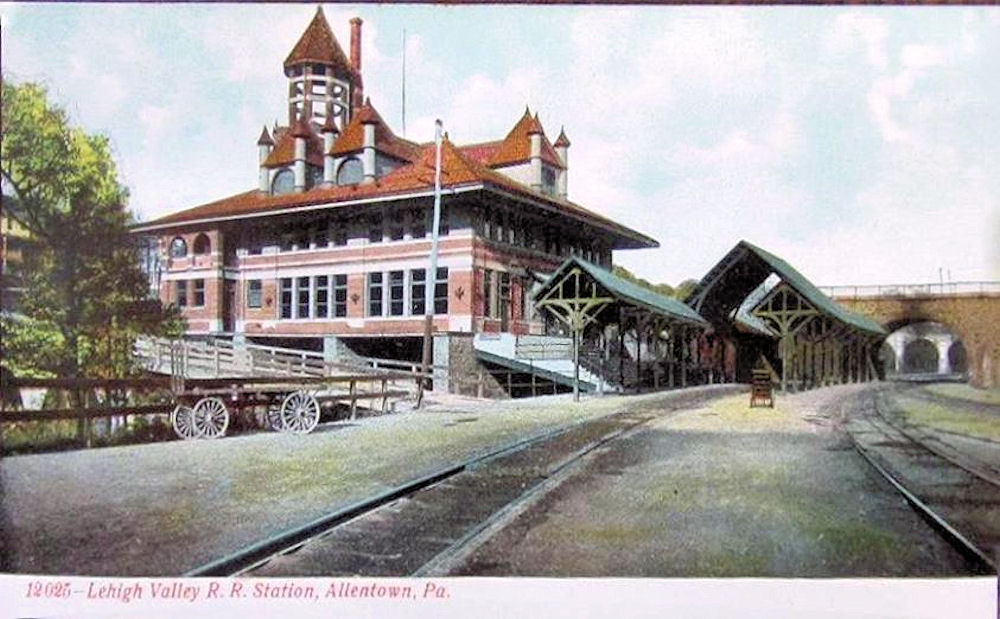
The Lehigh Valley Railroad station. Until the 1950s, the Lehigh Valley Railroad offered 2 hour and 15 minute direct train service to Penn Station New York in New York City

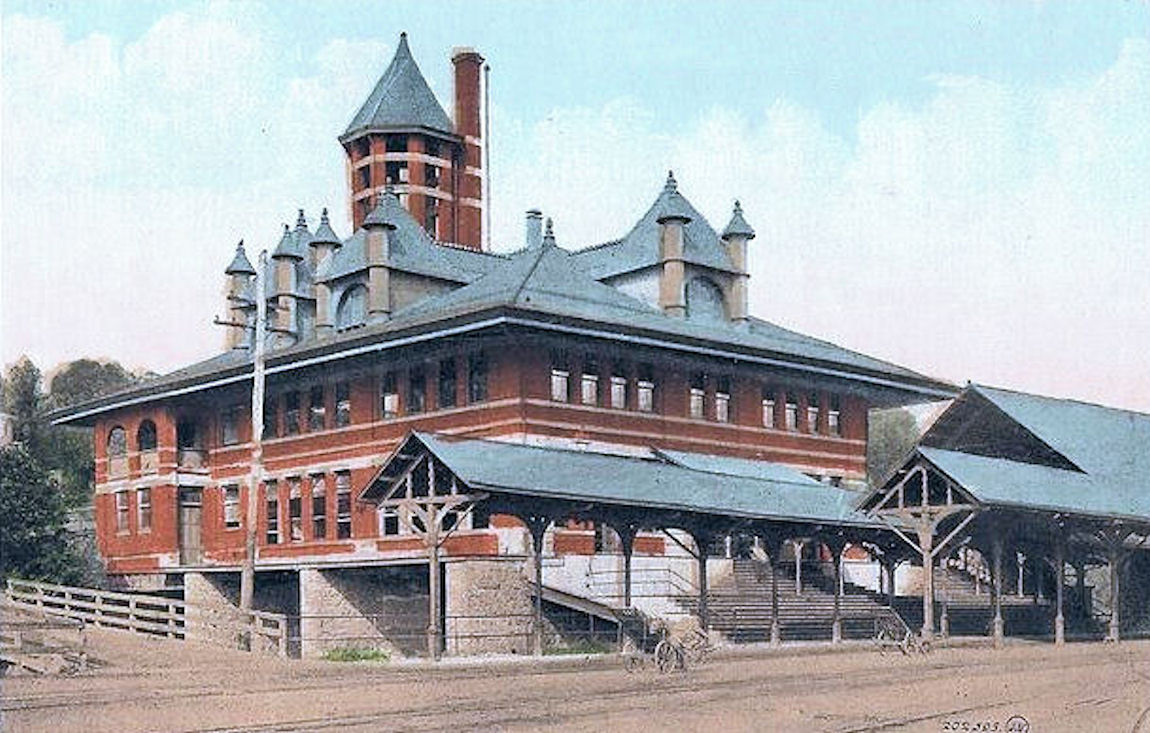
Lehigh Valley Railroad Station from the southeast on Hamilton Street in Allentown, Pennsylvania

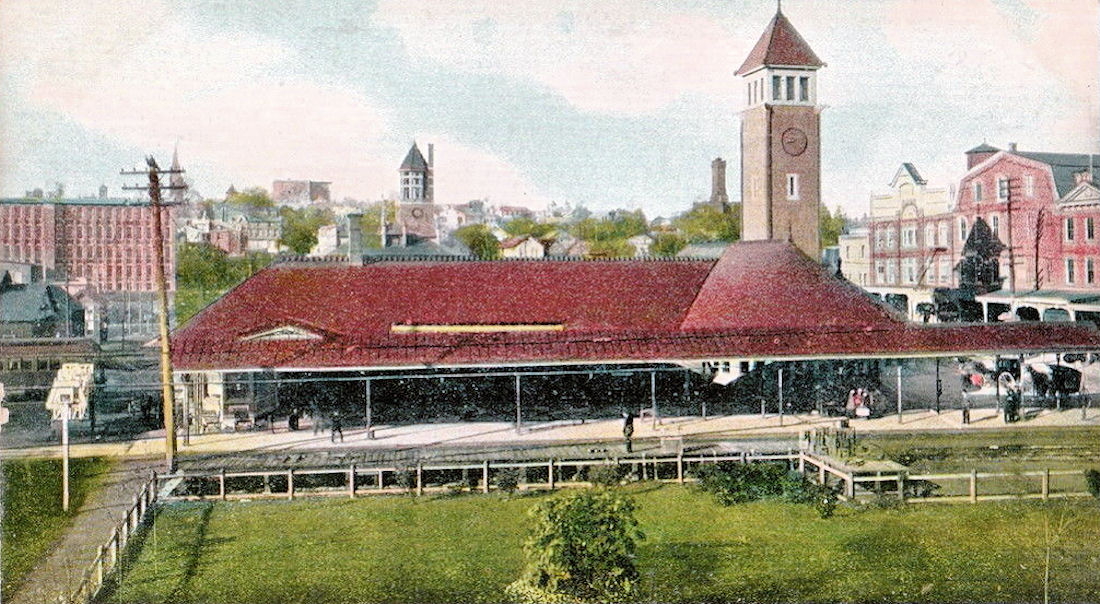
The Central Railroad of New Jersey's Allentown Terminal Railroad Station from the west on Hamilton Street in Allentown, Pennsylvania with Lehigh Valley Railroad station in background

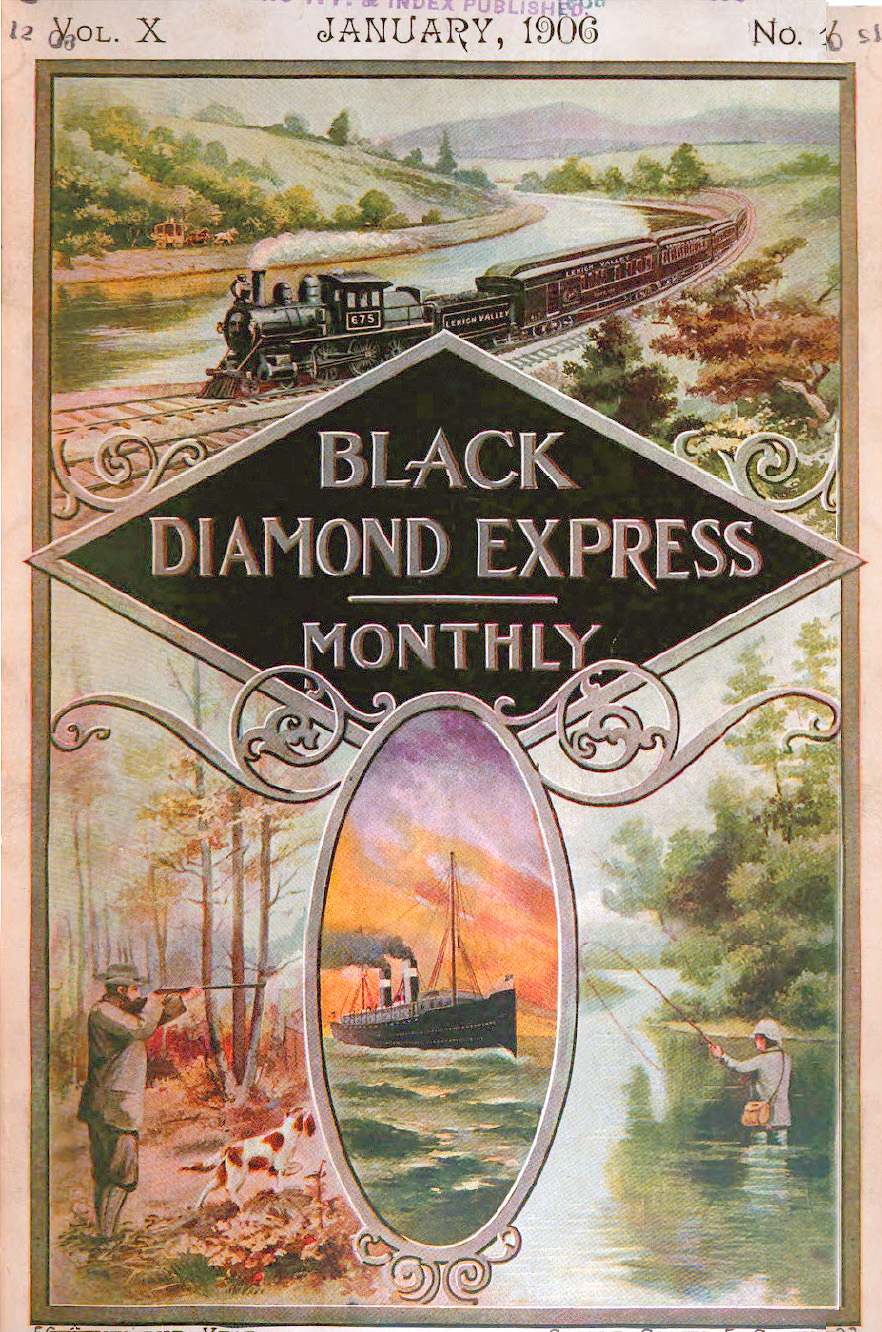
The January 1906 cover of Black Diamond Express Monthly

The Lehigh Line hosted several named passenger trains that was operated by its parent the Lehigh Valley Railroad (LV) mostly in the post-World War II era when the line was known as the Lehigh Valley Mainline, most notably the Black Diamond. Central Railroad of New Jersey (CNJ) passenger trains did travel on the former Lehigh and Susquehanna Railroad owned trackage segments that were integrated into the Lehigh Line during the Conrail ownership.

Allentown was once a passenger rail hub from 1890 to 1967 and again in 1978 and 1979 for the Lehigh Valley Railroad and the Central Railroad of New Jersey but also for the Lehigh and New England Railroad, the Reading Railroad, the Lehigh Valley Transit Company, and then Conrail and SEPTA for its Bethlehem Line service, which did not involve the Lehigh Line. Allentown's passenger railroad stations provided inter-city rail service to Allentown. Allentown's

Allentown was served by two passenger train stations, the Central Railroad of New Jersey and the Reading Company Allentown Terminal Railroad Station, which was constructed in 1888 and 1889, and the Lehigh Valley Railroad Station (built in 1889 directly west of the CNJ station). Both stations were located on the south side of the 300 block of Hamilton Street, the LV station extending over the Jordan Creek. The Allentown Terminal Station was operated jointly by the Central Railroad of New Jersey and Philadelphia and Reading (Reading) Railroad. The Central Railroad of New Jersey and the Reading Railroad leased each other's lines in Pennsylvania.

Routes from Allentown served Wilkes-Barre, Pennsylvania and Scranton, Pennsylvania to the north, Buffalo, New York and Williamsport, Pennsylvania to the northwest, Reading, Pennsylvania and Harrisburg, Pennsylvania to the west, Jersey City, New Jersey and New York City to the east, and Philadelphia to the south.

Allentown currently has no passenger rail service (the last service by SEPTA ceased operating in 1979) but one of its two main train stations remains standing. There is a possibility for passenger rail service to connect the Lehigh Valley area with New York City to eliminate some of the bus traffic. This is being investigated because rail lines already are in place in Phillipsburg, New Jersey, when the town once had rail service. The cost to run new tracks to Allentown is being evaluated to find if train service is worth the money.

Allentown is a regional center for commercial freight rail traffic. Norfolk Southern Railway's primary hump classification yards are located in Allentown, and the city is also served by the R.J. Corman Railroad Group.

==== Lehigh Valley Railroad passenger service ====
The Lehigh Valley Railroad was the primary railroad that operated passenger services on the Lehigh Line.

During the first half of the 19th century, Allentown was primarily a small market town for farmers. In 1851, however, the first railroad reached Allentown with the chartering of the Delaware, Lehigh, Schuylkill and Susquehanna Railroad, which later became the Lehigh Valley Railroad. A small station was built in 1855, the year the LV began operations, which linked Allentown with Easton and later with Mauch Chunk. However, the railroad was not a major factor in local transportation at this time.

The primary passenger motive power for the LV in the diesel era was the ALCO PA-1 car body diesel-electric locomotive, of which the LV had fourteen. These locomotives were also used in freight service during and after the era of LV passenger service. A pair of ALCO FA-2 FB-2 car body diesel-electric locomotives were also purchased to augment the PAs when necessary. These were FAs with steam generators, but they were not designated as FPA-2 units.

The Lehigh Valley Railroad had its peak of passengers during the 1940s, however during the 1950s, the number of railroad passengers declined drastically which caused the Lehigh Valley Railroad to terminate all of its passenger service which happened on February 4, 1961. Budd Rail Diesel Car service would continue on a branch line (Lehighton-Hazleton) for an additional four days. The majority of passenger equipment is believed to have been scrapped some time after February 1961. Most serviceable equipment not retained for company service was sold to other roads.

==== Industrial era passenger services ====
In the late 1880s, both railroads built elaborate stations in Allentown, and all the rail lines serving Allentown converged at the two stations. The LV rail lines ran from Allentown to Mauch Chunk, primarily along the west side of the Lehigh River. The lines crossed under the Tilghman Street Bridge past the LV Freight yard north of Walnut Street, then under Linden Street to the passenger station. The lines continued south out of Allentown, then turned east, following the west side of the river through Rittersville, Fountain Hill and South Bethlehem under the Hill to Hill Bridge, past Bethlehem Steel to Easton, Pennsylvania.

The CNJ tracks ran along the east side of the Lehigh from Mauch Chunk, then crossed the river where American Parkway now ends and turns onto North Dauphin Street. The old CNJ crossover bridge remains standing derelict crossing the river. South of Allentown, the CNJ line turned east and again crossed the Lehigh River, following the west side through the CNJ's Allentown yard, which is still operated by Norfolk Southern Railway.

Both railroads' lines into Allentown were double-tracked, paralleling each other into their respective stations following American Parkway, which was later built on the abandoned railbed. A shared, separate double-tracked freight line ran to the east of the passenger stations.

During World War I, both stations were used by the United States Army Ambulance Service (USAAS) that operated Camp Crane, a training camp for Army Ambulance drivers and support personnel. Thousands of soldiers arrived in Allentown at the stations, then were transported to the training camp. After graduating from training, the stations became pre-embarkation point, with thousands of men moving in and out rapidly, usually arriving and leaving on trains in the middle of the night.

The Allentown stations provided passenger rail service for decades to Scranton, Reading, Harrisburg, New York City, Philadelphia and other points along the nation's inter-city rail network.

==== End of service ====
The Lehigh Valley Railroad's passenger service in the 1950s declined drastically due to the number of declining patronage as the Interstate Highway network grew and long-distance bus and airline service expanded. Due to declining passenger patronage which caused the LV's passenger service to become unprofitable, the Lehigh Valley Railroad successfully petitioned the Interstate Commerce Commission to terminate all of its passenger service in early 1961. This took effect on February 4, 1961, as the LV ended service to Allentown, Pennsylvania on this date. Budd Rail Diesel Car service would continue on a branch line (Lehighton-Hazleton) for an additional four days.

Central Railroad of New Jersey and the Reading Railroad suffered the same fate in terms of reduced passenger ridership. Reading Railroad Allentown-Harrisburg passenger service was ended in June 1963, and it combined its Allentown service to Reading Terminal in Philadelphia with the Central Railroad of New Jersey in 1965. It continued operations to Jersey City, New Jersey for two more years before ending all passenger service from Allentown in 1967.

After the end of passenger rail service to Allentown, both the Lehigh Valley and Jersey Central stations were closed and abandoned. Both stations became derelict and the Lehigh Valley station was demolished in 1972 with the widening of the Hamilton Street Bridge over Jordan Creek. Today only some rusting steel beams extending over the Creek remain.

The CNJ rail lines were torn up and Hamilton Street was resurfaced over where the lines had run. The CNJ station remained derelict until 1980 when the property was purchased and the building was restored into a restaurant. The renovated property went through several owners (Depot Restaurant, Gingerbread Man, B&G Station, Jillian's Billiard Cafe) over the next two decades, lastly being called Banana Joe's which opened on Labor Day, 2001. The property abruptly closed in September 2007 after a shooting which caused a dramatic drop-off in patrons. It has remained closed and vacant since then (February 2016); the building slowly deteriorating.

==== SEPTA ====
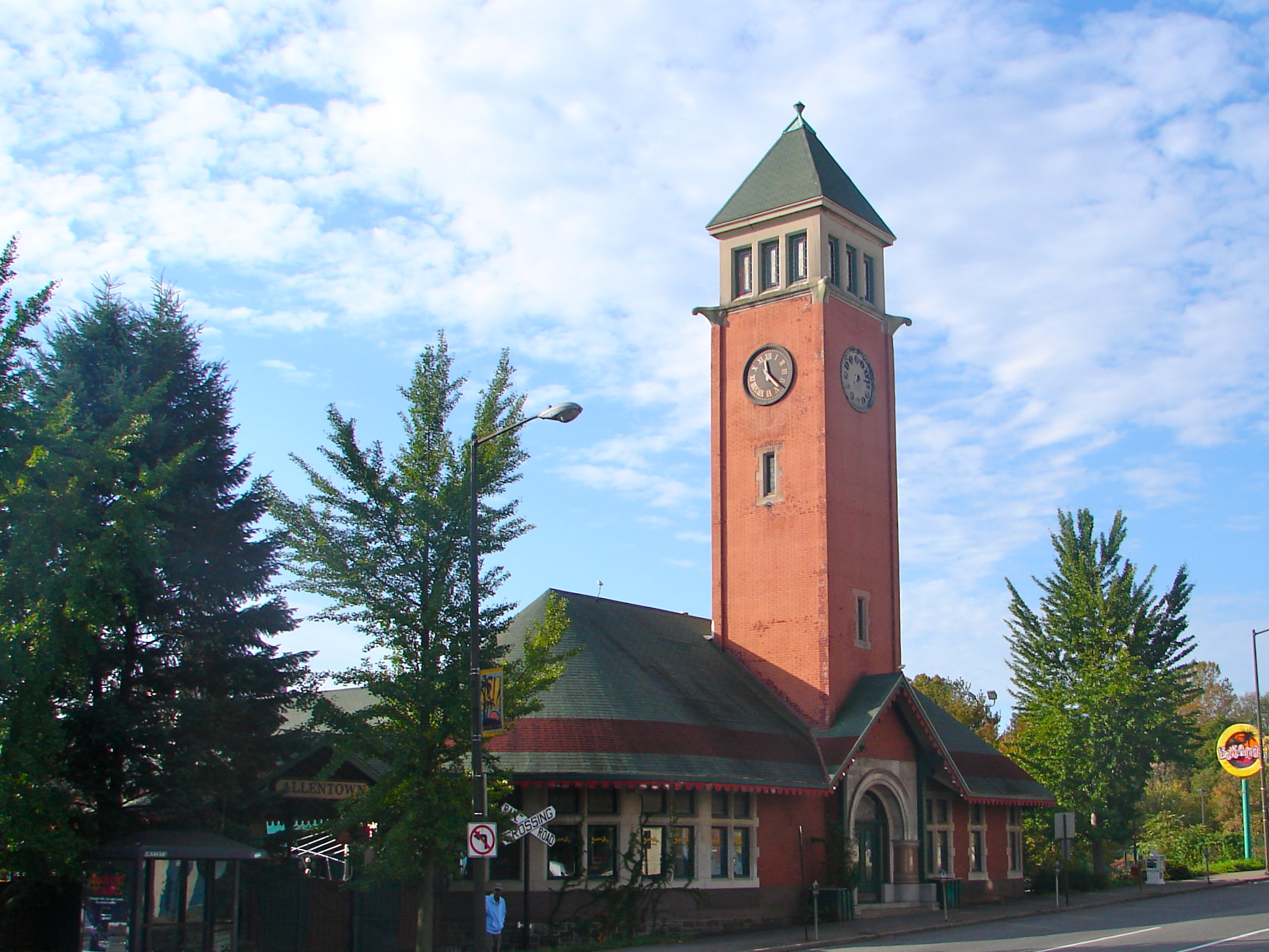
CNJ Allentown station in October 2011

CNJ, LV, and the RDG were merged into Conrail in April 1976. In 1978, SEPTA reestablished passenger service between Allentown and Philadelphia under Conrail using former LV rails. Because there was no longer a station, SEPTA riders had to utilize a makeshift platform located one block south of the former train station at a gravel lot at Third and Union Streets.

The service was popular with riders, However, it ended as rapidly as it began in 1979 due to poor trackage and loss of the operating subsidy from PennDOT. For commuters traveling from Allentown/Bethlehem and Philadelphia, it had proved faster to drive to the village of Center Valley instead and board trains there.

==== Possible return of passenger service ====
In November 2008, the Lehigh Valley Economic Development Corporation (LVEDC), along with both Lehigh County and Northampton County, Pennsylvania commissioned a study to explore restoring part of the Black Diamond service, which ran until 1961 by extending the New Jersey Transit's Raritan Valley Line to Allentown.

In 2010, a commissioned report studied the extension of passenger train service from Phillipsburg, New Jersey into Pennsylvania with stations in Easton, Bethlehem, and Allentown. The Lehigh Valley area has experienced considerable growth over the past several decades, and a large number of commuters use intercity bus service to commute to New York City daily. The proposed rail route would use the Lehigh Line in Easton and Bethlehem and the RJ Corman right-of-way (Lehighton Industrial Track) in Allentown.

The proposed Allentown Station would be located between Hamilton Street and Union Street with access from Third Street. Parking would be available at the Allentown Bus Terminal or a new parking facility at the station site. LANta's A and E bus lines would serve the station.

Today the only rail service now operating into downtown Allentown is a single-track short haul line that runs on the old LV tracks, terminating at American Parkway and Gordon Streets. A heavily used Norfolk Southern Reading Line line remains, running through south Allentown and including a major freight yard.

==== Lehigh Valley Railroad passenger trains ====
The completed list of Lehigh Valley Railroad Central Railroad of New Jersey named passenger trains that operated on the Lehigh Line:

- LV- No. 11 The Star
- LV- No. 4 The Major
- LV- No. 7/8 The Maple Leaf
- LV- No. 9/10 The Black Diamond
- LV- No. 23/24 The Lehighton Express
- LV- No. 25/26 The Asa Packer, named for the LVRR's best-known president
- LV- No. 28/29 The John Wilkes

==== Central Railroad of New Jersey passenger trains ====
The completed list of Central Railroad of New Jersey named passenger trains that operated on the Lehigh Line:

- CNJ- Bullet: Jersey City-Wilkes-Barre, Pennsylvania via Allentown, Pennsylvania
- CNJ- Mermaid: Sandy Hook, New Jersey-Scranton, Pennsylvania

==== Lehigh Line passenger and freight stations in Allentown ====
Lehigh Valley Railroad stations (former right of way in Allentown)

- 40°36′14″N 075°27′29″W

Original LVRR passenger station
40°36′16″N 075°27′24″W
Original LVRR freight station
The LVRR initially located its facilities on the south side of Union Street in 1855. After the large 1890 station opened, the old Union Street station was used as a freight station for several years. It was closed by the end of World War I.

- 40°36′23″N 075°27′47″W

LVRR freight Station

- 40°36′35″N 075°27′57″W

There was a small LVRR passenger station on the south side of West Gordon Street between North Jordan Street and the bridge over Jordan Creek. It was closed by the end of World War I.

Central Railroad of New Jersey stations (current right of way in Allentown)

- 40°36′23″N 075°27′11″W

Original CRRNJ passenger station in East Allentown.
40°36′23″N 075°27′10″W
Original CRRNJ freight station in East Allentown.
The CRRNJ initially located its facilities at the corner of Lehigh (now East Hamilton) and Front Street (now Albert Street) in East Allentown about 1880. The freight station was still in operation as of 1911, but were closed before World War I.

- 40°36′22″N 075°27′45″W

The CRRNJ and Reading Railroads operated a freight station on the SE corner of Race and Linden Streets.

- 40°36′37″N 075°27′51″W

The CRRNJ operated a small passenger station on the south side of West Gordon Street on the east side of the tracks (what is now American Parkway). It was closed before World War I.

== Name ==
The Lehigh Line is the official name of the Norfolk Southern Railway rail line that runs from Manville, New Jersey to Lehigh Township, Carbon County, Pennsylvania.

The Lehigh Line was once known as Lehigh Valley Mainline and it was sometimes pronounced as either Lehigh Valley Main Line, Lehigh Valley mainline or Lehigh Valley main line.

The Lehigh Line shares the name with the Conrail Shared Assets Operations's Lehigh Line, which was originally part of the Lehigh Line. The Lehigh Line is also known as NS Lehigh Line or Norfolk Southern Lehigh Line to distinguish itself from the Conrail Shared Assets Operations's Lehigh Line. In turn, the Conrail Shared Assets Operations's Lehigh Line is referred to as Conrail Lehigh Line or CSAO Lehigh Line to distinguish itself from the Lehigh Line.

The Lehigh Line is referred to as the original line and the Conrail Shared Assets Operations's Lehigh Line is referred to as a new rail line.

The Lehigh Line has been mistakenly referred to as Lehigh Valley Line in press releases.

== Gallery ==
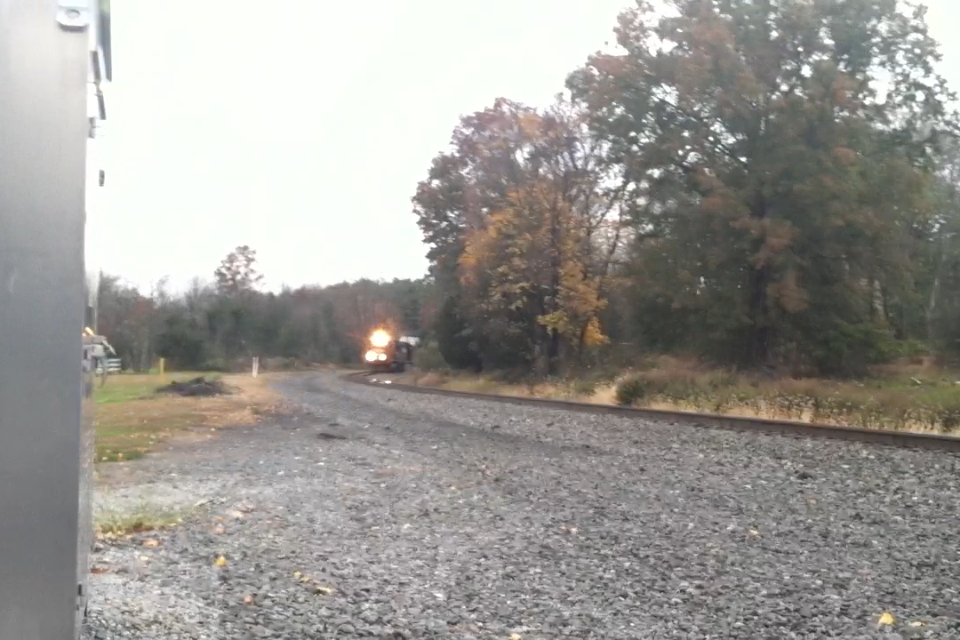
Norfolk Southern eastbound train passing through Clinton Township, New Jersey on the Lehigh Line, Picture 1

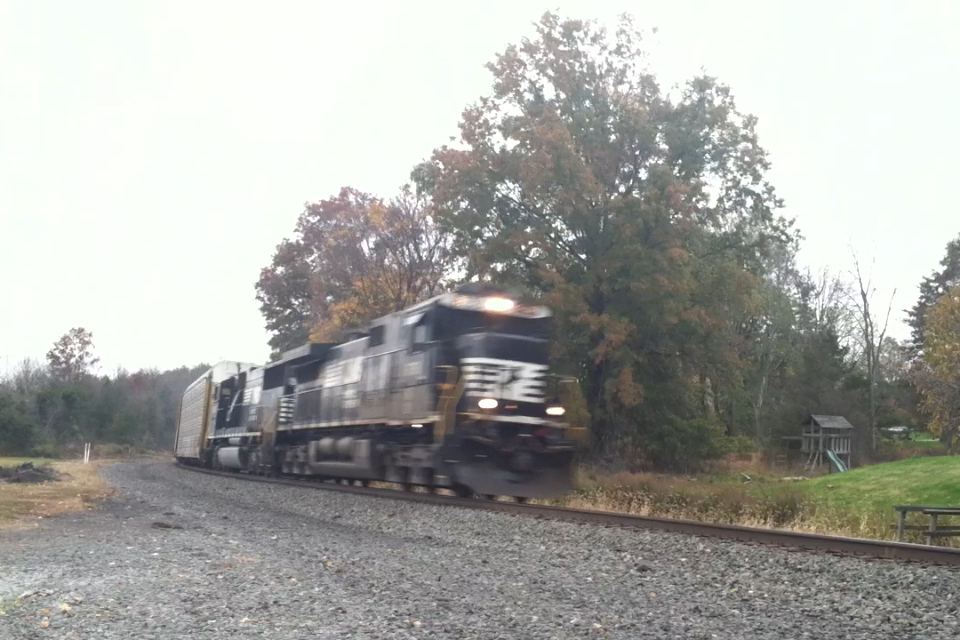
Norfolk Southern eastbound train passing through Clinton Township, New Jersey on the Lehigh Line, Picture 2

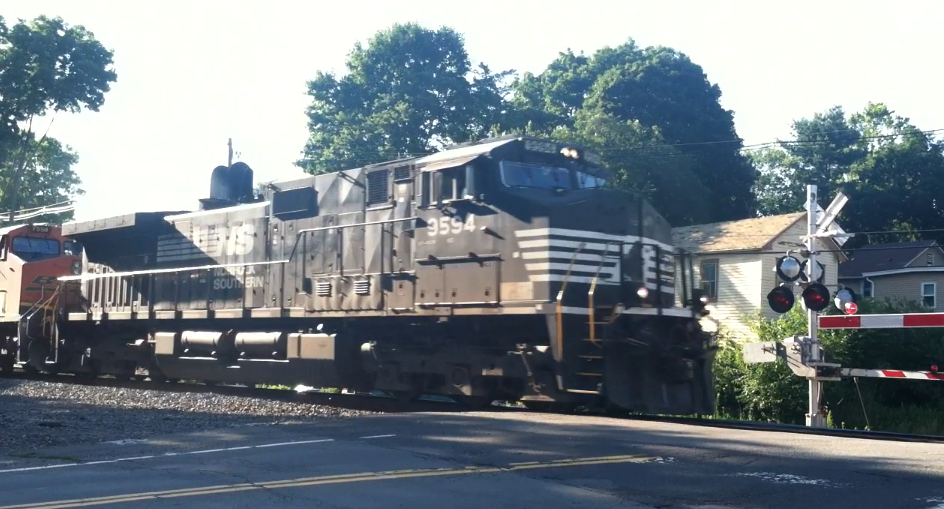
Norfolk Southern eastbound train passing through Three Bridges, Readington Township, New Jersey on the Lehigh Line, Picture 1. A BNSF GEVO can be seen trailing NS 9594.

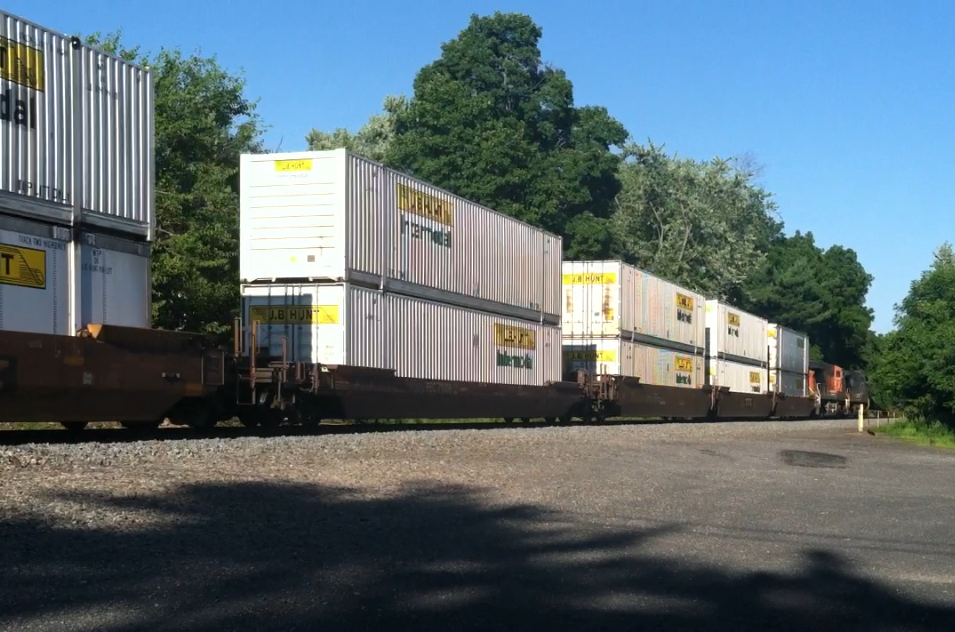
Norfolk Southern eastbound train passing through Three Bridges, Readington Township, New Jersey on the Lehigh Line, Picture 2- with J.B. Hunt intermodal

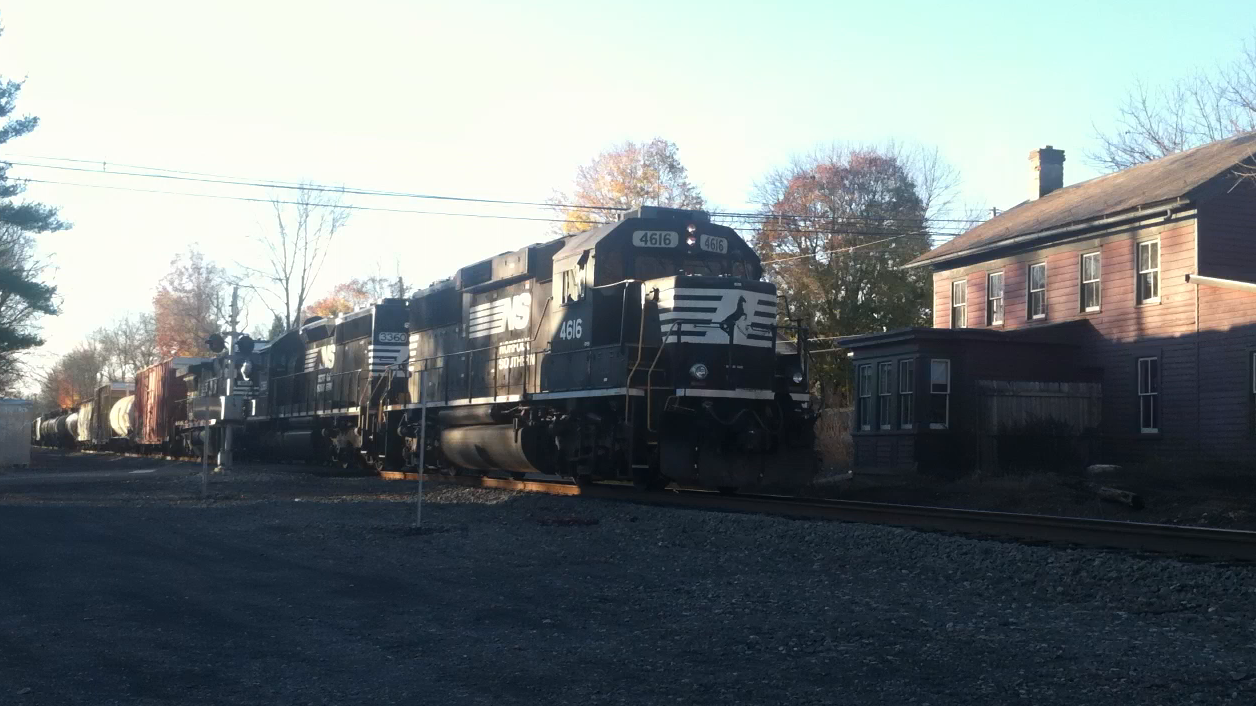
Norfolk Southern westbound delivery train passing through Three Bridges, Readington Township, New Jersey on the Lehigh Line, Picture 2- from back of train part one

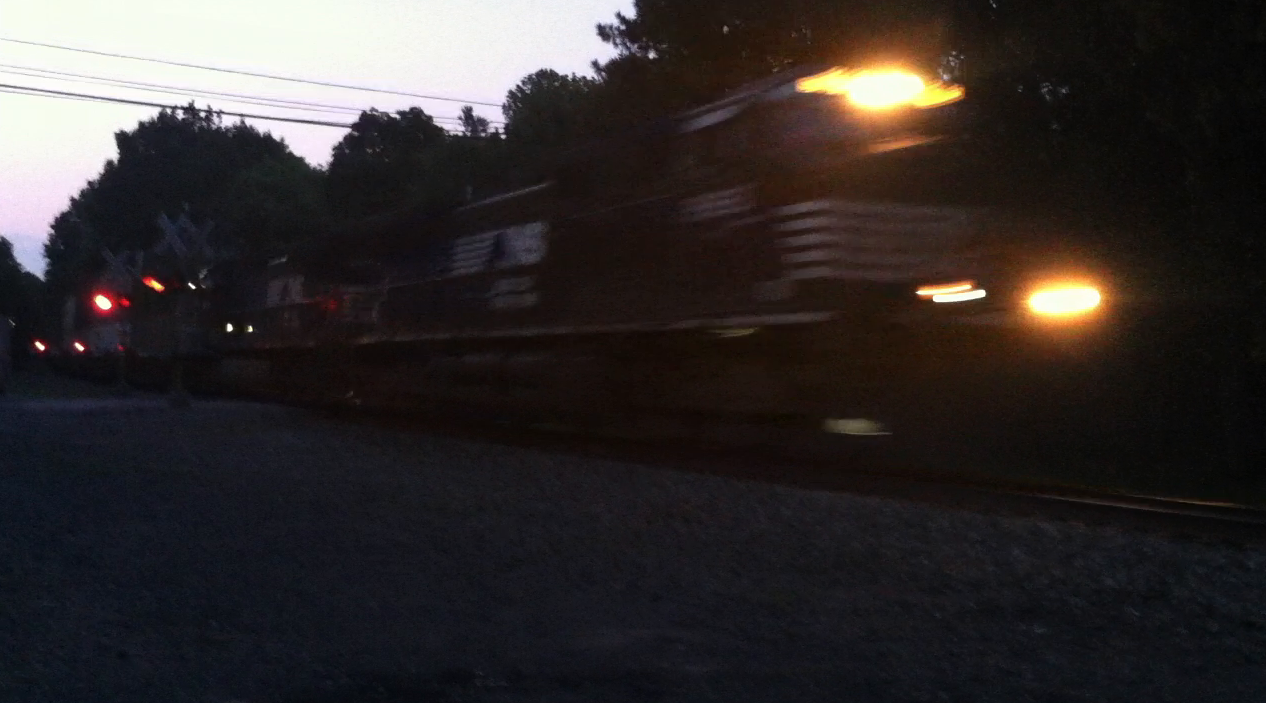
Norfolk Southern eastbound train on the Lehigh Line passing through a crossing near Flemington, New Jersey, Picture 2

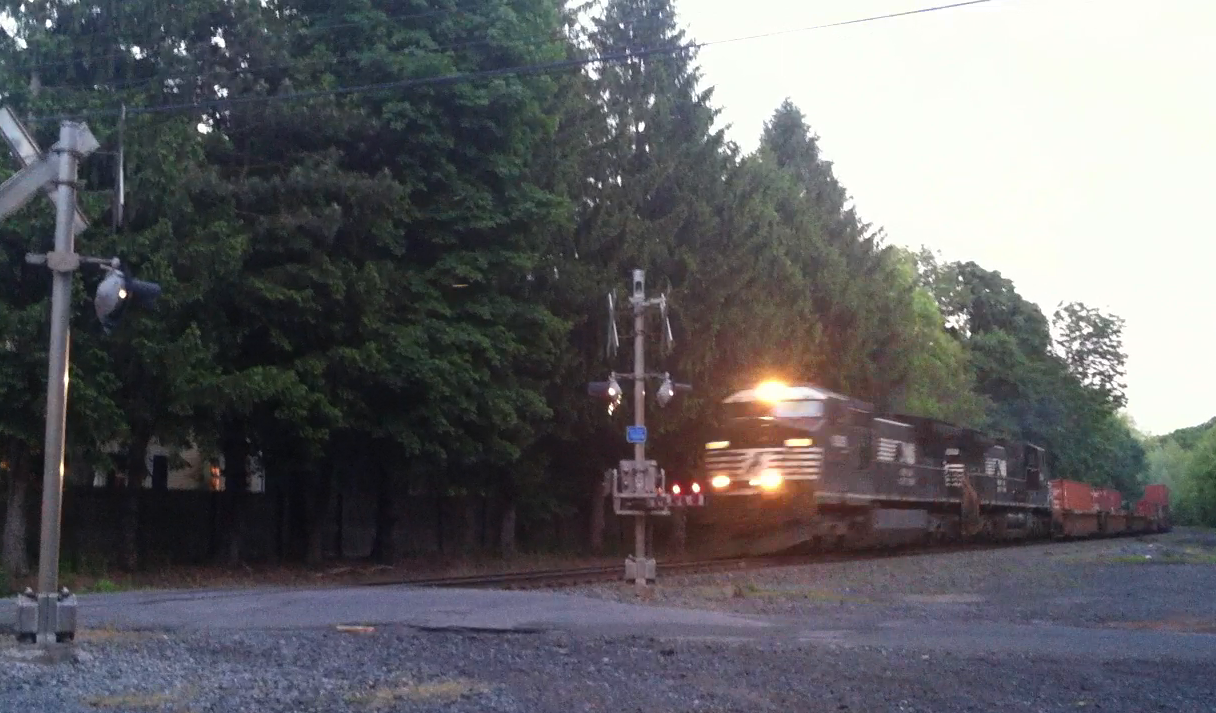
Norfolk Southern westbound train on the Lehigh Line passing through a crossing near Flemington, New Jersey, Picture 1

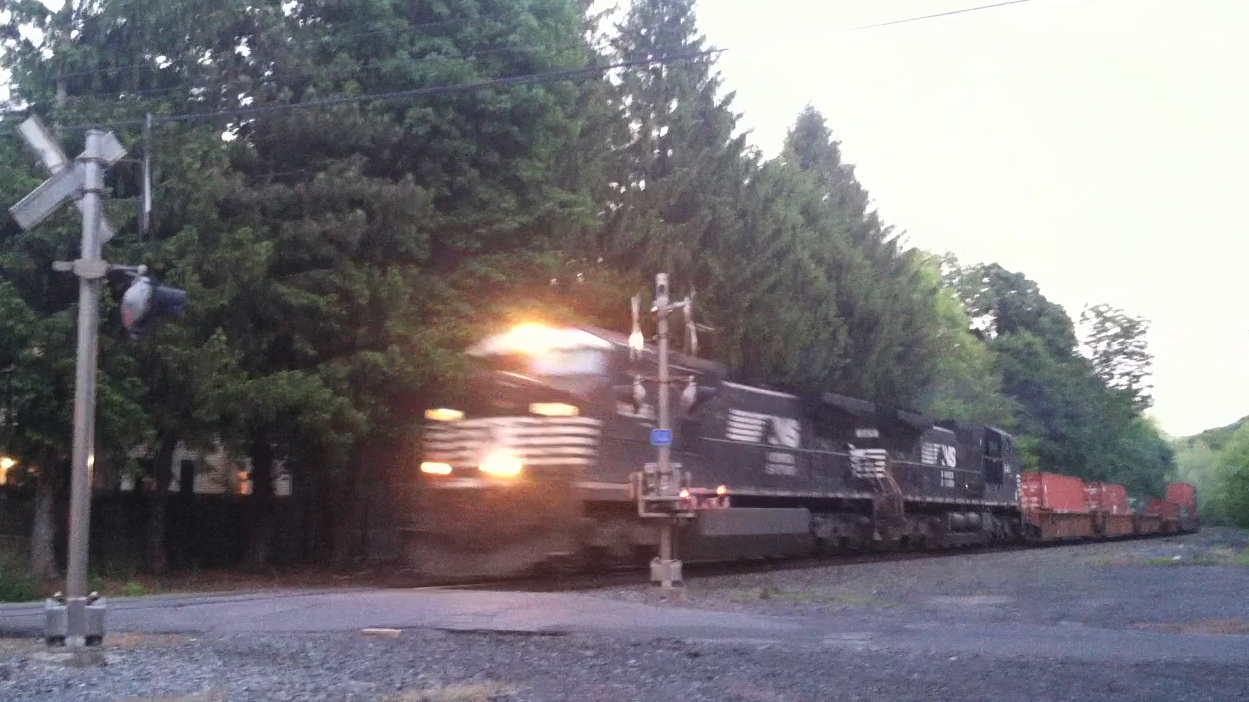
Norfolk Southern westbound train on the Lehigh Line passing through a crossing near Flemington, New Jersey, Picture 2

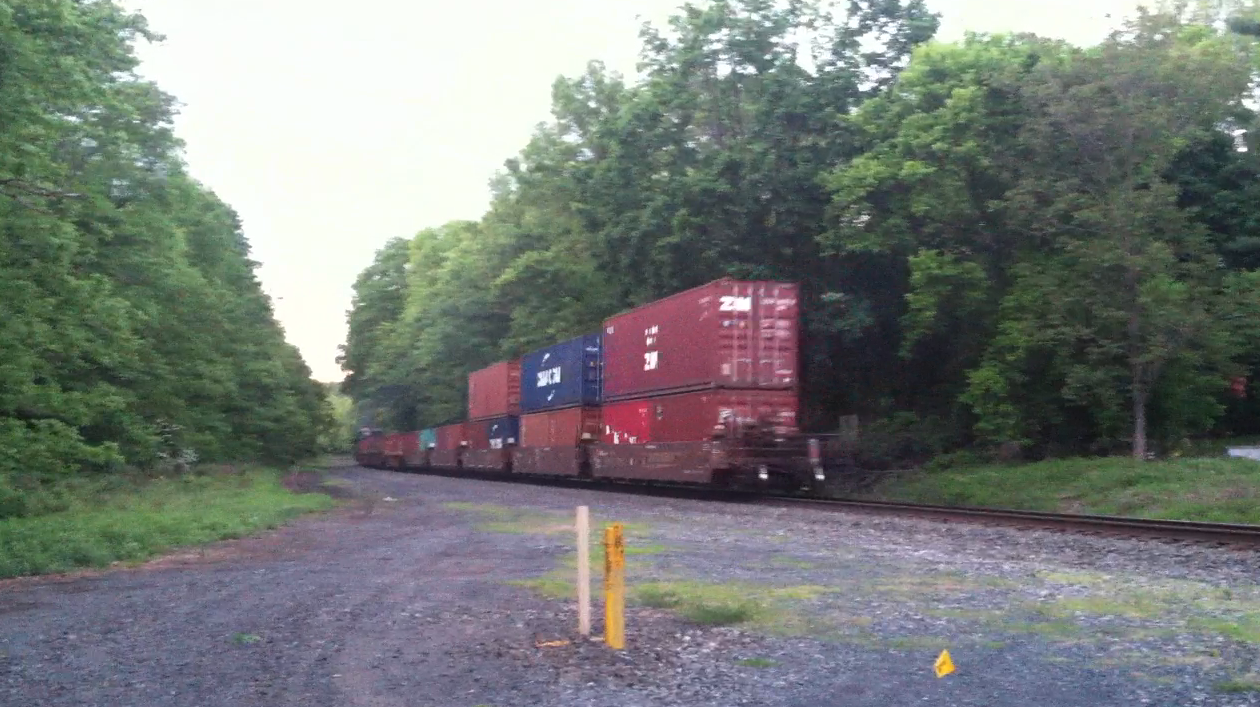
Norfolk Southern westbound train on the Lehigh Line passing through a crossing near Flemington, New Jersey, Picture 3- in back of train part one

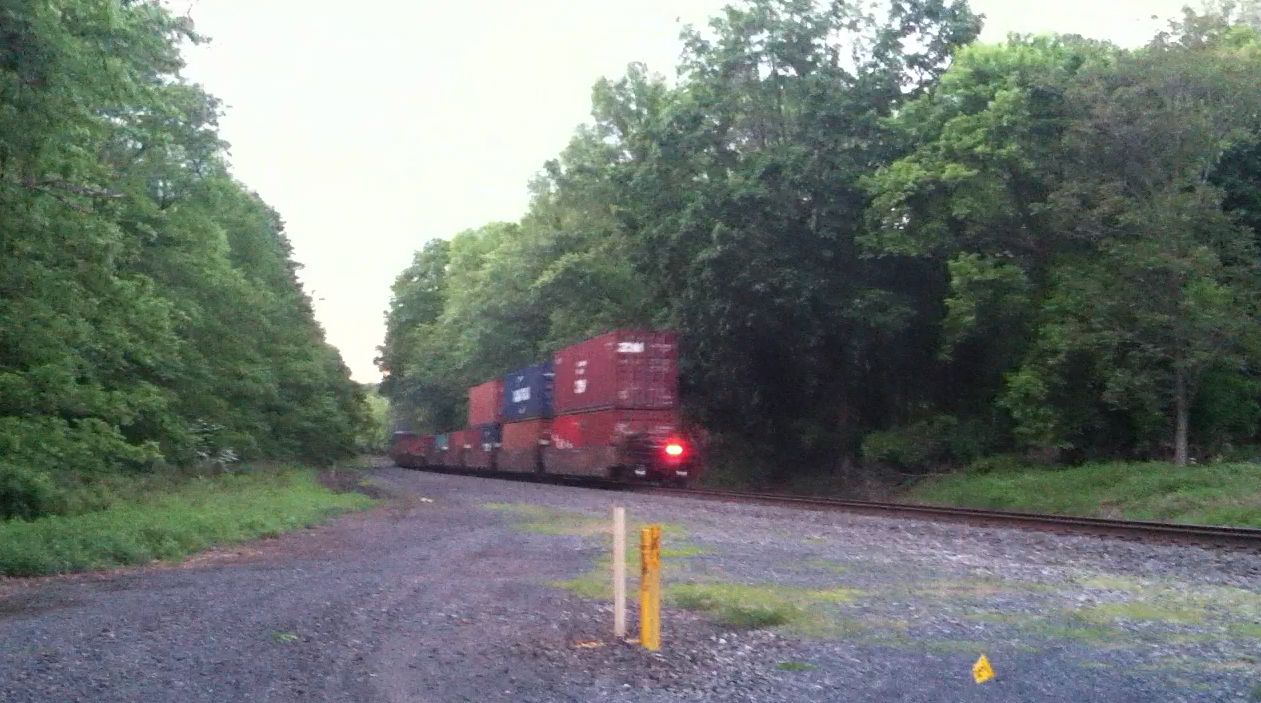
Norfolk Southern westbound train on the Lehigh Line passing through a crossing near Flemington, New Jersey, Picture 4- in back of train part two

== See also ==
- Central Railroad of New Jersey
- History of rail transport in the United States
- Lehigh and Susquehanna Railroad
- Lehigh Division
- Lehigh Valley Railroad
  - Easton and Amboy Railroad
