= Reading Division =

The Reading Division is a rail line owned and operated by the Reading Blue Mountain and Northern Railroad in the U.S. state of Pennsylvania. The line runs from Reading, Pennsylvania north and east to Packerton, Pennsylvania along former Reading Company and Central Railroad of New Jersey lines. At its south end, it connects to the Norfolk Southern Railway's Reading Line; its east end is at Norfolk Southern's Lehigh Line which parallels the R&N's Lehigh Division.

== History ==
The piece from Reading north to Port Clinton, Pennsylvania was opened by the Philadelphia and Reading Rail Road in 1842.

The line from Port Clinton to Haucks was part of the Reading Company, while from Haucks to Packerton was part of the Central Railroad of New Jersey. The lines were taken over by Conrail in 1976, and the Reading Blue Mountain and Northern Railroad bought them in 1990.
