= Three Bridges, New Jersey =

Populated place in Hunterdon County, New Jersey, US

- Unincorporated community
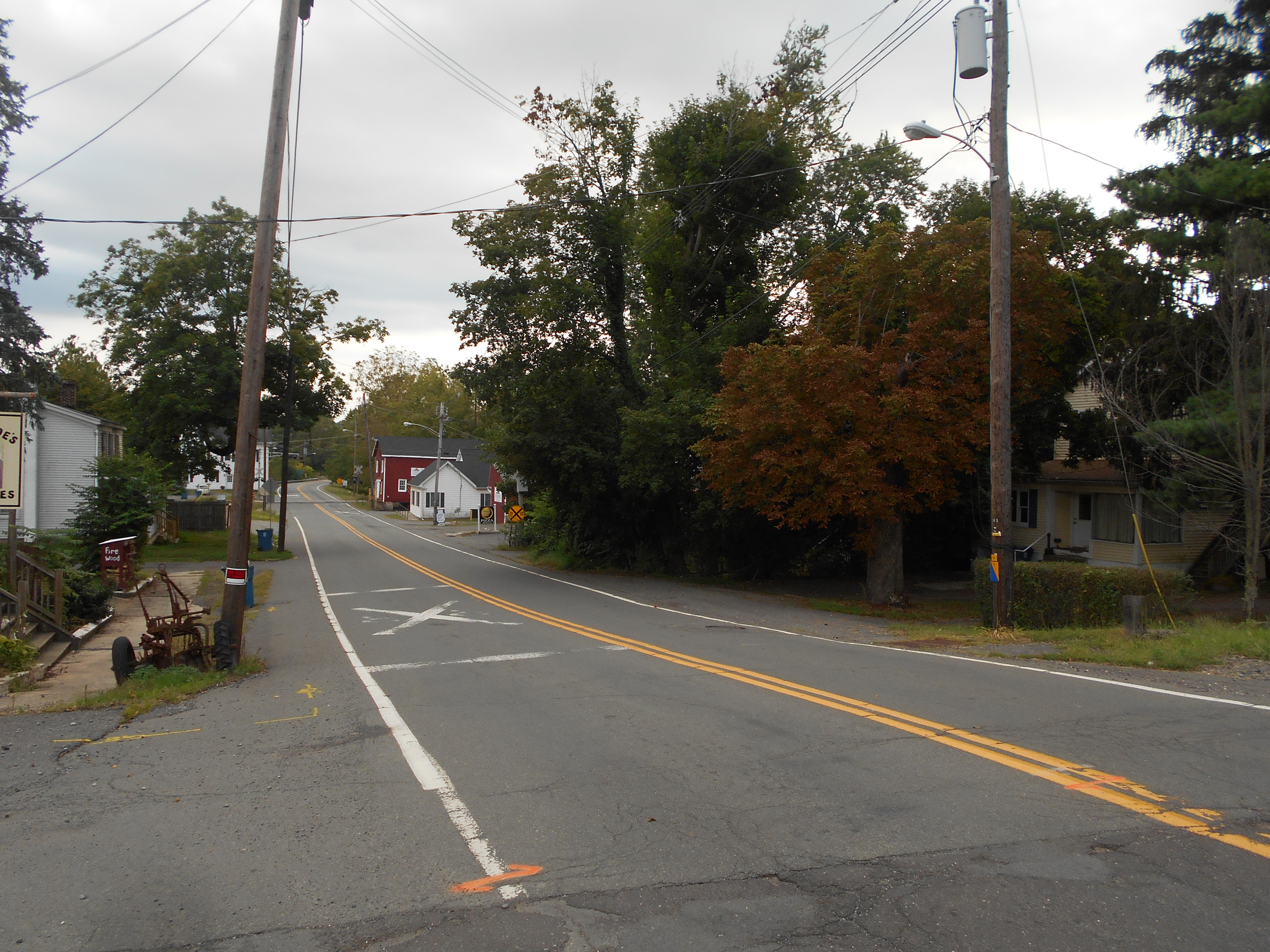
- The center of Three Bridges, seen from the Norfolk Southern Railway's Lehigh Line (former Lehigh Valley Railroad main line) tracks in August 2014

- Location in Hunterdon County Location in New Jersey Location in the United States
- Coordinates: 40°31′11″N 74°47′58″W
- Country: United States
- State: New Jersey
- County: Hunterdon
- Township: Readington

Area
  - Total: 0.54 sq mi (1.39 km^{2})
  - Land: 0.53 sq mi (1.36 km^{2})
  - Water: 0.012 sq mi (0.03 km^{2})
- Elevation: 121 ft (37 m)

Population (2020)
  - Total: 321
  - Density: 611.1/sq mi (235.96/km^{2})
- Time zone: UTC−05:00 (Eastern)
  - Summer (DST): UTC−04:00 (Eastern)
- FIPS code: 34-72870
- GNIS feature ID: 881171

Three Bridges is an unincorporated community and census-designated place (CDP) located within Readington Township in Hunterdon County, in the U.S. state of New Jersey, on the South Branch Raritan River. It is named for the three original bridges which crossed the river. As of the 2020 census, Three Bridges had a population of 321.

Farmers John Vlerebone and Harriet Foster Cline were original land owners in the area of Three Bridges. They eventually sold some land to the Central Railroad of New Jersey for its South Branch Line which passed on to the Black River and Western Railroad. Vlerebone and Kline subdivided their land along Old York Road after 1864.

In 1875 the Lehigh Valley Railroad built the New Jersey extension of its main line through Three Bridges using its Easton and Amboy Railroad subsidiary where it still runs today now owned by Norfolk Southern Railway. Numerous lines for shipping produce and a number of daily passenger lines stopped in the village in its heyday. Many of the businesses left along with the passenger lines. Today the village houses a post office, bank, a branch of the Hunterdon County Library System and several other businesses.

== Demographics ==
Historical population
Census	Pop.	Note	%±
2020	321		—
U.S. Decennial Census

Three Bridges first appeared as a census designated place in the 2020 U.S. census.

Three Bridges CDP, New Jersey – Racial and ethnic composition Note: the US Census treats Hispanic/Latino as an ethnic category. This table excludes Latinos from the racial categories and assigns them to a separate category. Hispanics/Latinos may be of any race.
Race / Ethnicity (NH = Non-Hispanic)	Pop 2020	2020
White alone (NH)	254	79.13%
Black or African American alone (NH)	12	3.74%
Native American or Alaska Native alone (NH)	0	0.00%
Asian alone (NH)	14	4.36%
Native Hawaiian or Pacific Islander alone (NH)	0	0.00%
Other race alone (NH)	0	0.00%
Mixed race or Multiracial (NH)	13	4.05%
Hispanic or Latino (any race)	28	8.72%
Total	321	100.00%
