= Lehigh Township, Carbon County, Pennsylvania =

Township in Pennsylvania, US

Lehigh Township
- Township
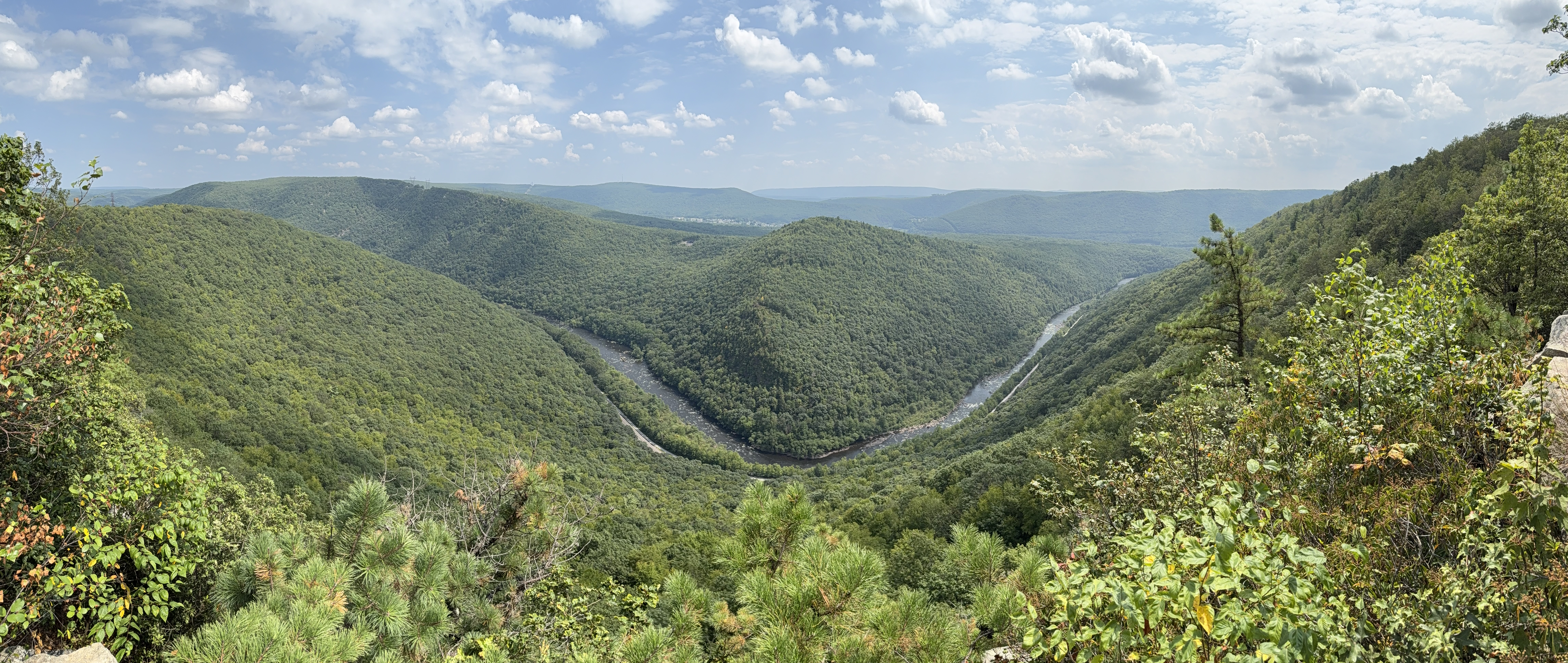
- View of the Lehigh Gorge from Broad Mountain Overlook in Lehigh Township

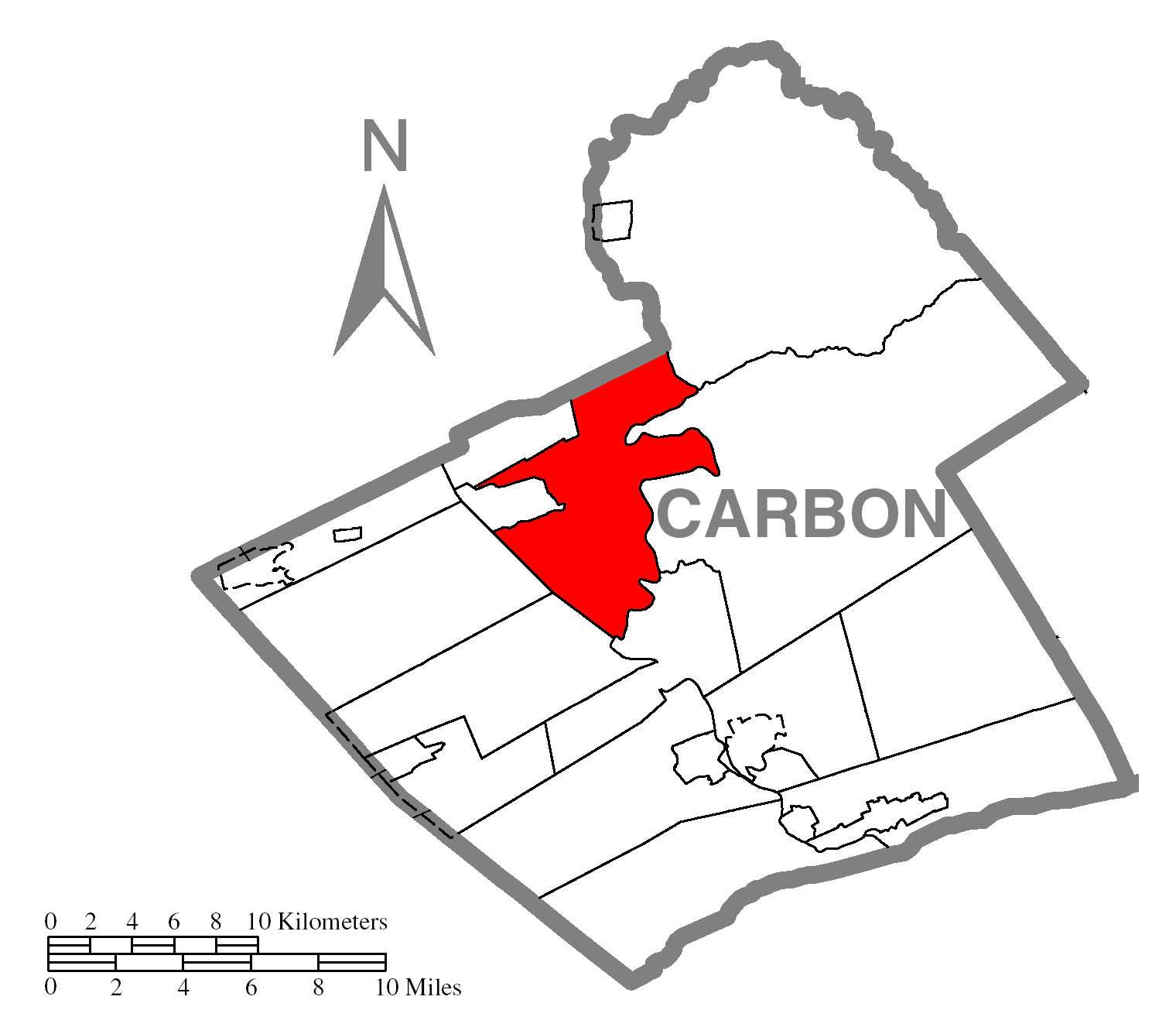
- Location of Lehigh Township in Carbon County, Pennsylvania

- Location of Carbon County in Pennsylvania
- Coordinates: 40°55′00″N 75°47′29″W
- Country: United States
- State: Pennsylvania
- County: Carbon

Area
  - Total: 26.45 sq mi (68.51 km^{2})
  - Land: 26.15 sq mi (67.74 km^{2})
  - Water: 0.30 sq mi (0.77 km^{2})
- Elevation: 1,683 ft (513 m)

Population (2010)
  - Total: 479
  - Estimate (2016): 475
  - Density: 18.2/sq mi (7.01/km^{2})
- Time zone: UTC-5 (EST)
  - Summer (DST): UTC-4 (EDT)
- Area code: 570
- FIPS code: 42-025-42400

Lehigh Township is a township in Carbon County, Pennsylvania. It is part of Northeastern Pennsylvania.

The population was 479 at the time of the 2010 census.

== History ==
The area of Carbon County, Pennsylvania that is present-day Lehigh Township was considered to be part of Lausanne Township from 1808 until 1875. It was during that year that it became known as Lehigh Township.

In 1808, a tract of forested land near the Lehigh River was owned by members of the Moravian Church. In 1824, Lehigh Coal & Navigation Company executives purchased the lumber rights to that land and built four sawmills, housing for its workers and a town store on the land in order to establish a lumber harvesting operation to support the company's coal barge construction efforts. That first town was known as Lowrytown; it would later be known as Rockport.

== Geography ==
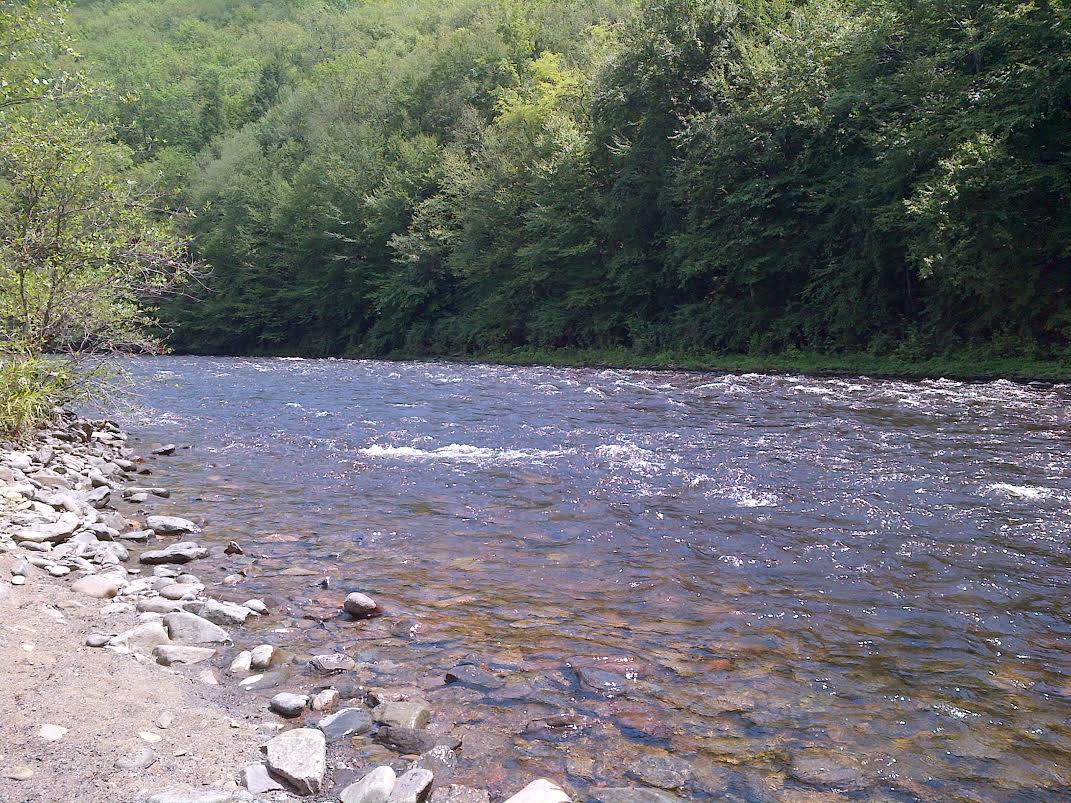
The Lehigh River in Lehigh Township in August 2015

The township is located in north-central Carbon County and is bordered to the north partially by Luzerne County. The Lehigh River forms the winding eastern border of the township, carving a gorge up to 1,000 feet (300 m) deep.

The township's villages include Leslie Run and Rockport. The borough of Weatherly is on the western side of the township but is a separate municipality.

According to the U.S. Census Bureau, Lehigh Township has a total area of 26.4 square miles (68.5 km^{2}), of which 26.1 square miles (67.7 km^{2}) is land and 0.3 square miles (0.8 km^{2}), or 1.12%, is water.

The township has a warm-summer humid continental climate (Dfb) and the hardiness zones are 5b and 6a. Average monthly temperatures in Rockport range from 25.2 °F in January to 69.9 °F in July.

== Demographics ==
Historical population
| Census | Pop. | Note | %± |
|---|---|---|---|
| 2010 | 479 | | — |
| 2016 (est.) | 475 | | −0.8% |
U.S. Decennial Census

As of the 2000 census, there were 527 people, 193 households, and 156 families residing in the township.

The population density was 20.1 people per square mile (7.8/km^{2}). There were 237 housing units at an average density of 9.0/sq mi (3.5/km^{2}).

The racial makeup of the township was 97.91% White, 1.71% Native American, 0.19% Asian, and 0.19% from two or more races. Hispanic or Latino of any race were 0.76% of the population.

There were 193 households, out of which 31.6% had children under the age of eighteen living with them; 66.8% were married couples living together, 8.8% had a female householder with no husband present, and 18.7% were non-families. 16.6% of all households were made up of individuals, and 7.8% had someone living alone who was sixty-five years of age or older.

The average household size was 2.66 and the average family size was 2.92.

In the township, the population was spread out, with 24.1% under the age of eighteen, 6.1% from eighteen to twenty-four, 26.6% from twenty-five to forty-four, 27.3% from forty-five to sixty-four, and 15.9% who were sixty-five years of age or older. The median age was forty-one years.

For every one hundred females, there were 90.3 males. For every one hundred females who were aged eighteen and over, there were 95.1 males.

The median income for a household in the township was $40,000, and the median income for a family was $43,333. Males had a median income of $32,083 compared with that of $26,042 for females.

The per capita income for the township was $17,883.

Roughly 8.0% of families and 10.8% of the population were living below the poverty line, including 19.8% of those who were under the age of eighteen and 9.3% of those who were aged sixty-five or over.

== Transportation ==
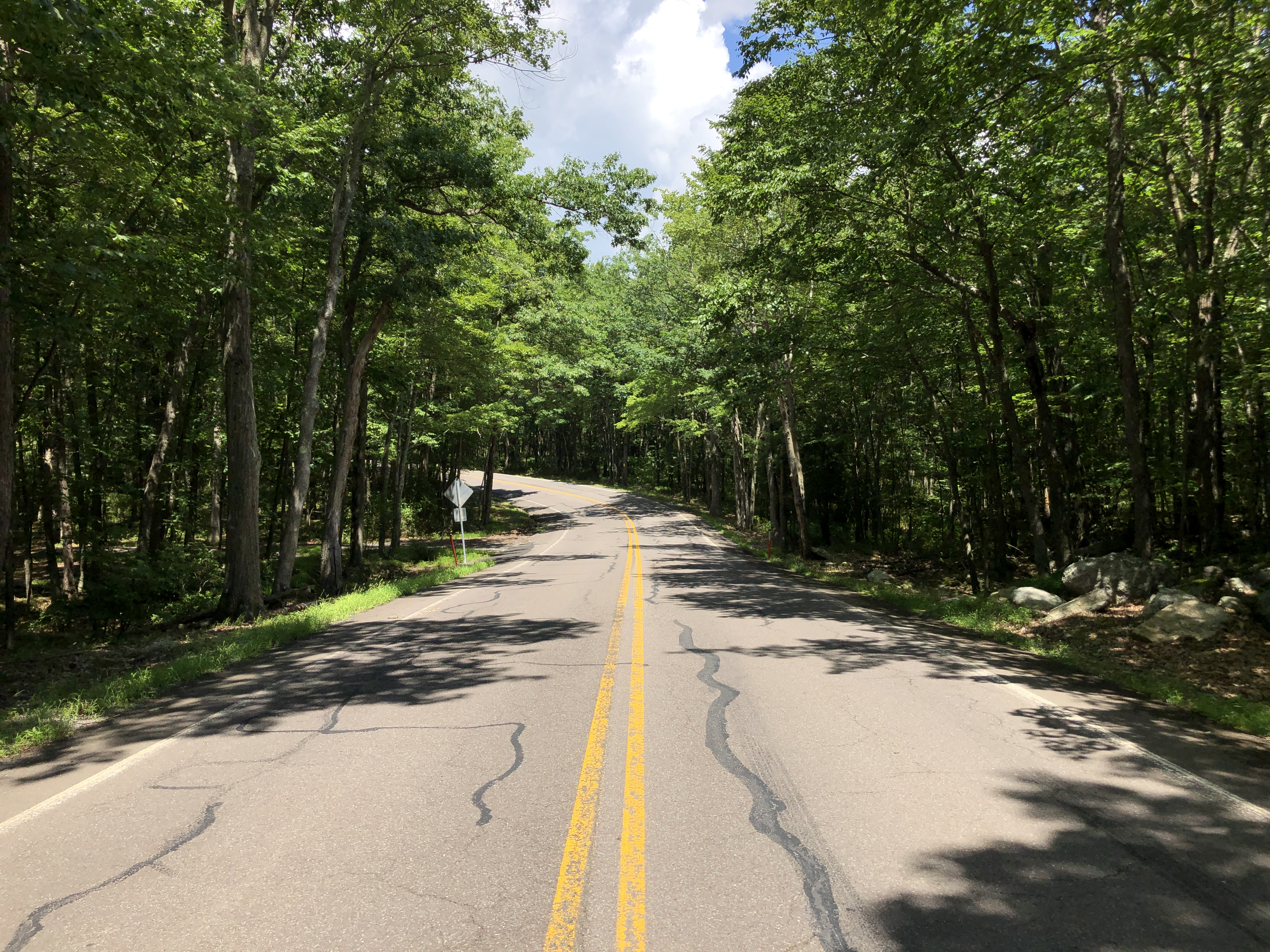
Buck Mountain Road in Lehigh Township

As of 2020, there were 14.09 miles (22.68 km) of public roads in Lehigh Township, of which 9.00 miles (14.48 km) were maintained by the Pennsylvania Department of Transportation (PennDOT) and 5.09 miles (8.19 km) were maintained by the township.

Main thoroughfares through the township include Buck Mountain Road, Lehigh Gorge Drive, Leslie Run Road, and Rockport Road.

During the 19th century, the Commonwealth of Pennsylvania built the first road through what would ultimately become Lehigh Township. A state road, it began at the segment of the Lehigh and Susquehanna Turnpike where the Spring Mountain House was located, and proceeded through the borough of Weatherly and on to White Haven.

In 1840, construction of the White Haven and Lausanne Turnpike was begun with work on the turnpike segment between the Compton House to Morrison's finished in 1841.

The Lehigh Valley Railroad and the Philadelphia and Reading Railroad established lines in the township during this century.
