= Double stack =

Double stack may refer to:

- Double-stack rail transport — trains with two layers of containers.
- A guitar amplifier configuration
- Dual IP stack implementation, in Internet Protocol version 6
- A well car
- A type of pit stop strategy in motorsport
