= AREMA =

AREMA may refer to:

- American Railway Engineering and Maintenance-of-Way Association, a North American railway industry group
- Arema F.C., a football club based in Malang, Indonesia
- Antoko Revolisionera Malagasy (literally "Malagasy Revolutionary Party"), a political party in Madagascar
