= Intermodal car =

An intermodal car is a type of rail vehicle, which may refer to:

- A railroad car specifically designed for transporting intermodal containers
- A well car, capable of double-stacking intermodal containers
- A generic flatcar re-purposed for container transport
- A spine car
