= Double-stack rail transport =

Railroad cars carrying two layers of intermodal containers

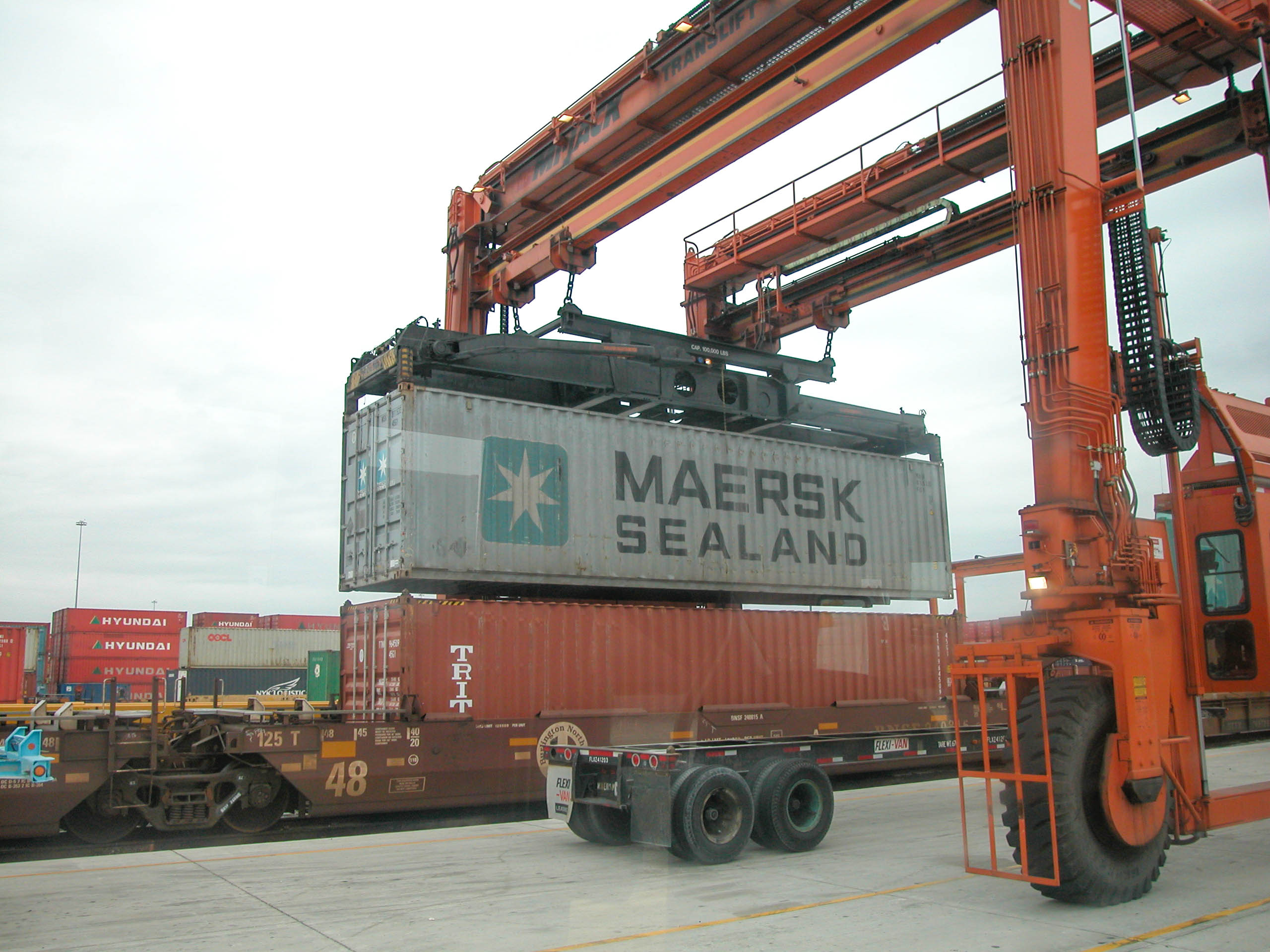
Rubber-tired gantry crane double-stacking a 40-foot container

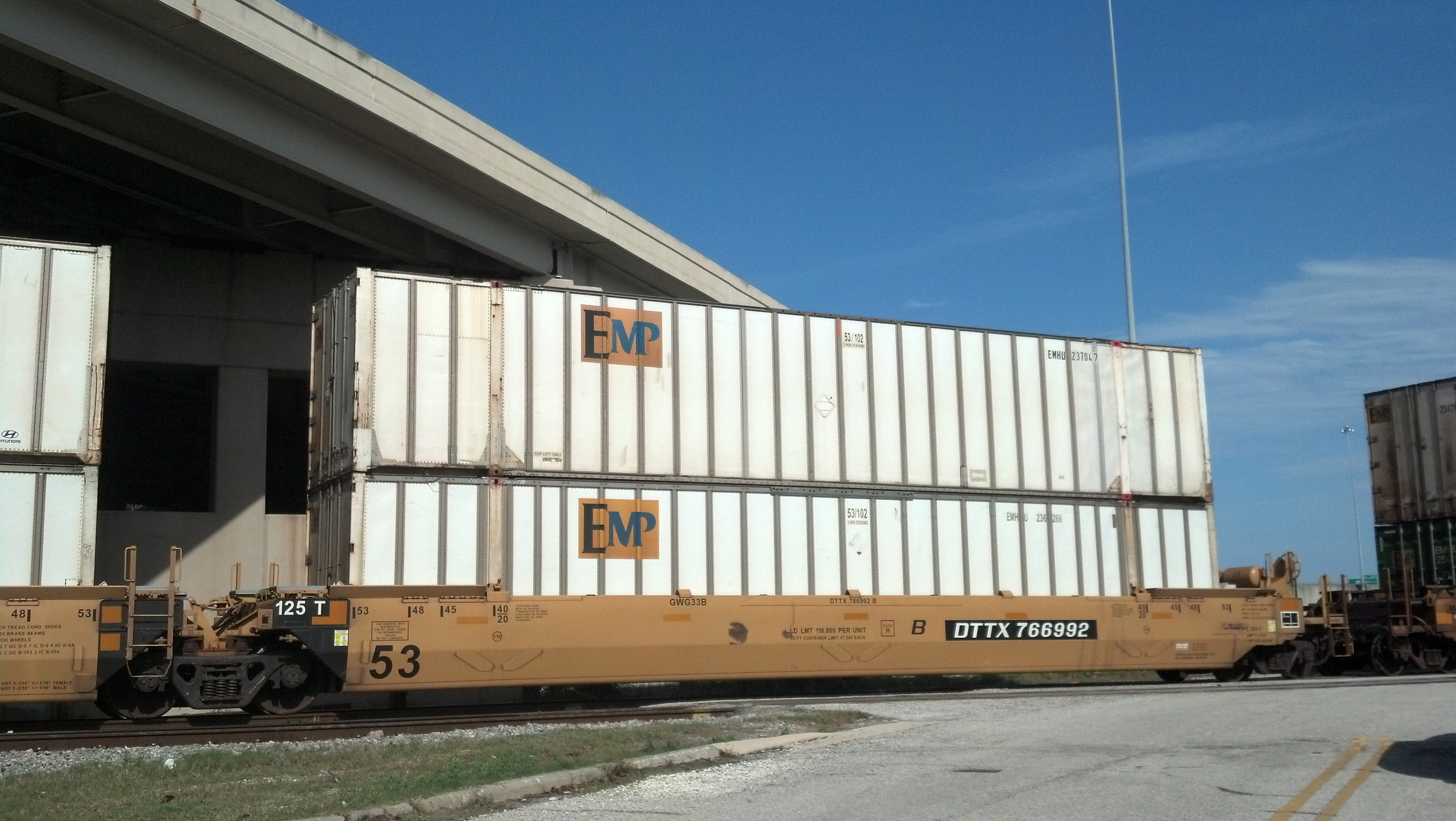
A container train passing through Jacksonville, Florida, US, with 53 ft (16 m) containers used for shipments within North America

Double-stack rail transport is a form of intermodal freight transport in which railroad cars carry two layers of intermodal containers. Invented in the United States in 1984, it is now being used for nearly 70% of US intermodal shipments. Using double-stack technology, a freight train of a given length can carry roughly twice as many containers, sharply reducing transport costs per container. On North American railroads, special well cars are used for double-stack shipment to reduce the needed vertical clearance and to lower the center of gravity of a loaded car. In addition, the well car design reduces damage in transit and provides greater cargo security by cradling the lower containers so their doors cannot be opened. A succession of larger container sizes have been introduced to further increase shipping productivity in the United States.

Double-stack rail operations are growing in other parts of the world, but are often constrained by clearance and other infrastructure limitations.

== History ==
Southern Pacific Railroad (SP), and Robert Ingram, of SeaLand, debuted the double-stack intermodal car in 1977. SP and Ingram jointly designed the first car with ACF Industries in 1976. At first it was slow to become an industry standard, then in 1984 American President Lines started working with the Union Pacific Railroad. That same year, the first all double-stack train left Los Angeles, California, for South Kearny, New Jersey, United States, under the name of "Stacktrain" rail service. Along the way the train transferred from the UP to the Chicago and North Western Railway and then to Conrail.

== Sizes and clearances ==
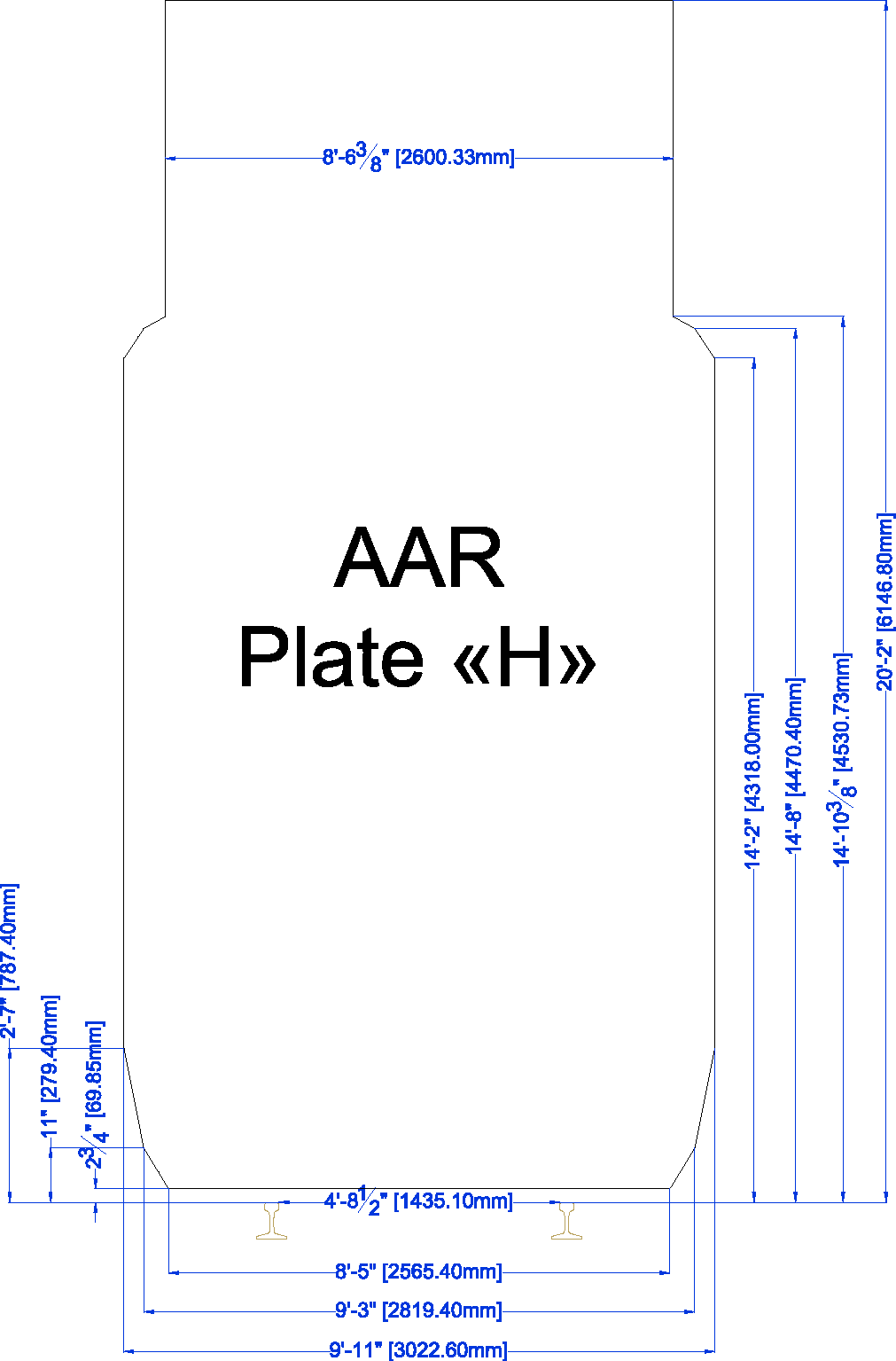
AAR Plate-H loading gauge

Double-stack cars come in a number of sizes, related to the standard sizes of the containers they are designed to carry. Well lengths of 12.19 m (40.0 ft), 14.63 m (48.0 ft) and 16.15 m (53.0 ft) are most common. Heights range from 2.44 m (8 ft 0 in) to 2.908 m (9 ft 6 1/2 in) ("high cube").

Double stack requires a higher clearance above the tracks, or structure gauge, than do other forms of rail freight. Double-stack cars are most common in North America, where intermodal traffic is heavy and electrification is less widespread; thus overhead clearances are typically more manageable. Nonetheless, North American railroads invested large sums to raise bridges and tunnel clearances along their routes and remove other obstacles to allow greater use of double-stack trains and to give them more direct routes. Outside North America some rail routes have been built or upgraded to such standards as to allow both electrification with overhead wires and double stacking.

CSX lists three clearance heights above top of rail for double stack service:

- Doublestack 1 — 18 ft 2 in (5.54 m)
- Doublestack 2 — 19 ft 2 in (5.84 m)
- Doublestack 3 — 20 ft 2 in (6.15 m)
- Doublestack 4 — 20 ft 3 in (6.17 m)

The last two clearances offer the most flexibility, allowing two high cube containers to be stacked.

== Stacking containers ==
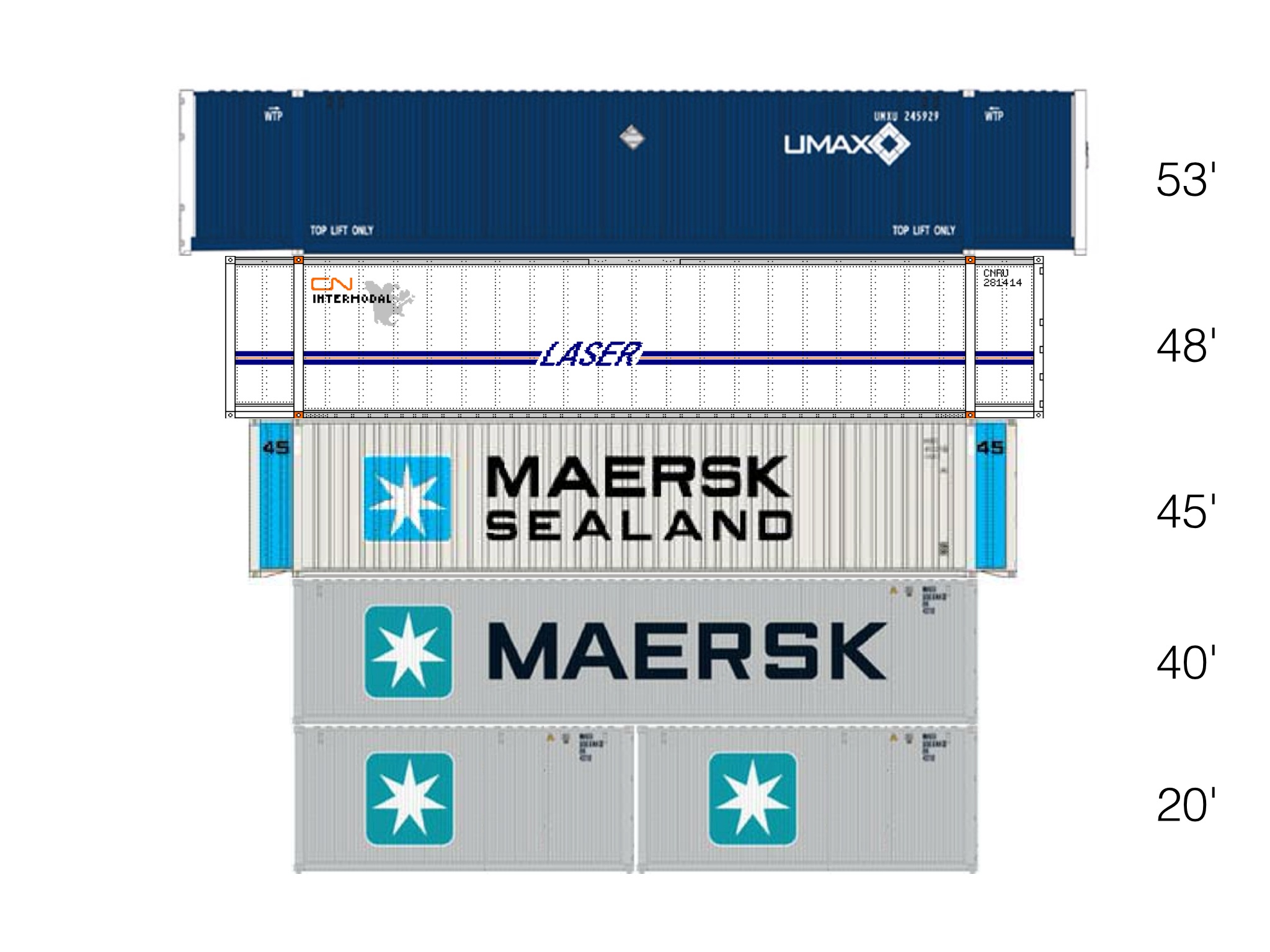
Load bearing of container stacking is at the 40-foot coupling

Forty-foot containers are the standard unit length, and load bearing points are at the ends of such containers. Longer containers, such as 45, 48 and 53 feet long, still have the load-bearing points 40 feet apart, with the excess protruding equally outside this length. Therefore, 40-foot containers or larger can be stacked on 20-foot containers if there are two 20-foot containers in a row; however, 20-foot containers cannot be stacked on top of 40-foot or longer containers. The possible double-stacking patterns are:

- Two 20 ft in lower and one 40 ft (or longer) in upper stack (allowed in India, China, US)
- One 40 ft in lower and another 40 ft (or longer) in upper stack (allowed in India, US)
- Two 20 ft in lower and another set of two 20 ft in upper stack.

The container coupling holes are all female and double-male twistlocks are required to securely mate container stacks.

== Dwarf containers ==
China had started to experiment using reduced-size containers to be stacked on to normal containers to allow transport under 25 kV overhead line electrification.

India has started to build a series of dwarf container for domestic transport to be run under 25 kV electrification. With a height of 6 feet 4 inches (1,930 mm) they are 662 mm shorter than ISO shipping containers but 162 mm wider, while still allowing for 67% more capacity when double stacked as compared to single-stack ISO container. The width is comparable to that of North American 53-foot containers.

== Weights ==
Containers have weight limits designed to allow their transport by road trucks, which have lower weight limits than trains. Outside the U.S., a common limit for railways is 8 tonnes per metre (8.1 short ton/yd; 7.2 long ton/yd) train length and 22.5 tonnes (22.1 long tons; 24.8 short tons) per axle. A four-axle container car can take 90 tonnes (99.2 short tons; 88.6 long tons). Since a container is limited to 30.5 tonnes (33.6 short tons; 30.0 long tons), even including the empty weight of the rail car, single stacking uses only part of the load capacity of the railway. A 20-foot (6.1 m) container is limited to 24 tonnes (26.5 short tons; 23.6 long tons) and two such can fit into a car for a 40-foot (12.2 m) container, or even three if double-stacking, but not four unless very high axle load is permitted. The North American railways permit two 53-foot (16.15 m) containers as shown in the images in this article.

Another consideration is the maximum weight of a train. A maximum-length train in Europe, 750 m (2,461 ft) long can have 50 container cars with a total weight of 2,250 tonnes (2,480 short tons; 2,210 long tons), and more if 20 ft containers are included. This is not far from the limit using standard European (freight) couplers.

== Operations ==
=== North America ===
Intermodal containers shipped by rail within North America are primarily 53 feet (16.15 m) long, with trailer-on-flatcar (TOFC) units used as well. The 53-foot length reflects a common maximum length for highway semi-trailers, which varies by province, territory and state. Major domestic intermodal carriers include:

- J. B. Hunt
- Swift
- Schneider National
- Hub Group

Containers shipped between North America and other continents consist of mostly 40-foot (12.19 m) and some 45-foot (13.72 m) and 20-foot (6.10 m) containers. Container ships only take 40s, 20s and also 45s above deck. 90% of the containers that these ships carry are 40-footers and 90% of the world's freight moves on container ships; so 81% of the world's freight moves by 40-foot containers. Most of these 40-foot containers are owned by non-U.S. companies like Maersk, MSC, and CMA CGM. The few U.S. 40-foot container companies are leasing companies like Textainer, Triton International, and CAI Leasing.

Low bridges and narrow tunnels in various locations prevent the operation of double-stack trains until expensive upgrades are made. Some Class I railroad companies, often in partnership with government agencies, have implemented improvement programs to remove obstructions to double-stack trains. Double-stack projects include:

- Heartland Corridor (Norfolk Southern Railway) — $320 million
- Norfolk Southern Crescent Corridor — $2.5 billion (estimate)
- National Gateway (CSX Transportation) — $700 million
- Commonwealth Railway — $69 million
- Chicago Region Environmental and Transportation Efficiency Program — $3 billion (estimate)
- Cross-Harbor Rail Tunnel proposed to connect rail freight lines in New Jersey with Long Island, New York. — $10 billion–14 billion (estimate)
- Continental Rail Gateway (Canadian Pacific Railway), proposed tunnel between Detroit, Michigan, United States, and Windsor, Ontario, Canada, to replace the existing Michigan Central Railway Tunnel. — $400 million
Gallery

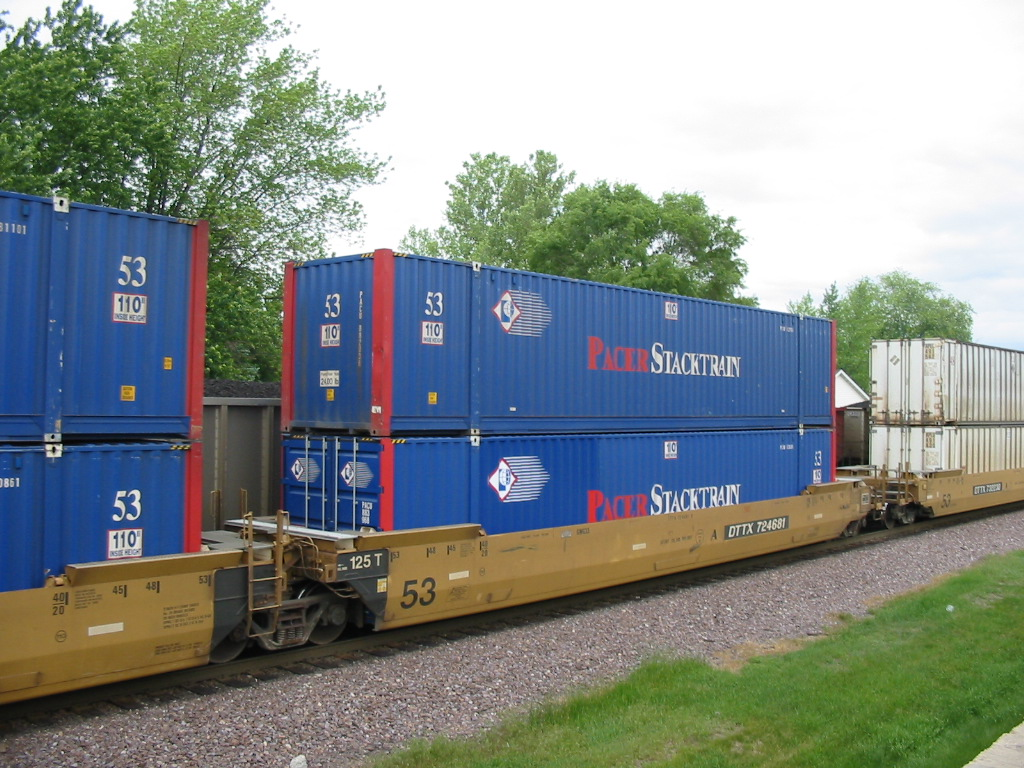
Part of a double-stack train, with 53-foot containers

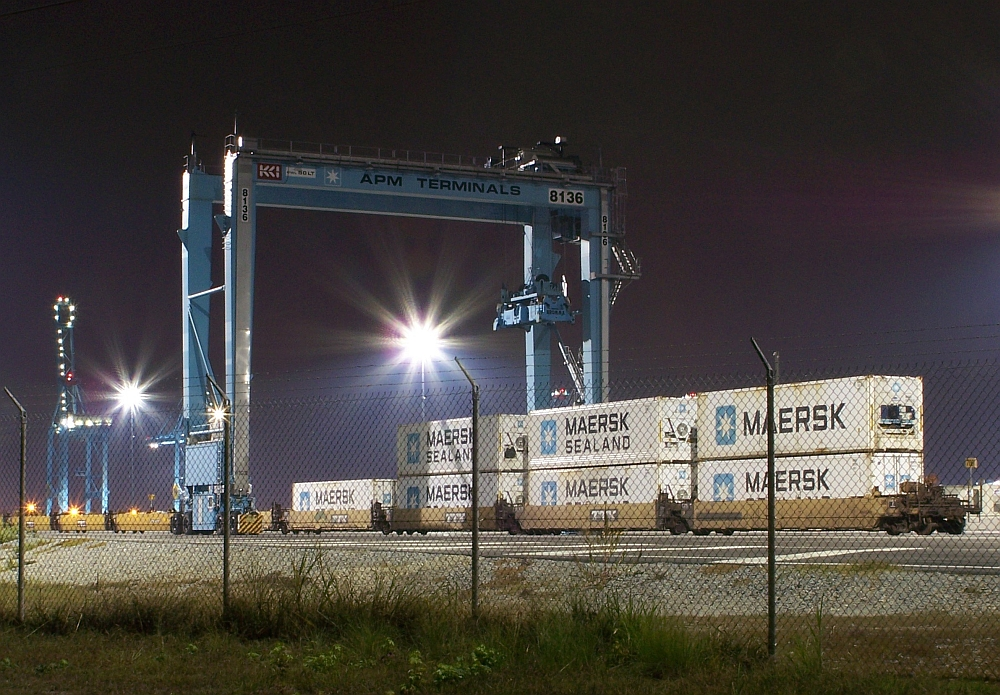
Double-stack train loaded at APM Terminals in Portsmouth, Virginia, US

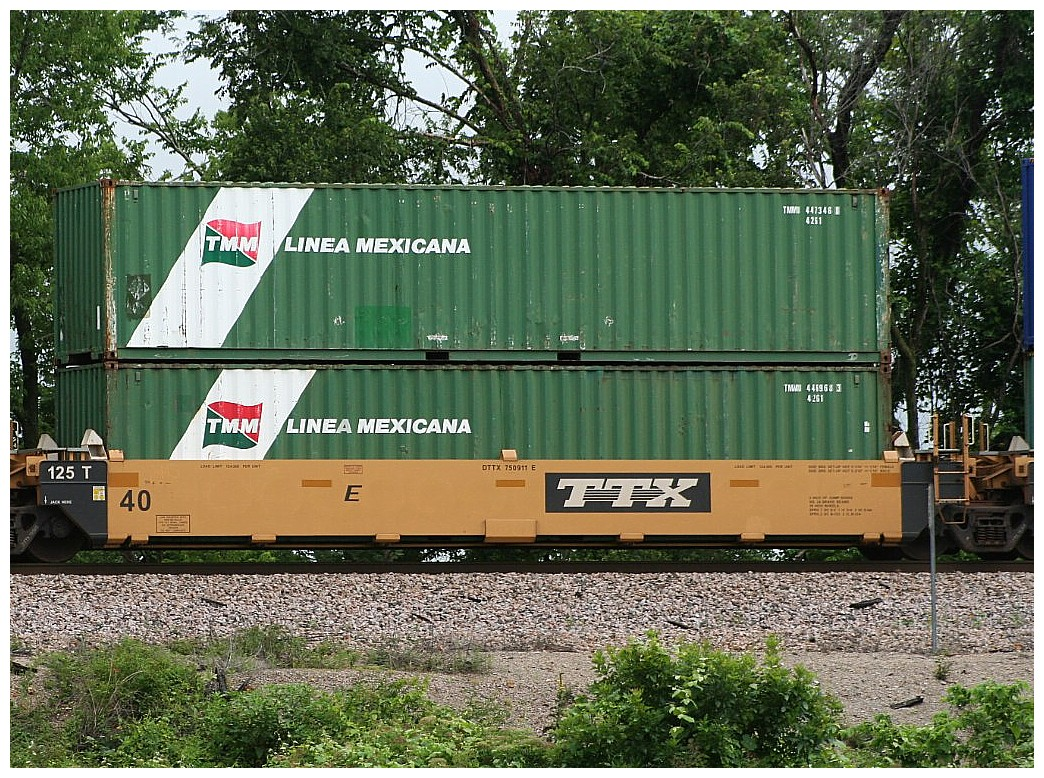
Transportación marítima mexicana (TMM) containers on a double-stack well car, 2008

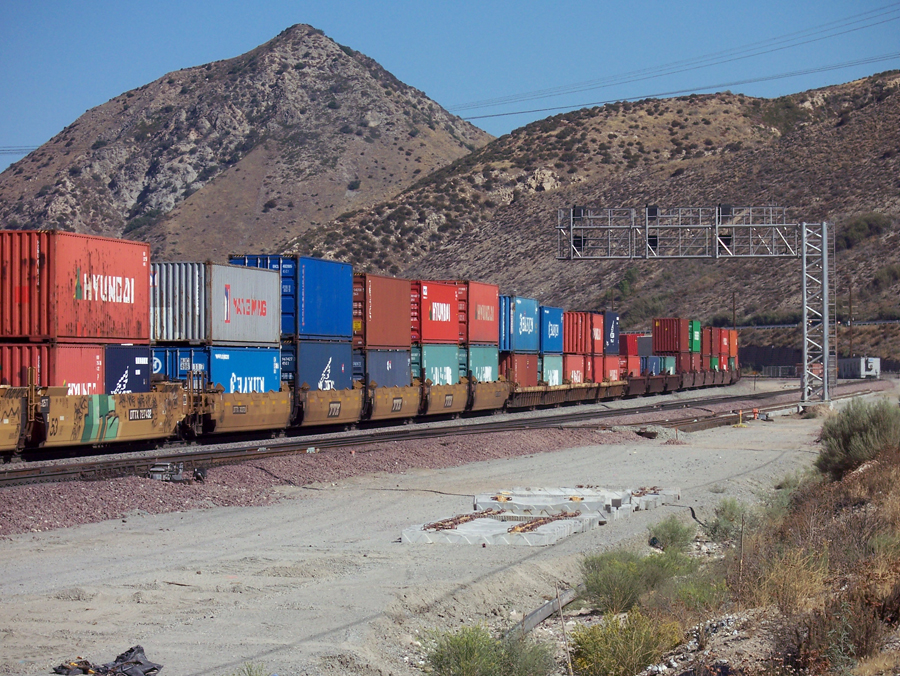
A BNSF double-stack train passing through Cajon Pass in California, US, with a mix of 20-foot and 40-foot containers

=== Outside North America ===
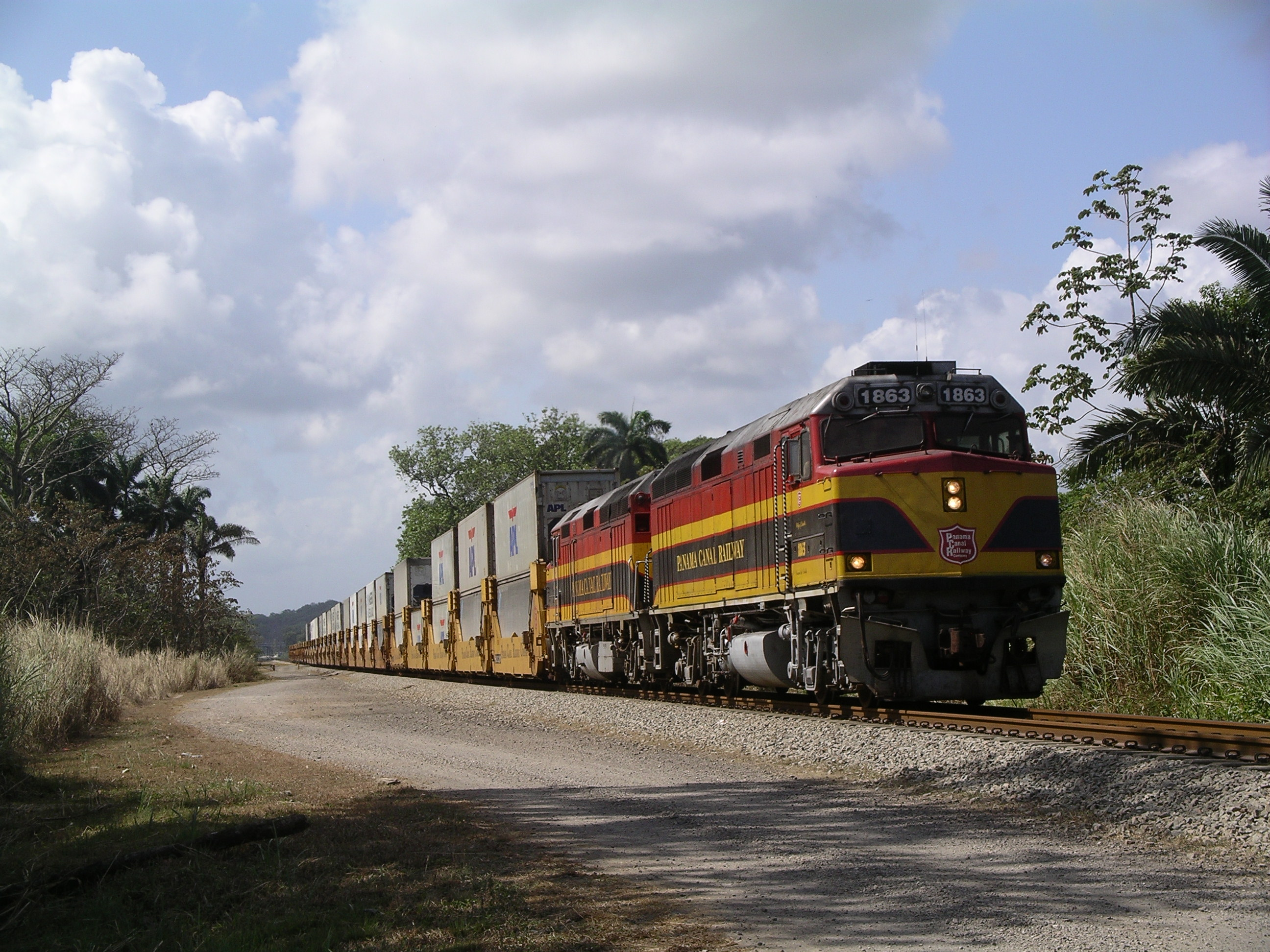
Double stack train on the Panama Canal Railway

On the vast majority of its network, Europe has more restricted loading gauge and train weight limits as well as axle load limits. In other words, many bridges and tunnels are too low for double-stacking. In addition, since European electrification standards generally predated double stacking and were not designed to accommodate for larger clearances than those permitted by existing bridges and tunnels, the overhead catenary in Europe is also too low to accommodate double stacking. Only a few newly built routes make accommodation for possible double stacking in the future such as the Betuweroute in the Netherlands which however links to no other railway line allowing double stacking.

Standard gauge railways in North America and China must use special well cars to lower the center of gravity, fit within the loading gauge and in China allow double-stack trains to run under specially heightened overhead lines. 1,676 mm (5 ft 6 in) broad gauge used in India enables trains to carry standard shipping containers double-stacked on standard flat wagons. Flat wagons, in addition to being much less expensive than well wagons, can carry more containers in a given length of train. Indian Railways is able to carry containers double-stacked on standard flat wagons at 100 km/h (62 mph). Experiments with triple-stacked operation using lower, 1,981 mm (6 ft 6 in) containers, were done unsuccessfully in 2006. Experiments in India for double stacking using flatcars under 25 kV AC overhead lines set 7.45 m (24 ft 5 1/4 in) above rail were carried out with funds given by Japan.. Double-stacked Freight services under electrified traction are operational on the Western Dedicated Freight Corridor

- Australia – double-stacked trains operate between Perth, Adelaide, Darwin and Parkes, New South Wales 6.5 m (21 ft 3 7/8 in) clearances. As of 2021, the Inland Railway between Melbourne and Brisbane was being built for operation of double stacked trains.
- Brazil – Double-stacked trains in Brazil operate between the intermodal terminal of Sumaré-SP and Rondonópolis-MT (around 1000 km). The operation started in June 2019 by Brado Logística. Besides that, a brand-new railroad called "Ferrovia Norte – Sul" will also operate with double-stack container trains. The operation will start in 2021.
- China – A number of select Class I trunk railway lines in China were constructed or upgraded with 25 kV AC overhead lines high enough to operate double-stacked container trains but currently do not see any double-stack service, such as the Nanjing–Qidong railway, Nantong–Shanghai railway, Guangzhou–Zhuhai railway and sections of the Beijing–Kowloon railway and Longhai railway. Since 2018, China Railway started operating double-stacked standard containers in well-wagons hauled by electric locomotives under overhead lines from Port of Ningbo-Zhoushan along the Xiaoshan–Ningbo railway and Chuanshan Port branch line to Shaoxing. Another railway in the area capable of operating double stack containers under overhead lines, the Ningbo–Jinhua railway connecting Port of Ningbo-Zhoushan to Yiwu and Jinhua, is under construction. Other under construction railways capable of operating double stack containers under overhead lines are the Liuzhou-Guangzhou Railway between Guangdong and Guangxi, Lanzhou-Chongqing Railway and a line from Guiyang via Nanning to the port city of Qinzhou. China's National Transportation Outline envisions a network of electric double stack container services connecting all major cities and ports.
- India – Mundra Port and Pipavav Port operate double-stacked diesel and electric trains on 1,676 mm (5 ft 6 in) gauge using flat wagons. It is one of only three countries to commercially double stack 9 ft 6 in (2,896 mm) tall (high cube) containers on a train. India is building the Dedicated Freight Corridor, an electric traction freight railway network which can transport double-stack international standard containers. The tracks are entirely grade-separated and have a generous loading gauge of 3,660 mm (12 ft 1/8 in) width and 7,100 mm (23 ft 3 1/2 in) maximum height allowing for the double-stacked shipping container on flatcars to be transported, in contrast to well cars used in other countries for double-stack rail transport. This allows for single trains to have a 400-container capacity.
- Kenya – The Mombasa-Nairobi standard gauge railway has been built for the operation of double-stacked trains, the first such trains being launched on October 1, 2018. All future extensions will be built to similar standards.
- Netherlands – The Betuweroute, a freight rail line between Rotterdam and the German border built in 2007 is prepared for double-stacking insofar as tunnels and bridges have been built to accommodate double-stack trains to reduce the cost and time of any future upgrade to the network. The current catenary wire is too low for double-stack rail transport (meaning the catenary would have to be raised to allow double stacking) and the upgrade is dependent on the German section of the railway connection as there are no accommodations for future double-stack transport on any line connecting to the Betuweroute on the German side.
- Panama – The rebuilt Panama Canal Railway operates double-stack container trains 76.6 kilometres (47.6 mi) across the Isthmus of Panama from Colón on the Atlantic Ocean to Balboa on the Pacific, near Panama City.
- Saudi Arabia – Saudi Railways Organization line to Dammam.

== See also ==
- Trailer-on-flatcar
- Bilevel rail car
