= William Walter Hay =

American civil engineer (1908–1998)

- Born: 10 December 1908; Bay City, Michigan, U.S.
- Died: 26 March 1998 (aged 89); Champaign, Illinois, U.S.
- Education: Carnegie Mellon University; University of Illinois Urbana-Champaign
- Scientific career
- Fields: Railway engineering
- Workplaces: Pennsylvania Railroad; Long Island Rail Road; Pittsburgh and Lake Erie Railroad; Military Railway Service (United States); Reading Railroad; University of Illinois Urbana-Champaign

William Walter Hay (1908–1998) was an American civil engineer and professor remembered with the annual American Railway Engineering and Maintenance-of-Way Association (AREMA) Hay Award recognizing outstanding achievements in railway engineering.

== Early years ==
William W. Hay was born in Bay City, Michigan, and completed a Bachelor of Science degree in management engineering at Carnegie Mellon University in 1931. After working briefly for the Pennsylvania Railroad, he undertook advanced coursework in railway operations at Yale University before returning to the Pennsylvania Railroad and later the Long Island Rail Road and Pittsburgh and Lake Erie Railroad. He rose to the rank of Lieutenant colonel with the United States Army Military Railway Service in both the European and Pacific theaters during World War II.

== University of Illinois ==
After working briefly for the Reading Railroad after the war, he joined the University of Illinois Urbana-Champaign faculty in 1947 and completed a Master of Science in Civil engineering in 1948. His Railroad Engineering textbook was published by John Wiley & Son in 1953. He was the Professor of Railway Civil Engineering from completion of his Doctor of Philosophy degree in 1956 until he retired in 1977. He continued teaching as an emeritus professor until 1989.

== AREMA Hay Award ==
Following Dr. Hay's death in 1998, the AREMA board of directors and committee on engineering economics established the annual William W. Hay Award to recognize these outstanding achievements in Railway Engineering:

- 1999: BNSF Railway – Thayer Blitz Project
- 2000: Amtrak – Northeast Corridor Improvement Project
- 2001: CSX Transportation – Baltimore and Ohio Railroad Capacity Improvement Project
- 2002: Alameda Corridor Transportation Authority – Alameda Corridor Project
- 2003: Port Authority of New York and New Jersey and AirRail Transit Consortium – AirTrain JFK
- 2004: Port Authority of New York and New Jersey – Restoration of PATH Commuter Rail Service to Lower Manhattan and Exchange Place, Jersey City
- 2005: TranSystems Corporation – Renaissance of the Kansas City Junction
- 2006: CSX Transportation and Norfolk Southern Railway – Hurricane Katrina Recovery Efforts
- 2007: Norfolk Southern Railway – Keystone Buildout Project
- 2008: Union Pacific Railroad – Grant Tower Realignment Project
- 2009: Union Pacific Railroad – Frazier Landslide Clean-up and Construction Project on the Cascade Subdivision in Oregon
- 2010: Norfolk Southern Railway – Heartland Corridor Clearance Improvement Project
- 2011: CSX Intermodal Terminals, Inc. – Northwest Ohio Intermodal freight transport Terminal Project
- 2012: BNSF Railway – Overcoming the 2011 Floods
- 2013: Utah Transit Authority – FrontRunner South Commuter Rail Line
- 2014: Union Pacific Railroad – Santa Teresa, New Mexico, Terminal
- 2015: Union Pacific Railroad and BNSF Railway – Tower 55 Multimodal Improvement Project
- 2016: TranSystems Corporation – Englewood, Chicago, P-1 Flyover Project
- 2017: Washington State Department of Transportation and BNSF Railway – Improvements for Passenger Rail Service and Reliability
- 2018: Arup – Fulton Center in New York City
- 2019: KiwiRail – Main North Line Earthquake Recovery Project in New Zealand
- 2020: Hanson Professional Services Inc. - Norfolk Southern’s Grand River Bridge Emergency Repairs in Brunswick, Missouri
- 2021: Canadian National Railway - Construction of the New McComb Bonnet Carré Spillway Bridge
