= Virginia Port Authority =

Autonomous agency of the Commonwealth of Virginia

The Virginia Port Authority (VPA) is an autonomous agency (political subdivision) of the Commonwealth of Virginia that owns The Port of Virginia, a group of facilities with their activity centered on the harbor of Hampton Roads, Virginia.

The principal facilities of the Port of Virginia are four marine terminals, all on the harbor of Hampton Roads:

- Norfolk International Terminals (NIT) at Norfolk, Virginia
- Portsmouth Marine Terminal (PMT) at Portsmouth, Virginia
- Newport News Marine Terminal (NNMT) at Newport News, Virginia
- Virginia International Gateway (VIG) at Portsmouth, Virginia

one intermodal container transfer facility (dry port):

- Virginia Inland Port (VIP) at Front Royal, Virginia

and one inland marine terminal, which it operates via a lease:

- Port of Richmond, in Richmond, Virginia

A site on the harbor at nearby Craney Island has been identified for future expansion.

Virginia International Terminals, Inc. (VIT), the Virginia Port Authority's non-stock, non-profit affiliate, has operated the Port of Virginia since its creation by the state in 1981 and is headquartered in downtown Norfolk, Virginia. The agency also employs regional managers throughout the United States and in Belgium, Brazil, Japan, Hong Kong, India, and South Korea.

== Governance ==
As an agency of the Commonwealth, the Virginia Port Authority reports to the Virginia Secretary of Transportation. The Governor of Virginia appoints 11 citizens to form the Virginia Port Authority Board of Commissioners, and the state treasurer is an ex officio member of the Board. Commissioners serve staggered five year terms at the pleasure of the Governor, and no commissioner may serve more than two consecutive terms. Law dictates that there must be one, but no more than one, commissioner from Norfolk or Virginia Beach; one, but no more than one, commissioner from Portsmouth or Chesapeake; and one, but no more than one, commissioner from Hampton or Newport News. Traditionally, an active or retired senior executive from Norfolk Southern Railway and an individual with ties to the coal industry have also served as members of the Board. The Board elects a chairman and vice chairman from within its membership.

The Board of Commissioners appoints the executive director of the Virginia Port Authority, who is responsible for overseeing the daily execution of the agency's policies, and serving as an ex officio member of VIT's Board of Directors.

== Economic status ==
The Virginia Port Authority is exempt from state and federal taxes, but as a result receives no money from the state's General Fund. Port operations are paid for using revenue generated by port activities, predominantly trade. The Port Authority does, however, receive state transportation money for capital projects, for such things as new wharfs and cranes. The agency receives 4.2 percent of the Commonwealth Transportation Trust Fund, a fund that's generated by fuel taxes, vehicle sales and use taxes, and some sales taxes. Such revenue is invested in maintaining and improving the facilities and in marketing the port to potential clients.

== History ==
The Virginia Port Authority had its roots in the Virginia State Ports Authority, an agency of the Commonwealth created in 1952 that was responsible for operating the port terminals in the Hampton Roads harbor. Studies commissioned by the Virginia General Assembly during the 1970s and the early 1980s suggested that the port terminals should be consolidated under a single port authority that would manage the activities of the terminals while remaining under the authority of the General Assembly. Legislation changed the name of the Virginia State Ports Authority to the Virginia Port Authority to reflect the goal of integrating the ports. Virginia Senate Bill 548 mandated that the Virginia Port Authority complete the unification as swiftly as possible. In addition, the General Assembly revised the VPA's enabling legislation to allow the agency to subordinate local port cities, towns, and other entities; to acquire federal, state, and local property; and to provide for a tariff.

The VPA purchased the terminals piecemeal. Portsmouth Marine Terminal became the first port to enter the unification program; the City of Portsmouth conveyed the port to the VPA in 1971. Later that same year, Newport News Marine Terminal (NNMT) was transferred to the VPA with the consent of its owner Peninsula Ports Authority (PPAV), its operator Chesapeake and Ohio Railway, and the cities of Hampton and Newport News. The VPA acquired Norfolk International Terminals from the City of Norfolk in 1972.

In order to manage the consolidated marine terminal operations, Virginia International Terminals, Inc. was created in 1982. VIT not only systematized operations at the VPA's facilities, but also moved cargo more efficiently and strengthened the port's marketing program.

Two pieces of legislation in the 1980s aided the development of The Port of Virginia. The first, the Transportation Trust Fund, became the source for the Commonwealth Port Fund. The Commonwealth Port Fund was created by the General Assembly from a portion of the revenue generated by transportation taxes and fees, and was transferred to the Board of Commissioners of the VPA to satisfy port capital needs within Virginia.

The second piece of legislation was the Water Resources Act of 1986, a federal cost-sharing initiative that provided for the dredging of all major U.S. river channels and waterways. The Hampton Roads harbor became the first to begin dredging under the new legislation, with the aim of deepening the outbound navigational channel from 45 to 50 feet (15 m). The project was completed in 1988 with the help of the U.S. Army Corps of Engineers.

In 1989, the VPA opened the Virginia Inland Port, a $10 million intermodal facility in Front Royal, Virginia. The combination truck-and-rail terminal sits near the intersection of U.S. Interstate 81 and U.S. Interstate 66 and extends the VPA's activities to Maryland, Delaware, West Virginia, Ohio, Pennsylvania, and New York.

== Facilities ==
=== Norfolk International Terminals ===
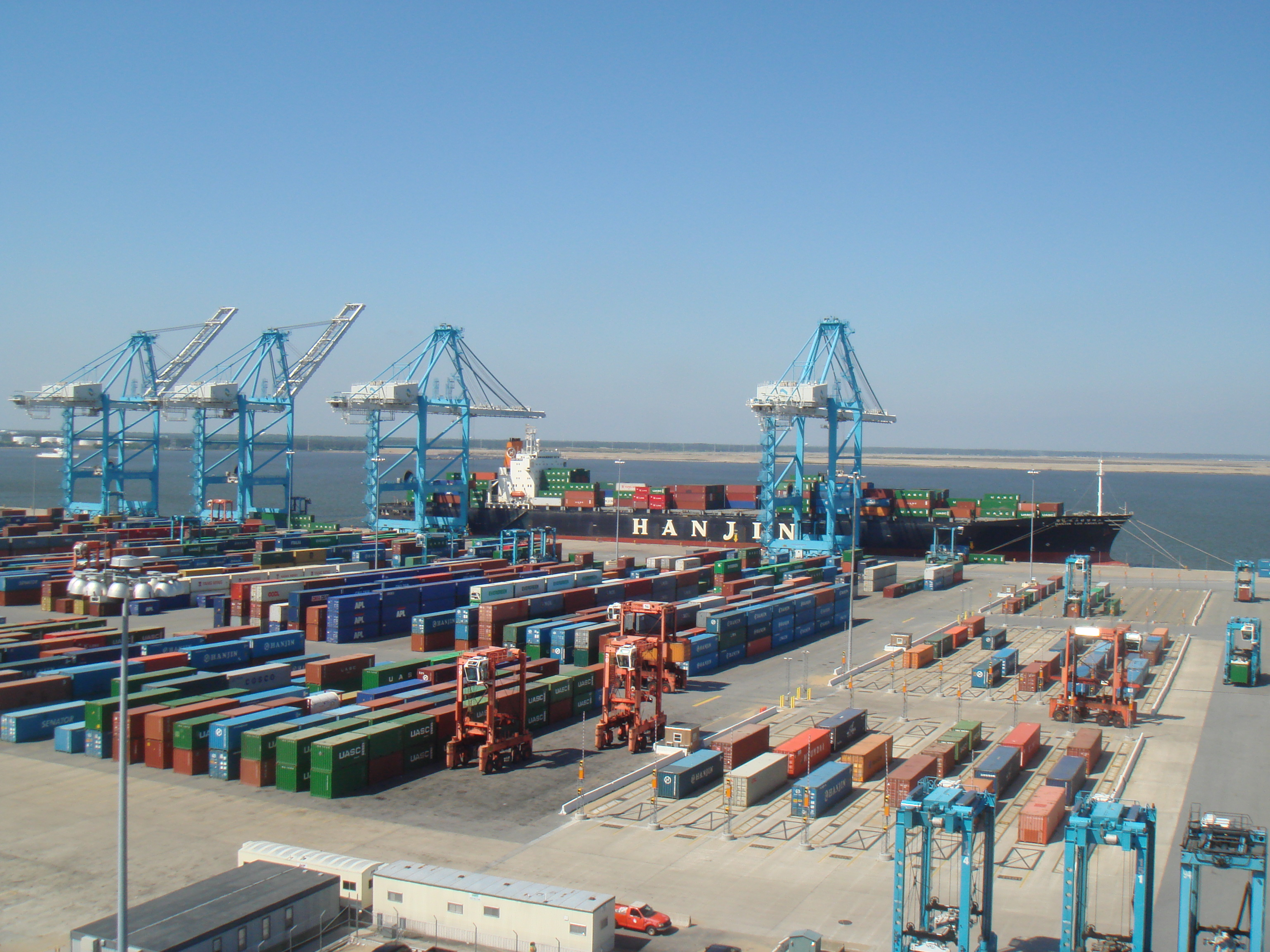
Norfolk International Terminal

Norfolk International Terminals is the largest of the four facilities, with a land area of 648 acres (2.62 km^{2}). The terminal has fifty-foot-deep entrance channels at the north and south ends. The terminal is serviced by 89,300 feet (27,200 m) of rail track and 11 Suez-class container cranes. A marginal wharf measuring 5,730 feet (1,750 m) long provides five berths for vessels carrying containerized, breakbulk, and roll-on/roll-off cargoes. NIT provides 34,219 TEUs of container storage space; 2,340,000 square feet (217,000 m^{2}) total of covered pier, dry, and cold storage space; and space for 702 stacked truck chassis. NIT is accessible via Interstates 64, Interstate 564, and Terminal Boulevard, and via rail serviced by Norfolk Southern Railway, CSX Corporation, and the Norfolk Division of the Buckingham Branch Railroad.

NIT was originally a surplus Army base that the City of Norfolk purchased in 1965. The city outfitted the base with a container crane and put a one-berth container facility in service in addition to the breakbulk capacity already available. A second container berth and two more container cranes were added in the early 1970s.

The Virginia Port Authority used a $12 million appropriation from the General Assembly to acquire NIT on July 1, 1972. Slightly more than half the money went to pay obligations to the city and terminal; the remainder was dedicated to purchasing a fourth container crane, extending the container berth, and improving support structures.

During the 1980s, NIT attracted the business of Nissan Motor Company and Evergreen. To meet increasing demand, the VPA dredged deeper channels, added a fourth berth, built a 32,000-square-foot (3,000 m^{2}) warehouse, purchased three high-speed gantry cranes, and paved another container storage area.

Throughout the 1990s and 2000s, the VPA continued to expand the facilities, replace old cranes, and add new ones, until it reached its present capacity. On July 16, 2008, the three newest, and largest, cranes were delivered to the terminal.

=== Portsmouth Marine Terminal ===
Virginia Port Authority facility locations
1 Norfolk International Terminals
2 Portsmouth Marine Terminal
3 Newport News Marine Terminal
4 Virginia International Gateway
5 Virginia Inland Port (shown in insert)

Portsmouth Marine Terminal is the second largest of the four facilities, with a land area of 219 acres (0.89 km^{2}). The terminal has a forty-five-foot-deep main channel. The terminal is serviced by 20,100 feet (6,100 m) of rail track, six container cranes, and one gantry crane. A marginal wharf measuring 3,540 feet (1,080 m) long provides three berths for vessels carrying containerized, breakbulk, and roll-on/roll-off cargoes. PMT provides 33,786 TEUs of container storage space; 94,471 square feet (8,776.6 m^{2}) of dry storage space; and space for 260 reefer receptacles. PMT is accessible via U.S. Route 58, which is connected to Interstates 95, 64, and 664; and via rail serviced by Norfolk Southern Railway and CSX Transportation.

Most of PMT was built upon reclaimed land containing dredged material from the construction of the Midtown Tunnel. The terminal began, in part, as a port owned by a railroad that served Pinner's Point. The Virginia State Ports Authority purchased the facility, but in 1965 leased a portion of it to the City of Portsmouth. Funds from the General Assembly and the city paid for a temporary pier.

By 1971, PMT had developed into a conventional two-berth general cargo marine terminal. In that year, the VPA bought Portsmouth's interest in the facility for approximately $7,418,000.

In 1975, an agreement between the VPA and Portsmouth allowed Sea-Land Service, Inc. to construct a terminal on the property of PMT; the new facility used about one-third of the available space. Sea-Land built a 600-foot (180 m) marginal wharf, a paved backup storage area, an office building, a warehouse with 26 loading bays, and a maintenance garage. Sea-Land also purchased a container crane. Sea-Land developed the terminal under a 30-year lease that stipulated that at the end of the lease the land and facility would revert to the VPA.

During the early 1990s PMT received another high-speed container crane and a dock extension that joined the existing 600-foot (180 m) marginal wharf at the Sea-Land facility with the marginal wharf at the VPA's facility.

=== Newport News Marine Terminal ===
Newport News Marine Terminal is the smallest of the four facilities, with a land area of 140.64 acres (0.5691 km^{2}). The terminal has a forty-five-foot-deep main channel. The terminal is serviced by 42,720 feet (13,020 m) of rail track and four container cranes. Two berths handle cruise vessels and breakbulk cargo. The facility is also capable of handling containerized and roll-on/roll-off cargo. NNMT provides storage space for 790 containers and 1,210 chassis. NNMT also offers 394,000 square feet (36,600 m^{2}) of covered storage space; 256,000 square feet (23,800 m^{2}) of dry storage space; and 43 acres (170,000 m^{2}) of open yard storage space. NNMT is accessible via Interstate 64, Interstate 664, and U.S. Route 17. Breakbulk rail service is provided by CSX Corporation. Containerized cargo is drayed to and from NIT when Norfolk Southern rail service is necessary.

Prior to the beginning of port unification in 1971, the Peninsula Ports Authority of Virginia (PPAV) owned the terminal and Chesapeake and Ohio Railway (now CSX) operated it. In the late 1960s, Pier B entered service and construction of Pier C began. When, in 1971, the PPAV and Chesapeake and Ohio Railway conveyed their rights to NNMT to the VPA, Pier C had not yet been completed. One of the requirements of the contract stipulated that the VPA had to obtain state funding to finish the project. In 1972, the General Assembly appropriated the necessary funds.

Chesapeake and Ohio Railway remained the operator of NNMT until 1982, when the VPA Board of Commissioners authorized VIT to take over the operations. In 1983, the VPA purchased 22 acres (89,000 m^{2}) of land adjacent to NNMT from CSX, then leased the land back to the railway company for two years while it built a repair along its tracks.

In the 1990s, NNMT received a $10 million entrance complex, an interchange, scales, an administration building, 27 acres (110,000 m^{2}) of paved cargo space, and an extension to Pier C. In 1994, the Nissan Import Auto Operations facility, previously located at NIT, was relocated to a newly developed 25-acre (100,000 m^{2}) space at NNMT.

=== Virginia International Gateway (VIG) ===
In 2010, the VPA entered into a 20-year lease agreement with Netherlands-based APM Terminals, a global port, terminal and Inland Services operator which is an independent business unit of Danish A.P. Moller-Maersk Group that effectively gives the agency control over all operations at VIG. Highly automated, the $450 million terminal in Portsmouth located on a 291-acre (1.18 km^{2}) site was the largest investment in a company-owned container terminal in the nation when opened by APM Terminals in 2007. The addition of APM Terminals Virginia terminal meant that all the marine cargo container terminals in the Hampton Roads harbor became united under the VPA's management as of July, 2010.

In August 2014, the sale of APM Terminals Virginia, in Portsmouth, was finalized. The 576-acre, highly automated container terminal was purchased by Alinda Capital Partners, a U.S. infrastructure investment firm, and Universities Superannuation Scheme Ltd., a pension fund based in the United Kingdom. Alinda and the VPA signed a 49-year lease in 2016, under which the VPA operates the terminal.

=== Virginia Inland Port ===
The Virginia Inland Port, located in Front Royal, Virginia, is the second smallest of the four facilities, with a land area of 161 acres (0.65 km^{2}). The terminal is serviced by 17,820 feet (5,430 m) of rail track that runs adjacent to Norfolk Southern Railway's main rail line. VIP is accessible via Interstates 66 and 81.

The $10 million intermodal facility opened in 1989, extending The Port of Virginia's operations 220 miles (350 km) inland. VIP provides access to markets in Washington, D.C., Maryland, Delaware, West Virginia, Ohio, Pennsylvania, and New York. The terminal offers a three-door cross dock facility for transferring cargo, a maintenance building, a chassis pool, reefer gensets, and shore power. As a U.S. Customs-designated port of entry, VIP supplies a full range of customs functions. USDA and SGS inspections are also available as needed.

=== Port of Richmond ===
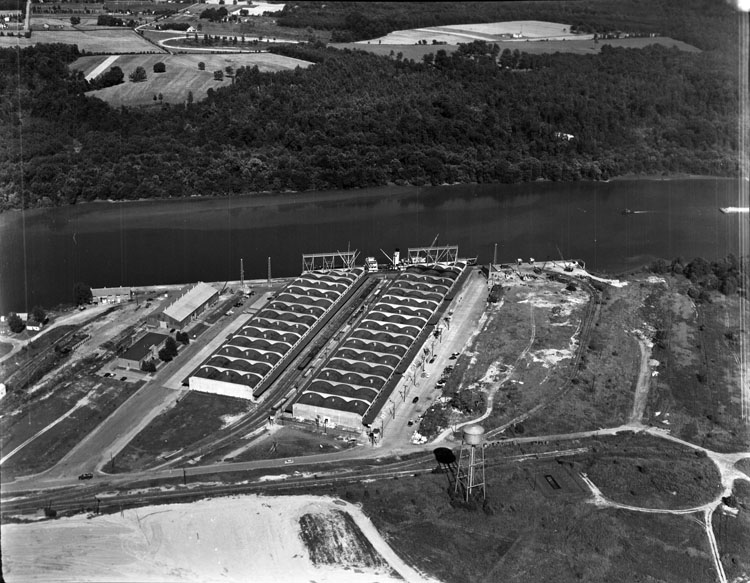
Aerial photo of the Port of Richmond, ca. 1957 (looking east)

The Port of Richmond, also known as the Richmond Deepwater Terminal and the Richmond Marine Terminal, is located on the James River in Richmond, Virginia, United States, 100 miles (160 km) inland from Cape Henry and approximately 78 miles (126 km) northwest of Newport News, Virginia. It is located at 77° 25' west longitude and 37° 27' north latitude, lies adjacent to Interstate 95, and is 4 miles (6 km) south of downtown Richmond. Richmond is the western terminus for commercial navigation on the James River, due to the Fall Line.

== Future ==
VPA appears to be making preparations to take advantage of the future traffic potential of marine cargo container traffic in an ever-increasingly global market. The capacity expansion at Norfolk International Terminal, the 20-year lease of the APTM Virginia terminal facilities at Portsmouth and the planning and initial stages of the Craney Island terminal project all are complementary to what others are doing and how various investments are being made in transportation infrastructure improvements. Other entities doing so include the U.S. federal government, other Virginia agencies, other states and their respective local agencies (i.e. Toledo), corporate entities (notably the two Class 1 railroads and several short line railroads operating in the Hampton Roads region. VPA is even apparently ready to capitalize on developments initiated in other countries, with a particular emphasis on Panama's canal widening project.

=== Double stack intermodal with railroads ===
East coast ports from Wilmington, North Carolina north to New York City, notably including facilities at Norfolk, Portsmouth and Newport News on the harbor of Hampton Roads, currently receive extensive intermodal shipping container traffic. Much of the volume is from China and other points in Asia and is bound for the eastern 1/3 of the United States. Most containers are then transferred to railroads, and then transported generally as close as possible to final destinations, where they are then moved onto trucks for the final portion of their journeys.

As this volume has increased in recent years, it has become increasingly clear that there was a need for improved intermodal transfer facilities, both at the ports, and near the final destinations. Additionally, the two major Class 1 railroads serving this growing traffic, Norfolk Southern Corporation (NS) and CSX Transportation (CSX), have each been forced utilize circuitous routing to avoid conflicts with tunnel and bridge clearances when crossing the Blue Ridge Mountains and the Allegheny Mountains. Using a combination of governmental funds from federal and state funding from Virginia, West Virginia and Ohio and with substantial investment of their own corporate resources, both railroads have been engaged in addressing both issues, NS has been working on its Heartland Corridor project by raising vertical clearances in 28 tunnels on an extant Norfolk Southern rail line between the port of Hampton Roads Chicago. CSX has a similar goal with National Gateway Project which is also upgrading bridges and tunnels. Both railroads are also expanding intermodal terminal capacities in Ohio. In June, 2010, NS announced that it had reached an agreement with Ohio to extend a leg of the Heartland Corridor southwesterly from Columbus to Cincinnati, which is located on the Ohio River near the border where Ohio, Kentucky and Indiana converge. The $6.1 million cost will be funded with federal economic stimulus funds and the Ohio-Kentucky-Indiana Regional Council of Governments, plus money from NS.

=== Commonwealth Railway relocation ===
To serve more volume with greater safety, Virginia recently entered the final completion stages of relocating the eastern portion of a short line railroad operated through Portsmouth by the Commonwealth Railway to the center median of Virginia State Route 164 and Interstate 664. The line extends from VPA facilities in Portsmouth to Suffolk, a location which, due largely to geography of the region, has long been a rail and highway hub in the western portion of South Hampton Roads. The move eliminated the prior routing of intermodal traffic along the Commonwealth Railway through neighborhoods in Portsmouth as well as reduced the hazards of grade crossings with streets and highways.

=== 2014: Panama Canal traffic ===
In 2014, the Panama Canal expansion project is due to be completed. A 15-year-long project, it will double the canal's capacity and allow it to carry the bigger container vessels and bulk ships which have become favored by the shipping lines since the canal first opened in 1914. Such larger craft currently cannot use the port. Instead, much of the shipping container traffic currently uses West Coast ports such as Los Angeles and Long Beach, California. The containers then travel overland via either railroad or by trucking. By coming through the widened Panama Canal to the Gulf of Mexico and sailing on to East Coast ports, these vessels will be able to reduce shipping time and expense to reach major U.S. markets along the Mississippi River basin and the points east of there. Much of such rail traffic now changes at "gateway" railhead cities such as Chicago and St. Louis, from western class 1 railroads such as Union Pacific and Burlington Northern Santa Fe Railway (BNSF) to other railroads.

By using the canal and east coast ports, potentially a lot of shipping expense for the rail portion to destinations can be saved. However, keys to shipping via the western versus eastern ports are facilities at the ports, better rail links inland, shipping times, and costs.

VPA's recent lease of the massive APTM intermodal terminal at Portsmouth and its capacity expansion at the Norfolk International Terminal both help Virginia to be positioned favorably, as do the move of the local railroad line, and the planning for even more capacity at Craney Island.

Currently, according to Trains magazine, Hampton Roads and Baltimore are the only ones on the U.S. East Coast which can already handle the greater draft (channel depth) of 50–55 feet and height clearance (approximately 50 feet) which are needed for the larger ships that would begin coming through the widened canal. In the Spring of 2010, Norfolk Southern had almost completed the Heartland Corridor project and work on CSX's National Gateway was well underway. Officials in Ohio had already celebrated groundbreaking for the intermodal yard expansions by both railroads.

== Virginia Port Authority Police Department ==
The Virginia Port Authority maintains its own police force of fully state certified and sworn law enforcement officers of the Commonwealth of Virginia. Police officers are responsible for physical security and law enforcement at the marine terminals and the intermodal facility. The law enforcement officers also have concurrent jurisdiction around the different ports.

== See also ==
- Port authority
- United States container ports
