= Commonwealth Railway =

Class III railway in Virginia, USA

Commonwealth Railway, Inc.

Overview
- Headquarters: Suffolk, VA
- Reporting mark: CWRY
- Locale: Suffolk, VA to Portsmouth, VA
- Dates of operation: August 1989–present

Technical
- Track gauge: 4 ft 8 1/2 in (1,435 mm) standard gauge
- Length: 19 mi (31 km)

Other
- Website: https://www.gwrr.com/cwry/

The Commonwealth Railway, Inc. (reporting mark CWRY) is a United States Class III short-line railroad operating 19 miles (31 km) of track of a former Norfolk, Franklin and Danville Railway line from Suffolk, Virginia, to Portsmouth, Virginia. The main office is in the Wilroy area of Suffolk. Commonwealth Railway was acquired by Genesee & Wyoming Inc. in 1996 (who still owns it today) and is a part of Norfolk Southern's "Thoroughbred Shortline Program". It interchanges with Norfolk Southern and CSX in Norfolk, Virginia.

== History ==
An important industry on the line was the BASF Chemical plant in the West Norfolk area of Portsmouth. The plant was usually switched by locomotive #444, a GP16 class locomotive rebuilt by Seaboard Coast Line Railroad in the early 1980s. The main locomotive was #517, a CF7 rebuild of an EMD F7 performed by the Atchison, Topeka and Santa Fe Railway in the 1970s.

The BASF plant closed in 2007 and was subsequently demolished. A small chemical company remains on the site.

Another important industry is APM Terminals, which is a modern shipping container port in Portsmouth along the Elizabeth River. This port was leased by Maersk to the Virginia Port Authority in late 2010. Commonwealth Railway is the only rail line to access the port. Another port is planned for Craney Island; however, as of 2020 the port is still in the planning stage and has not been constructed.

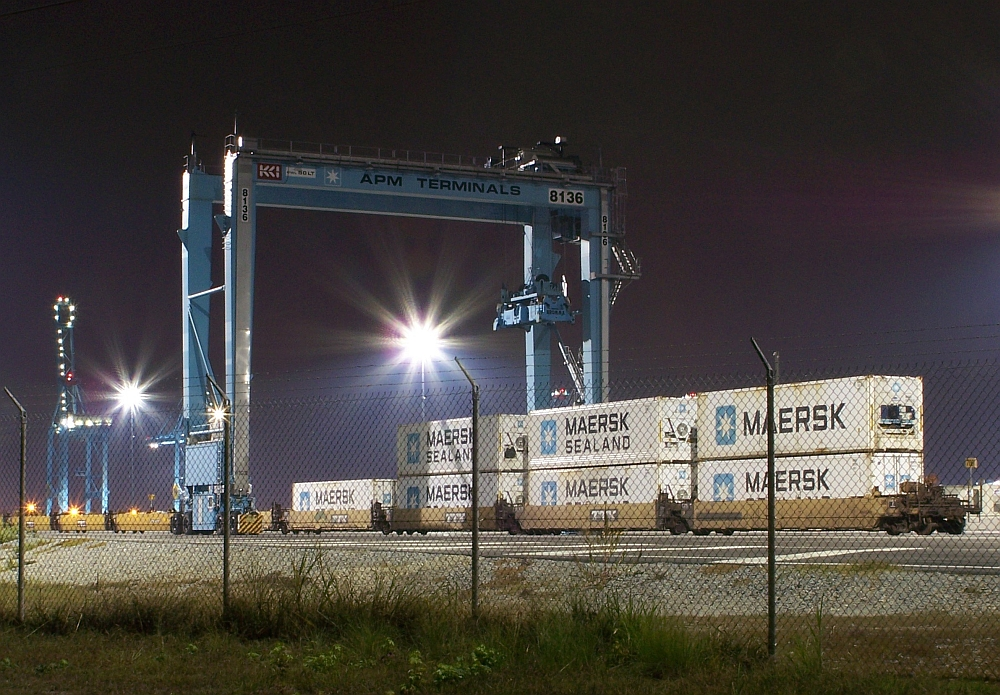
Maersk's APM Terminals in Portsmouth, Virginia, at night

With the opening of this new container port, two EMD SW1500 switch engines were added to the roster. To handle the container traffic to and from the port, the Commonwealth Railway line through the city of Portsmouth has been realigned down the medians of I-664 and SR 164, at a cost of $60 million. A small marshaling yard was built in the Baileytown area of Suffolk. Double-stack container service started in December 2010. A second phase, paid for by $9 million in federal stimulus funding, will further improve port access and is expected to be completed in September 2011.

== Locomotives ==
The Commonwealth Railway had two GP20 locomotives numbered 2090 and 2091 which were sold in 2019 to Larry's Truck & Electric (LTEX) in McDonald, Ohio. By 2020 the Commonwealth Railway operated only one locomotive, an EMD GP15-1 numbered 1424, leased from LTEX. The company's remaining EMD SW1500, No. 1551, is leased to the International Paper Company in Franklin, Virginia.

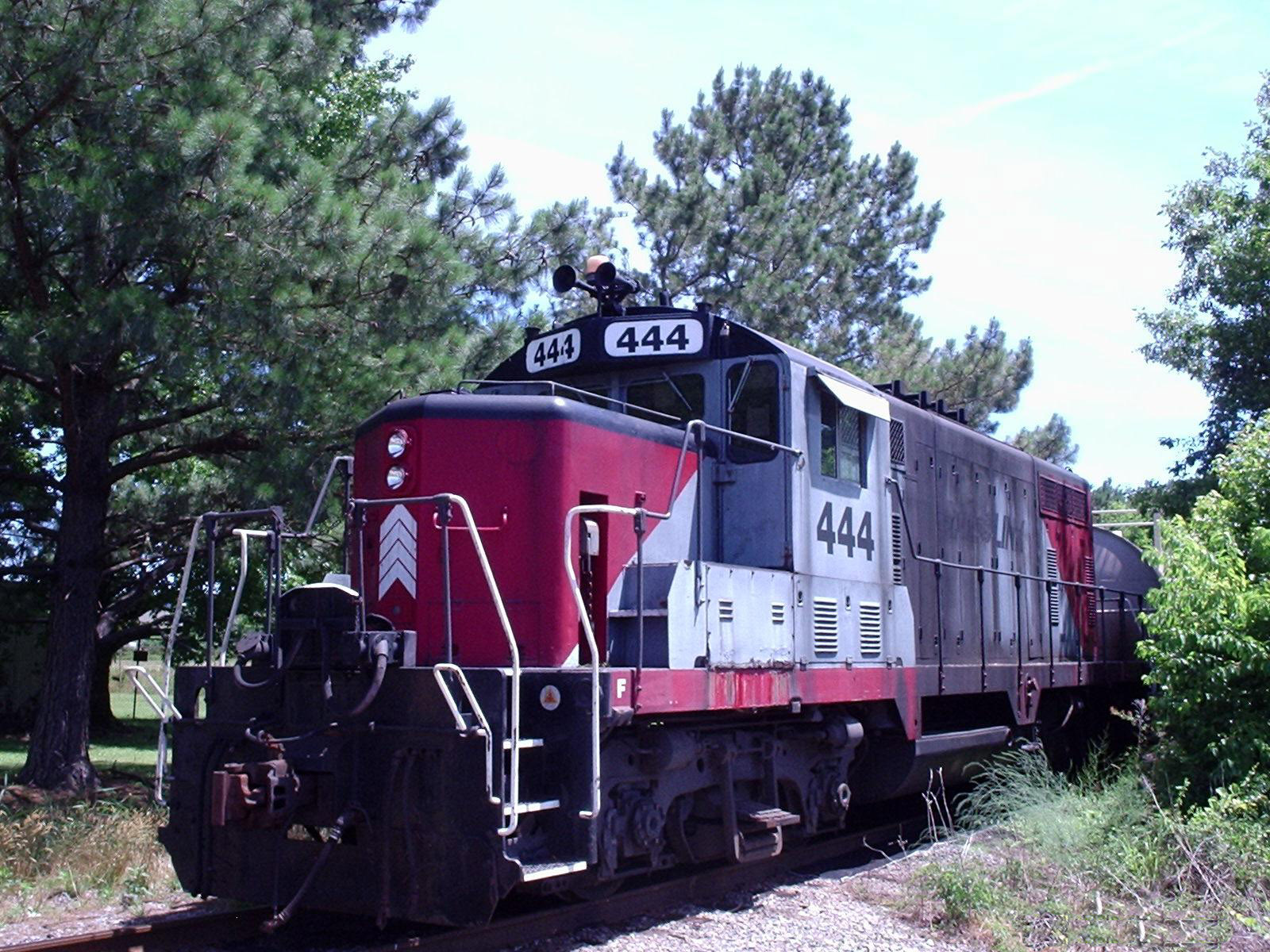
Rail Link Inc. #444, a GP16 rebuild, was used for switching along the Commonwealth Railway in Suffolk, Virginia. It has since been transferred to the First Coast Railroad, another G&W property, in Fernandina Beach, Florida.

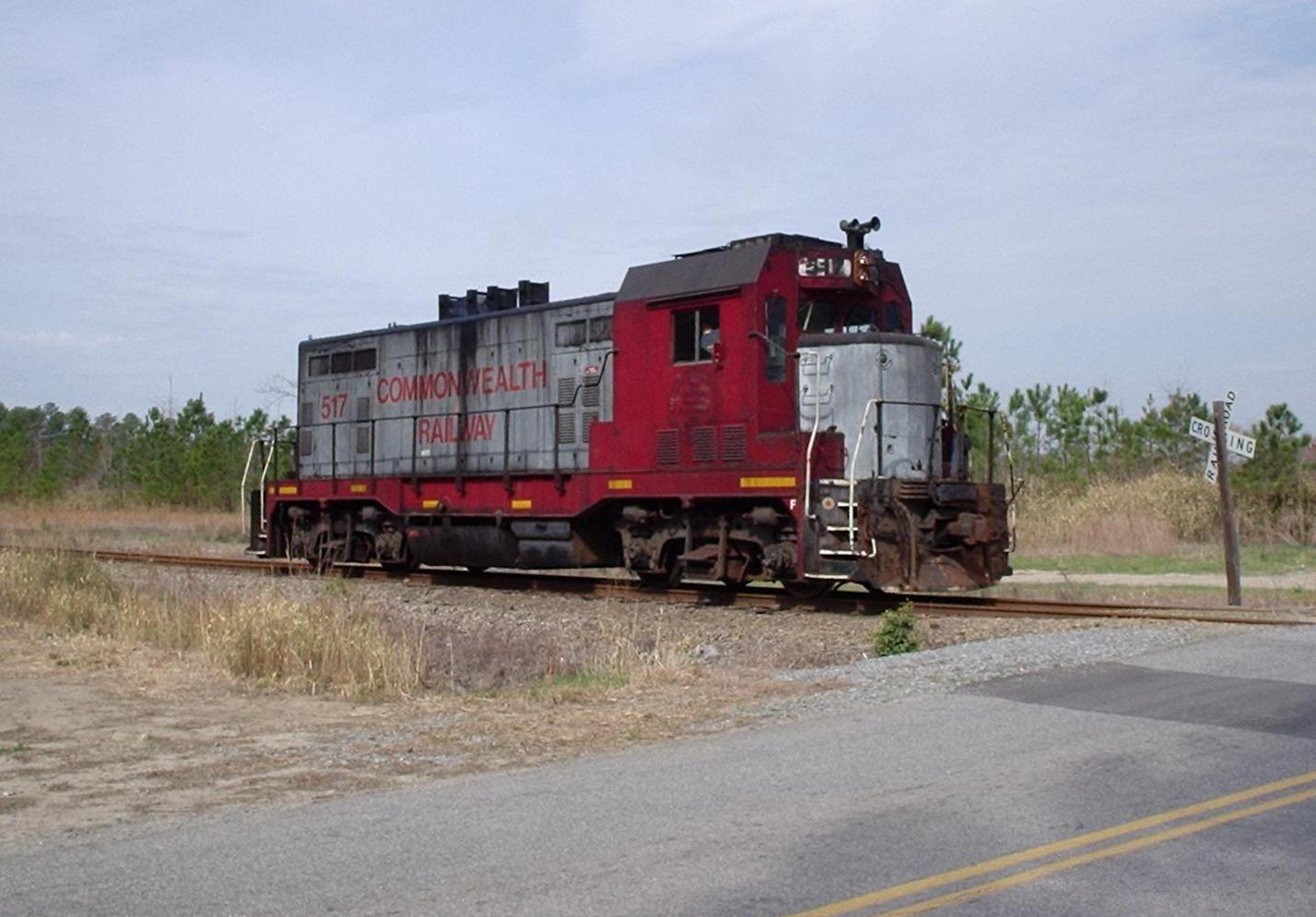
Locomotive #517 runs past the site of the new yard at Suffolk, Virginia after switching the BASF plant. Today it sits behind a warehouse in the Wilroy industrial park, out of service and awaiting a scrapper to cut it up.

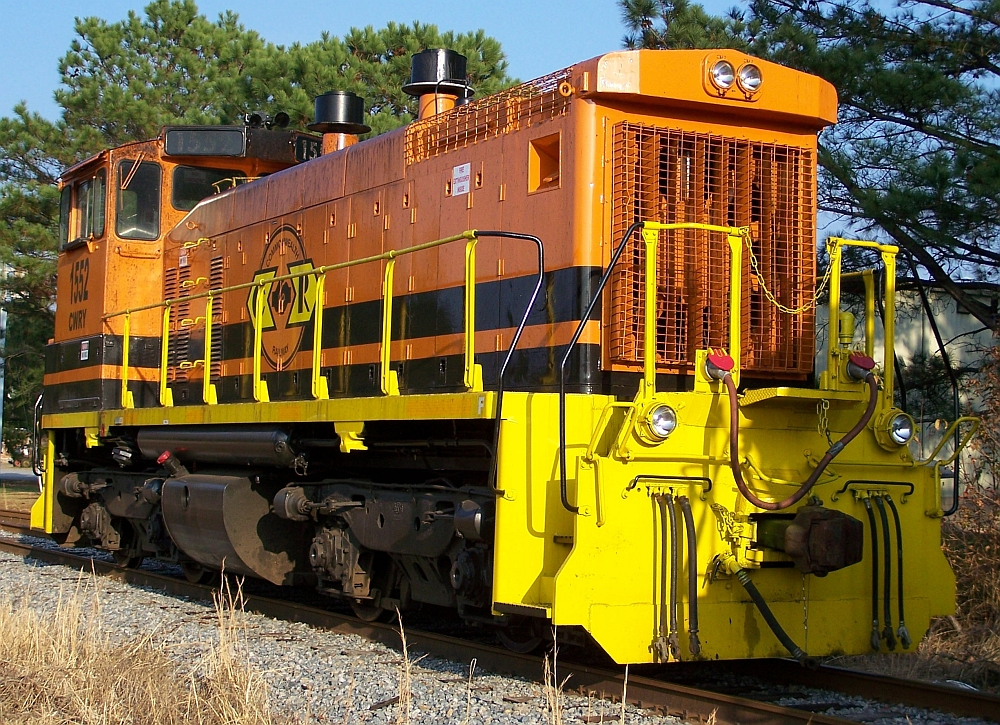
Commonwealth Railway #1552 an SW1500 parked at Wilroy in Suffolk, Virginia. It has been transferred to the G&W's Georgia Central Railway in Lyons, Georgia.
