= Crescent Corridor =

Railroad corridor in the eastern US

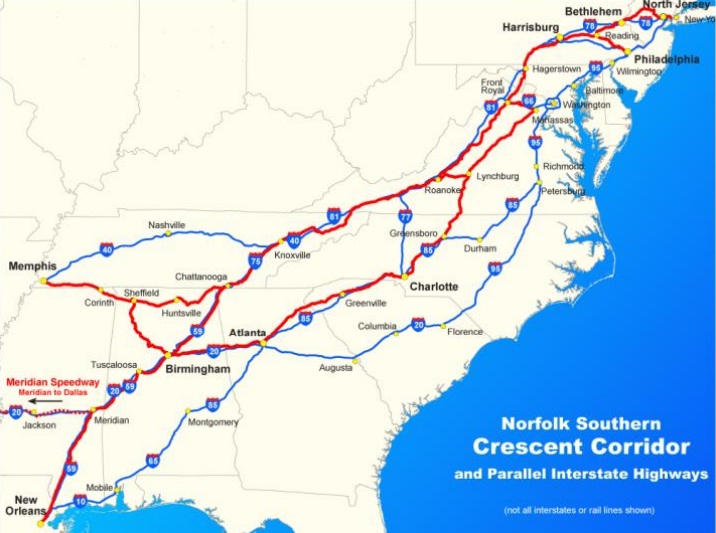
Crescent Corridor running parallel to interstates

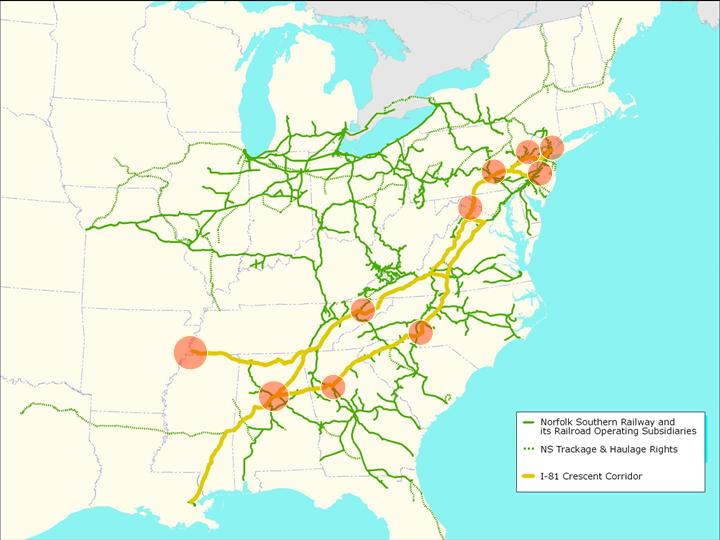
NS Crescent Corridor. Pink dots are current or future Intermodal terminal of focus for expansion.

The Crescent Corridor is a railroad corridor operated by the Norfolk Southern Railway (NS). The project, first proposed in 2007, and scheduled for completion by 2020, spans 13 states from New York to Louisiana. It is a private-public partnership between Norfolk Southern and the various state and federal governments.

== Project overview ==
Norfolk Southern plans that the project will expand its entire network from the Northeast to the Southeast regions. It is expected that the majority of cargo along the corridor would be intermodal. Norfolk Southern projects the removal of 1.3 million long-haul trucks annually from interstate highways, thereby reducing traffic congestion and helping the environment.

The corridor is 1,400 miles (2,300 km) long and 28 new trains daily would be expected to go into service along with improvements to rail yards along the corridor. NS has proposed sharing the costs with federal and state agencies in a public-private partnership. The overall project cost estimate is USD$2.5 billion as of 2009. NS plans to expand and upgrade existing rail lines along the corridor to accommodate fast freight trains and also purchase new locomotives and freight cars, and build new terminals.

== Intermodal facilities ==
Norfolk Southern opened new terminal facilities for Charlotte, North Carolina; Memphis, Tennessee; Birmingham, Alabama and Greencastle, Pennsylvania. It also upgraded terminals in Harrisburg and Bethlehem, Pennsylvania.

Norfolk Southern will expand Croxton Yard in New Jersey.

== Project status ==
Greencastle, Pennsylvania Intermodal terminal dedicated in June 2013.

Memphis Regional Intermodal Facility in Rossville, Tennessee opened in July 2012.

Birmingham Regional Intermodal Facility in McCalla, Alabama opened in October 2012.

Charlotte, North Carolina Intermodal terminal opened in December 2013.

== See also ==
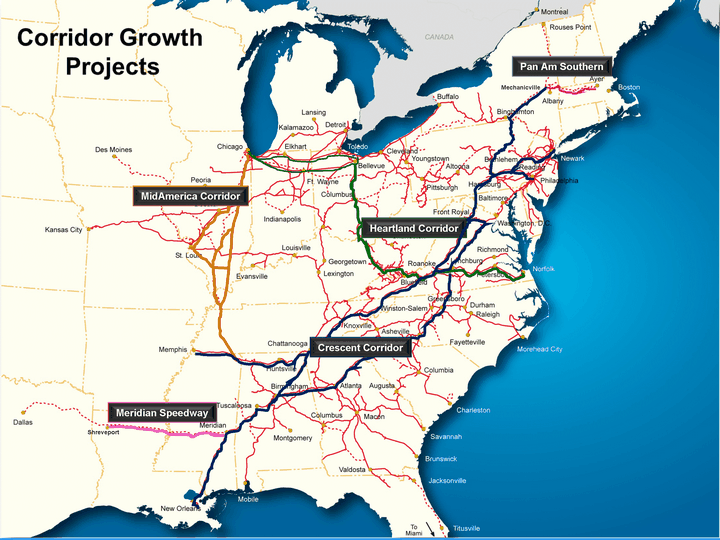
Norfolk Southern Corridor growth map

- Chicago Region Environmental and Transportation Efficiency Program (CREATE)
- Heartland Corridor – NS rail improvement program between Norfolk and Chicago
- National Gateway – CSX Transportation rail improvement program
