= National Gateway =

Railroad construction project in the US

National Gateway is a multi-stage railroad construction project in the United States promoted by CSX Transportation, a unit of CSX Corporation. It is designed to improve rail connections between ports in the U.S. mid-Atlantic seaboard and the Midwest by upgrading bridges and tunnels to allow taller freight trains (ones carrying double-stack intermodal containers). In 2008 the company announced its plans to invest $300 million, and is seeking investment from state governments and the U.S. federal government of an additional $400 million as a public-private partnership. Phase 1 of the $850 million project, between CSX's existing terminal in Chambersburg, Pennsylvania, and its hub facility in Northwest Ohio. was completed in September 2013.

== Unrelated project ==
An unrelated project with the same name was founded in 2001 as an engineering test between global communication networks.

== Completed railway improvement projects ==
- Northwest Ohio Intermodal Terminal in North Baltimore, Ohio. Funded completely by CSX. Opened February 2011. A number of tunnels were open cut for the project including:
  - Shoo Fly Tunnel (2012)
  - Pinkerton Tunnel (2012)
  - Benford Tunnel (2012)
- Virginia Avenue Tunnel in Washington, DC (2018). Tunnel rebuilt using cut-and-cover to double track and allow for double-stacked containers.

== Projects under construction or funded ==
- Rail corridor parallel to Interstate 70 and Interstate 76 between Washington, D.C. and northwest Ohio, via Pittsburgh. Federal funding approved in December 2010.
- Lowering track on the Capital Subdivision in Maryland.
- Replacing bridges and modifying tunnels on the Metropolitan Subdivision in Maryland.

== Proposed projects ==
- Rail corridor parallel to Interstate 95 between North Carolina and Baltimore, via Washington, D.C.
  - Lowering track and modifying the Long Bridge on the RF&P Subdivision in Washington
  - Replacing a bridge on the RF&P Subdivision in Woodbridge, Virginia
- Washington, D.C. - Ohio rail corridor
  - New intermodal terminal in western Pennsylvania.
  - New intermodal rail yard in Columbus, Ohio.
- Carolina Corridor between Wilmington and Charlotte

== See also ==
- National Docks Secondary and Long Dock Tunnel
- List of CSX Transportation lines
- Heartland Corridor – Norfolk Southern Railway improvement project
- Norfolk Southern Crescent Corridor
- Virginia Port Authority
- Transportation Investment Generating Economic Recovery, a stimulus program providing some of the funding
- MidAmerica Corridor
