= American Railway Engineering and Maintenance-of-Way Association =

North American railway industry group

- Founded: 1997
- Purpose: Railway engineering in North America
- Headquarters: Alexandria, Virginia
- Region served: North America
- Key people: David Clark (president)
- Website: www.arema.org

The American Railway Engineering and Maintenance-of-Way Association (AREMA) is a North American railway industry group. It publishes recommended practices for the design, construction and maintenance of railway infrastructure, which are used in the United States and Canada.

== Overview ==
AREMA is headquartered in Lanham, Maryland, a suburb of Washington, D.C. As stated in their mission statement, AREMA promotes "The development and advancement of both technical and practical knowledge and recommended practices pertaining to the design, construction and maintenance of railway infrastructure." AREMA recognizes outstanding achievements in railway engineering with the annual William Walter Hay Award.

Beth Caruso was appointed as AREMA's executive director/CEO in September 2015. Prior to this appointment, she served as AREMA's director of administration. David Clark is the AREMA president and chairman of the board of governors for 2026–2027.

== History ==
AREMA was established on October 1, 1997, by the merger of four engineering associations:

- the American Railway Engineering Association
- the American Railway Bridge and Building Association
- the Roadmasters and Maintenance of Way Association
- the Communications and Signal Division of the Association of American Railroads

=== American Railway Engineering Association ===
Formed in 1899, it began publishing the Manual for Railway Engineering in 1905, and established many technical committees which are still functioning today in AREMA. It was headquartered in Chicago until 1979, when it moved to Washington, DC.

=== American Railway Bridge and Building Association ===
Formed in 1891 in St. Louis, Missouri, as the American International Association of Railway Superintendents of Bridges and Buildings, the association initially represented 40 railroads. The name was changed in 1907 to the American Railway Bridge and Building Association. The group provided a forum to exchange information and create solutions to problems that confront the railway industry.

=== Roadmasters and Maintenance of Way Association ===
The oldest of the groups was organized in 1883 by 61 roadmasters representing 24 railways. The association provided a means for maintenance officers to meet and discuss their mutual problems. Rail joints, switches, frogs and ties were among the subjects studied, leading to the standardization of maintenance practices.

=== Communications and Signal Division of the Association of American Railroads ===
In 1885, the Association of Telegraph and Telephone Superintendents was formed by the telegraph superintendents of the major railroads. In 1895, the Railway Signaling Club was organized at a meeting in Chicago, Illinois, and created a code of rules governing the operation of interlockings. In 1919, the Signaling Club became the Signal Division of the newly created American Railway Association (ARA) and the Telegraph Superintendents became its Telegraph and Telephone Section. The ARA became the Association of American Railroads (AAR) in 1934; the Signal Division was renamed the Signal Section and the Telegraph and Telephone was renamed the Communications Section. The two sections merged in 1961 to become the Communications and Signal Division of the AAR, which has now been merged into AREMA.

== Technical committees ==
AREMA has 29 technical committees, organized in six functional groups. The committees, whose volunteer members come from the railroad industry, meet on a regular basis and use their expertise to come up with the best methods to maintain a railroad.

- Structures
  - Timber Structures (Committee 7)
  - Concrete Structures & Foundations (Committee 8)
  - Seismic Design for Railway Structures (Committee 9)
  - Structures Maintenance & Construction (Committee 10)
  - Steel Structures (Committee 15)
  - Clearances (Committee 28)
- Passenger & Transit
  - Commuter & Intercity Rail Systems (Committee 11)
  - Rail Transit (Committee 12)
  - High Speed Rail Systems (Committee 17)
  - Electric Energy Utilization (Committee 33)
- Track
  - Roadway & Ballast (Committee 1)
  - Rail (Committee 4)
  - Track (Committee 5)
  - Maintenance of Way Work Equipment (Committee 27)
  - Ties (Committee 30)
- Engineering Services
  - Track Measuring and Assessment Systems (Committee 2)
  - Building & Support Facilities (Committee 6)
  - Environmental (Committee 13)
  - Yards & Terminals (Committee 14)
  - Economics of Railway Engineering & Operations (Committee 16)
  - Light Density & Short Line Railways (Committee 18)
  - Education & Training (Committee 24)
- Communications & Signals
  - Scales (Committee 34)
  - Highway-Rail Grade Crossing Warning Systems (Committee 36)
  - Signal Systems (Committee 37)
  - Information, Defect Detection & Energy Systems (Committee 38)
  - Positive Train Control (Committee 39)
- Maintenance
  - Engineering Safety Steering Team (Committee 40)
  - Track Maintenance Steering Team (Committee 41)
  - Signals Maintenance Steering Team (Committee 43)

== Recommended practices ==
AREMA publishes recommended practices in nine separate documents. Manual for Railway Engineering, Communications and Signals Manual, Practical Guide to Railway Engineering, and the Bridge inspection Handbook are four of AREMA's prime publications.

=== Manual for Railway Engineering ===
The AREMA Manual for Railway Engineering contains principles, data, specifications, plans and economics pertaining to the engineering, design and construction of the fixed plant of railways (except signals and communications), and allied services and facilities.

21 chapters are contained in four volumes, updated annually by the technical committees.

Consultants use the manual's recommendations as a basis for design. Many railroads use the manual as a basis for their track standards and may add to it to describe their specific needs.

=== Communications & Signals Manual of Recommended Practices ===
The AREMA Communications & Signals Manual of Recommended Practices contains recommended practices for railway communications and signaling.

24 sections are contained in five volumes, written and updated by the AREMA committees.

1. Administrative & General
2. Railroad Signal Systems
3. Highway-Rail Grade Crossing Warning Systems
4. Yard Systems
5. Defect Detection Systems
6. Relays
7. Signals
8. Track Circuits
9. Power Supply
10. Wire & Electrical Cable
11. Circuit Protection
12. Switches
13. Mechanical
14. Electrical Devices, Foundations, Hardware Materials
15. Materials
16. Vital Circuit & Software Design
17. Quality Principles
18. Inside Plant
19. Electrical Protection
20. Inductive Interference
21. Data Transmission
22. Radio
23. Communication-based Signaling
24. Positive Train Control

These practices are required for railroads in the United States by the Federal Railroad Administration and in Canada by Transport Canada.

== Proceedings online ==
An electronic version of AREMA's Procedures and Proceedings is available to members. The extensive library includes over 65 years of technical proceedings taken from the Roadmasters & Maintenance of Way Association proceedings and the American Railway Bridge and Building Association proceedings. Earlier Proceedings of the Annual Convention are available as digitized books.
