= Newark Railway =

Map of the Newark Railway

The Newark Railway was incorporated on December 10, 1890, and was a short, 1-mile connection between the Lehigh Valley Railroad's Newark and Roselle Railway and the Pennsylvania Railroad (PRR). Upon completion on Feb 16, 1891, all passenger traffic, which had previously been routed to the PRR at Metuchen, instead took the route from South Plainfield to Newark, where it connected with the PRR and continued to the PRR station in Jersey City. The Newark Railway also served a LVRR freight and coal depot at Pennsylvania Avenue, adjacent to the PRR junction.

In 1891 the LVRR consolidated the railroads along the Jersey City route into the Lehigh Valley Terminal Railway. Besides the Newark Railway, the other consolidated companies were the Roselle and South Plainfield Railway, the Newark and Roselle Railway the Newark and Passaic Railway, the Jersey City, Newark and Western Railway, the Jersey City Terminal Railway, and the Edgewater Railway.
