= Newark and Roselle Railway =

Railway in the north-eastern USA

Map of the Newark and Roselle Railway

The Newark and Roselle Railway was incorporated on Aug 28, 1889 by the Lehigh Valley Railroad (LVRR) to advance tracks from the terminus of the Roselle and South Plainfield Railway at Roselle, New Jersey to Pennsylvania Avenue in Newark. It formed part of the route connecting the LVRR's Easton and Amboy Railroad at South Plainfield to the Jersey City terminal.

Initially, the Roselle and South Plainfield Railroad had connected with the Central Railroad of New Jersey (CNJ) at Roselle, and LVRR trains had proceeded to Jersey City over the CNJ.

In 1891 the LVRR consolidated the railroads along the Jersey City route into the Lehigh Valley Terminal Railway. Along with the Newark and Roselle, the other consolidated companies were the Roselle and South Plainfield Railway, the Newark and Passaic Railway, the Newark Railway, the Jersey City, Newark, and Western Railway, the Jersey City Terminal Railway, and the Edgewater Railway.
