= Newark and Passaic Railway =

Railway in Newark, New Jersey

Map of the Newark and Passaic Railway

The Newark and Passaic Railway was incorporated on Nov 22, 1889 by the Lehigh Valley Railroad (LVRR). It was chartered as a short line in Newark, New Jersey from the Passaic River to a connection with the LVRR's Newark and Roselle Railway near Pennsylvania Avenue in Newark. The lower mile of its length closed a gap in the route of the LVRR from South Plainfield to Jersey City.

In 1891 the LVRR consolidated the railroads along the Jersey City route into the Lehigh Valley Terminal Railway. Along with the Newark and Passaic the other consolidated companies were the Roselle and South Plainfield Railway, the Newark and Roselle Railway, the Newark Railway, the Jersey City, Newark, and Western Railway, the Jersey City Terminal Railway, and the Edgewater Railway.

After consolidation, the upper portion of the line served as the Newark and Passaic Branch of the LVRR, running from the west end of Oak Island yard to Hamburg Place.
