= Oak Island Yard =

Freight rail yard in Newark, New Jersey

Coordinates: 40°42′31″N 74°08′17″W

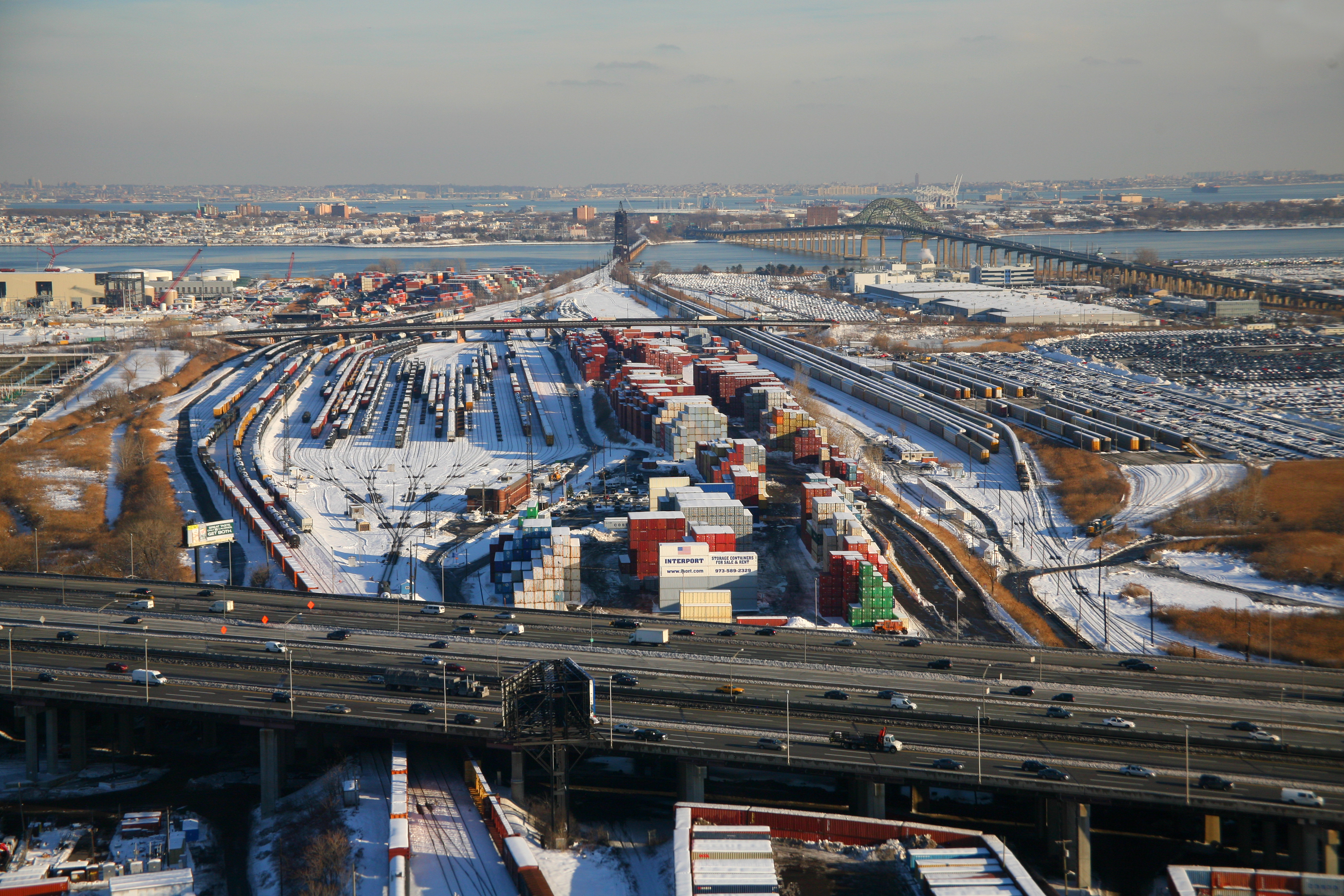
Oak Island Yard looking East

Oak Island Yard is a freight rail yard located north of Port Newark-Elizabeth Marine Terminal and Newark International Airport in an industrial area of Ironbound, Newark, New Jersey at 91 Bay Ave., United States. The sprawling complex includes engine house, classification yard, auto unloading terminal, and maintenance facilities. It has ten reception tracks, an automated hump, 30 relatively short classification tracks, and nine departure tracks. In 1999, it classified 800 to 1000 cars per day.

== History ==
The yard was built by the Lehigh Valley Railroad and opened 1903. After construction of the Upper Bay Bridge in 1929 vast amounts of landfill were used to raise the yard to accommodate the new grade. It became part of the Consolidated Rail Corporation (Conrail) in 1976, and in 1981 Conrail greatly expanded it. Currently it is jointly owned as part of North Jersey Shared Assets Area by the Norfolk Southern Railway and CSX, which took over Conrail operations in 1999. It is a support yard for the Port of New York and New Jersey ExpressRail system. The yard is listed on the New Jersey Register of Historic Places.

== Convergences ==
Several lines converge at the yard.

- The Conrail Lehigh Line travels to the west passing over the Northeast Corridor to run parallel Raritan Valley Line just west of the Hunter Connection. The Conrail Lehigh Line began operations in 1999 from the original Lehigh Line and took over Oak Island Yard access operations from the original Lehigh Line.
- The Passaic and Harsimus Line runs through the yard and heads north to cross the Passaic River and Hackensack River to Marion Junction.
- The Chemical Coast, known as the Garden State Secondary line heads south between the port and the airport.
- To the east lies the Lehigh Valley Railroad Bridge which spans Newark Bay to the National Docks Secondary to the Upper New York Bay.

== See also ==
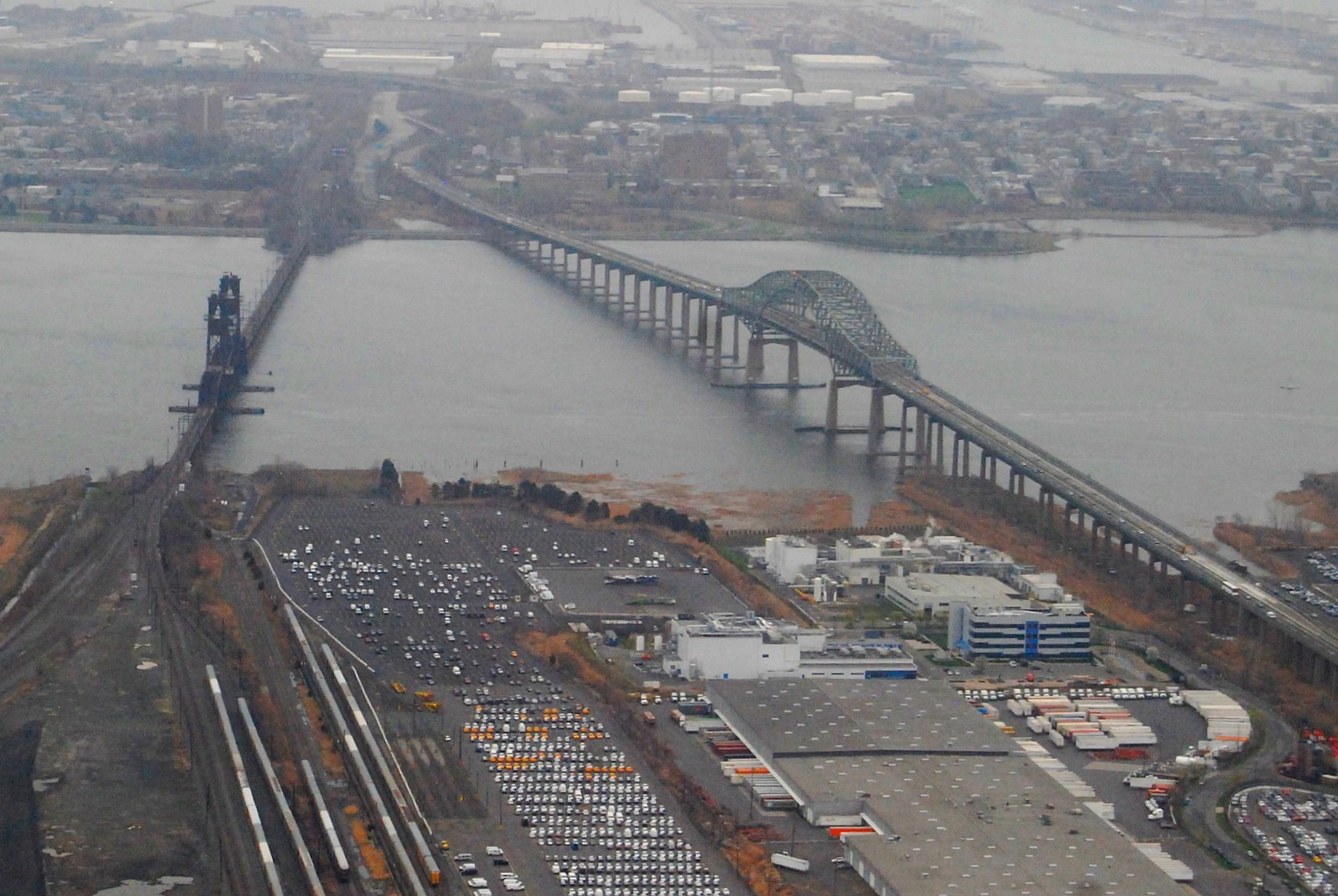
The Upper Bay Bridge for trains and the Newark Bay Bridge for vehicles cross Newark Bay east of Oak Island Yard

- List of rail yards
- Crescent Corridor
- Lehigh Valley Terminal Railway
- Timeline of Jersey City area railroads
- List of bridges, tunnels, and cuts in Hudson County, New Jersey
