= Jersey City, Newark and Western Railway =

Map of the Jersey City, Newark and Western Railway

The Jersey City, Newark and Western Railway was incorporated on July 6, 1889, and acquired by the Lehigh Valley Railroad (LVRR). Construction was completed in 1893. It started in Jersey City, New Jersey at a connection with the National Docks Railway in Communipaw east of the Central Railroad of New Jersey line, and extended westward on the bridge across Newark Bay to connect with the LVRR's Newark and Passaic Railway.

The connection with the National Docks Railway was used to reach the LVRR terminal in Jersey City. In 1895, the LVRR incorporated the Greenville and Hudson Railway and built a line parallel to the Nationals Docks Railway in 1900. Shortly thereafter, the LVRR obtained control of the National Docks Railway, and the Greenville and Hudson became redundant.

In 1891 the LVRR consolidated the railroads along the Jersey City route into the Lehigh Valley Terminal Railway. Along with the Jersey City, Newark and Western Railway, the other consolidated companies were the Roselle and South Plainfield Railway, the Newark and Roselle Railway, the Newark and Passaic Railway, the Newark Railway, the Jersey City Terminal Railway, and the Edgewater Railway.
