= Hayts Corners, Ovid & Willard Railroad =

Overview
- Termini: Hayts Corners; Willard Asylum for the Chronic Insane

Service
- Type: Rural branch line

History
- Opened: 14 May 1883
- Closed: 30 June 1936

Technical
- Line length: 4 mi (6.4 km)
- Track gauge: 4 ft 8 1/2 in (1,435 mm)

The Hayts Corners, Ovid & Willard Railroad was a 4-mile rural branch line (Willard Branch) of the Lehigh Valley Railroad running between the connection with the Ithaca branch of the Lehigh Valley at Hayts Corners and Willard Asylum for the Chronic Insane in Seneca County, New York. The history of the Willard Branch was tied with the history of the asylum at Willard.

== Asylum history ==
=== State Agricultural College of Ovid ===
The State Agricultural College of Ovid opened its doors in 1860 on the site of a former farm. The college building was located at the top of the hill, east of Willard Landing on Seneca Lake. When the Civil War erupted in 1861 the entire student body enlisted and in 1862 the college closed leaving New York State holding a $40,000 mortgage. When the Civil War ended in 1865 Ezra Cornell attempted to obtain the site but was unsuccessful.

=== Willard Asylum for the Chronic Insane ===
Later in 1865 the New York legislature enacted a bill co-sponsored by Dr. Sylvester D. Willard, who had recently died of typhus, authorizing the construction of a mental hospital at Willard. This was in response to a petition of Dorothea Dix concerning the deplorable conditions of the mentally ill in the county poor houses in 1843. By 1869 the construction of the initial phase of the Main Building was complete and the first patients admitted. The population grew very quickly;in 1870 several wings were added to the main building. At the same time the former agricultural college building was refurbished, named Branch and used to house women patients. Detached building number 1 "Maples" was constructed in 1872. By 1873 the population was 530 patients. Three more buildings were added by 1877 when Willard, at 475 acres (1500 patients) was the largest asylum in the United States. Produce from the farm and goods manufactured in the various shops allowed the asylum to be, for the most part, self-sufficient. One need was coal for heating during the cold winters. The hospital used 4000 tons of coal a year. Coal was brought down the Chemung Canal to Watkins Glen and then sent by lake steamer to Willard Landing. The coal would then be hauled to the various buildings. Moving coal from the lake landing to the various buildings proved to be difficult. The state was petitioned in 1877 for funds to construct a railroad to service the asylum.

== Railroad construction ==
=== Asylum Railroad ===
In 1877 the state approved the construction of a narrow gauge (3 ft) railroad. Construction was performed by the patients of the asylum and by the end of the year a line two and one eighth miles was in place running from the landing at the lake to Branch at the top of the hill. There were side tracks to the main building and detached buildings number 1 and 3. A (0-6-0T) steam engine was ordered from Baldwin Locomotive Works. Rolling stock consisted of 1 passenger car, 6 freight and coal cars, 2 swill cars and 1 lumber car. There were a few four wheel dump cars. Two of the buildings (detached buildings 2 and 4) had been built on the south side of the Simpson creek ravine, opposite the other buildings. For two years the asylum petitioned the state for funds to build an embankment across the ravine. Finally in 1881 the asylum built the embankment on their own with patient labor. The embarrassed state approved funds for the rail and ties to reach these two buildings.

=== Hayts Corners, Ovid & Willard Railroad ===
A new problem arose. The Chemung Canal had been constructed with 53 wooden locks saving a lot of money in construction costs but they proved to be a maintenance nightmare. The canal was never profitable and with the arrival of the railroads the asylum worried about the future reliability of lake shipments of coal and salt. The asylum petitioned the state and the Hatys Corners, Ovid & Willard Railroad was chartered on 15 September 1882 to make a connection between the asylum railroad and the Geneva, Ithaca and Sayre Railroad (owned by the Lehigh Valley Railroad (LV) since 1876) at Hayts Corners. The line was to be dual gauge. Grading had actually started in August 1882 and was completed before winter. The incomplete line was leased to the Geneva, Ithaca & Sayre Railroad (GI&S) on 27 December 1882. Work resumed in the spring; the GI&S supplied the ties, rail and ballast and work was essentially completed by April. A controversy arose over the charge per mile for passengers that was resolved by law on 11 May 1883. The line opened for business three days later.

== Operations ==
=== Asylum Railroad ===
Each day a train would leave the engine facility at the lake landing and begin to climb the hill. The train would stop at each building along the way. A light blue laundry car would drop off clean laundry and pick up dirty laundry. A red store car was equipped with a desk and pigeon holes for each building. Requests for supplies would be submitted in the morning. A full four wheel garbage dump car would be picked up at each building. When the train reached the Branch at the top of the hill it would back down to the "piggery" and leave the garbage cars. In the afternoon the train would leave a clean empty garbage car and the supplies requested in the morning. Coal was delivered as needed.

=== Hayts Corners, Ovid & Willard Railroad ===
==== Passenger ====
When operations started the line ran three passenger trains each way. Two buses (horse drawn) met the train at the Ovid Station. Bus fare was 10 cents and train fare was 15 cents (from Ovid?). By June 1, 1884 there were five trains in each direction. In 1899 a new passenger station was constructed along main street in Willard.

==== Freight ====
The line saw a brisk freight business. In November 1883 the Ovid Independent reported that 268 freight cars passed over the line that month. In 1884 the iron rail was replaced with 40 lb steel rail. The line remained dual gauge for a few years. In the report of the GI&S for 1885 had no mention of any narrow gauge track. A photo of the Branch while under reconstruction in 1886 shows dual gauge track. The GI&S had steep grades in and out of Ithaca impeding freight operations. The LV decided to construct a freight line that bypassed Ithaca running down the east side of Seneca Lake. The line was complete by 1892. It passed just east of the Branch in a long rock cut. A station was built just south of Simpson Creek and a spur was laid from the station to connect with the asylum line by the bakery. Most freight bound for Willard used this new connection.

===== Willard =====
In 1883 the state allocated funds for the construction of a coal dock next to the freight depot by the Branch. The line within the asylum was reconfigured and converted to standard gauge about the same time as the construction of the Seneca Lake bypass. A new 0-4-0T was ordered from Baldwin. Five switches, 19,980 feet of steel rail and 2,000 white oak ties were used.

===== Ovid =====
Kinne Brothers constructed a lumber yard, coal trestles and a grain elevator at the Ovid Station. Standard Oil had storage tanks at the depot. For a number of years a fruit evaporator produced dried fruit for shipment. Boyce Moters in Ovid received shipments of autos and tractors from the depot. Residents moving in and out of Ovid took advantage and shipped their households by rail. The traveling circus and yearly Redpath Co.'s Chautauque came and went by rail.

== Abandonment ==
The arrival of the Seneca Lake bypass eliminated most of the freight traffic between Ovid and Willard. Passenger traffic fell off as more people bought automobiles. In 1935 the Willard State Hospital decided to convert to central steam heat for all the buildings. When the system was in place the Asylum railroad was removed. Only a spur from the main line to the bakery and the steam plant remained. That same year passenger service ended between Willard and Ovid. The tracks were soon removed. In 1937 passenger service ended between Ovid and Hayts Corners. The line to Ovid saw occasional freight service to the coal trestle and Seneca Lumber at Ovid. Finally in 1959 the tracks between Ovid and Hayts Corners were removed.
