= Harbortown, Perth Amboy =

Populated place in Hudson County, New Jersey, US

Harbortown
- Unincorporated community
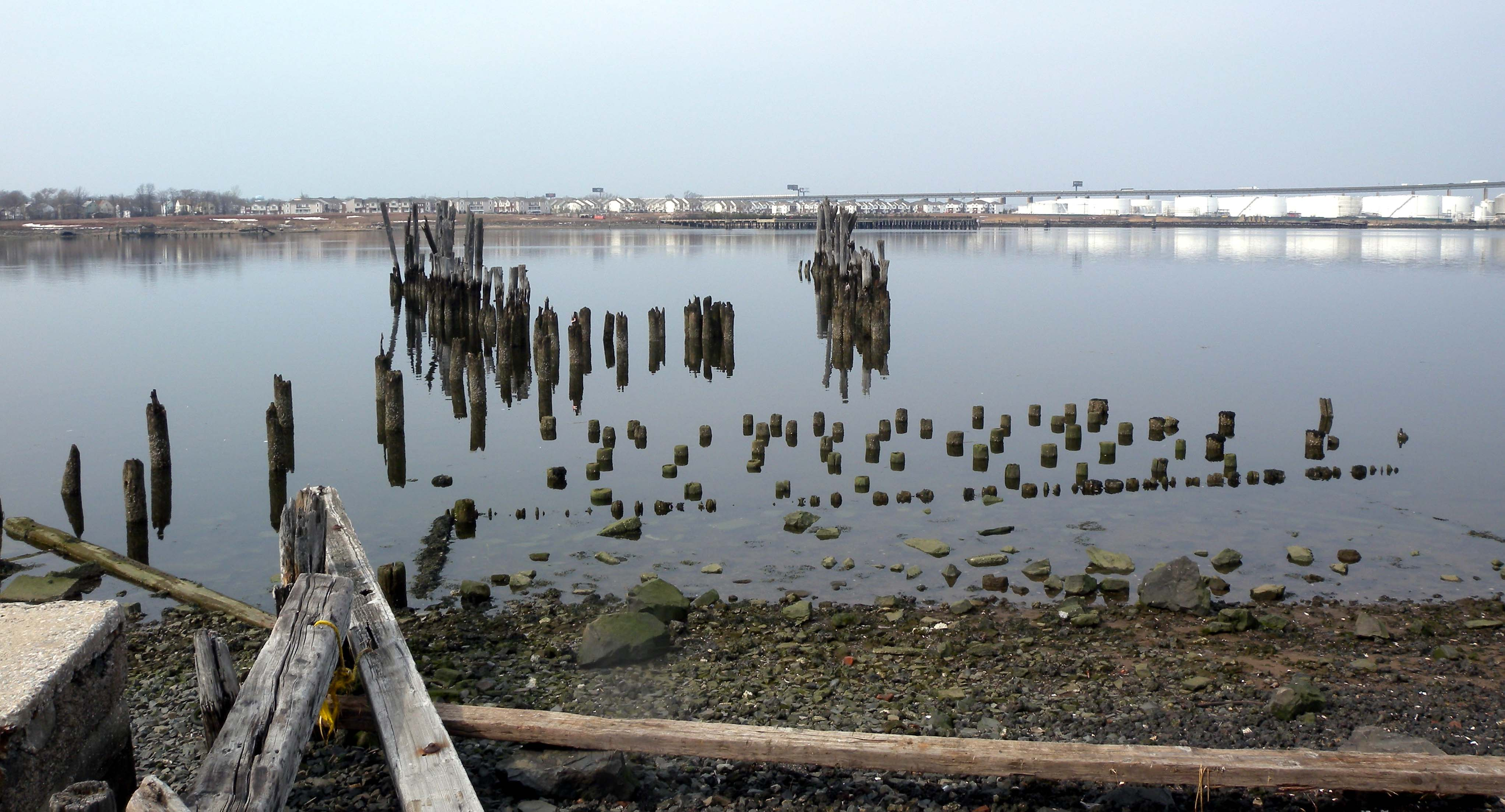
- Harbortown on the Arthur Kill between the traditional waterfront and tank farm

- Harbortown, Perth Amboy, Middlesex County, New Jersey
- Coordinates: 40°31′10″N 74°15′36″W
- Country: United States
- State: New Jersey
- County: Middlesex
- City: Perth Amboy
- Established: 1987
- Elevation: 20 ft (6.1 m)
- Postal code: 08861
- Area code: 732

Harbortown is a planned community neighborhood in Perth Amboy in Middlesex County, in the U.S. state of New Jersey. It is situated south of the Outerbridge Crossing along the Arthur Kill, between the city's traditional waterfront and the Kinder Morgan terminal The 135-acre area was the Lehigh Valley Railroad's (LVRR) Easton and Amboy Railroad's marshaling yards where coal was loaded onto barges until the LVRR's bankruptcy in 1976.

== See also ==
- Neighborhoods in Perth Amboy, New Jersey
