= Lehigh Valley Terminal Railway =

Map of the Lehigh Valley Terminal Railway.

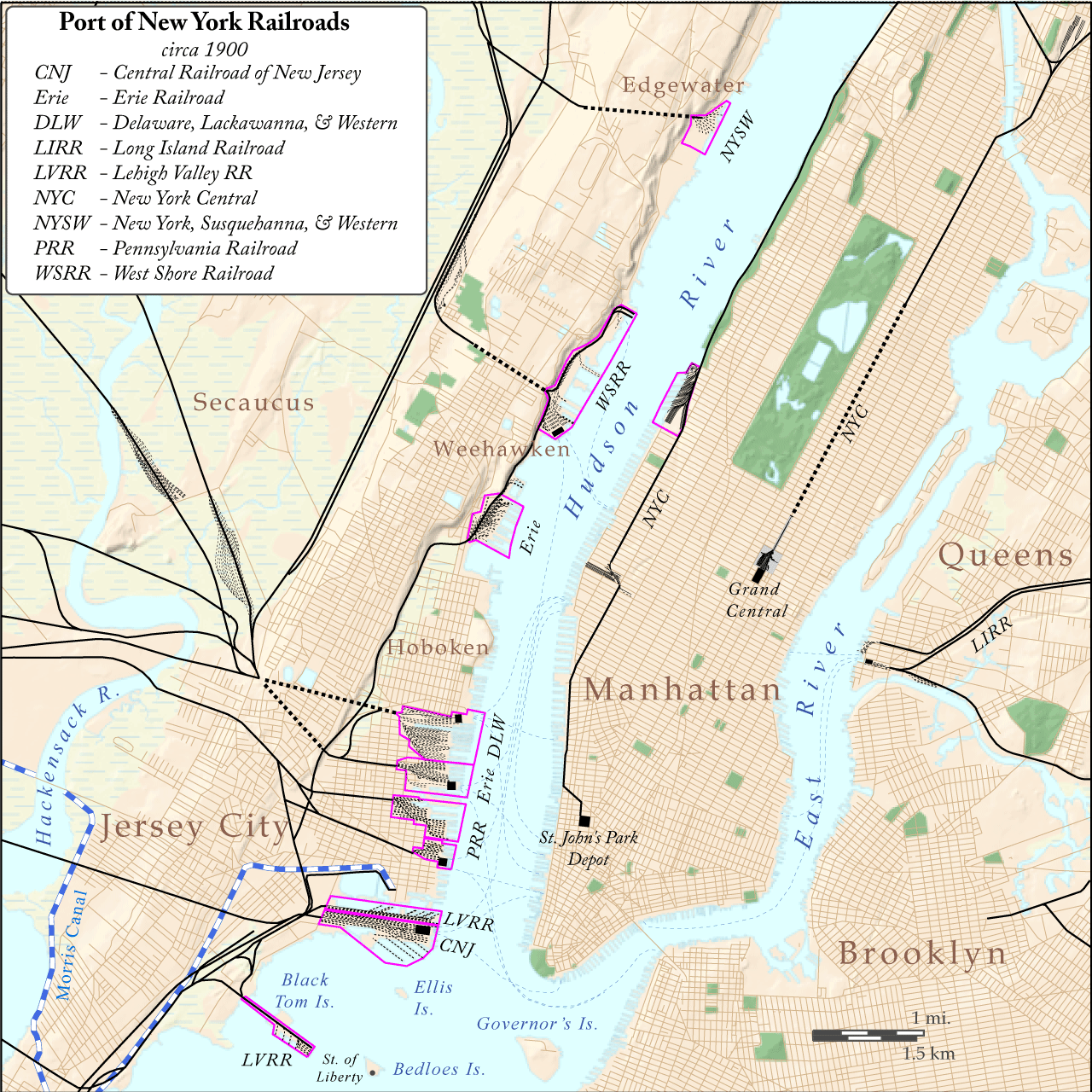
Map of the Jersey City waterfront, circa 1900.

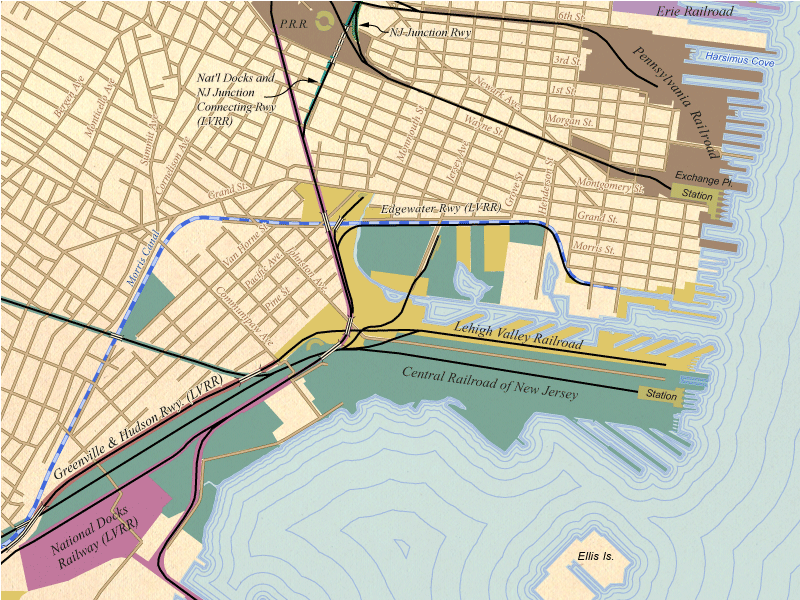
Map of the Jersey City terminal, circa 1910.

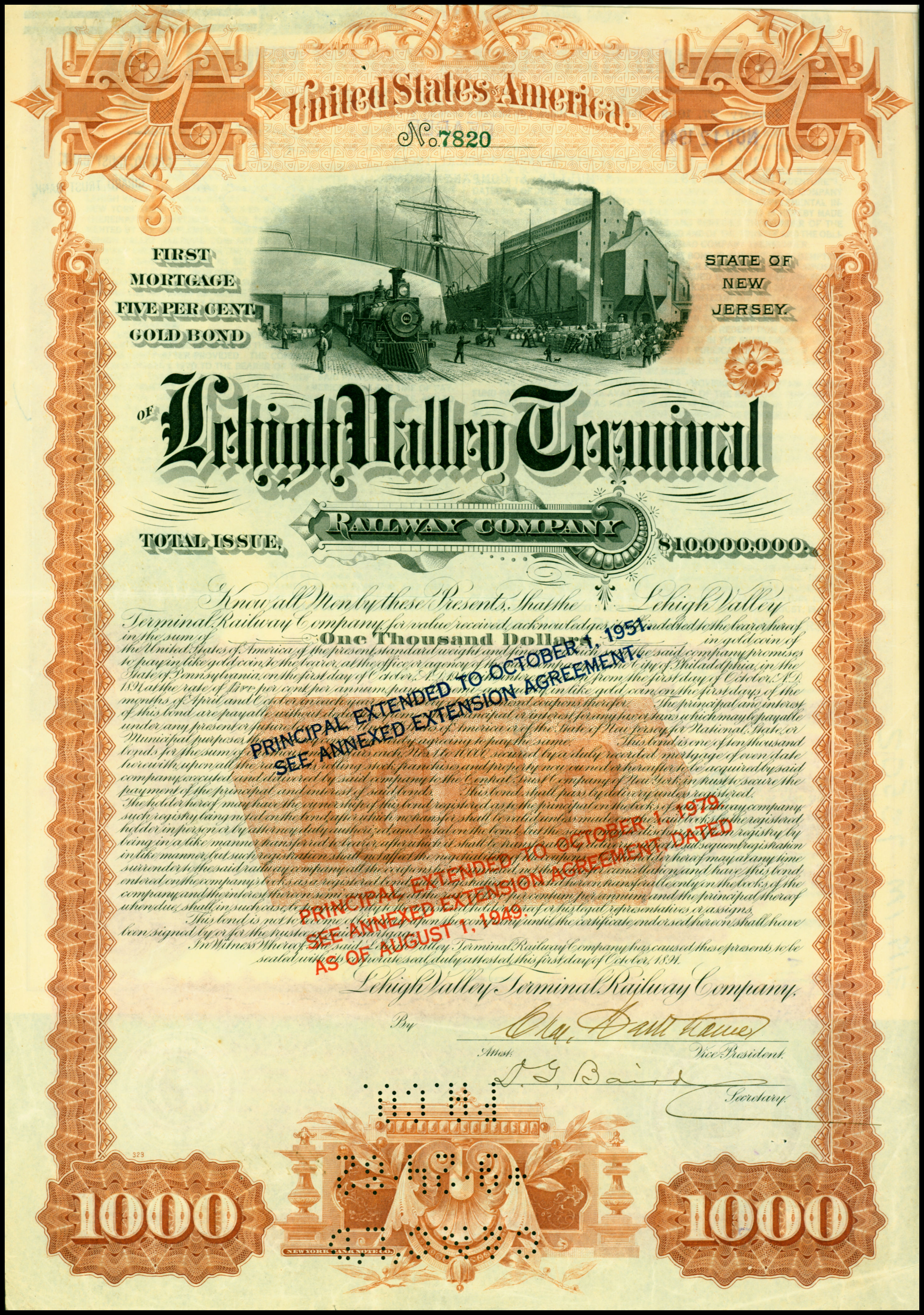
Gold Bond of the Lehigh Valley Terminal Railway, issued 1. October 1891

The Lehigh Valley Terminal Railway was a Lehigh Valley Railroad company organized in 1891 through the consolidation of the companies that formed the Lehigh Valley's route from South Plainfield through Newark to Jersey City via its bridge across Newark Bay. Until 1895, when the Greenville and Hudson Railway was constructed, the Lehigh Valley depended on the National Docks Railway to reach the Hudson River terminal.

In 1903, all the Lehigh Valley's lines in New Jersey were consolidated under the name of Lehigh Valley Railroad Company of New Jersey.

== Timeline of the Lehigh Valley Terminal Railway ==
- 1871 - The Lehigh Valley leases the Morris Canal, which includes the canal basin at South Cove in Jersey City.
- 1872 - The Lehigh Valley acquires land on the south side of the Morris Canal basin, intending it for a proposed railroad, the New Jersey West Line, which was never built.
- 1875 - The Easton and Amboy Railroad opens for traffic. Passenger traffic is routed onto the Pennsylvania Railroad at Metuchen.
- 1887 - The Roselle and South Plainfield Railway opens on Dec 17. Freight traffic connects to the Central Railroad of New Jersey at Roselle.
- 1887 - The Lehigh Valley settles a long legal battle with the Central Railroad of New Jersey, opening the way to build a Jersey City terminal on the land originally purchased in 1872 for the New Jersey West Line.
- 1889 - The Jersey City terminal opens as the Jersey City Terminal Railway.
- 1890 - The Edgewater Railway is formed to construct lines on the north side of the Morris Canal basin.
- 1890 - The Newark and Passaic Railway builds a freight yard and coal depot at Hamburg Place, Newark.
- 1890 - The LVRR purchases a half interest in the National Docks Railway.
- 1891 - The Newark and Roselle Railway and the Newark Railway open to connect with the PRR in Newark. On February 16, passenger traffic through Metuchen is discontinued in favor of the LVRR's own line at South Plainfield.
- 1891 - The companies are consolidated as the Lehigh Valley Terminal Railway Company. The route to Jersey City is still incomplete due to legal and engineering difficulties with the Jersey City, Newark and Western Railway bridge across Newark Bay. The consolidated companies are:

Roselle and South Plainfield Railway
Newark and Roselle Railway
Newark and Passaic Railway
Newark Railway
Jersey City, Newark and Western Railway
Jersey City Terminal Railway
Edgewater Railway

- 1892 - The route opens for traffic across Newark Bay to a connection with the National Docks Railway in Jersey City. (see:Lehigh Valley Railroad Bridge
- 1895 - The Lehigh Valley creates the Greenville and Hudson Railway to construct a line roughly parallel to the National Docks Railway from the Newark Bay bridge to the Jersey City terminal. Upon completion in 1900, the LVRR has a wholly owned route from the coalfields of Pennsylvania to the Hudson River.
- 1900 - The Lehigh Valley acquires complete control of the National Docks Railway.
- 1901 - The Lehigh Valley acquires the facilities of the National Docks Storage Company on Black Tom Island.
- 1903 - The Oak Island Yard is opened in Newark.
- 1903 - The Lehigh Valley Terminal Railway is consolidated into the Lehigh Valley Railroad Company of New Jersey.
