= Roselle and South Plainfield Railway =

Railroad in New Jersey

Map of the Roselle and South Plainfield Railway

The Roselle and South Plainfield Railway was a railroad built by the Lehigh Valley Railroad (LVRR) in 1888 to connect the LVRR's Easton and Amboy Railroad with the Central Railroad of New Jersey (CNJ), and provided access over the CNJ to the Hudson River waterfront in Jersey City. The LVRR had built coal docks in Perth Amboy when it built the Easton and Amboy in the 1870s, but it desired a terminal on the Hudson River close to New York City.

The LVRR strove throughout the 1880s to acquire a route to the Jersey City waterfront. The first leg of that project was the Roselle and South Plainfied. Initially, the LVRR contracted with the CNJ for rights from Roselle to Jersey City, but the LVRR eventually constructed its own route to its terminal in Jersey City over the Newark and Roselle Railway, the Newark and Passaic Railway, the Jersey City, Newark, and Western Railway, and the Jersey City Terminal Railway.

The railroad was incorporated on November 30, 1885 to build a railroad between a point on the Easton and Amboy Railroad near South Plainfield to a point at or near Roselle. Work began in 1887, and was completed on December 17, 1888.

In 1891, the LVRR consolidated the company into the Lehigh Valley Terminal Railway, along with the other companies which formed the route from South Plainfield to the Jersey City terminal.
