= Upper Bay Bridge =

Bridge in Newark and Bayonne, New Jersey

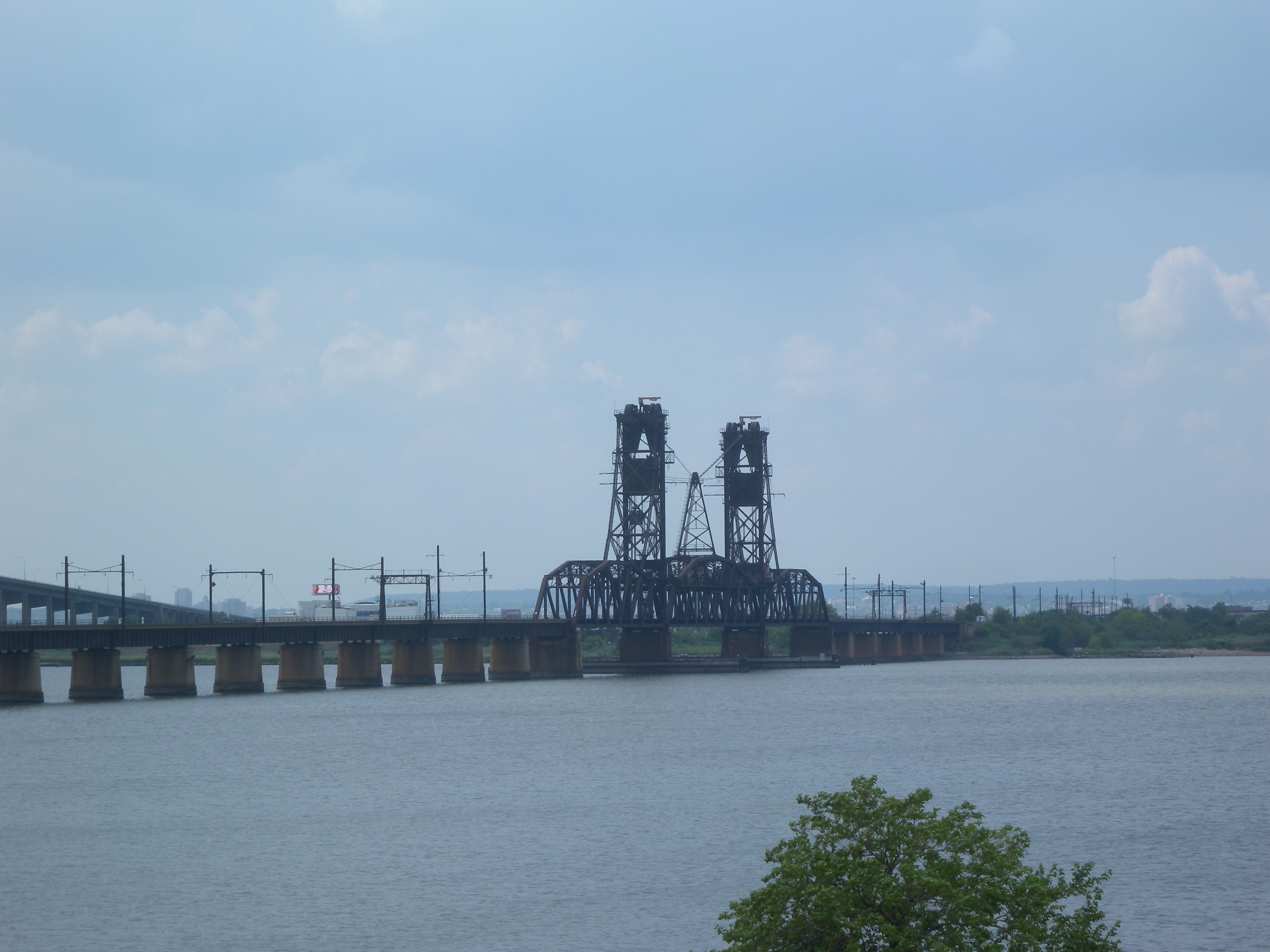
- Coordinates: 40°41′57″N 74°07′10″W
- Carries: North Jersey Shared Assets
- Crosses: Newark Bay
- Locale: Newark and Bayonne; New Jersey
- Official name: Upper Bay Bridge
- Other name(s): Bridge K072; Lehigh Valley Drawbridge
- Owner: Conrail Shared Assets (CSAO)
- Maintained by: Conrail

Characteristics
- Design: Vertical lift bridge
- Total length: 3,044 ft (928 m)
- Clearance above: 35-39 feet

History
- Opened: 1930

Location
- Interactive map of Upper Bay Bridge

The Upper Bay Bridge, or the Lehigh Valley Railroad Bridge, is a vertical lift bridge spanning the Newark Bay in northeastern New Jersey. It is used by CSX Transportation travelling through the North Jersey Shared Assets Area of the United States rail network along the National Docks Secondary line. The bridge is just north and parallel to the New Jersey Turnpike's Newark Bay Bridge. A notable train using the bridge is the Juice Train, which originates in Florida.

== Description ==
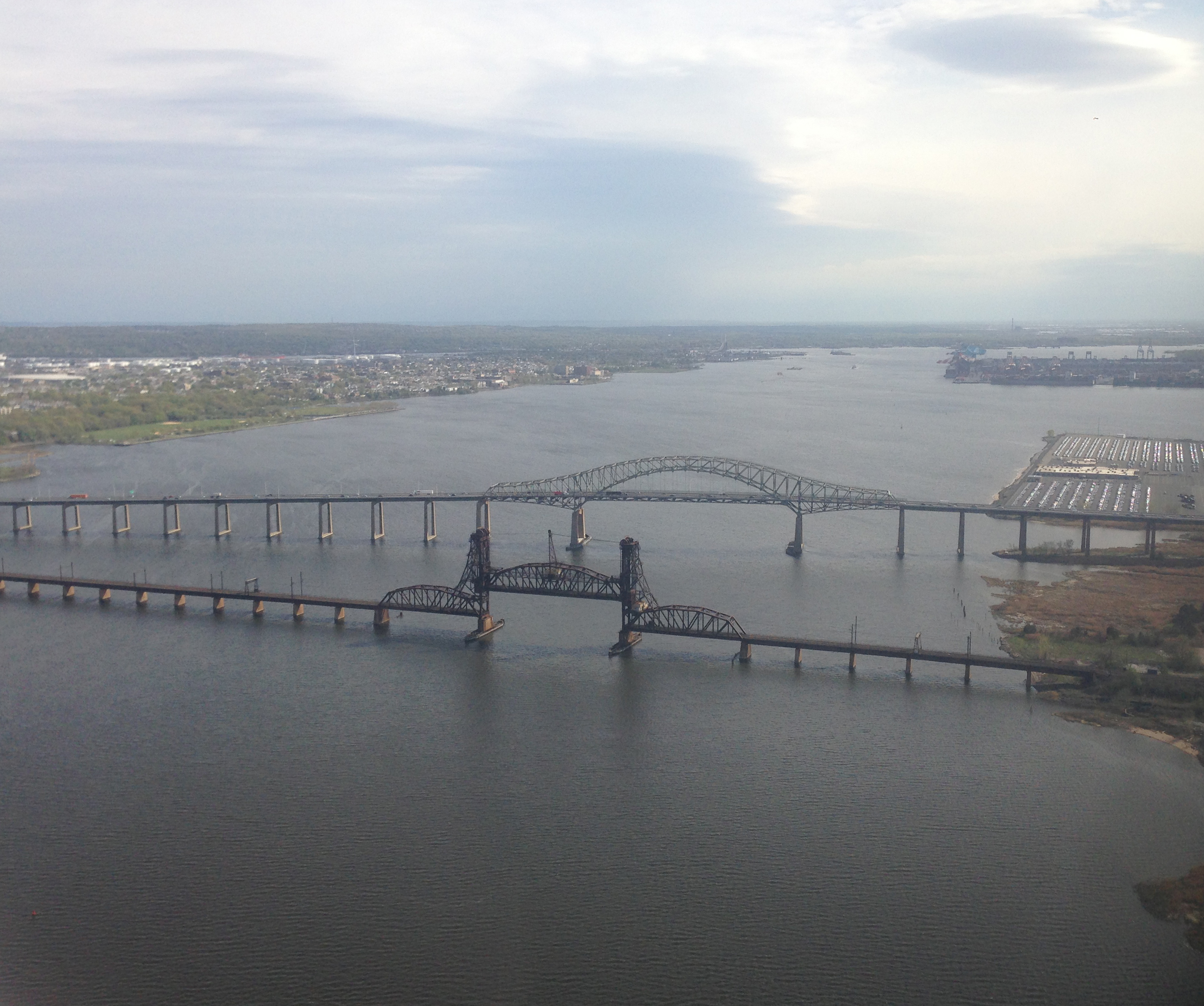
View of the Upper Bay Bridge (foreground) from a plane landing at Newark Liberty International Airport, with the Newark Bay Bridge behind it

The western end of the bridge is near Oak Island Yard north of Port Newark-Elizabeth Marine Terminal and Newark International Airport in an industrial area of Ironbound Newark. Its eastern end is in Bayonne, where rail lines continue east across Bergen Hill to maritime, industrial, distribution complexes at Port Jersey, Greenville Yards, Constable Hook, and others along the shores of the Upper New York Bay and Kill Van Kull. New York New Jersey Rail, LLC operates a carfloat at this end with transfers to Bush Terminal Yard at the former Bush Terminal. Connections to the rail network to the north are made using the National Docks line through Jersey City and the Long Dock Tunnel to Croxton Yard.

== History ==
Bridge is part of line shown in red between Newark and Jersey City

The rail route started in 1893 as part the Jersey City, Newark and Western Railway which was soon absorbed by the Lehigh Valley Terminal Railway to reach terminals on the North River and at Black Tom. The Pennsylvania Railroad also used the bridge to reach its Greenville Yard on Upper New York Bay. The original wooden trestle structure was damaged by fire with great losses on June 14, 1913. It was replaced by the companies three months later in what was considered a formidable feat of being re-built in twelve days after construction had started.

The current bridge, built from 1928–1930, is the last of the rail bridges across the bay or Kearny Point at its northern end. The CRRNJ Newark Bay Bridge downstream and the Newark and New York Railroad Bridge upstream have been dismantled.

== See also ==
- Lehigh Valley Terminal Railway
- Oak Island Yard
- Lehigh Line (Conrail)
- Timeline of Jersey City area railroads
- List of bridges, tunnels, and cuts in Hudson County, New Jersey
- Marion Junction
- Hackensack RiverWalk
