= Easton and Amboy Railroad =

Railroad in New Jersey, US

Map of the Easton and Amboy Railroad

Easton and Amboy Railroad was a railroad built across central New Jersey by the Lehigh Valley Railroad (LVRR) in the 1870s. The line was built to connect the Lehigh Valley Railroad coal hauling operations in Pennsylvania with the Port of New York and New Jersey to serve consumer markets in New York metropolitan area. Until it was built, the terminus of the LVRR had been at Phillipsburg, New Jersey on the Delaware River opposite Easton, Pennsylvania. It is now part of Norfolk Southern Railway operations, partially the Lehigh Line

The Lehigh Valley Railroad bought the charter to the Perth Amboy and Bound Brook Railroad and also formed a new railroad company, the Bound Brook and Easton Railroad, to run across Western New Jersey from Phillipsburg to Bound Brook. These two railroads were combined under the name "Easton and Amboy Railroad".

Construction commenced in 1872 and was completed in 1875. For three years, engineering and financial difficulties delayed the crucial tunnel through the Musconetcong Mountains at Pattenburg. The Lehigh Valley Railroad then stepped in, purchasing the E&A and completing the line to Easton in 1875.

At Perth Amboy, a tidewater terminal was built on the Arthur Kill comprising a large coal dock used to transport coal into New York City. The tracks were laid and started hauling coal in 1875. Operations continued until the LVRR's bankruptcy in 1976. The marshalling yard is now the residential area known as Harbortown.

Passenger traffic connected with the Pennsylvania Railroad (PRR) at Metuchen and continued to the PRR'S Exchange Place terminus in Jersey City. That connection was discontinued in 1891 after the LVRR established its own route to Jersey City from South Plainfield.

Eventually, the Easton and Amboy Railroad was absorbed into the parent Lehigh Valley Railroad and it was used as a connection to the New York area, with a terminus in Jersey City.

== See also ==
- Lehigh Valley Terminal Railway
- Roselle and South Plainfield Railway
