= Mountain Top Yard =

Lehigh Valley Railroad
- LV system map

Overview
- Headquarters: New York City, New York
- Reporting mark: LV
- Locale: New Jersey; Pennsylvania; New York
- Dates of operation: 1846–1976
- Successor: Conrail

Technical
- Length: 1,362 miles (2,192 kilometres)

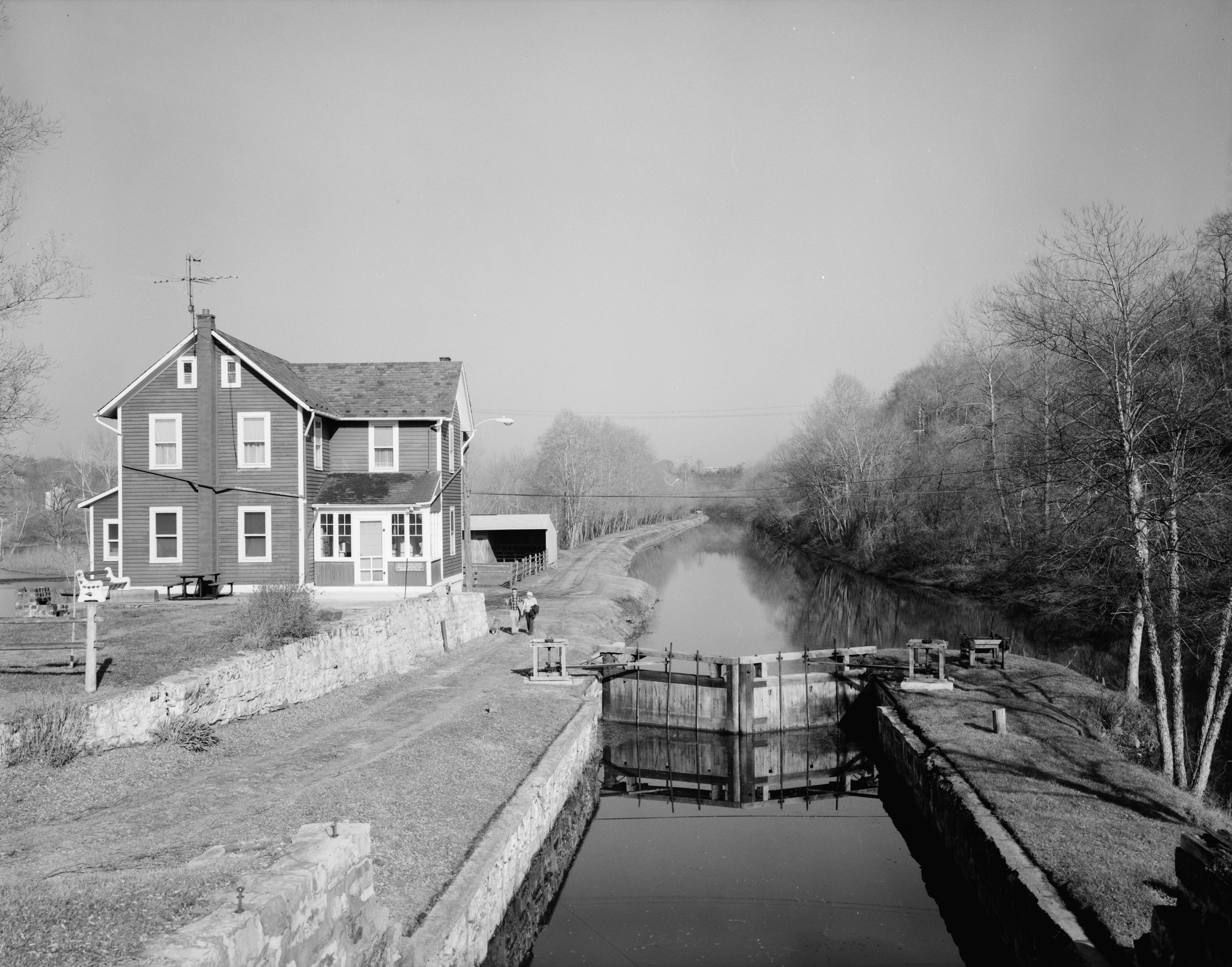
The historic Lehigh Canal

Mountain Top yard or Penobscot yard is a rail yard in Mountain Top, Pennsylvania. It was built by the Lehigh Coal & Navigation Company (LC&N) in response to an 1837 bill authorizing a right of way and was established by 1840, at least as a construction camp for the Ashley Planes, in support of the construction of the Lehigh and Susquehanna Railroad trackage and operations to join the northern Anthracite Coal Region from barge loading docks along the Susquehanna (above and below the Navigations of the Pennsylvania Canal) in Pittston, in the Wyoming Valley, with the Lehigh Canal.

== History ==
Penobscot Knob or Mount Penobscot, looming above the local terrain, was one of the last terrain obstacles to north-south travel — following after several barrier ranges in the ridge-and-valley Appalachians above the improvements to the Lehigh River, allowing water transport over 80 miles inland from Philadelphia's piers — a barrier therefore preventing west to east shipping of coal in the fading days of the canal era, but one in which railroad technology was leaping ahead year by year. LC&N, a high-tech company and major corporation of the 1820s-1870s, had already built the Lehigh Canal and the country's second railroad, the Mauch Chunk & Summit Hill Railroad, to ship coal the ten miles of gravity railroad to the loading facility above the head end of the improved Navigations Lehigh River and the Delaware Canal and Delaware River.

The large yard, and the purpose-built company town, Sayre, Pennsylvania, were founded as part of a planned program of expansion and extension to the young railroad's infrastructure—the yard was but one benchmark on the way to completing the goal of establishing competitive passenger rail service between New York City, as well as cities in Delaware such as Wilmington, cities in central New Jersey such as Trenton, and Eastern Pennsylvania cities including Philadelphia with Chicago and other Great Lakes Cities via Buffalo, New York. The Lehigh Valley was primarily first and foremost a coal road which transported high-grade Anthracite to the big cities of the east and to steel mills along the Great Lakes and to the area in and around Chicago. The yard is a waypoint along the historic rail corridor that extends along the left bank Susquehanna River through the RBMN Duryea Yard and Mountain Top Yards down along the route of the historic Lehigh Canal and across the Delaware at Easton, Pennsylvania.

Late in 1871, the competing upstarts calling themselves the Lehigh Valley Railroad (LV) established themselves above and across the same pass in 1871 and extended that storied road to Sayre Yard, astride the state line between Waverly, New York and Sayre, Pennsylvania.

Until its dismantlement under Conrail, the yard engine maintenance building had the largest structure in the United States devoted to the maintenance and construction of railroad locomotives. The yard was acquired by Reading Blue Mountain and Northern Railroad in 1996 during the dissolution of Conrail, which had acquired the property in 1976 when the Lehigh and Susquehanna Railroad joined its properties to that ill-fated conglomerate enterprise.

== Geography ==
Mountain Top, Pennsylvania, is a railroad town once named Penobscot, built beside the yard to house its employees and those of the nearby mines. The town is located at 41°8′7″N 75°54′16″W (41.1353022, -75.9044749) in the shadow of Mount Penobscot (or Penobscot Knob) and is located in the saddle-shaped mountain pass atop the ridgeline between the Susquehanna River basin to the north and west and the Lehigh River basin to the east and south, so sits astride an important land communications corridor bridging the two watersheds below. It is 8 miles (13 km) northwest of White Haven at the head end of the Lehigh River gorge and in the heights above Hazleton, Pennsylvania, 10 miles (16 km) south of Wilkes-Barre on Pennsylvania Route 309. Consequently, even though regional railroads are much diminished in scope and influence, Mountain Top yard, once used as a marshaling yard at the top of the Ashley Planes funicular (cable driven) railway, is still an important regional element of the transportation infrastructure connecting Allentown and Philadelphia with points north and west via trackage to several yards in New York State. Mountain Top's yard was the upper terminal end of the historic Lehigh and Susquehanna Railroad's Ashley Planes funicular railways (first begun 1837), which lifted freight over the steep climb from the Ashley neighborhood in Wilkes-Barre and site of a large transfer yard bypassed by the former trackage of the Lehigh Valley Railroad and leased to the Central Railroad of New Jersey.

Mountain Top is elevated at 1,558 feet (475 m) above sea level.
