= List of killings by law enforcement officers in the United States, April 2012 =

This is a list of people reported killed by non-military law enforcement officers in the United States in April 2012, whether in the line of duty or not, and regardless of reason or method. The listing documents the occurrence of a death, making no implications regarding wrongdoing or justification on the part of the person killed or officer involved. Killings are arranged by date of the incident that caused death. Different death dates, if known, are noted in the description. The table below lists 40 people.

== April 2012 ==
Date	Name (Age) of Deceased	City, State	Description
2012‑04‑30	Martel, Jonathan (40)	Cambridge, Vermont	Officers were pursuing Martel as a suspect in a home invasion when one of them spotted him in a wooded area. Martel refused to comply with orders, and pointed what appeared to be a gun at the officer. The officer shot Martel, and then discovered the object in his hands was a cell phone. Martel told the officer that he pointed the phone at him, because he wanted to die.
2012-04-30	David Strong (27)	Chicago, Illinois	Officers responded to a report of burglary in progress and surrounded the building. Suspects were ordered to surrender but instead stole a vehicle that was inside the building and rammed through a garage door. An officer was injured and the suspects were driving towards other officers when multiple officers opened fire, killing Strong and injuring his accomplices.
2012-04-29	Tatum, Carl Anthony	Apple Valley, Minnesota	Officers were responding to a domestic dispute and found a man in an agitated state. When they attempted to arrest him, he allegedly went inside the home, retrieved a gun, and fired at officers. An officer shot him multiple times, killing him.
2012-04-26	Clark, James (32)	Lawrenceville, Georgia	Clark was shot in his driveway following a 911 call that brought officers to the home. The caller stated that Clark was suicidal and had cut himself and fired two shots. When officers arrived, Clark was in his driveway holding what was identified by police as a Remington 721 deer rifle. After 15 minutes of attempted negotiation, Clark was shot by the officers after he allegedly began walking toward them. Clark's father, 65, and brother, 34, soon arrived on the scene and were arrested after "yelling obscenities at officers for several minutes." The two men were charged with disorderly conduct.
2012-04-24	Steven Brandt	Phoenix, Arizona	A man named Dan Ruble called police to say that Brandt, his girlfriend's estranged husband, was in his driveway with a gun. Ruble was at work when he learned that Brandt was at his home, and met police at a family member's house. The officer asked Ruble to accompany her to his home. When they arrived, Brandt opened fire on Ruble, killing him, and the officer shot and killed Brandt.
2012-04-23	McMullan, Robert J. (51)	Fairfield, California	Officer Adam Ponce was following up on a report of suspicious behavior possibly linked to McMullan. McMullan "quickly became confrontational" and, after a violent struggle, was shot twice in the chest.
2012-04-23	Curtiss, David (45)	Booneville, Mississippi	Officers were responding to a domestic violence call when they shot and killed Curtiss.
2012-04-22	Newsuan, Kenado (31)	Philadelphia, Pennsylvania	An officer responded to report of a naked man in the road. The officer reported that the man appeared to be on drugs and attempted to subdue him with a Taser. A scuffle ensued during which the officer's gun holster was ripped from his pants. The officer fired five times, striking Newsuan three times. Newsuan was pronounced dead at a local hospital.
2012-04-21	Edwards, Sharmel (49)	Las Vegas, Nevada	Police followed the vehicle Edwards was driving after her male friend had reported it stolen and that she was in possession of a handgun. After the vehicle stopped, police attempted communication by loudspeaker for 30 minutes. At that point, Edwards exited the vehicle. Police report both hands were on a gun. A witness reports both hands were in the air. Five officers fired on Edwards, hitting her multiple times. She died at the scene.
2012-04-21	Ferri, Vincent (41)	Loganville, Georgia	Officers attempted to serve Ferri a warrant for a murder. Ferri barricaded himself in his home. After a 13-hour standoff policed used tear gas and an exchange of gunfire ensued. Ferri was found shot in the head. It was later determined that the fatal shot was from a police officer. Ferri was armed with multiple weapons and hundreds of rounds of ammunition.
2012-04-21	Snyder, Christopher Wayne (28)	Alma, Arkansas	An officer stopped Snyder for a speeding violation. Snyder fled on foot until he was caught by the officer. When the officer attempted to place handcuffs on Snyder, he attempted to choke the officer who then fatally shot him.
2012-04-21	Truelove, Bobby Joe	Oklahoma City, Oklahoma	An OKCPD officer was responding to several calls about vehicle break-ins at an apartment complex. During a struggle, the officer used a TASER on Truelove, but when that was not effective, he shot Truelove.
2012-04-21	unnamed male	Calumet City, Illinois	Officers responded to report of gunfire outside a bar. The officers found two gunshot victims. A man shot at the officers, who returned fire, killing the man.
2012-04-19	Gonzales, David Paul	Las Vegas, Nevada	Police attempted to pull over a car with a non-working tail light, but the driver sped away and officers used a PIT maneuver to stop the car. Gonzales exited the vehicle and reportedly fired a gun at them. Officer Patrick Burke then shot and killed Gonzales.
2012-04-18	unnamed male	Houston, Texas	Suspect attempted armed robbery of three plainclothes narcotics officers in the parking lot behind a restaurant. Two officers shot suspect when he threatened to shoot the third officer.
2012-04-17	Carnes, Bryan Keith (44)	The Woodlands, Texas	An officer attempted to stop a suspect for a traffic violation. Suspect did not stop and led officer on a chase. Officers placed spikes on roadway and three of suspect's tires were deflated. Suspect's vehicle crashed. As officers approached vehicle, suspect reportedly yelled "Shoot me" and reached under his seat. An officer fired at least three shots. Suspect was taken to hospital where he died.
2012-04-17	Julio Angel DeJesus	Keene, New Hampshire	Officers responded to a report of a burglary of a business. Two men were apprehended and one fled in a vehicle. He parked the vehicle and got out, but when officers ran after him he got back into the vehicle and tried to drive off. Two officers fired at the vehicle, killing the suspect.
2012-04-16	Ramirez, George Israel (32)	Keyes, California	Deputy Art Parra Jr. shot Ramirez three times while responding to a domestic incident. Witnesses say Ramirez complied with Parra's commands, but the officer fired his taser at Ramirez when he asked why he was being arrested. Ramirez fell to the floor and was shot after he got up. Witnesses say the officer threatened to use his firearm and that Ramirez told him to shoot him.
2012-04-14	Robinson, Darrell C (22)	Dolton, Illinois	Officers responded to sounds of gunfire outside a bar. Robinson had shot another man. Robinson shot at officers then fled. Officers exchanged gunfire with him twice before Robinson was shot. Robinson was pronounced dead at a local hospital.
2012-04-13	Collins, Timothy F., Jr. (17)	Wichita, Kansas	Collins was shot in the head by police during a home invasion.
2012-04-13	Petrie, Gary	Gambrills, Maryland	Officer responded to a report of a domestic disturbance. A struggle broke out between the officer and a man at the residence. The officer "was in fear for his life" and shot the man, who died at a local hospital.
2012-04-13	unnamed male	Dallas, Texas	Officers attempted to stop a vehicle matching the description of one involved in a recent burglary. The van led officers on a chase, then crashed. Two suspects were arrested and a third fled on foot. An officer caught the suspect, who then violently resisted arrest. The officer fatally shot the suspect, "fearing for his life."
2012-04-12	Wyatt, Rudolph	New York, New York	Wyatt committed an armed robbery of a pharmacy. Police responded and shot at Wyatt as he fled. A retired and armed NYPD officer heard the shots and fired three times at Wyatt, hitting him twice in the head.
2012-04-12	Hamlan, Abdul	Las Vegas, Nevada	Police were called to a home because of a suicidal man with a gun. They arrived to find Hamlan in the garage, who was crying and reportedly told officers, "just go ahead and shoot me, then." Hamlan was shot to death after refusing to drop his weapon.
2012-04-12	Robinson, Tamar	New York, New York	Officers spotted Robinson trying to load stolen paving stones into his vehicle. As he fled, he was struck and killed by a marked squad car.
2012-04-12	unnamed male	Brooklyn, Ohio	Police reported the deaths at a restaurant of a woman, a girl and a male suspect. The suspect was shot by police.
2012-04-12	unnamed male	Temple, Pennsylvania	A man drove unto a sidewalk and struck a pedestrian, then struck at least two other vehicles. Officers on the scene shot at the vehicle, flattening its tires. The man fled on foot, then threatened to shoot an officer. That officer shot the man twice, who was pronounced dead at a local hospital.
2012-04-11	Arian, Abdul (19)	Los Angeles, California	Arian was killed when LAPD officers fired over 90 rounds at him following a chase. Officers' attempts to pull Arian over for erratic driving resulted in a lengthy pursuit on the 101 freeway, during which Arian called 911 and made threatening comments. Police eventually rammed into his car, and Arian attempted to run before officers shot him to death. He was unarmed.
2012-04-11	Soto, Mario (41)	San Antonio, Texas	Plainclothes officers approached Soto as the prime suspect in recent armed robberies. Soto pulled a handgun from his waistband and shot at least once. Officers returned fire, killing him.
2012‑04‑10	Andrews, Ronald (51)	Birch Tree, MO	Officer was transporting Andrews to Howell County Jail when Andrews caused the car to veer off the road on Highway 60. There was a struggle inside the car and the officer shot and killed Andrews.
2012-04-10	Weldon, James	Burkeville, Texas	Officers responded to a report from neighbors' that Weldon told them to "get out of the area" because he had "bombs and booby traps." When the officers made contact with Weldon, he "drew weapons," prompting the officers to fatally shoot him.
2012-04-09	Bailey, Michael Anthony (26)	Landover, Maryland	An officer, on a routine patrol of an area known for narcotics activity, encountered Bailey. He fled and resisted efforts to subdue him with a Taser. When Bailey reached for a handgun in his waistband, the officer fatally shot him.
2012-04-08	Anderson, Marland (39)	Los Angeles, California	Anderson's girlfriend called police when he threatened to kill himself with a knife. Anderson left peacefully with police, but allegedly became violent and resisted officers while in an ambulance. Officers tased him twice and physically restrained him. He was placed in ICU upon arrival at the hospital, and died when he was taken off the respirator 5 days later. The coroner listed the cause of death as neck trauma, saying police must have compressed his neck in a choke hold or some other method of restraint, causing loss of blood to the brain.
2012-04-07	Musto, Douglas S. (27)	Westfield, Massachusetts	Police received a domestic disturbance call when Musto reportedly tried to kick down his ex-girlfriend's door. Officers shot him to death after he allegedly stabbed an officer who was trying to handcuff him.
2012-04-05	Bradley, Ahmede Jabbar (35)	Austin, Texas	Officer Eric Copeland pulled over Bradley's vehicle for playing music too loudly when he believed he smelled marijuana and prepared to search the vehicle. Bradley fled in his car and then on foot, where a series of struggles ensued and police say Bradley attempted to strangle the officer with his radio cord. Officer Copeland shot Bradley three times in the chest, killing him.
2012-04-04	Chevalier, Michael	Las Vegas, Nevada	Police responded to a home where Chevalier was assaulting a woman and had taken her hostage. Chevalier, armed with a gun, shot at officers and threatened to kill himself and the woman. A SWAT team stormed the home and an officer shot and killed Chevalier.
2012-04-04	May, Andrew Jr (30)	Joliet, Illinois	An officer on duty in a squad car struck and killed May as he reportedly walked 4 to 5 feet from the shoulder in the road.
2012-04-04	Miller, Gregory Clark (52)	San Antonio, Texas	Officers responded to report of a family disturbance. Miller advanced towards the officers swinging a machete. Miller was shot once in the chest and died at the scene.
2012-04-03	Sutton, Bobby Dale	Tulsa, Oklahoma	Shot after attacking officers with a knife.
2012-04-01	Lanning, Troy, Jr. (24)	Wichita, Kansas	Officers were looking for a white vehicle after receiving a report of a drive-by shooting. They spotted a white car speeding and attempted a traffic stop, and a 7-minute chase ensued. The vehicle was disabled after driving over a curb, and four people fled on foot. One officer chased Lanning over a fence into a backyard. Lanning was carrying a bag and allegedly reaching into it and the officer shot him several times, killing him. No weapons were found in Lanning's belongings or in the vehicle.

== See also ==
- Death in custody § United States
- Henry A. Wallace Police Crime Public Database
- List of cases of police brutality
- List of countries with annual rates and counts for killings by law enforcement officers
- List of law enforcement officers killed in the line of duty in the United States
- List of law enforcement officers convicted for an on-duty killing in the United States
- List of police reforms related to the George Floyd protests
- List of unarmed African Americans killed by law enforcement officers in the United States
- Lists of killings by law enforcement officers
- Police brutality in the United States
- Police misconduct § United States
- Police riot § United States
- Police use of deadly force in the United States
