= Sayre Yard =

Coordinates: 41.990626°N 76.519150°W

Lehigh Valley Railroad
- LV system map

Overview
- Headquarters: New York City, New York
- Reporting mark: LV
- Locale: New Jersey; Pennsylvania; New York
- Dates of operation: 1846–1976
- Successor: Conrail

Technical
- Track gauge: 4 ft 8 1/2 in (1,435 mm) standard gauge
- Length: 1,362 miles (2,192 kilometres)

Historic Sayre Yard, named after the chief engineer and first superintendent of the Lehigh Valley Railroad (LV), was established across the state line in 1876 in Waverly, New York and Sayre, Pennsylvania. The large yard, and the purpose built company town, Sayre, Pennsylvania were founded as part of a planned program of expansion and extension to the young railroad's infrastructure—the yard was but one benchmark on the way to completing the goal of establishing competitive passenger rail service between New York City, as well as cities in Delaware such as Wilmington, cities in central New Jersey such as Trenton, and Eastern Pennsylvania cities including Philadelphia with Chicago and other Great Lakes Cities via Buffalo, New York.

The Lehigh Valley was primarily first and foremost a coal road which transported high grade Anthracite to the big cities of the east and to steel mills along the Great Lakes and to the area in and around Chicago. The yard is a way point along the historic rail corridor that extends along the left bank Susquehanna River through the RBMN Duryea Yard and Mountain Top Yards down along the route of the historic Lehigh Canal and across the Delaware at Easton, Pennsylvania.

== History ==
Until the dismantlement under Conrail, the yard engine maintenance building had the largest structure in the United States devoted to the maintenance and construction of railroad locomotives.

The yard was acquired by Norfolk Southern Railroad in 1996 from the dissolution of Conrail which had acquired the property in 1976 when the Lehigh Valley Railroad joined its properties to that ill-fated conglomerate enterprise.
