= Rail yard =

Enclosed area designated for railways

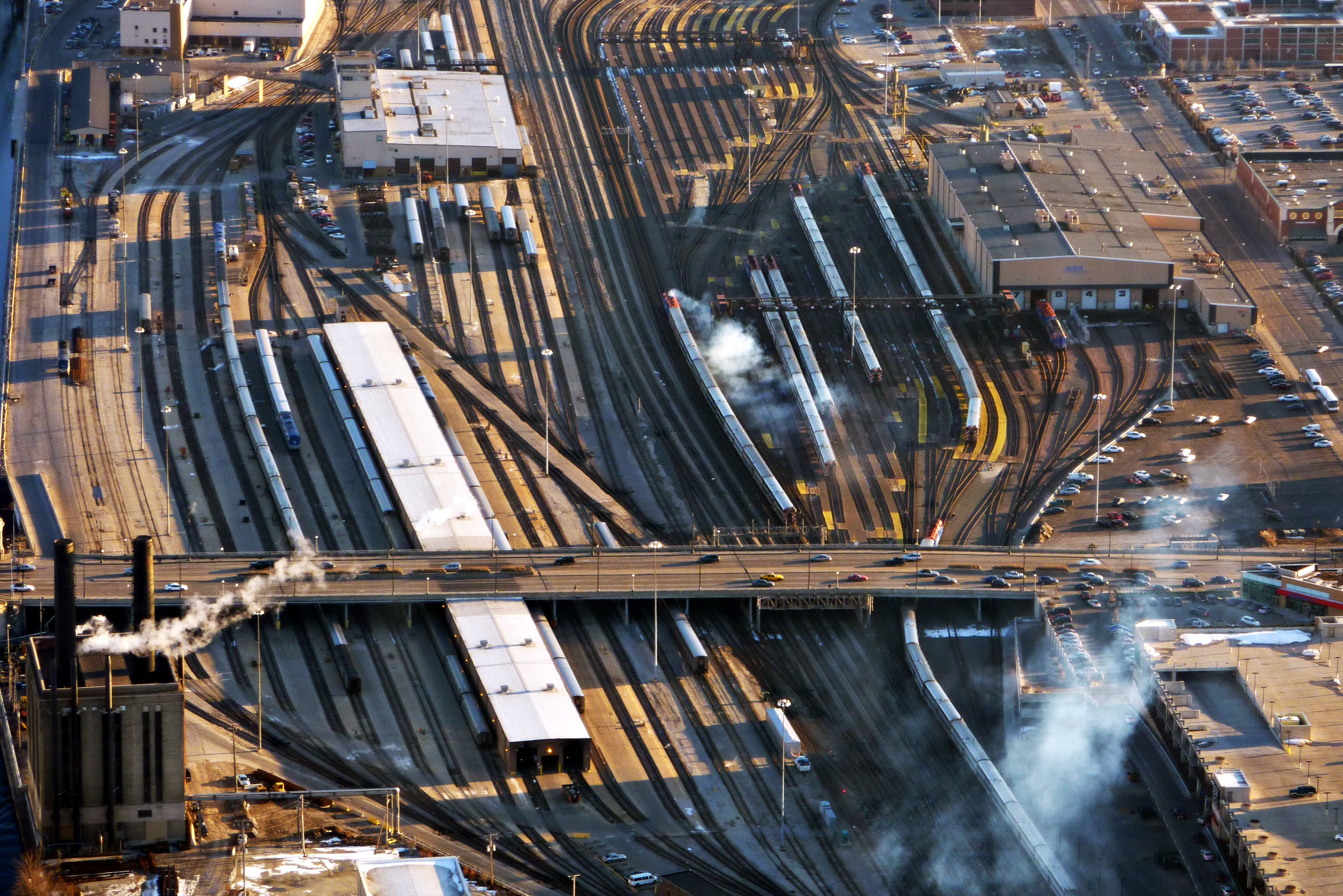
A large Amtrak and Metra coach yard just south of Chicago Union Station. About 25 percent of all rail traffic in the United States travels through the Chicago area.

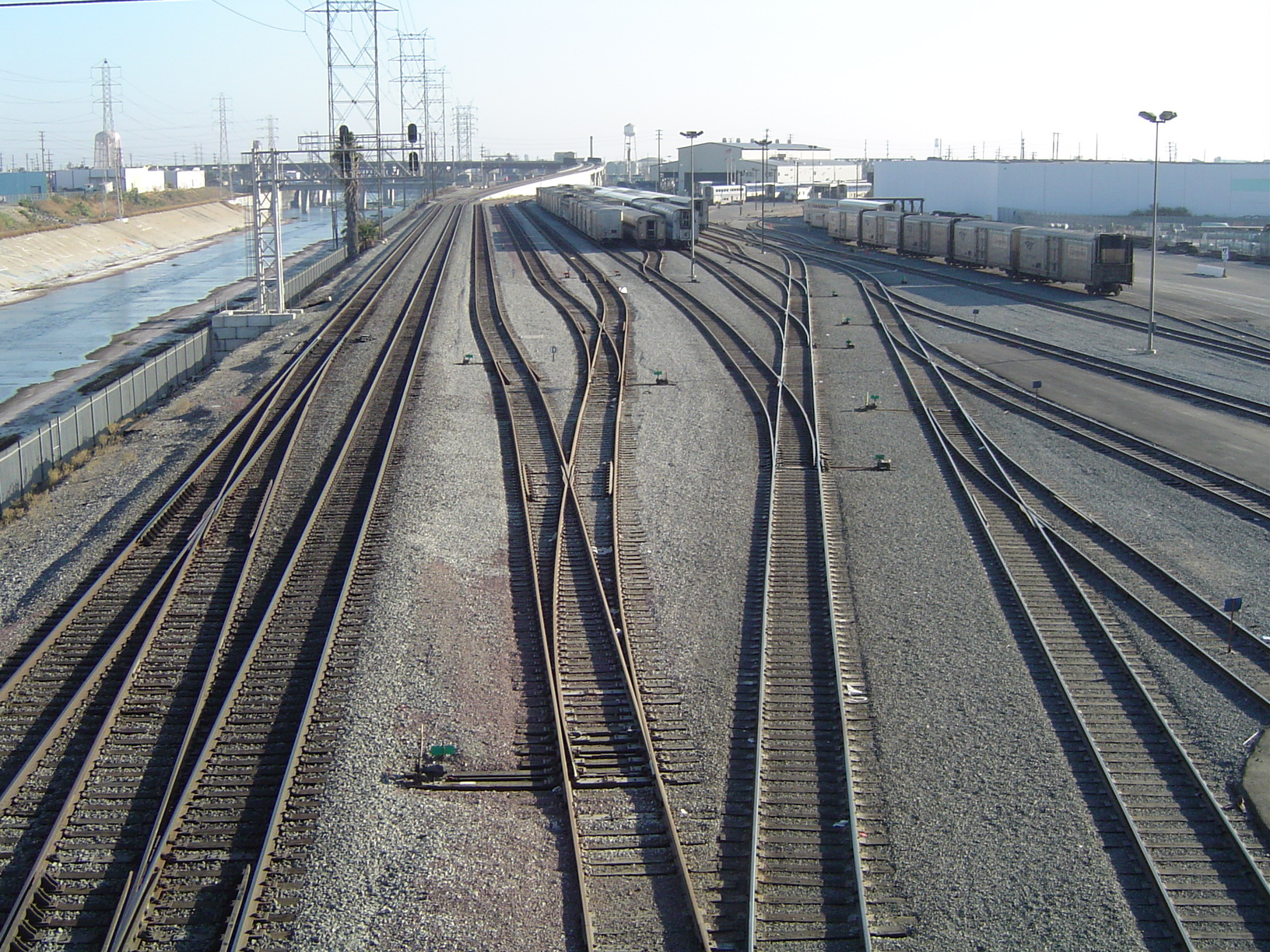
Yard for Amtrak equipment, located next to the Los Angeles River. The two tracks on the left are the mainline.

A rail yard, railway yard, railroad yard (US) or simply yard, is a series of tracks in a rail network for storing, sorting, or loading and unloading rail vehicles and locomotives. Yards have many tracks in parallel for storing rolling stock or unused locomotives off the main line, so they do not obstruct traffic flow. Cars or wagons are moved around by specially designed yard switcher locomotives (US) or shunter locomotives (UK), a type of locomotive. Cars or wagons in a yard may be sorted by numerous categories, including railway company, loaded or unloaded status, destination, car type, or need for repairs. Yards are normally built where there is a need to store rail vehicles while they are not being loaded or unloaded, or are waiting to be assembled into trains. Large yards may have a tower to control operations.

Many yards are located at strategic points on a main line. Mainline yards are often composed of an up yard and a down yard, linked to the associated direction of travel. There are different types of yards, and different parts within a yard, depending on how they are built.

== Freight yards ==
For freight cars, the overall yard layout is typically designed around a principal switching (US term) or shunting (UK) technique:

- A flat yard has no hump and relies on locomotives for all car movements.
- A gravity yard is built on a natural slope and relies less on locomotives; generally, locomotives will control a consist being sorted from uphill of the cars about to be sorted. They are decoupled and allowed to accelerate into the classification equipment lower down.
- A hump yard has a constructed hill, over which yard locomotives shove freight cars, and then are propelled by gravity to various sorting tracks.

=== Sorting yard basics ===
In the case of all classification or sorting yards, human intelligence plays a primary role in setting a strategy for the switching operations; the fewer times coupling operations need to be made, and the less distance traveled, the faster the operation, the better the strategy, and the sooner the newly configured consist can be joined to its outbound train.

- Switching yards, staging yards, or shunting yards are typically graded to be flat yards, where switch engines manually shuffle and maneuver cars from (a) train arrival tracks, to (b) a consist breakdown track, to (c) a consist assembly track, thence to (d) departure tracks of the yard.
  - A large subgroup of such yards is known as staging yards, which serve as end destinations and collection yards, starting car groups for departure. These seemingly incompatible tasks arise because the operating or road company and its locomotive drop off empties and pick up full cars waiting for departure, which have been spotted and assembled by local switch engines. The long-haul carrier makes the round trip with minimal turnaround time, and the local switch engine transfers empties to the loading yard when the industry's output is ready for shipment.
  - This activity is duplicated in a transfer yard, the difference being that in the latter, several industrial customers are serviced by the local switcher, which is part of the yard equipment, and the industry pays a cargo transfer fee to the railroad or yard operating company. In the staging yard, the locomotive is most likely operated by industry personnel (refinery, chemical company, or coal mine), and, in both cases, ownership of the yard is a matter of business and could be any imaginable combination. Ownership and operation are quite often a matter of leases and interests. (Note: The Lehigh and Susquehanna Railroad was builder and operator of Mountain Top Yard, whereas both were leased to the CNJ, rents and ownership being retained by the Lehigh Coal & Navigation Company.)

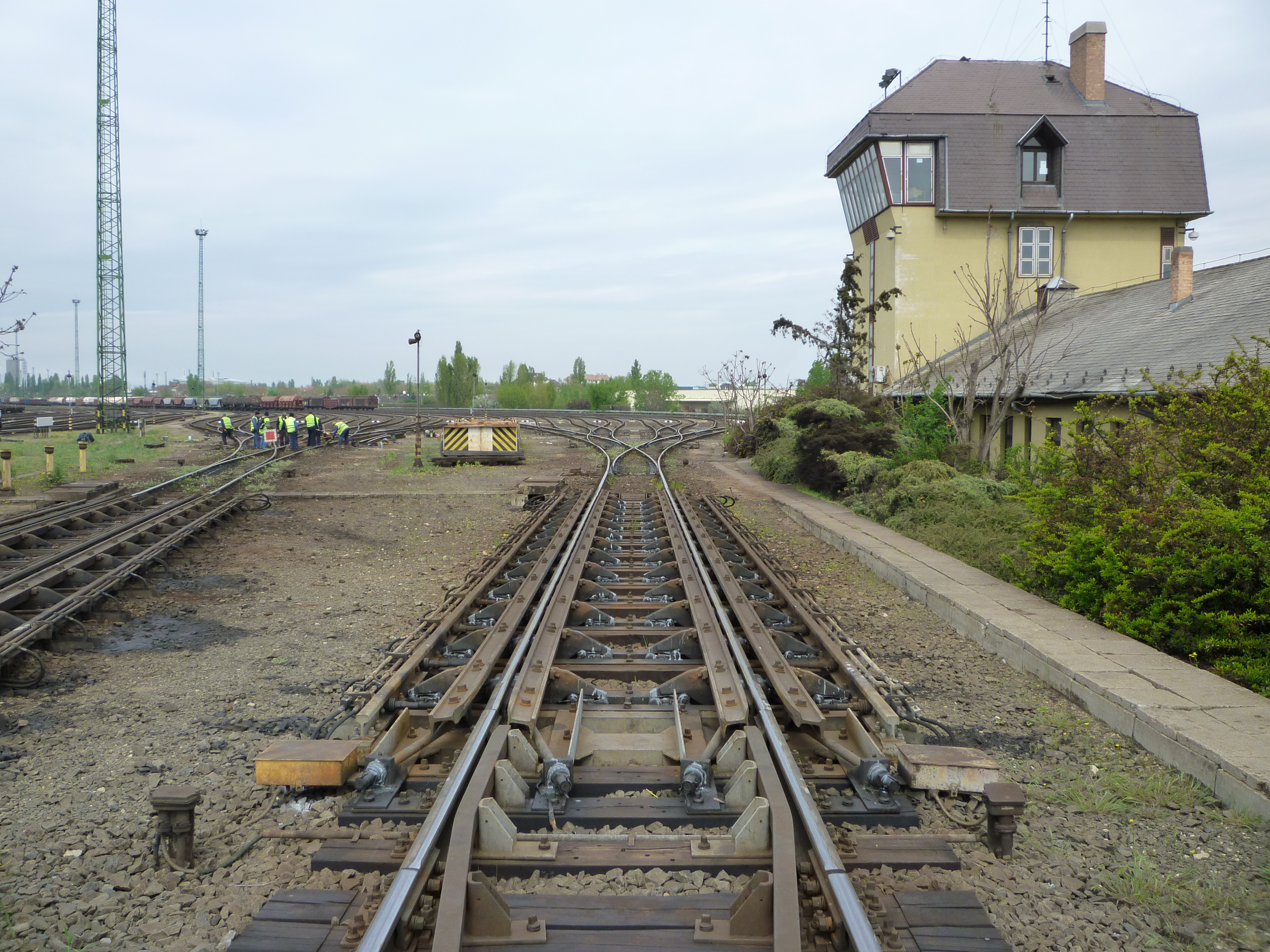
The "hump" of a hump yard. Railcars travel past retarders, which control their speed, and are directed onto tracks to be assembled into new trains. The control tower operates the retarders.

- Hump yards and gravity yards are usually highly automated and designed for the efficient breakdown, sorting, and recombining of freight into consists, so they are equipped with mechanical retarders (external brakes) and scales that a computer or operator uses along with knowledge of the gradient of the hump to calculate and control the speed of the cars as they roll downhill to their destination tracks. These modern sorting and classification systems are sophisticated enough to allow a first car to roll to a stop near the end of its classification track, and, by slowing the speed of subsequent cars down the hump, shorten the distance for the following series of cars so they can bump and couple gently, without damaging one another. Since overall throughput speed matters, many have small pneumatic, hydraulic, or spring-driven braking retarders (below, right) to adjust and slow speed both before and after yard switch points. Along with car and load tracking to the destination, technologies such as RFID enable long trains to be broken down and reconfigured at transfer yards or in operations in a remarkably short time.

== Nomenclature and components ==
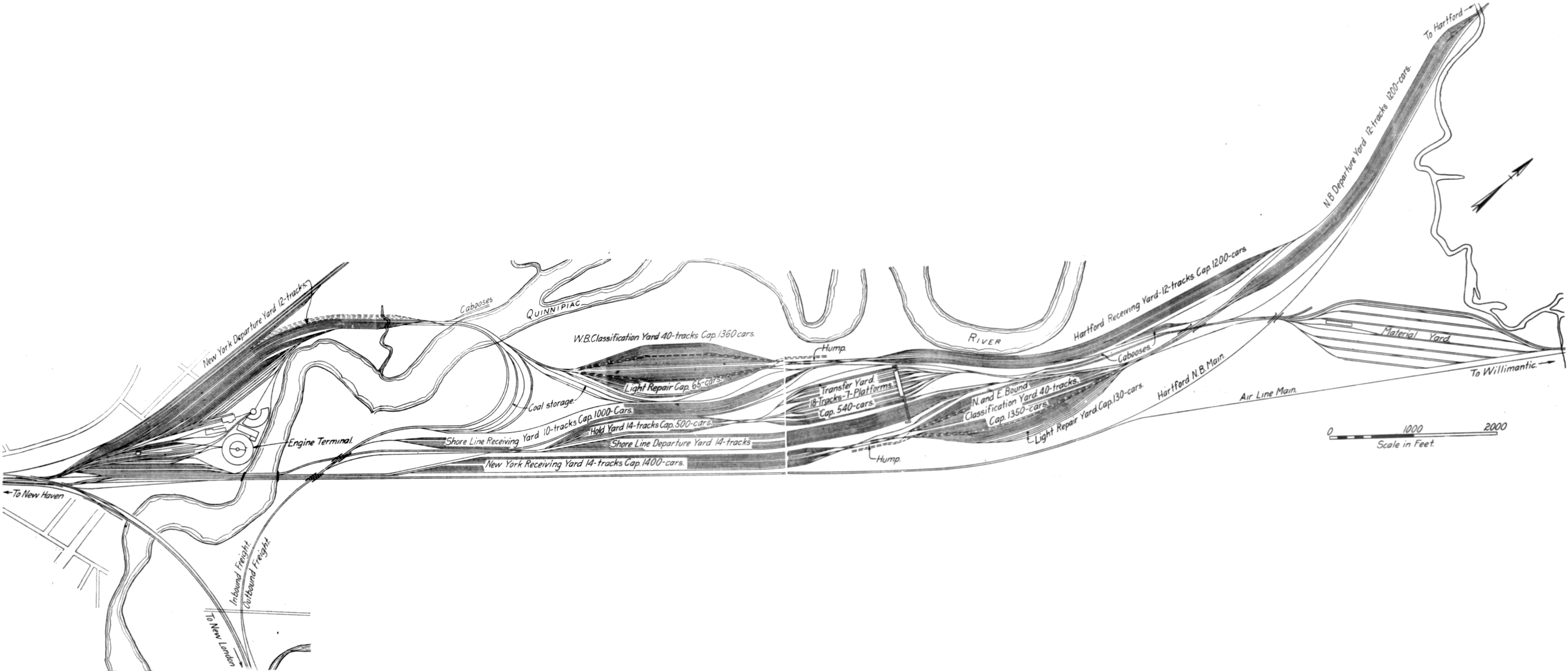
This map of Cedar Hill Yard in Connecticut shows a variety of different facilities, including receiving yards, departure yards, classification yards, and a repair yard.

A large freight yard may include the following components:

- Receiving yard, also called an arrival yard, where freight cars or wagons are detached from their locomotives, inspected for mechanical problems, and sent to a classification or marshaling yard.
- Switching yards, switchyards, shunting yards, or sorting yards—yards where cars are sorted for various destinations and assembled into blocks have different formal names in different cultural traditions:
  - Classification yard (US and by Canadian National Railway in Canada) or
  - Marshalling yard (UK and Canadian Pacific Railway in Canada)
- Departure yard, where car blocks are assembled into trains.
- Car repair yard, or maintenance yard, for freight cars.
- Engine house (in some yards, a roundhouse), to fuel and service locomotives.
- Transfer yard, a yard where consists are dropped off or picked up as a group by through service such as a unit train, but managed locally by local switching service locomotives.
- Unit tracks may be reserved for unit trains, which carry a block of cars all of the same origin and destination, so that through traffic does not get sorted in a classification yard. Such consists often stop in a freight yard for other purposes: inspection, engine servicing, being switched into a longer consist, or crew changes.

Freight yards may have multiple industries adjacent to them where railroad cars are loaded or unloaded and then stored before they move on to their new destination.

== Coach yards ==
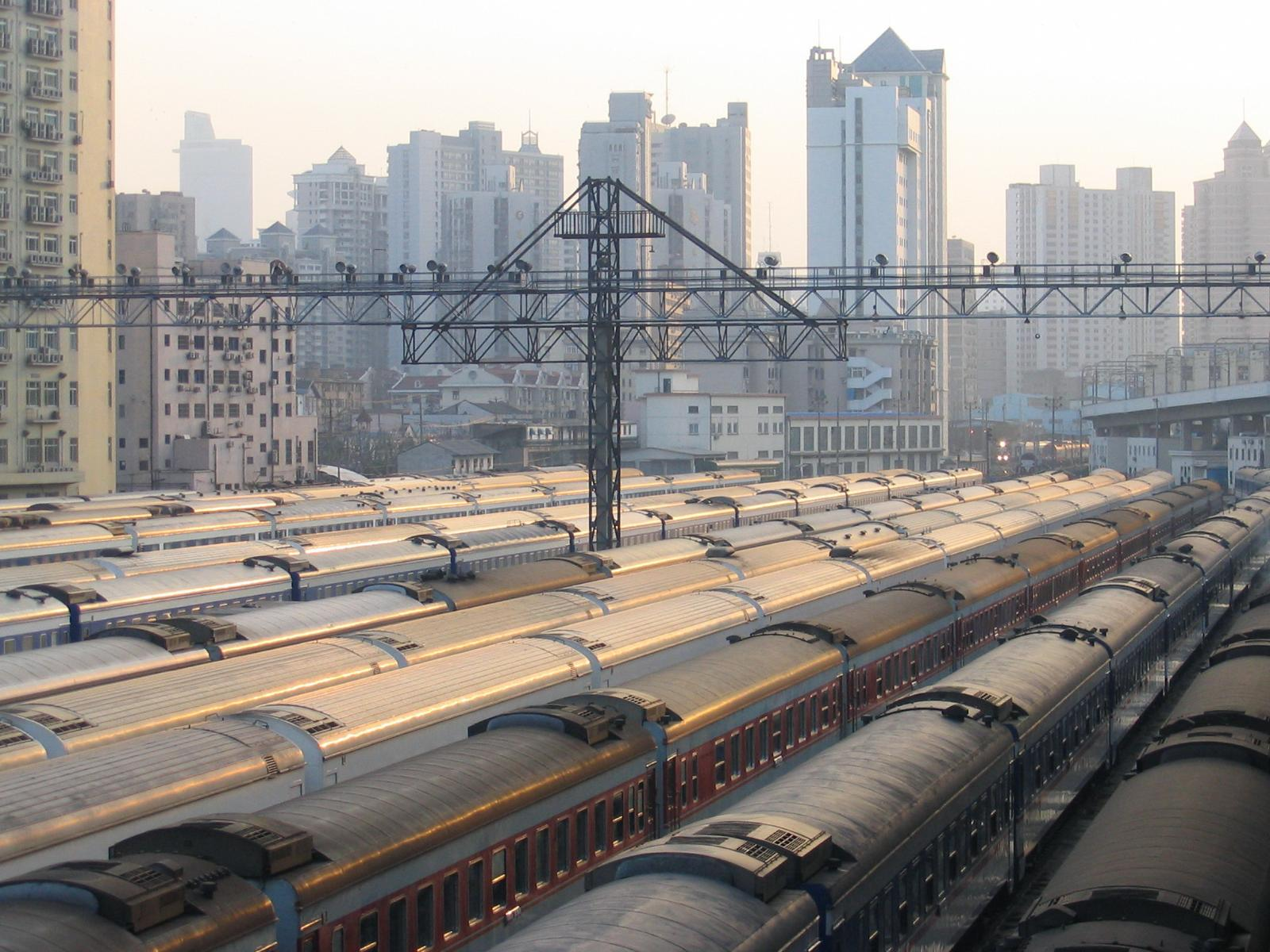
A coach yard in Shanghai, China

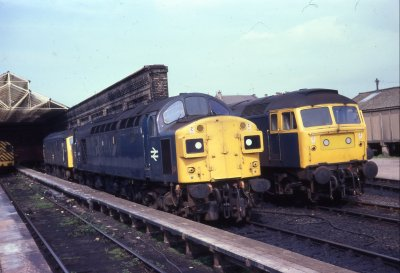
Workington stabling point in 1981, with locomotives from Classes 25, 40 and 47 parked between duties.

Coach yards (American English) or stabling yards or carriage sidings (British English) are used for sorting, storing, and repairing passenger cars. These yards are located in metropolitan areas near large stations or terminals. An example of a major US coach yard is Sunnyside Yard in New York City, operated by Amtrak. Those that are principally used for storage, such as the West Side Yard in New York, are called "layup yards" or "stabling yards." Coach yards are commonly flat yards because unladen passenger coaches are heavier than unladen freight carriages.

In the UK, a stabling point is a place where rail locomotives are parked while awaiting their next turn of duty. A stabling point may be fitted with a fuelling point and other minor maintenance facilities. A good example of this was Newport's Godfrey Road stabling point, which has since been closed. Stabling sidings can range from just a few roads to large complexes like Feltham Sidings. They are sometimes electrified with a third rail or OLE. An example of a stabling point with third rail would be Feltham marshalling yard which is being made into carriage sidings for the British Rail Class 701 EMU.

== See also ==
- Classification yard
- Goods station
- List of rail yards
- List of railway roundhouses
- Rail transport operations
- Siding (rail)
- Traction maintenance depot
