= Port Clinton, Pennsylvania =

Borough in Pennsylvania, US

- Borough
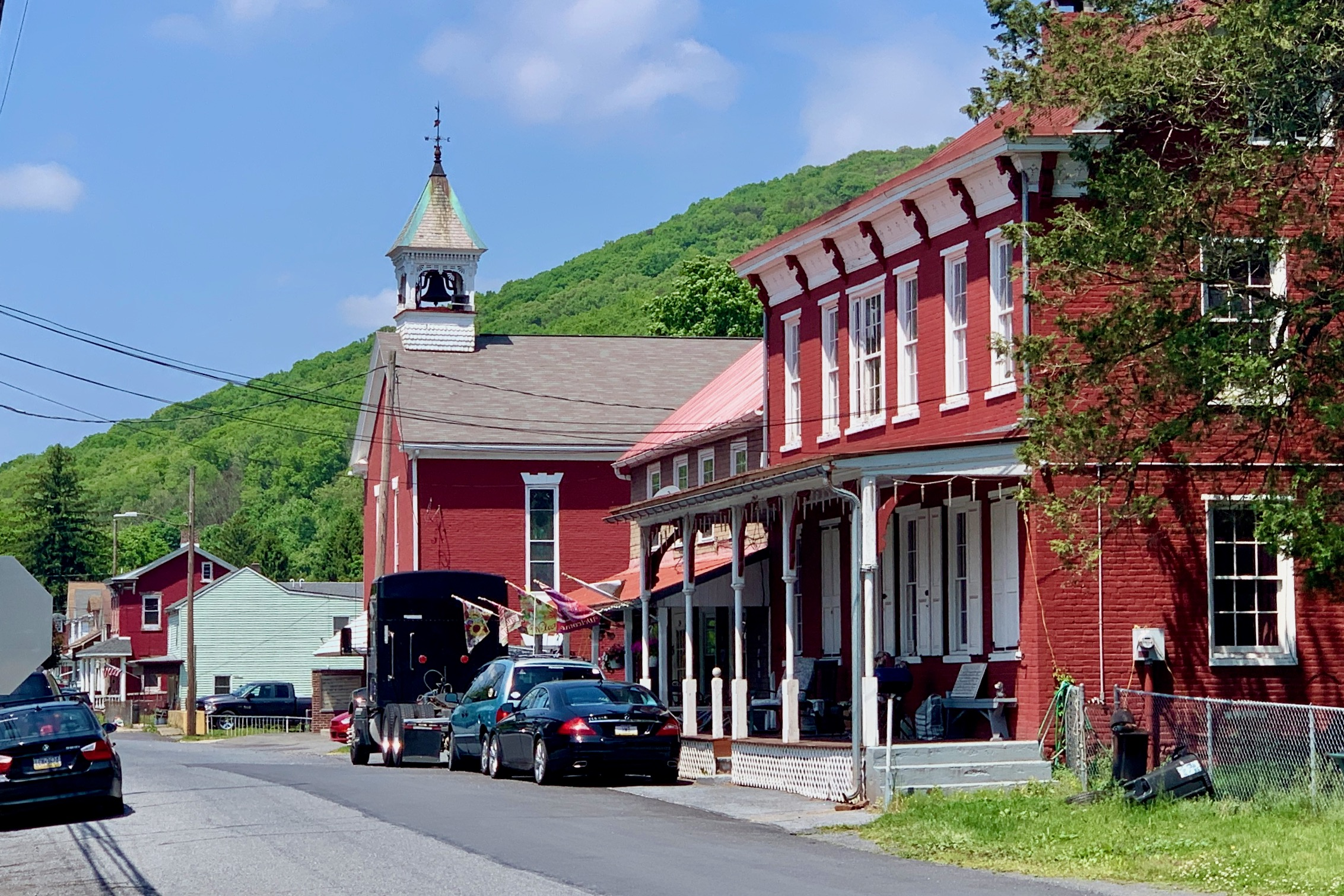
- St. John's Church on Penn Street in Port Clinton

- Location of Port Clinton in Schuylkill County, Pennsylvania (left) and of Schuylkill County in Pennsylvania (right)

- Location of Port Clinton in Pennsylvania Port Clinton (the United States)
- Coordinates: 40°34′56″N 76°01′28″W
- Country: United States
- State: Pennsylvania
- County: Schuylkill
- Settled: 1829
- Incorporated: 1850
- Named for: DeWitt Clinton

Government
  - Type: Borough Council

Area
  - Total: 0.77 sq mi (1.99 km^{2})
  - Land: 0.76 sq mi (1.97 km^{2})
  - Water: 0.0039 sq mi (0.01 km^{2})

Population (2020)
  - Total: 278
  - Density: 365.0/sq mi (140.94/km^{2})
- Time zone: UTC-5 (Eastern (EST))
  - Summer (DST): UTC-4 (EDT)
- ZIP Code: 19549
- Area code: 610
- FIPS code: 42-62136
- Website: https://portclintonpa.com/

Port Clinton is a borough in Schuylkill County, Pennsylvania. As of the 2020 census, Port Clinton had a population of 278. It is located at the confluence of the Schuylkill and Little Schuylkill rivers, it was a port on the Schuylkill Canal and named after DeWitt Clinton.

== Demographics ==
Historical population
Census	Pop.	Note	%±
1850	374		—
1860	586		56.7%
1870	578		−1.4%
1880	686		18.7%
1890	606		−11.7%
1900	478		−21.1%
1910	491		2.7%
1920	474		−3.5%
1930	406		−14.3%
1940	407		0.2%
1950	451		10.8%
1960	739		63.9%
1970	363		−50.9%
1980	337		−7.2%
1990	328		−2.7%
2000	288		−12.2%
2010	326		13.2%
2020	278		−14.7%
2021 (est.)	281	▲	1.1%

As of the 2000 census, there were 288 people, 132 households, and 81 families residing in the borough. The population density was 577.4 inhabitants per square mile (222.9/km^{2}). There were 139 housing units at an average density of 278.7 per square mile (107.6/km^{2}). The racial makeup of the borough was 98.26% White, 0.35% Native American, 0.35% from other races, and 1.04% from two or more races. Hispanic or Latino of any race were 2.78% of the population.

There were 132 households, out of which 19.7% had children under the age of 18 living with them, 47.0% were married couples living together, 6.8% had a female householder with no husband present, and 38.6% were non-families. 32.6% of all households were made up of individuals, and 11.4% had someone living alone who was 65 years of age or older. The average household size was 2.18 and the average family size was 2.80.

In the borough the population was spread out, with 16.7% under the age of 18, 4.9% from 18 to 24, 30.6% from 25 to 44, 30.9% from 45 to 64, and 17.0% who were 65 years of age or older. The median age was 44 years. For every 100 females there were 110.2 males. For every 100 females age 18 and over, there were 96.7 males.

The median income for a household in the borough was $28,333, and the median income for a family was $36,071. Males had a median income of $30,795 versus $20,000 for females. The per capita income for the borough was $15,395. About 3.7% of families and 7.0% of the population were below the poverty line, including 15.0% of those under the age of eighteen and 2.0% of those 65 or over.

== Geography ==
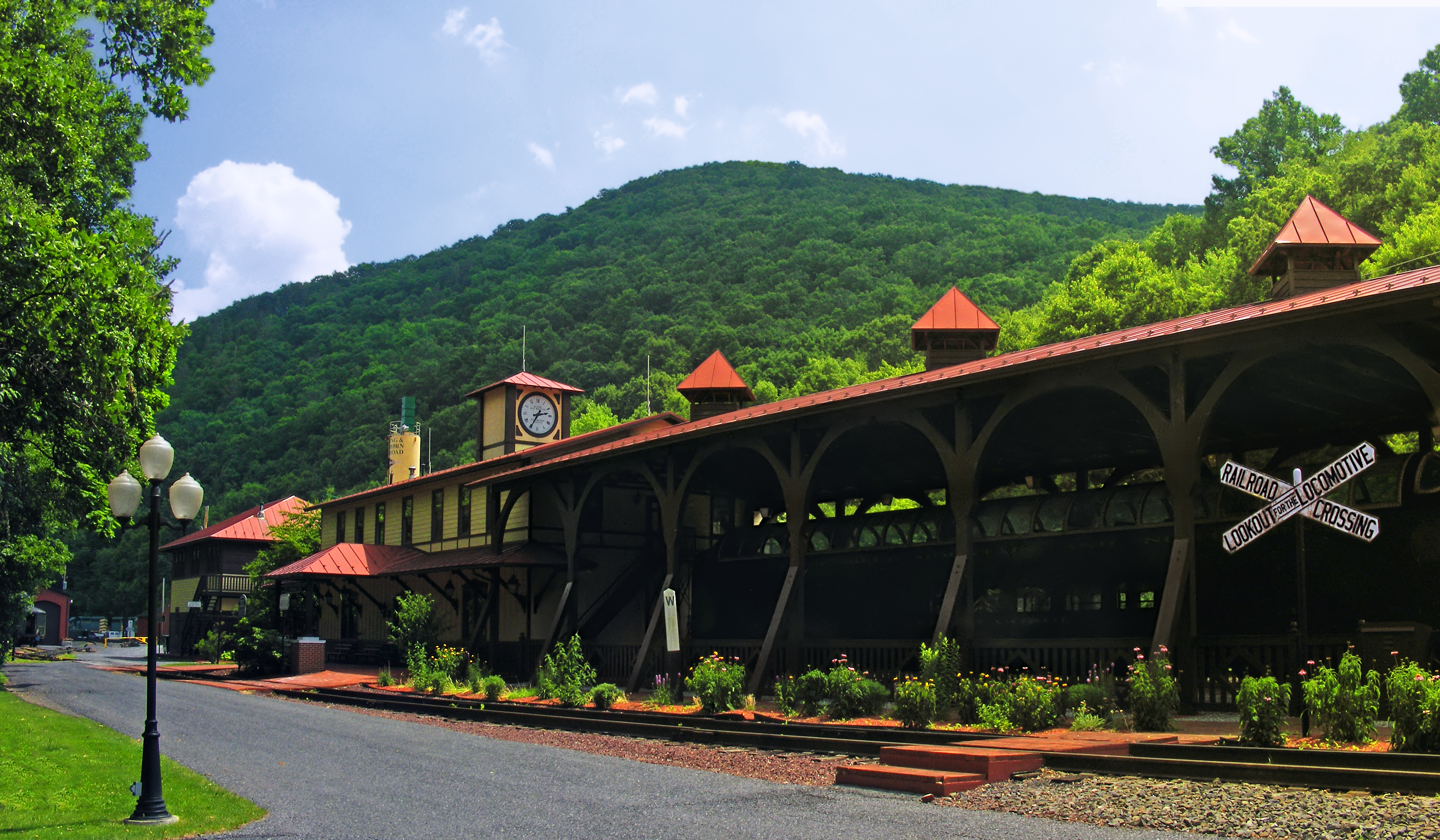
The Reading Blue Mountain and Northern Railroad depot in Port Clinton

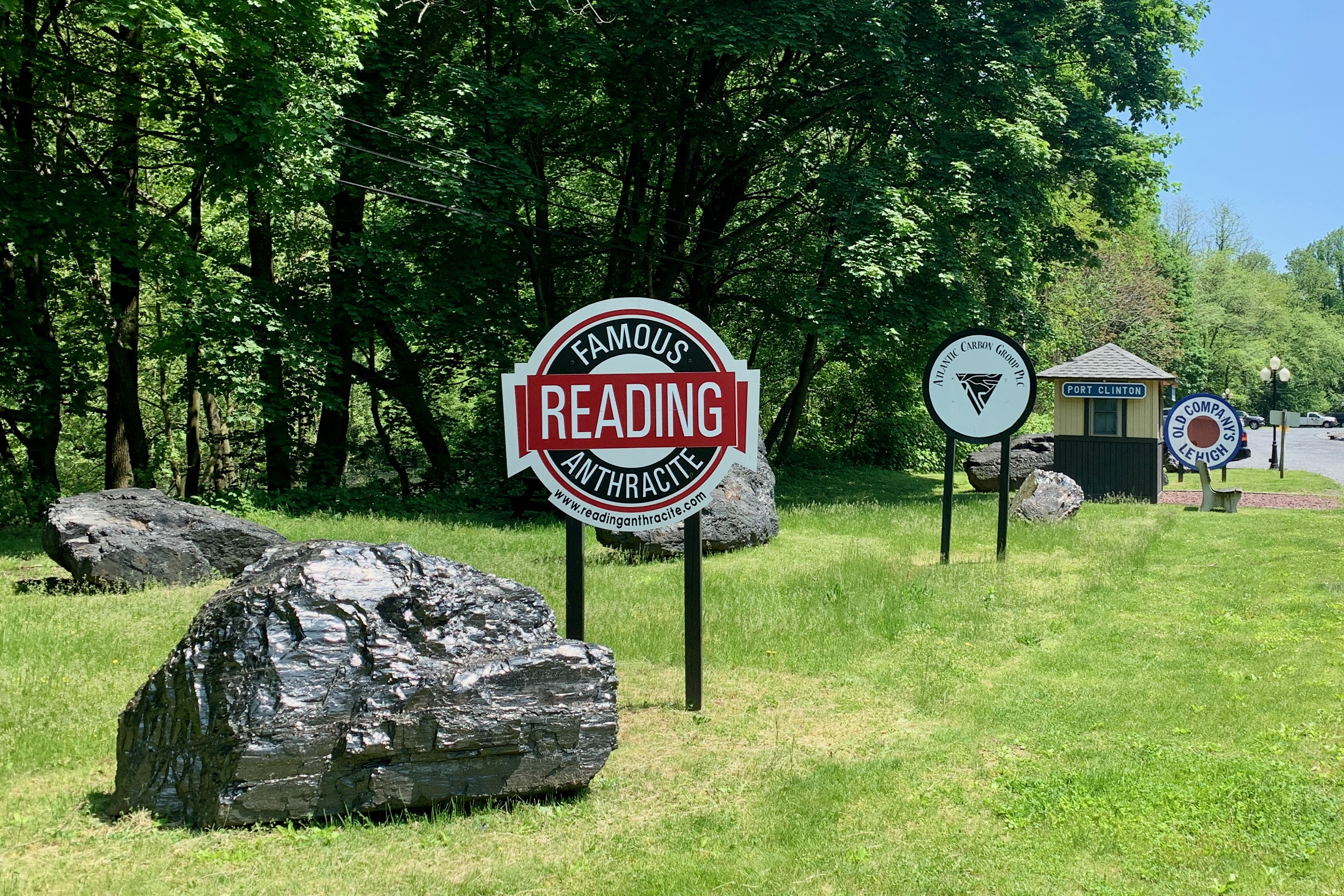
Port Clinton station entrance signs by an anthracite coal boulder

According to the U.S. Census Bureau, the borough has a total area of 0.5 square miles (1.3 km^{2}), all land.

== Transportation ==
The Reading Blue Mountain and Northern Railroad has its headquarters in Port Clinton.

== Point of interest ==
The Appalachian Trail passes through Port Clinton as it crosses the Schuylkill River, along Blue Mountain.
