= Reading Blue Mountain and Northern Railroad =

Class II railroad in eastern Pennsylvania

- Map of Reading Blue Mountain and Northern Railroad's routes and tracks in the Lehigh Valley and Northeastern Pennsylvania

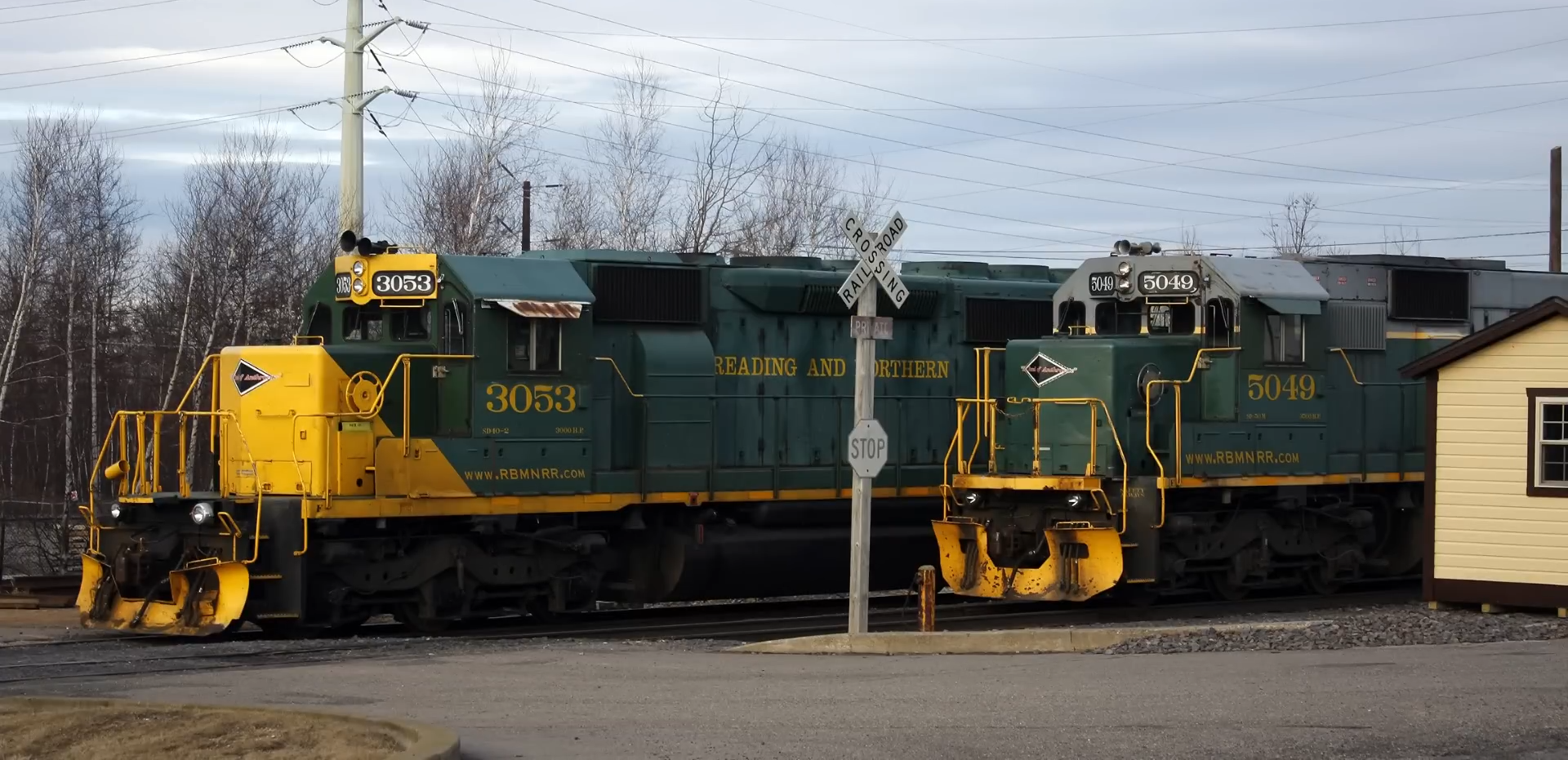
- Reading and Northern SD40-2 #3053 and SD50 #5049 parked next to each other at Hazelton, Pennsylvania in 2004

Overview
- Headquarters: Port Clinton, Pennsylvania, U.S.
- Reporting mark: RBMN
- Locale: Lehigh Valley and Northeastern Pennsylvania, Pennsylvania, U.S.
- Dates of operation: 1983–present
- Predecessor: Conrail

Technical
- Track gauge: 4 ft 8 1/2 in (1,435 mm) standard gauge
- Length: 400 miles (640 km)

Other
- Website: www.rbmnrr.com

The Reading Blue Mountain and Northern Railroad (reporting mark RBMN), sometimes shortened to Reading and Northern Railroad, is a regional railroad in eastern Pennsylvania. With a headquarters in Port Clinton, the RBMN provides freight service on over 400 miles (640 km) of track. Its mainline consists of the Reading Division between Reading and Packerton and the Lehigh Division between Lehighton and Dupont. This mainline gives the RBMN a direct route from Reading to Scranton, the first such route to exist under the control of a single railroad. Founded in 1983 to take over from Conrail on the ex-Pennsylvania Railroad Schuylkill Branch between Reading and Hamburg, the railroad quickly grew over the next several decades to become the largest privately owned Class II railroad in the United States. Its main freight cargo is anthracite coal, but also sees significant shipments in frac sand, forest products, petrochemicals and minerals, food and agricultural products, metals, and consumer products.

The Reading and Northern is also well known for operating several passenger excursions over its system. A subsidiary, the Lehigh Gorge Scenic Railway (LGSR), offers daily service between Jim Thorpe and Lehigh Gorge State Park between the months of April and November, while RBMN itself runs regular weekend trains to Jim Thorpe from Reading and Pittston. In 2022, the RBMN also revived the Reading Company Iron Horse Rambles, using recently restored locomotive RDG 2102.

== Main lines ==
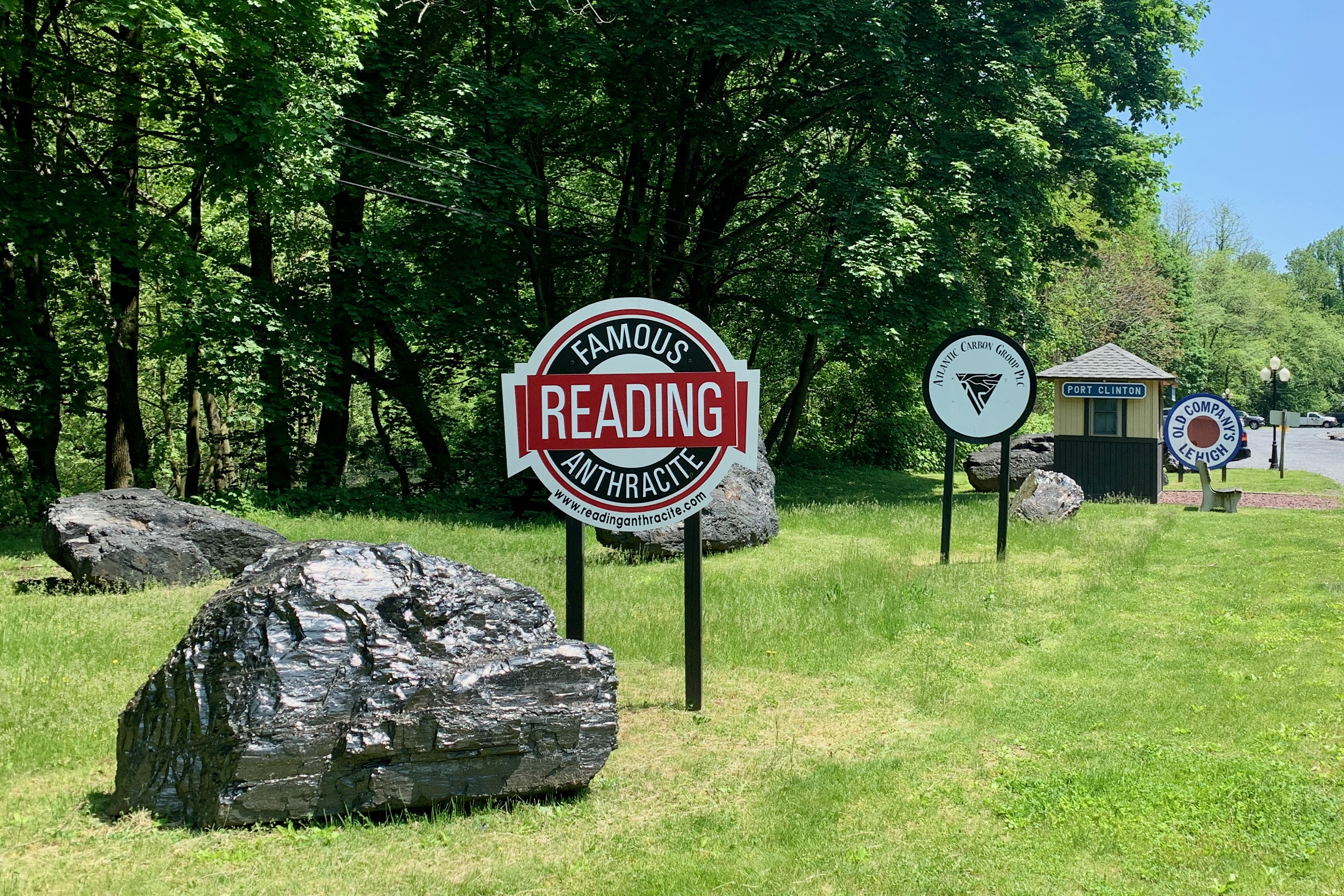
The Port Clinton station entrance in Port Clinton in Schuylkill County, Pennsylvania

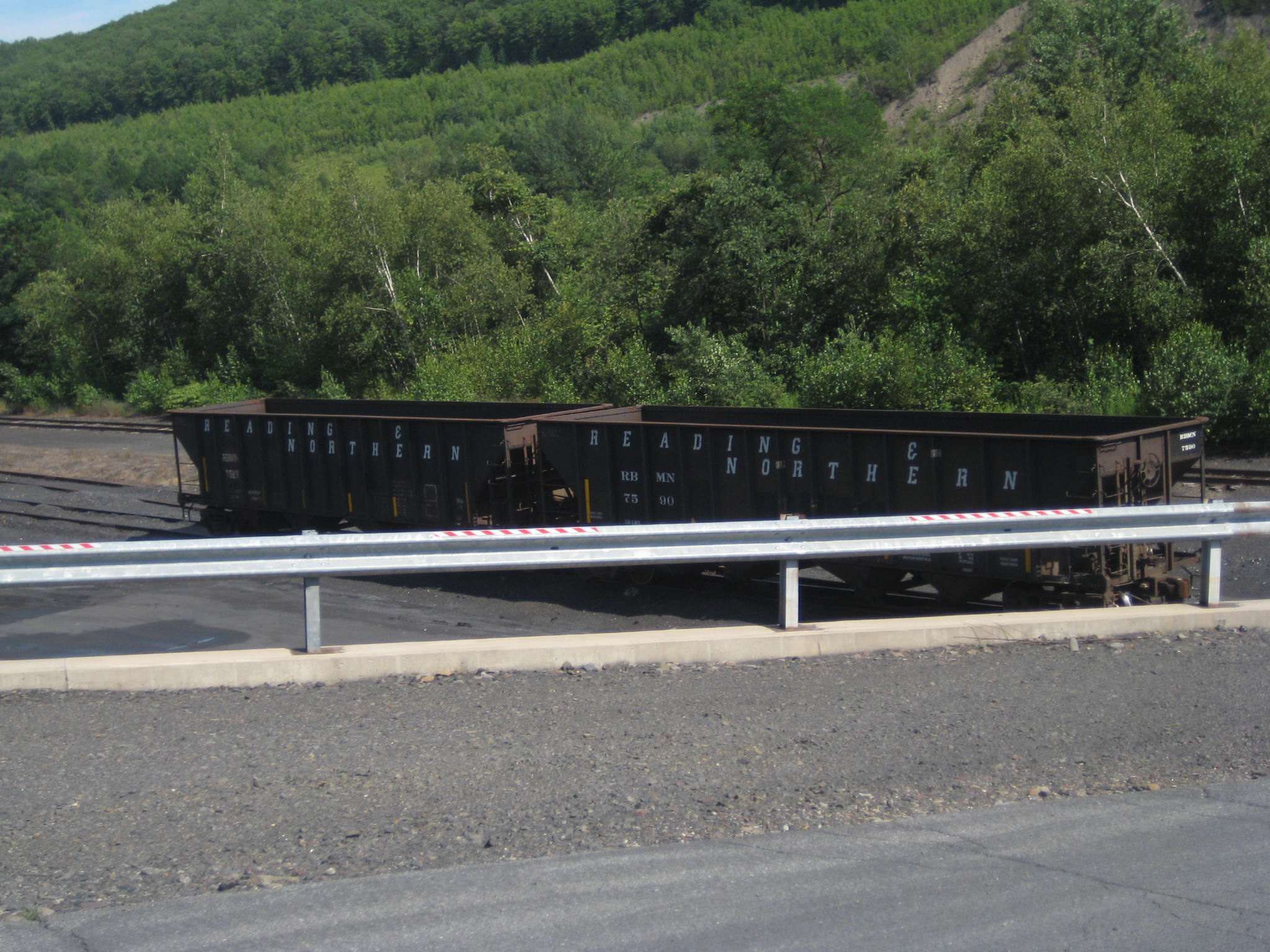
Reading and Northern (RBMN) hopper cars loaded with anthracite in the trainyard of Blaschak Coal Company in Mahanoy City, Pennsylvania

RBMN's two main lines all operate entirely within Pennsylvania:

- Reading Division: Reading to Packerton, along the Lehigh River:
  - The line runs from Reading to Packerton along former Reading Company and Central Railroad of New Jersey lines. At its south end, it connects to the Norfolk Southern Railway's Reading Line; its east end is at the Norfolk Southern's Lehigh Line which parallels the Reading and Northern's Lehigh Division.
- Lehigh Division: Lehighton to Dupont:
  - This line forms a fork from Jim Thorpe, one branch running westerly through Nesquehoning and connecting via a junction to Mahanoy City or Hazleton, and the second branch runs northerly via the Lehigh River Gorge, climbs to Mountain Top, with a double track running from there most of the way to Duryea Yard at Duryea, and Taylor Yard in Taylor, outside Scranton.

== History ==
=== Beginning ===
The Blue Mountain and Reading Railroad was founded in 1983 to provide freight service on the former Pennsylvania Railroad Schuylkill Division between Hamburg and Temple. Starting in 1985, the BM&R began operating passenger excursions over the line using two steam locomotives: ex-Gulf, Mobile and Northern Railroad 4-6-2 № 425 and ex-Reading Company T-1 4-8-4 № 2102. The BM&R also began operating three more state-owned lines: the Allentown branch, the Perkiomen Branch, and Colebrookdale branch. The railroad also entered into a partnership with the Reading Company Technical and Historical Society, which leased track space in Leesport and in return leased two vintage Reading Company diesel locomotives and assorted passenger cars for use on the line.

=== Expansion ===
In 1990, the Blue Mountain and Reading took ownership of 150 miles of track located in the Coal Region north of Reading, referred to by Conrail as the "Reading Cluster". Shortly thereafter, the company renamed itself the Reading Blue Mountain and Northern Railroad and moved its headquarters from Hamburg to Port Clinton. Throughout the 1990s and 2000s, the RBMN acquired more lines in northeastern Pennsylvania, primarily of Reading Railroad, Central Railroad of New Jersey, and Lehigh Valley Railroad heritage.

In the mid-1990s, the RBMN discontinued the regularly scheduled passenger operations between Hamburg and Temple and instead focused on occasional excursions throughout the rest of its system. The partnership between the RBMN and Reading Company Technical and Historical Society had more or less ended by this point, but the group still leased track space in Leesport until 2008 when they moved to the Hamburg yard and opened the Reading Railroad Heritage Museum.

Despite the discontinuation of the Hamburg to Temple excursions, steam operations continued elsewhere on the railroad. In 1995, No. 425 was present at the grand opening of Steamtown National Historic Site in Scranton. № 425 remained at Steamtown until 1997. Between 1998 and late 2008, all steam operations were suspended while both № 425 and № 2102 underwent full rebuilds in compliance with federal guidelines. № 425 returned to service in 2008, while № 2102 returned to service in 2022.

=== 21st century ===
In 2005, regularly scheduled passenger excursions resumed with the introduction of the Lehigh Gorge Scenic Railway in Jim Thorpe. In December 2016, the RBMN announced that it spent $2 million to build a train station at Pennsylvania Route 61 and Bellevue Avenue in Muhlenberg Township outside Reading, called Reading Outer Station, with plans to operate passenger excursions from there to Jim Thorpe. The first round-trip excursion from Reading Outer Station to Jim Thorpe ran on May 29, 2017. It used refurbished Rail Diesel Cars built by the Budd Company in the 1950s, which operated along the Pottsville Line between Pottsville and Philadelphia via Reading until SEPTA discontinued diesel service in 1981.

Between 2009 and 2010, RBMN expanded operations due to the emergence of Marcellus Shale natural gas drilling in northeastern Pennsylvania. The railroad spent $100,000 to update an outdated and lightly used Pittston Yard between Scranton and Wilkes-Barre. RBMN also purchased two new locomotives, 101 rail cars, and 6 miles (9.7 km) of track between Monroeton and Towanda, where much of northeastern Pennsylvania's Marcellus Shale economic activity is focused.

In 2017, the railroad completed its connections to the Hazleton Shaft and Hazleton Hiller Drying Plant.

In 2019, an audit by the borough of Jim Thorpe revealed the Lehigh Gorge Scenic Railway owed the borough $90,000 in amusement tax. The Railway fought the tax bill in court, where the judge sided with the borough; the railway appealed the decision, arguing that the tourist railroad was "not an amusement". Company officials threatened to leave the borough of Jim Thorpe, and briefly ceased excursion operations in November 2019. RBMN officials shortly thereafter, negotiated a new agreement with the Jim Thorpe Borough government, and excursions resumed in February 2020.

On May 6, 2021, railroad officials announced their purchase of the 19.5-mile (31.4 km) Panther Valley line from Carbon County for $4.7 million. This line, part of the Reading Division, ran from East Mahanoy Junction to Jim Thorpe via Nesquehoning. The RBMN had run over this line via trackage rights, but with this acquisition was able to control maintenance and dispatching on the line. The railroad immediately announced $1M in repairs, in order that the line might be brought to FRA Class III standards.

On April 21, 2022, railroad officials announced their purchase of the property of the former KME Fire Apparatus plant in Nesquehoning for $2 million. The Reading and Northern now uses these facilities for maintenance of locomotives, passenger equipment, freight cars, and company automobiles, as well as storage. On June 22, 2024, the Reading & Northern debuted its new Nesquehoning Station at the former KME site for the day's Iron Horse Ramble to Tunkhannock.

== Connections ==
RBMN interchanges with the following freight railroads:

- Norfolk Southern Railway – Reading, North Reading, Temple, Lehighton, the historic Mountain Top Yard at Penobscot Knob, and Taylor, where it connects to former Delaware and Hudson Railway trackage in New Jersey, New York, and New England. The northern spur connects the yard in Binghamton, New York, and then to lower eastern New York state:
- Delaware-Lackawanna Railroad – Pittston at the Duryea yard, which is operated by the RBMN.
  - Connects along the left bank trackage along the main Susquehanna River to New York State railways via the former Lehigh Valley Railroad through the yard at Sayre, Pennsylvania, reaching Rochester, Buffalo, and Erie, Pennsylvania
- Lehigh Railway – Mehoopany, Towanda
- Luzerne & Susquehanna Railroad – Pittston
- Shamokin Valley Railroad – Locust Summit

== Equipment ==
Numbers	Image	Builder	Model	Quantity
225		Canadian Locomotive Company	4-6-0	1
250-251		EMD	F7A	2
270		EMD	F9A	1
275		EMD	F7B	1
425		Baldwin Locomotive Works	4-6-2	1
2102		RDG	T-1 (4-8-4)	1
9166		Budd	RDC-3	1
9163-9165, 9167-9168		Budd	RDC-1	5
800-801		EMD	SW8	2
802-803		EMD	SW8M	2
1540-1543		EMD	MP15	4
1546, 1548		EMD	SW1500	2
2000, 2003-2004		EMD	SD38	3
2011-2015, 2017, 2023, (Note: (ex-2016, renumbered for 40th anniversary)) 2026 (Note: (ex-2010, Painted for the U.S. semiquincentennial))		EMD	GP38-2	8
2530-2535		EMD	GP39RN	6
1776, (Note: (ex 3061, renumbered and repainted for the U.S. semiquincentennial)) 1983 (Note: (ex 3062, renumbered for 40th anniversary, painted in BM&R livery)), 3050-3060, 3063-3069		EMD	SD40-2	20
5014, 5017, 5022		EMD	SD50	3
5018-5021		EMD	SD50-2	4
5033, 5049		EMD	SD50M	2

== Passenger excursions ==
Lehigh Gorge Scenic Railway
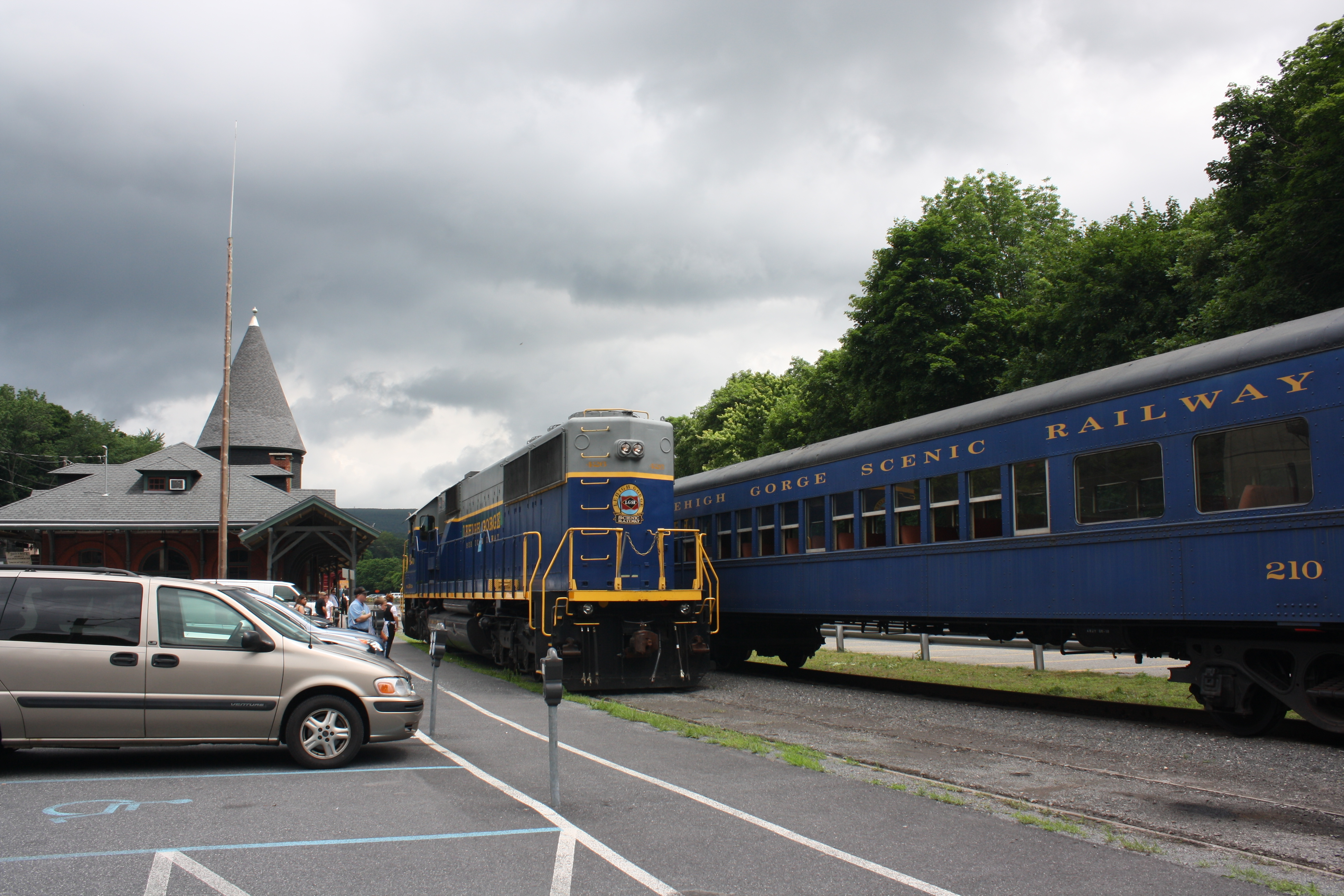
- The Lehigh Gorge Scenic Railway station in Jim Thorpe

Overview
- Headquarters: Port Clinton, Pennsylvania
- Reporting mark: LGSR
- Locale: Jim Thorpe, Pennsylvania
- Dates of operation: 2005–present
- Predecessor: Central Railroad of New Jersey

Technical
- Track gauge: 4 ft 8 1/2 in (1,435 mm) standard gauge
- Length: 16-mile (26 km)

Other
- Website: www.lgsry.com

The Lehigh Gorge Scenic Railway (reporting mark LGSR) is a tourist railroad that operates passenger excursions along RBMN trackage from the former Central Railroad of New Jersey station in Jim Thorpe to Old Penn Haven, following the Lehigh River through Lehigh Gorge State Park. Operations officially began in 2005, excursions run several times daily from April to November. The regular excursion consists of a 16-mile (26 km), 70-minute round-trip out of Jim Thorpe, following the Lehigh River to Lehigh Gorge State Park. In October, the LGSR operates abbreviated 45-minute trips that offer views of fall foliage in Lehigh Gorge State Park.

In addition, are several special excursions that are occasionally operated by the LGSR. The Hometown High Bridge train is a 30-mile (48 km), 2-hour round-trip excursion that runs on the first full weekend in October from Jim Thorpe through Nesquehoning to the 1,168-foot (356 m) long Hometown High Bridge that passes 168 feet (51 m) over the Little Schuylkill River, offering views of fall foliage. The Bike Train is a 25-mile (40 km), 1-hour one-way trip from Jim Thorpe to White Haven that allows passengers to take their bicycles onboard for the trip up grade, and then bike the 25-mile (40 km) journey along the Lehigh Gorge Trail from White Haven down to Jim Thorpe. LGSR trains are usually diesel-powered and consist of an open-air car, standard coaches, a gondola car that allows passengers to transport the bicycles aboard the train and ride their bicycles back to Jim Thorpe, and a caboose.

The RBMN also operates passenger excursions out of the Reading Outer Station located outside of Reading in Muhlenberg Township, with Rail Diesel Car trains running from Reading Outer Station to Jim Thorpe with an intermediate stop in Port Clinton. The train runs from Reading and Port Clinton to Jim Thorpe in the morning, allowing passengers time to explore Jim Thorpe. The return trip leaves Jim Thorpe in the late afternoon and returns to Port Clinton and Reading in the evening. This excursion operates on select weekends and holidays from May to November.

On May 27, 2023, the RBMN inaugurated excursion service from their new Wilkes-Barre/Scranton Regional Railroad Station in Pittston to Jim Thorpe. Service from this station mirrors that of Reading Outer Station, with trains leaving Pittston in the morning, arriving to Jim Thorpe around noon, and then returning to Pittston in the evening.

The Iron Horse Rambles are several excursions occurring throughout the summer that are pulled by steam locomotive № 2102. A spiritual successor to the Reading Company excursions of the same name, trips have run between Reading Outer Station and Jim Thorpe, as well as up the Lehigh Division from Nesquehoning to either Tunkahannock or Pittston. These trains are often in excess of 16 cars, and are popular with tourists and railfans alike. The Rambles offer a unique experience in America: a steam locomotive working unassisted to pull a full length passenger train over a great distance.

Preceded by Wisconsin and Southern Railroad	Regional Railroad of the Year; 2002	Succeeded by Indiana Harbor Belt Railroad
Preceded by Arkansas and Missouri Railroad	Regional Railroad of the Year; 2015	Succeeded by Central Maine and Quebec Railway
Preceded by Rapid City, Pierre and Eastern Railroad	Regional Railroad of the Year; 2020	Succeeded by Lake State Railway
