= Duryea, Pennsylvania =

Borough in Pennsylvania, US

- Borough
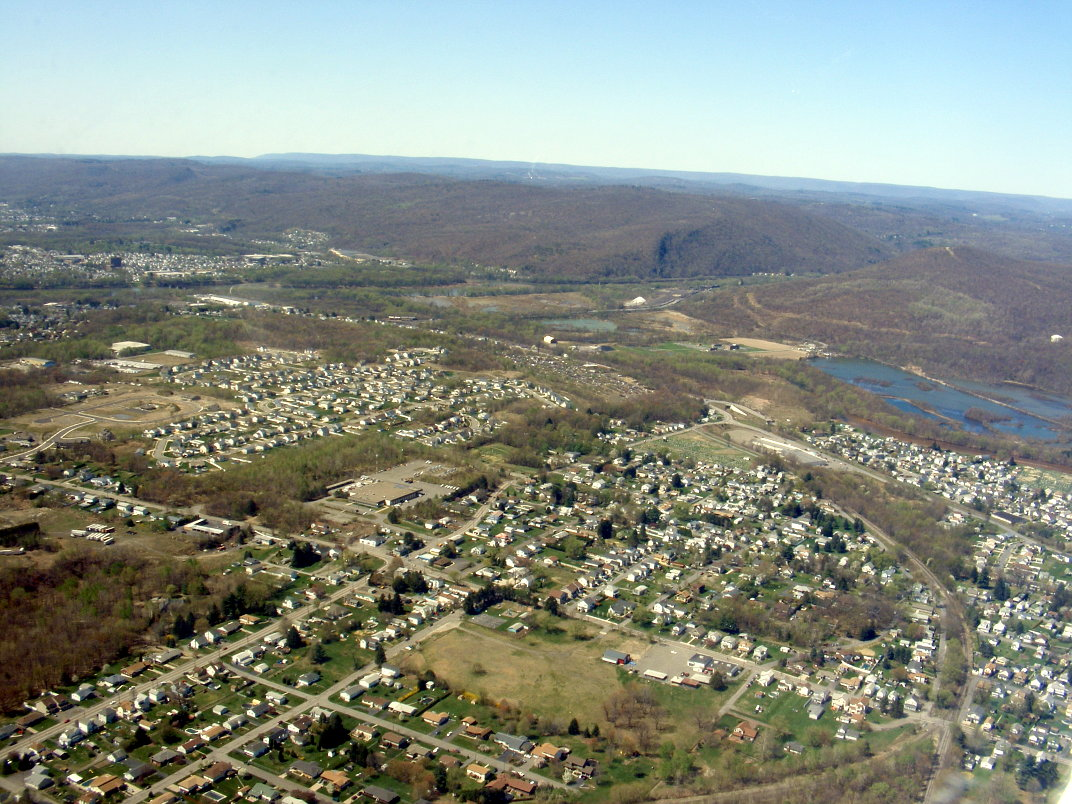
- Aerial view of Duryea, looking southwest

- Location of Duryea in Luzerne County, Pennsylvania.

- Location within Pennsylvania Location within the United States
- Coordinates: 41°20′52″N 75°45′30″W
- Country: United States
- State: Pennsylvania
- County: Luzerne
- Region: Greater Pittston
- Incorporated: 1901

Government
  - Type: Borough Council
  - Mayor: Jeffrey Bauman
  - Council President: Justin Tonte
  - Council Vice President: John Rowlands

Area
  - Total: 5.71 sq mi (14.80 km^{2})
  - Land: 5.53 sq mi (14.31 km^{2})
  - Water: 0.19 sq mi (0.49 km^{2})
- Elevation: 623 ft (190 m)

Population (2020)
  - Total: 5,036
  - Density: 911.4/sq mi (351.91/km^{2})
- Time zone: UTC-5 (Eastern (EST))
  - Summer (DST): UTC-4 (EDT)
- Zip code: 18642
- Area code: 570
- FIPS code: 42-20512
- Website: www.duryeaborough.com

Duryea is a borough in the Greater Pittston area of Luzerne County, Pennsylvania, United States, 9 miles (14 km) south of Scranton. The Susquehanna River marks Duryea's western boundary and the Lackawanna River flows through Duryea. It was incorporated as a borough in 1901, and had a notable switching rail yard, the Duryea yard (or Muller yard), connecting the central Wyoming Valley to destinations in lower New York and down-state Pennsylvania (in Harrisburg and Philadelphia). Coal mining and silk manufacturing were the chief industries in Duryea's early years. The population was 5,032 at the 2020 census.

== History ==
=== Early history ===
The area now known as Duryea Borough was historically the heartland of the Susquehannock tribe, also called the Conestoga, which were an Iroquoian people whose territory extended from lower New York State to the Potomac. The Susquehannock befriended the Dutch traders by 1612, who soon began trading tools and firearms for furs. The Dutch had established their trading posts along the rivers near where two natural Indian trails allowed them to make contact with the Conestoga— these were the sometimes disputed lands of the Susquehannocks and the rival Delaware nation (Lenape people).

The Dutch, while buying the lands for their settlements on the Hudson and Delaware in Lenape lands, soon developed frictions with their hosts and eventually formed an alliance with the more warlike and fierce Susquehannocks. In the 1630s, the Susquehannocks and the Lenape people warred. In 1642, the British Province of Maryland declared war on the Susquehannocks and over eight mostly inconsequential years of warfare, while the Dutch allied themselves with the Susquehannocks, lost it to the Dutch and the Indians.

A few years later, the English Sea Power defeated the Dutch ending their continued influence in North America. The Conestoga continued to grow in strength. In the 1660s, the area supported a military conquest which greatly weakened two of the western Iroquois tribes: the Seneca and Catagua. They were also struck by three years of plague (around 1670) in which 9 out of 10 Susquehannocks died. In the next few years, renewed war with the Iroquois kept the tribe from recovering and only a pale remnant of its strength relocated to the plains area now between Harrisburg and Philadelphia, where they came to deal with William Penn and the new colonial Province of Pennsylvania.

=== Establishment ===
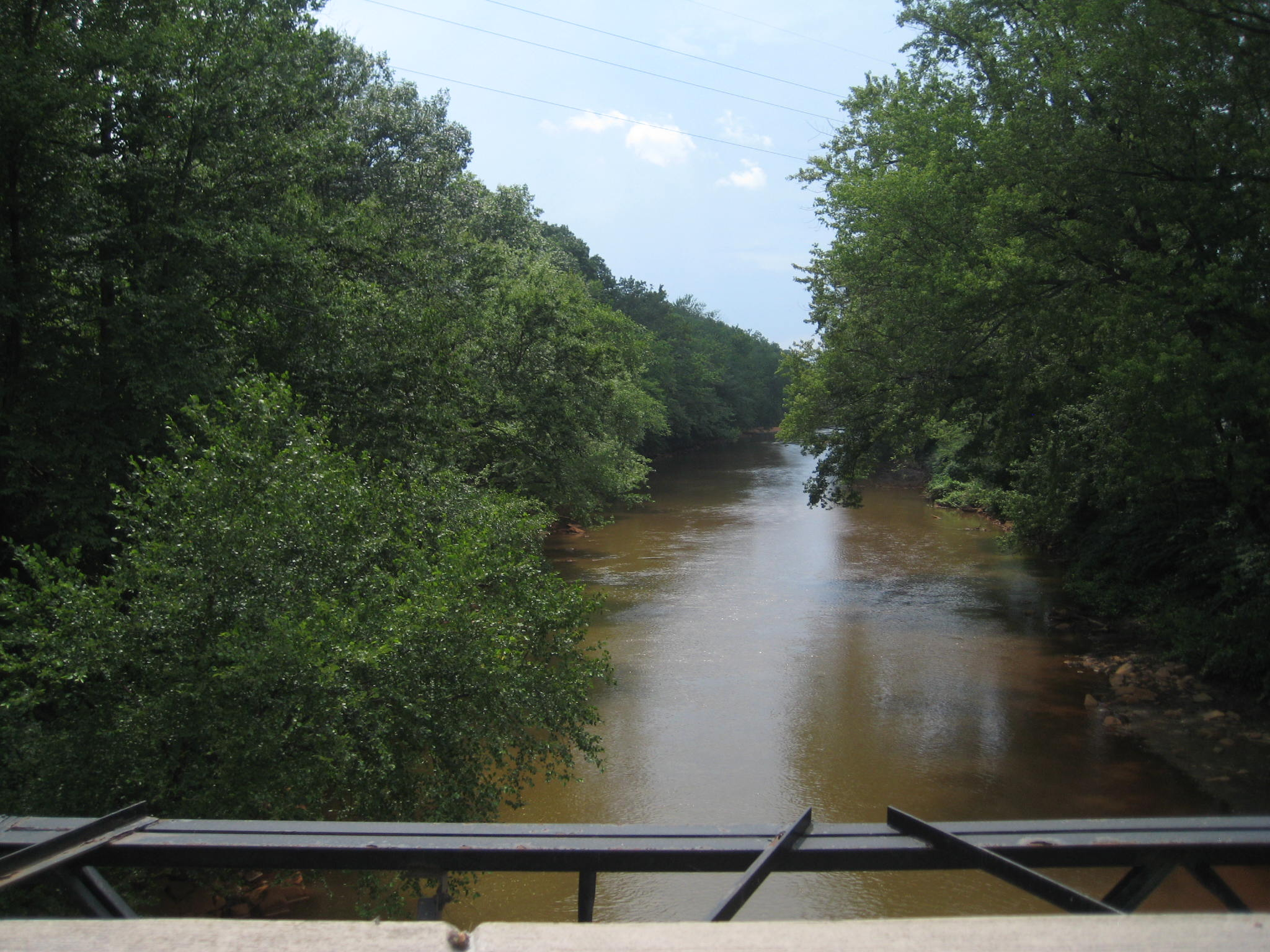
Lackawanna River in Duryea

Forty original settlers arrived from Connecticut on February 8, 1769, and set up temporary cabins near the confluence of the Lackawanna and Susquehanna rivers, the area now at the southern end of Duryea Borough. One of the first settlers was Zebulon Marcy, from whom Marcy Township got its name. He built the first log cabin in 1770 on the west side of Duryea's present-day Main Street (not far from the Old Forge line). As more settlers located in the area, the development of mining caused the citizenry to petition for township status. Marcy Township was founded in 1880 with a population of 1,159. A census of the township in 1894 noted a population of 2,396 and 475 dwellings in a 400-acre (160 ha) settlement. By the 1890s, the area was called Duryea.

Duryea grew in population and listed 1,005 registered voters in 1901, when it petitioned for reorganization as a Pennsylvania borough. The Borough of Duryea was incorporated on May 28, 1901; it was named in honor of Hiram Duryea, an American Civil War general and owner of extensive tracts of land in sections of the country. He was a prominent figure in the starch industry, a coal operator, and an official of the Delaware, Lackawanna and Western Railroad. It was the practice of this railroad to name its section stops after officials of the line, hence the name of Duryea. In one sense, like many communities in the country, the town is named after its railroad station.

=== Coal mining ===
Farming was the principal occupation in the early days. Pioneer settlers found many portions of the land suitable for raising food that they needed for existence. Shortly after, mining would become the area's greatest source of prosperity, along with silk mills and stone quarries.

Three large colliers once operated around Duryea. As in other nearby communities, the coal was often mined directly under the town itself. Remnants of strip mines and culm banks still litter the landscape to this day. After the Knox Mine Disaster (1959), which occurred only several miles outside of Duryea, the mining industry in the Wyoming Valley collapsed.

After the death of coal and the loss of the silk mill, the town encouraged the likes of Schott Optical and Topps Chewing Gum, Inc. to establish medium-sized plants in the town. However, these would never replace the jobs and revenue provided by coal. The borough witnessed a declining population along with a shrinking enrollment within its schools. This resulted in the takeover of the town's schools by the Pittston Area School District. The remaining neighborhood schools were eventually phased out and shut down with Duryea Elementary being shut down in 1981.

=== Early 21st century ===
The Reading & Northern Railroad Company invested in Duryea Yard (or Muller yard) in late 2009 and early 2010, laying track to accommodate 100 new rail cars and constructing a facility to store and hold up to 800 cars of sand to be used in hydraulic fracturing, or "fracking," operations at Marcellus Shale drill sites throughout northeastern Pennsylvania. There is a sand quarry operating just north of the borough limits along a line once traversed by rails leaving the yard during its heyday.

In September 2011, Hurricane Irene and Tropical Storm Lee caused severe flooding in the borough. It destroyed many homes and businesses along the Lackawanna River in Duryea, stretching from Phoenix Street to Elm Street. In the following days, Vice President Joe Biden and U.S. Senator Bob Casey visited the devastated sections of Duryea.

Also in 2011, the borough received national attention for its role in the landmark Supreme Court case Borough of Duryea v. Guarnieri, in which the court stated that "a government employer's allegedly retaliatory actions against an employee do not give rise to liability under the Petition Clause unless the employee's petition relates to a matter of public concern."

== Geography ==
The Borough of Duryea is located at 41°20′52″N 75°45′30″W (41.347729, -75.758302). The borough is located on the eastern bank of the Susquehanna River in northern Luzerne County. The Lackawanna River, which flows through the middle of Duryea, joins the Susquehanna on its eastern bank. Most of the borough's homes and businesses are located just south of the Lackawanna, while most of the land north of the river is forested mountains (e.g., Campbell's Ledge). Interstate 81 and U.S. Route 11 run through the easternmost section of Duryea. The borough is also part of Pittston Area School District.

According to the United States Census Bureau, the borough has a total area of 5.7 square miles (15 km^{2}), of which 5.5 square miles (14 km^{2}) is land and 0.2 square miles (0.52 km^{2}) (3.84%) is water.

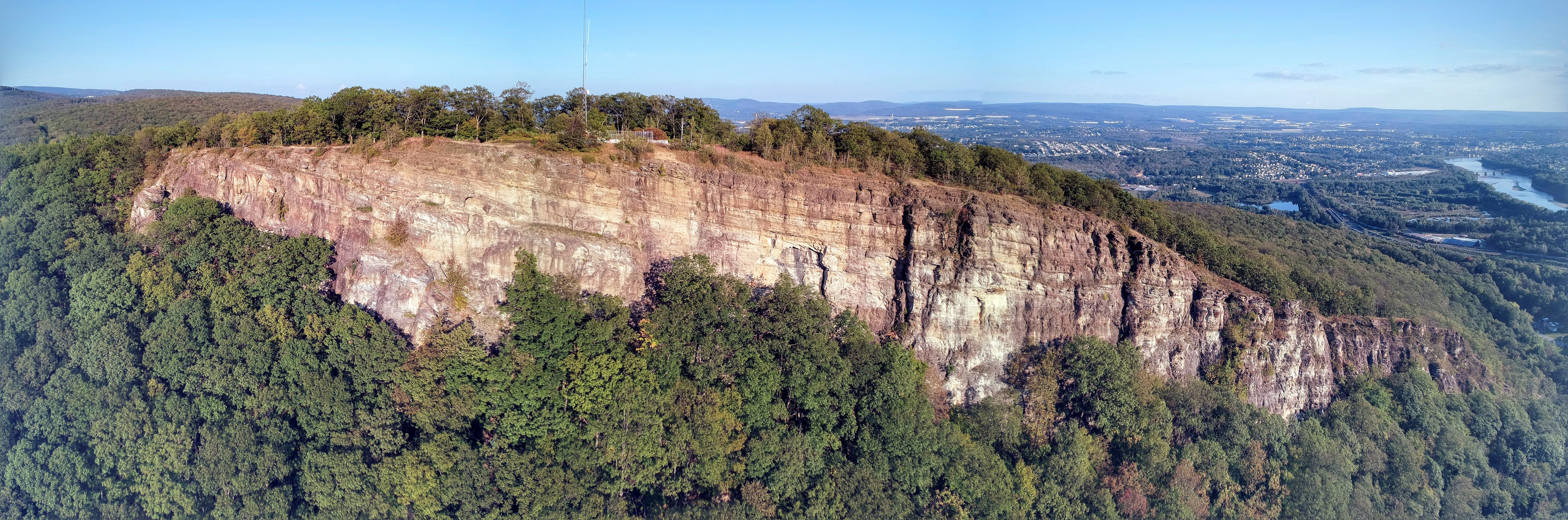
Campbell's Ledge in northern Duryea

== Demographics ==
Historical population
Census	Pop.	Note	%±
1910	7,487		—
1920	7,776		3.9%
1930	8,503		9.3%
1940	8,275		−2.7%
1950	6,655		−19.6%
1960	5,626		−15.5%
1970	5,264		−6.4%
1980	5,415		2.9%
1990	4,869		−10.1%
2000	4,634		−4.8%
2010	4,917		6.1%
2020	5,036		2.4%
2021 (est.)	5,041	▲	0.1%

At the 2000 census, there were 4,634 people, 1,984 households, and 1,297 families residing in the borough. The population density was 841.0 inhabitants per square mile (324.7/km^{2}). There were 2,151 housing units at an average density of 390.4 per square mile (150.7/km^{2}). The racial makeup of the borough was 98.86% White, 0.26% African American, 0.11% Native American, 0.35% Asian, 0.09% from other races, and 0.35% from two or more races. Hispanic or Latino of any race were 0.30% of the population.

There were 1,984 households, of which 24.0% had children under the age of 18 living with them, 49.0% were married couples living together, 12.1% had a female householder with no husband present, and 34.6% were non-families. 32.0% of all households were made up of individuals, and 17.6% had someone living alone who was 65 years of age or older. The average household size was 2.32 and the average family size was 2.94.

Age distribution was 19.1% under the age of 18, 6.5% from 18 to 24, 27.2% from 25 to 44, 26.5% from 45 to 64, and 20.6% who were 65 years of age or older. The median age was 43 years. For every 100 females there were 88.2 males. For every 100 females aged 18 and over, there were 86.4 males.

The median household income was $32,207, and the median family income was $41,775. Males had a median income of $32,715 versus $25,786 for females. The per capita income for the borough was $17,598. About 6.3% of families and 8.1% of the population were below the poverty line, including 2.6% of those under age 18 and 15.9% of those aged 65 or over.

== Government ==
The following is a list of government officials from Duryea Borough.

=== Officers ===
- Mayor: Jeffery Jef Bauman
- Council President: Stephanie Shupp
- Council Vice-President: Michael McGlynn

=== Councilors ===
- Eugene “Gino” Marriggi
- James "Munda" Gromelski
- Allison Brudzinski
- Justin Tonte
- Jeanne Zinkavich

== Education ==
It is in the Pittston Area School District.

== Notable people ==
- Gene Guarilia, Boston Celtics
- Albert K. Bender, UFO writer
