= Duryea Yard =

Rail yard in Pennsylvania, United States

Coordinates: 41.34300°N 75.786433°W

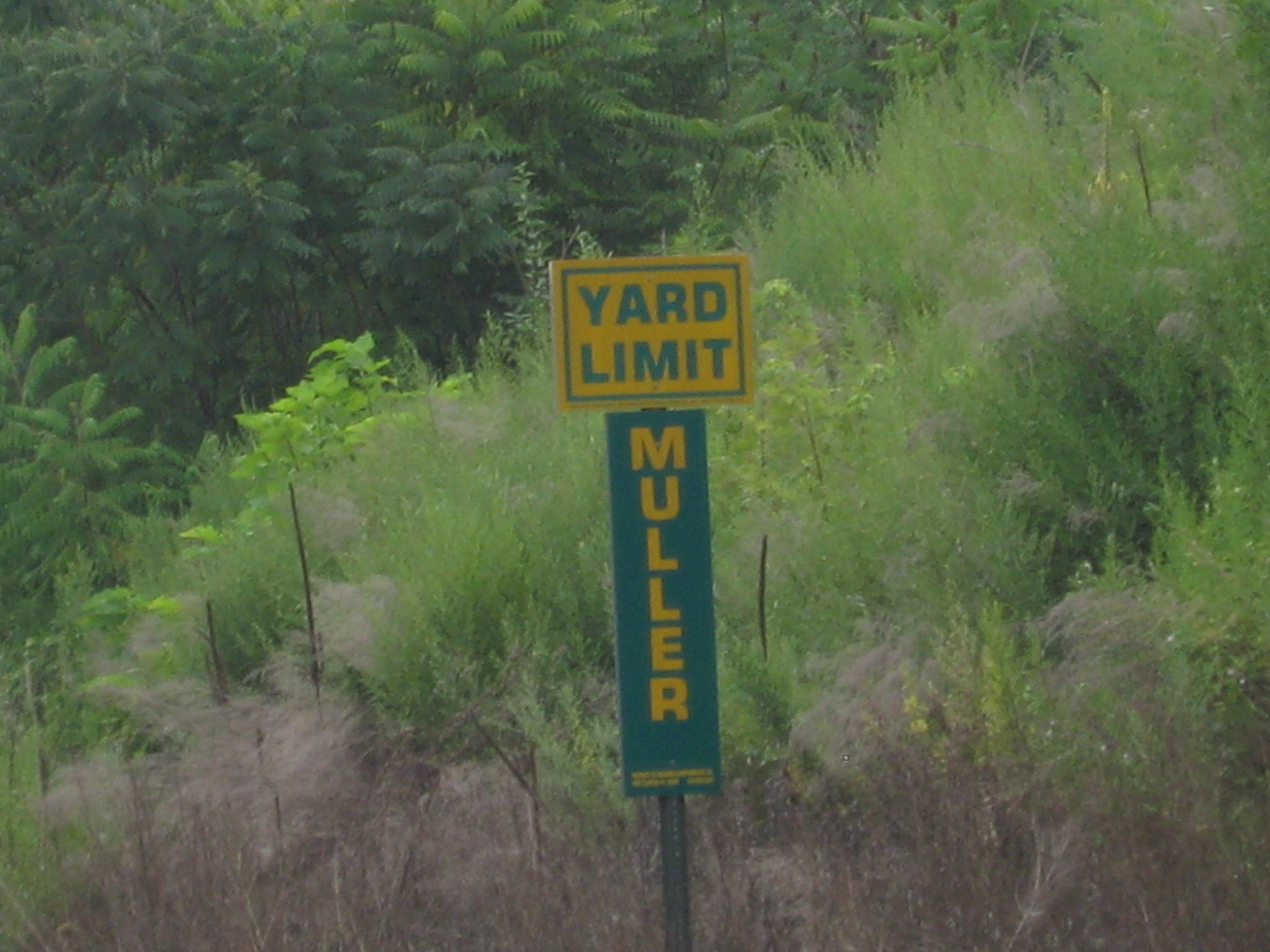
Duryea Yard was established in 1870 by Lehigh Valley Railroad and is currently operated by Reading Blue Mountain and Northern Railroad.

Duryea Yard (Note: Although 2017 RBM&N System Map names Duryea yard as such, in July 2013 a newly hung sign (See photo at right.) indicates RBM&N had renamed Duryea Yard as "Muller yard.") (formerly Coxton Yard, sometimes Pittston Junction, or West Pittston Yard) is a railroad yard in the Wyoming Valley region of Northeastern Pennsylvania currently operated by the Reading Blue Mountain and Northern Railroad. Originally constructed in 1870 by Lehigh Valley Railroad as a turn-around and staging hub for coal transport from the Coal Region to Eastern big-city markets, the yard remains a hub for the energy extraction industry today (as of 2017).

== History ==
=== Founding ===
While chartered in 1846, construction of Lehigh Valley Railroad (LVRR) was delayed for lack of investment subscriptions until into the early 1850s, when businessman Asa Packer was elected to the board of managers. LVRR was conceived with the idea of attempting to break Lehigh Coal & Navigation Company's (LC&N Co.) monopoly over bulk goods (Note: Bulk goods shipping until the 1920s was mainly anthracite coal, the new wonder fuel only made available after 1820, but the Lehigh Canal and railroads that followed also carried timber, lumber, cement, iron ore, stone goods, finished goods, anthracite pig iron and finished iron work, and later, steel.) shipping on the Wyoming Valley-Lehigh-Delaware route, which was dominated by Lehigh Canal (Note: Owned by the LC&N Co., as it did many of the mines in the southern Coal Region from Tresckow south to Tamaqua, and east along most of the Panther Creek Valley and Nesquehoning Creek valley.) from White Haven down river to Easton. LVRR initially connected at Mauch Chunk to the Beaver Meadows Railroad and extended to cross Delaware River just above Easton into Phillipsburg, New Jersey where it connected to the Morris Canal, the Central Railroad of New Jersey (CNJ) and two smaller railroads. This gave LVRR passenger traffic from Philadelphia and Trenton and points south, from New York City and rail connected New England communities, and freight traffic to and from all connected partners. Even before expanding northward to reach Wilkes-Barre, Pennsylvania, the LVRR had become the trunk line for shipping by rail in the entire Lehigh Valley; shortly after purchasing Penn Haven and White Haven Railroad, LVRR completed its line to Wilkes-Barre in 1868.

At that time, all industrial activity was powered in some form by coal, and the Wilkes-Barre/Scranton area was a center of the coal mining industry. LVRR and its competitors expanded rapidly, and LVRR needed created Duryea Yard to handle the traffic.

=== 20th century ===
Duryea Yard remained busy during the second half of the 19th century and the first half of the 20th. Following World War II, large dump trucks began to supplant rail for bulk coal hauling. Furthermore, rail companies began to dieselize to cut costs and remain competitive as the Interstate Highway System provided a novel form of highly subsidized competition. Even though the shift to interstate highways was somewhat delayed in the mountainous Eastern Pennsylvania terrain, the shift to diesel was already eliminating much of the LVRR's revenues. The railroad's steadiest profits came from carrying the cement and steel products necessary to build the interstate highways. The Duryea Yard declined as I-81 finally came to Scranton and airline travel began to compete with railroads on the few products that needed to be shipped faster than by truck. By the start of the 21st century, Duryea Yard was mostly unused.

=== 21st century ===
In late 2009 and early 2010, Reading Blue Mountain and Northern Railroad expanded operations due to the emergence of Marcellus Shale natural gas drilling in Northeastern Pennsylvania. The Reading & Northern Railroad spent $100,000 to transform the Pittston Yard to a sand transloading facility to transfer sand from rail cars to trucks, which is then used by natural gas well drillers in the Marcellus Shale region. The upgrades to the railyard included laying new track to accommodate 100 new rail cars and constructing a facility to store and hold up to 800 cars of sand to be used in fracking at Marcellus Shale drill sites throughout Northeastern Pennsylvania.

== Geography ==
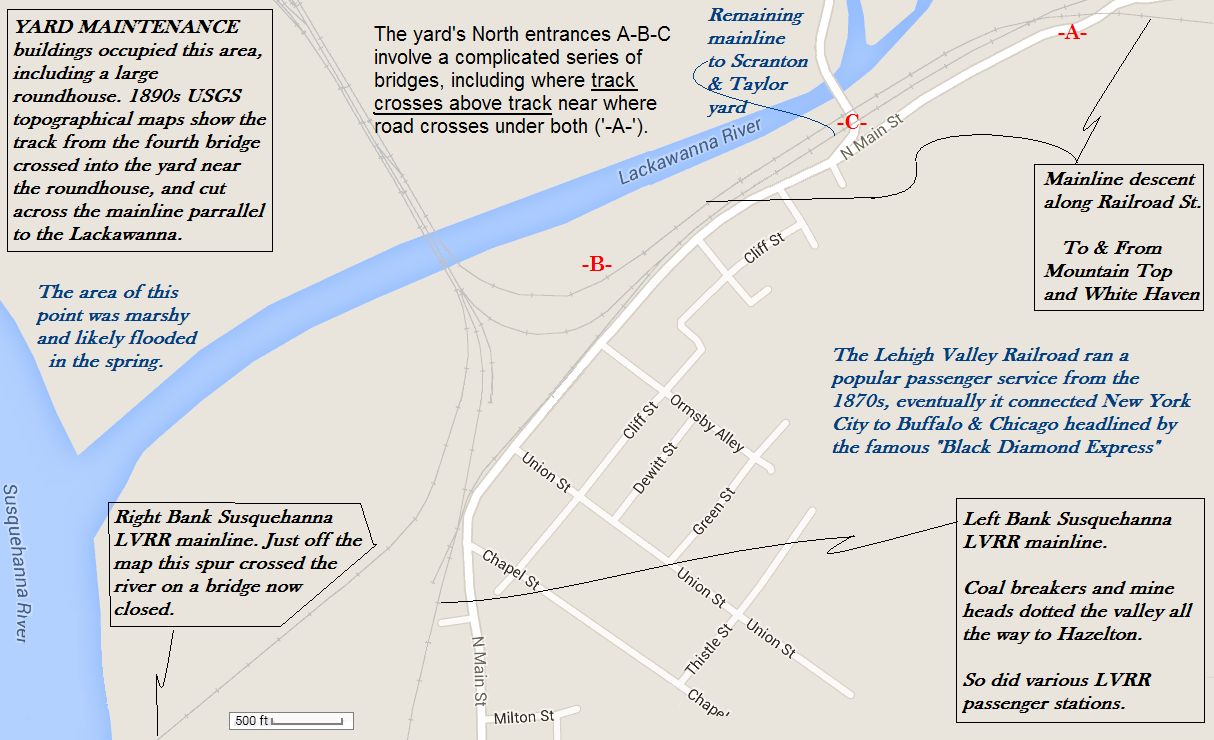
South entrance of Duryea yard and environs. At -B- both northbound mainlines are of equal height; running further northeast, the more northerly track to Mountain Top flies over the more southerly one to Scranton. Both elevations are well below Main St. at '-C-', the underpass below Coxton Road. Coxton Road leads immediately to some light industry, but, then, herded by Campbell's Ledge, parallels the yard and subsequent northbound main.

The yard lies in the borough of Duryea, a bedroom neighborhood of Pittston, itself a secondary community of Wilkes-Barre and Scranton so part of the Wilkes-Barre/Scranton metropolitan area. Physically, the yard is located on the main branch of the Susquehanna River and in the peninsula formed by the confluence of the Lackawanna.

The main Wyoming Valley entrance is through a railyard wye to the mainline, running westbound on both sides of the Susquehanna and eastbound to Mountain Top. Historically, the wye was doubled and connected to a long staging (transfer) track, but only parts of the doubling remain (see map at right). Continuing into the yard from the wye is to cross a bridge built for four tracks, although now only supporting three. This historically contained several crossovers fanning out to various service tracks and buildings within the yard.

On the north side, the yard connects to the LVRR's northbound main to Sayre, Pennsylvania.
