= Campbell's Ledge =

Coordinates: 41.359163°N 75.794680°W

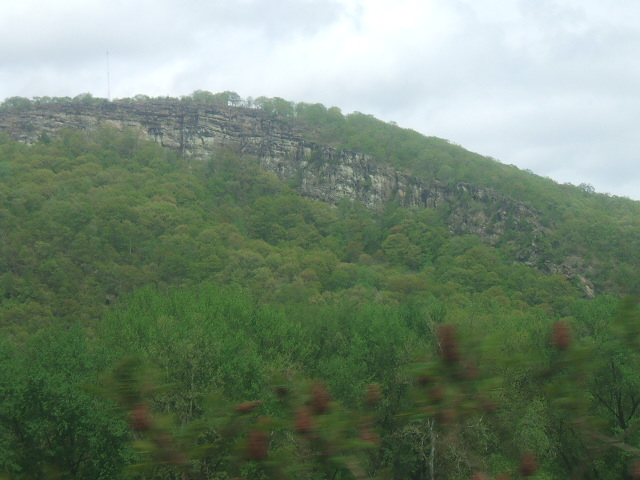
Campbell's Ledge

Campbell's Ledge is a geographical feature in Duryea, Luzerne County, Pennsylvania. It is about 1,280 feet (390 m) above sea level. It is located about 0.3 miles (0.48 km) south of the center of the nearby Campbell's Ledge Reservoir. It features a multipurpose antenna for emergency services.

== History ==
There are two stories for the name. A legend claims that a man named Campbell is chased by hostile Native Americans to the ledge, and, rather than risk capture, he jumps off. A second origin is traced to Thomas Campbell, the author of Gertrude of Wyoming. The Pennsylvania Fish and Boat Commission says it is also known as "Dial Rock"; early settlers used it as a sundial, as the face of the cliff illuminates at noon.

== View ==
If looked closely at (especially in winter) you could see the face of the cliff makes a '2'. On a clear day, you can see approximately a 30-mile stretch of the Wyoming Valley, which is cut by the Susquehanna River directly below the ledge. It is listed as one of the stops on the Susquehanna River Water Trail, North Branch. The cliff faces south and a bit west, so it doesn't catch the morning light.

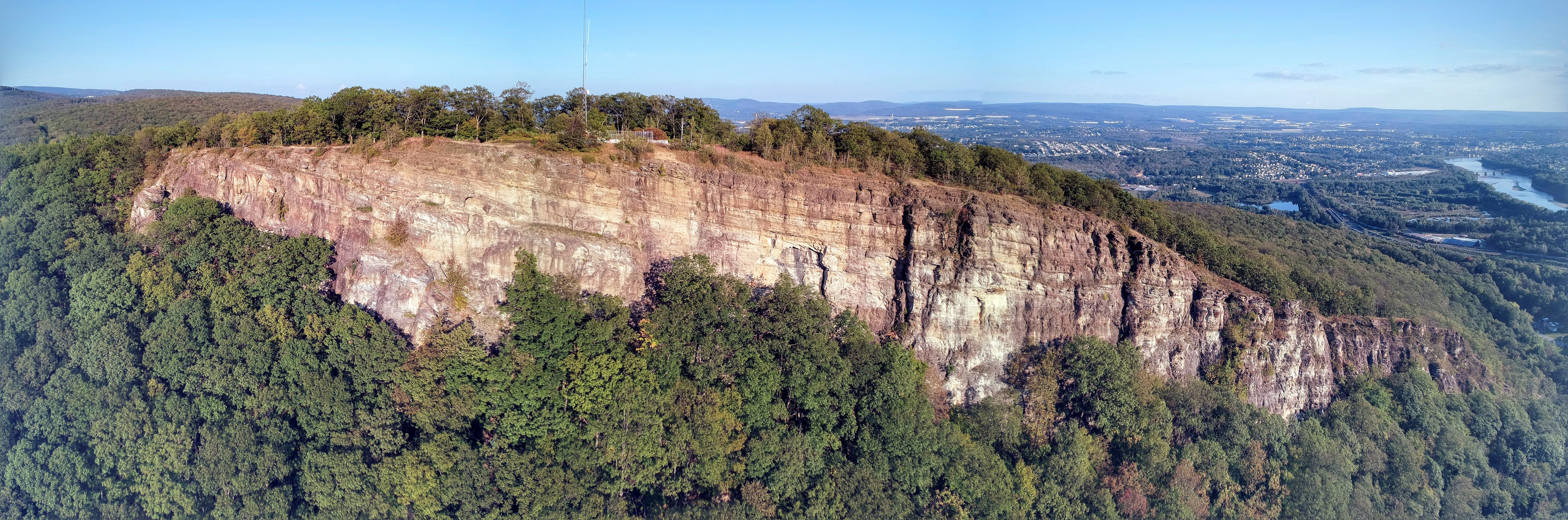
Campbell's Ledge in northern Duryea

== Nearby structures ==
There are a couple of abandoned mine shafts. They are since filled in partially and fenced in for safety reasons. There is a small lake at the top called the Campbell's Ledge Reservoir which has a very high Largemouth Bass, Perch and Bluegill population. Currently, it is permitted to fish the reservoir. The wooded area surrounding Campbell's ledge consists of many ATV and hiking trails. Traveling along these trails, many beautiful natural structures can be found, including waterfalls and streams.

== Wildlife ==
The area surrounding Campbell's ledge is teeming with wildlife. Inhabiting the area are white tailed deer, foxes, coyote, turkey, bear, ducks, geese, cranes, rabbits, hawks and a few species of snakes, among others.

== See also ==
- Battle of Wyoming
- Wyoming Monument
- Wyoming Commemorative Association
- Pennamite–Yankee War
- Exeter, Pennsylvania
- Luzerne County, Pennsylvania
