= Temple, Pennsylvania =

Unincorporated community in Pennsylvania, US

- Census-designated place
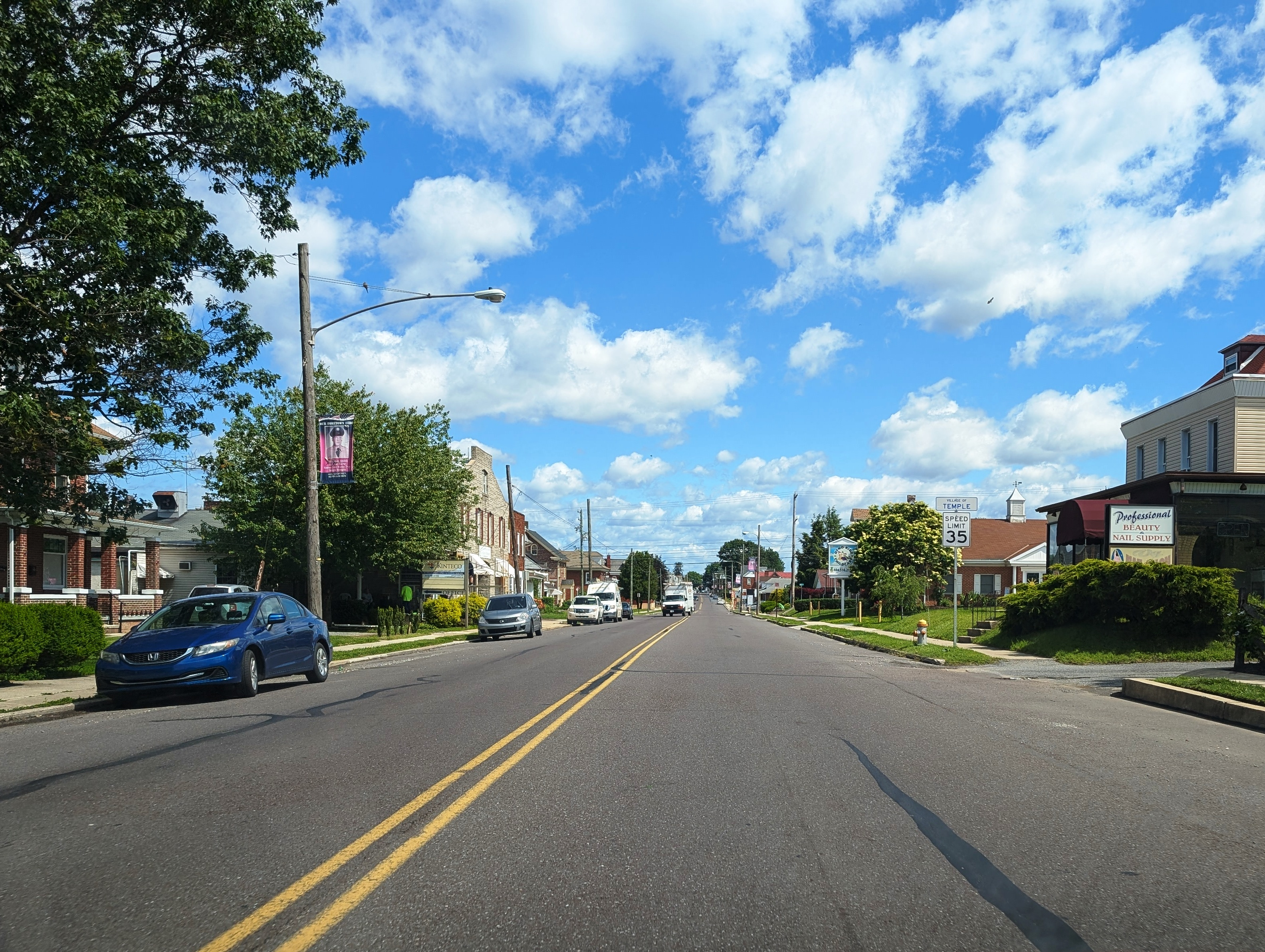
- Kutztown Road northbound entering Temple

- Location within the U.S. state of Pennsylvania Temple (the United States)
- Coordinates: 40°24′31″N 75°55′19″W
- Country: United States
- State: Pennsylvania
- County: Berks
- Township: Muhlenberg
- Incorporated: 1922
- Disincorporated: January 1, 1999
- Elevation: 361 ft (110 m)

Population (2020)
  - Total: 2,073
- Time zone: UTC-5 (Eastern (EST))
  - Summer (DST): UTC-4 (EDT)
- ZIP code: 19560
- Area codes: 610 and 484

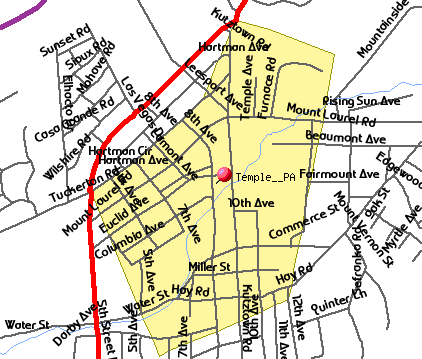
Map of Temple before it was dissolved

Temple is a census-designated place in Muhlenberg Township, Berks County, Pennsylvania, United States at an elevation of 361 feet (110 m). The community was named for a local inn called Solomon's Temple. Temple was an independent borough from 1922 until it was disincorporated on January 1, 1999. The ZIP code is 19560. As of the 2022 American Community Survey, the population was 2,251 residents.

== Education ==
Temple is part of the Muhlenberg School District.
