= List of Northeast Corridor infrastructure =

This is a list of major infrastructure on the Northeast Corridor, a rail line running through the Northeastern United States. The list includes major interlockings, bridges, tunnels, and past and present stations, including the Massachusetts Bay Transportation Authority's Orange Line, the Washington Metro's Orange Line, and PATH stations on separate tracks but sharing the right-of-way. It is intended as a companion to the list of stations in the main article.

- Amtrak lines: AE=Acela Express, AD=Adirondack, CD=Cardinal, CL=Carolinian, CS=Crescent, EAE=Ethan Allen Express, ES=Empire Service, FL=Floridian, HL=Hartford Line, KS=Keystone, LS=Lake Shore Limited, ML=Maple Leaf, NR=Northeast Regional, PA=Pennsylvanian, PL=Palmetto, SM=Silver Meteor, VF=Valley Flyer, VT=Vermonter (note that not all trains of that designation necessarily stop at all marked stations)
- MARC: Served by MARC Penn Line trains.
- MBTA: Served by MBTA Providence/Stoughton Line, Franklin/Foxboro Line, Needham Line, Fairmount Line, and / or Framingham/Worcester Line trains.
- MNR: Served by MTA Metro-North Railroad New Haven Line, Danbury Branch, New Canaan Branch, and / or Waterbury Branch trains.
- NJT: Served by New Jersey Transit Atlantic City Line, Montclair-Boonton Line, Morristown Line, Gladstone Branch, North Jersey Coast Line, and Northeast Corridor Line
- LIRR: Served by Long Island Rail Road City Terminal Zone portion of Main Line trains to Penn Station.
- PATH: Served by Newark – World Trade Center trains.
- SEPTA: Served by SEPTA Regional Rail Airport Line, Wilmington/Newark Line, Media/Wawa Line, Trenton Line, and / or Chestnut Hill West Line trains.
- SLE: Served by Shore Line East trains.

== North to South ==
Stations, etc.
State	Miles	City	Station or other	Amtrak	Other		Owner	Connections
MA	228.7	Boston	South Station	AE NR LS	MBTA		MBTA	MBTA Red Line, Silver Line, Greenbush Line, Framingham/Worcester Line, Fairmount Line, Fall River/New Bedford Line, Kingston Line
MA	227.6	Boston	Back Bay	AE NR LS	MBTA		MBTA	MBTA Orange Line; split with Framingham/Worcester Line
MA	226.5	Boston	Ruggles		MBTA		MBTA	MBTA Orange Line
MA	223.7	Boston	Forest Hills		MBTA		MBTA	MBTA Orange Line; split with Needham Line
MA	220.6	Boston	Hyde Park		MBTA		MBTA	
MA	219.2	Boston	Readville		MBTA		MBTA	MBTA Fairmount Line; split with Franklin/Foxboro Line. NEC platforms only used in emergencies
MA	217.3	Westwood	Route 128	AE NR	MBTA		Amtrak	Park and ride
MA	213.9	Canton	Canton Junction		MBTA		MBTA	Split with Stoughton branch
MA	210.8	Sharon	Sharon		MBTA		MBTA	
MA	204.0	Mansfield	Mansfield		MBTA		MBTA	
MA	196.9	Attleboro	Attleboro		MBTA		MBTA	
MA	191.9	Attleboro	South Attleboro		MBTA		MBTA	
	190.8	state line Massachusetts / Rhode Island						
RI	189.2	Pawtucket	Pawtucket/Central Falls		MBTA		MBTA	
RI	185.1	Providence	Providence	AE NR	MBTA		Amtrak	
RI	177.3	Warwick	T. F. Green Airport		MBTA		MBTA	
RI	165.8	Wickford	Wickford Junction		MBTA		MBTA	
RI	158.1	West Kingston	Kingston	NR			Amtrak	
RI	153.2	Shannock	Shannock					Served by Amtrak's Clamdigger and Beacon Hill commuter rail in the late 1970s and early 1980s. Torn down after Amtrak ended its commuter rail service.
RI	141.3	Westerly	Westerly	NR			Amtrak	
	141.1	state line Rhode Island / Connecticut						
CT	132.3	Stonington	Mystic	NR			Amtrak	
CT		New London / Groton	Thames River Bridge					Active moveable bridge over Thames River
CT	122.9	New London	New London	AE NR		SLE	Amtrak	
CT	116.74	East Lyme / Waterford	Niantic River Bridge					Active moveable bridge over Niantic River
CT		Old Saybrook / Old Lyme	Old Saybrook – Old Lyme Bridge					Active moveable bridge over Connecticut River
CT	105.1	Old Saybrook	Old Saybrook	NR		SLE	Amtrak	
CT	101.2	Westbrook	Westbrook			SLE	CTDOT	
CT	96.8	Clinton	Clinton			SLE	CTDOT	
CT	93.1	Madison	Madison			SLE	CTDOT	
CT	88.8	Guilford	Guilford			SLE	CTDOT	
CT	81.4	Branford	Branford			SLE	CTDOT	
CT	72.9	Division Post – Metro-North Railroad / Amtrak						
CT	72.7	New Haven	State Street	NR HL VF	MNR	SLE	CTDOT	
CT	72.3	New Haven	Union Station	AE NR HL VF VT	MNR	SLE	Amtrak	CTrail Hartford Line
CT	69.4	West Haven	West Haven		MNR		CTDOT	
CT	63.3	Milford	Milford		MNR		CTDOT	
CT	-	Milford	Devon				CTDOT	Closed passenger station; junction with MNRR Waterbury Branch. A temporary station at the wye was also used in 2015 during construction on the Housatonic River Railroad Bridge.
CT		Milford / Stratford	Housatonic River Railroad Bridge				CTDOT	Active moveable bridge over Housatonic River
CT	59.0	Stratford	Stratford		MNR		CTDOT	MNRR Waterbury Branch
CT	55.4	Bridgeport	Bridgeport	NR VT	MNR	SLE	CTDOT	
CT	52.3	Fairfield	Fairfield–Black Rock		MNR		CTDOT	
CT	50.6	Fairfield	Fairfield		MNR		CTDOT	
CT	48.9	Fairfield	Southport		MNR		CTDOT	
CT	47.2	Westport	Green's Farms		MNR		CTDOT	
CT	44.2	Westport	Westport		MNR		CTDOT	
CT	42.1	Norwalk	East Norwalk		MNR		CTDOT	
CT	41.0	Norwalk	South Norwalk		MNR		CTDOT	MNRR Danbury Branch
CT	39.2	Norwalk	Rowayton		MNR		CTDOT	
CT	37.7	Darien	Darien		MNR		CTDOT	
CT	36.2	Darien	Noroton Heights		MNR		CTDOT	
CT	33.1	Stamford	Stamford Transportation Center	AE NR VT	MNR	SLE	CTDOT	MNRR New Canaan Branch
CT	31.3	Greenwich	Old Greenwich		MNR		CTDOT	
CT	30.3	Greenwich	Riverside		MNR		CTDOT	
CT		Greenwich	Mianus River Railroad Bridge				CTDOT	Active moveable bridge over Mianus River
CT	29.6	Greenwich	Cos Cob		MNR		CTDOT	
CT	28.1	Greenwich	Greenwich		MNR		CTDOT	
	26.1	state line Connecticut / New York						
NY	25.7	Port Chester	Port Chester		MNR		MTA	
NY	24.1	Rye	Rye		MNR		MTA	
NY	22.2	Harrison	Harrison		MNR		MTA	
NY	20.5	Mamaroneck	Mamaroneck		MNR		MTA	
NY	18.7	Larchmont	Larchmont		MNR		MTA	
NY	16.6	New Rochelle	New Rochelle	NR	MNR		MTA	Metro-North to Grand Central
NY	-	New Rochelle	Shell					Junction with MNR New Haven Line to Woodlawn Junction (See MNR Harlem Line), Fordham, and Grand Central
NY	-	New Rochelle	Woodside					Closed passenger station
NY	-	Pelham Manor	Pelham Manor					Closed passenger station
NY	-	New York City	City Island					Closed passenger station; Also called Bartow
NY		New York City	Pelham Bay Railroad Bridge					Active moveable bridge over Hutchinson River; also called Hutchinson River Bridge
NY	-	New York City	Baychester					Closed passenger station
NY	-	New York City	Westchester					Closed passenger station
NY	-	New York City	Morris Park					Closed passenger station
NY	-	New York City	Van Nest					Closed passenger station
NY	-	New York City	West Farms					Closed passenger station
NY		New York City	Bronx River Railroad Bridge					Active moveable bridge over Bronx River
NY	-	New York City	Westchester Avenue					Closed passenger station; Once also served the New York, Westchester and Boston Railroad
NY	-	New York City	Hunt's Point					Closed passenger station; Once also served the New York, Westchester and Boston Railroad
NY	-	New York City	Casanova					Closed passenger station; Once also served the New York, Westchester and Boston Railroad
NY	-	New York City	Port Morris					Closed passenger station; Once also served the New York, Westchester and Boston Railroad
NY	-	New York City	Harlem River Terminal					Closed passenger station; Once also served the IRT Willis Avenue Spur and New York, Westchester and Boston Railroad
NY	-	New York City	Hell Gate Bridge					Active bridge over the East River
NY	3.2	New York City	Sunnyside		LIRR			Not yet open
NY	-	New York City	Harold Interlocking					Junction with LIRR Main Line
NY	-	New York City	East River Tunnels					Active tunnels under the East River
NY	0.0	New York City	New York Penn Station	AE AD CD CL CS EAE ES KS LS ML NR PA PL SM VT	LIRR	NJT	Amtrak, MTA, NJ Transit	LIRR: Trains to Long Island; NJT: Trains to New Jersey; NYCS: A, C, and E trains at Eighth Avenue, 1, 2, and 3 trains at Seventh Avenue
	1.2	state line New York / New Jersey						
NJ		Weehawken/Union City/North Bergen	North River Tunnels					under Bergen Hill and Hudson River
NJ	5.0	Secaucus	Secaucus Junction			NJT	NJ Transit	NJT to Hoboken and northern New Jersey, Orange and Rockland counties, New York
NJ	6.0	Secaucus / Kearny	Portal Bridge; Portal North Bridge					Active moveable bridge over Hackensack River; Replacement, the north bridge, is part of Gateway Program
NJ	7.3	Kearny	Swift					Junction with NJ Transit Kearny Connection to NJT Morris & Essex Lines to Dover, Hackettstown & Gladstone and Montclair-Boonton Line to Montclair Heights, Dover and Hackettstown
NJ	7.8; 7.96	Kearny	Sawtooth Bridges					Gateway Program
NJ	8.5	Kearny	Hudson					Former location of Manhattan Transfer; Current junction Waterfront Connection between NJT and Amtrak NEC
NJ	8.8	Kearny	Hudson Yard					Amtrak / NJT Yard
NJ	-	Harrison	Harrison		PATH		PANYNJ	Originally served by PRR & H&M
NJ	9.8	Newark	Dock Bridge					Active moveable bridge over Passaic River
NJ	10.0	Newark	Newark Penn Station	AE CD CL CS KS NR PA PL SM VT	PATH	NJT	NJ Transit	Newark City Subway, PATH
NJ	11.1	Newark	Cliff					Former Newark (South Street) station; consists of two crossovers that didn't fit at Hunter
NJ	11.7	Newark	Hunter					Hunter Connection Junction for NJT Raritan Valley Line to High Bridge & Raritan; Conrail Lehigh Line
NJ	12.6	Newark	Newark Airport	KS NR		NJT	PANYNJ	AirTrain
NJ	13.5	Newark	Lane					Junction for Conrail Greenville and Passaic & Harsimus Branches
NJ	14.4	Elizabeth	North Elizabeth			NJT	NJ Transit	
NJ	15.4	Elizabeth	Elizabeth			NJT	NJ Transit	
NJ	16.0	Elizabeth	Elmora					Interlocking Plant
NJ	16.1	Elizabeth	South Elizabeth					Closed passenger station
NJ	18.6	Linden	Linden			NJT	NJ Transit	Linden Yard
NJ	20.1	Rahway	North Rahway					Closed passenger station
NJ		Rahway	Rahway River Bridge					Rahway River
NJ	20.7	Rahway	Rahway			NJT	NJ Transit	
NJ	21.0	Rahway	Union					Junction with NJT North Jersey Coast Line to Bay Head.
NJ	22.8	Woodbridge	Colonia					Closed passenger station
NJ	24.0	Woodbridge	Iselin					Closed passenger station
NJ	24.6	Woodbridge	Metropark	AE KS NR VT		NJT	NJ Transit	Park and ride
NJ	27.1	Metuchen	Metuchen			NJT	NJ Transit	
NJ	27.3	Metuchen	Lincoln					Interlocking Plant
NJ	30.3	Edison	Edison			NJT	NJ Transit	
NJ		Highland Park/New Brunswick	Raritan River Bridge					Raritan River
NJ	32.7	New Brunswick	New Brunswick	KS NR		NJT	NJ Transit	
NJ	34.2	New Brunswick	County					County Yard; Junction Conrail Millstone Running Track
NJ	34.4	New Brunswick	Jersey Avenue			NJT	NJ Transit	Park and ride
NJ	36.8	North Brunswick	Adams					Closed passenger station
NJ	39.9	South Brunswick	Deans					Closed passenger station
NJ	42.4	South Brunswick	Monmouth Junction					Closed passenger station
NJ	42.6	South Brunswick	Midway					Interlocking plant; junction with Conrail Jamesburg Branch
NJ	48.3	Princeton Junction	Nassau					Junction with NJT Princeton Branch.
NJ	48.4	Princeton Junction	Princeton Junction	KS NR		NJT	NJ Transit	NJT Princeton Branch to Princeton
NJ	-	Hamilton Township (Mercer County)	Division Post – New Jersey / Philadelphia Divisions					
NJ	54.4	Hamilton Township (Mercer County)	Hamilton			NJT	NJ Transit	
NJ	55.8	Hamilton Township (Mercer County)	Millham					closed Interlocking Plant
NJ	57.8	Trenton	Fair					Junction for Belvedere-Delaware Secondary Track; Former junction for Bordentown Secondary Track; (See NJT River Line); Current Amtrak Division Post New York and Philadelphia Divisions
NJ	58.1	Trenton	Trenton Transit Center	AE CD CL CS KS NR PA SM VT	SEPTA	NJT	NJ Transit	NJT River Line to Camden
NJ		Trenton	Morrisville–Trenton Railroad Bridge					Delaware River
	59.2	state line New Jersey / Pennsylvania						
PA	59.6	Morrisville	Morrisville					Closed passenger station
PA	59.7	Morrisville	Morris					Junction for Norfolk Southern Trenton Cutoff and Morrisville Yard
PA	64.7	Tullytown	Levittown		SEPTA		SEPTA	
PA	67.8	Bristol	Bristol		SEPTA		SEPTA	
PA	70.7	Bristol Township	Croydon		SEPTA		SEPTA	
PA	72.4	Bensalem	Eddington		SEPTA		SEPTA	
PA	73.7	Cornwells Heights	Cornwells Heights	KS NR	SEPTA		SEPTA	
PA	75.8	Philadelphia	Torresdale		SEPTA		SEPTA	
PA	78.3	Philadelphia	Holmesburg Junction		SEPTA		SEPTA	
PA	79.3	Philadelphia	Tacony		SEPTA		SEPTA	
PA	81.2	Philadelphia	Bridesburg		SEPTA		SEPTA	
PA	82.8	Philadelphia	Frankford Junction					Closed station; junction with Atlantic City Line to Atlantic City
PA	86.0	Philadelphia	North Philadelphia	KS NR	SEPTA		SEPTA	
PA		Philadelphia	Connecting Railway Bridge					
PA	89.0; 0	Philadelphia	ZOO Interlocking					Split with Philadelphia to Harrisburg Main Line
PA	1.5	Philadelphia	30th Street Station	AE CD CL CS KS NR PA PL SM VT	SEPTA	NJT	Amtrak	New Jersey Transit Atlantic City Line, all SEPTA commuter rail lines Market-Frankford Line, Subway-Surface Trolley Lines
PA	5.8	Darby	Darby		SEPTA		SEPTA	
PA	6.5	Sharon Hill	Curtis Park		SEPTA		SEPTA	
PA	7.2	Sharon Hill	Sharon Hill		SEPTA		SEPTA	
PA	7.7	Folcroft	Folcroft		SEPTA		SEPTA	
PA	8.3	Glenolden	Glenolden		SEPTA		SEPTA	
PA	9.0	Norwood	Norwood		SEPTA		SEPTA	
PA	9.7	Prospect Park	Prospect Park		SEPTA		SEPTA	
PA	10.4	Ridley Park	Ridley Park		SEPTA		SEPTA	
PA	11.1	Ridley Park	Crum Lynne		SEPTA		SEPTA	
PA	12.3	Eddystone	Eddystone		SEPTA		SEPTA	
PA	13.4	Chester	Chester Transit Center		SEPTA		SEPTA	
PA	14.4	Chester	Lamokin Street		SEPTA		SEPTA	Flag stop, closed in 2003
PA	15.5	Chester	Highland Avenue		SEPTA		SEPTA	
PA	16.7	Marcus Hook	Marcus Hook		SEPTA		SEPTA	
	18.2	state line Pennsylvania / Delaware						
DE	19.6	Claymont	Claymont		SEPTA		DART	
DE	26.8	Wilimington (Wilmington Rail Viaduct)	Wilmington	AE CD CL CS NR PL SM VT	SEPTA		Amtrak	
DE	32.5	Wilimington (Wilmington Rail Viaduct)	Churchmans Crossing		SEPTA		DART	
DE	38.7	Newark	Newark	NR	SEPTA		DART	
	41.5	state line Delaware / Maryland						
MD	-	Elkton	Elkton					Closed passenger station
MD	59.5	Perryville	Perryville	NR	MARC		MTA	At wye junction with CSX Port Deposit Branch
MD	60.1	Perryville / Havre de Grace	Amtrak Susquehanna River Bridge		MARC			Active bridge over the Susquehanna River
MD	65.5	Aberdeen	Aberdeen	NR	MARC		MTA	
MD	72.1	Edgewood	Bush River Bridge					
MD	75.1	Edgewood	Edgewood		MARC		MTA	
MD	78.9	Edgewood	Gunpowder River Bridge					
MD	84.0	Middle River	Martin State Airport		MARC		MTA	
MD	95.7	Baltimore	Penn Station	AE CD CL CS NR PL SM VT	MARC		Amtrak	Maryland Transit Administration Light Rail
MD	98.5	Baltimore	West Baltimore		MARC		MTA	
MD	103.0	Halethorpe	Halethorpe		MARC		MTA	
MD	106.3	Linthicum	BWI Airport Rail Station	AE NR VT	MARC		Amtrak	
MD	113.6	Odenton	Odenton		MARC		MTA	
MD	119.4	Bowie	Bowie State		MARC		MTA	
MD	120.5	Bowie	Bowie Interlocking					Wye junction with Pope's Creek Subdivision (CSX)
MD	124.7	Seabrook	Seabrook		MARC		MDOT MTA	
MD	127.0	New Carrollton	New Carrollton	NR VT	MARC		Amtrak, WMATA, MTA	Orange Line (Washington Metro), park and ride
MD	128.8	Landover	Landover Interlocking					Junction with CSX Landover Subdivision
	131.6	state line Maryland / District of Columbia						
DC	131.8	Washington	Amtrak Railroad Anacostia Bridge					
DC	134.6; 1.1	Washington	C Interlocking					Junction with CSX Capital Subdivision and Metropolitan Subdivision
DC	0.0	Washington	Union Station	AE CD CL CS FL NR PL SM VT	MARC	VRE	Amtrak	VRE commuter rail, Metro Red Line, Amtrak trains to Virginia, Chicago, New Orleans, Miami, MARC commuter rail

== See also ==
- North–South Rail Link (proposed)
