= Subaru Park =

Soccer stadium in Chester, Pennsylvania

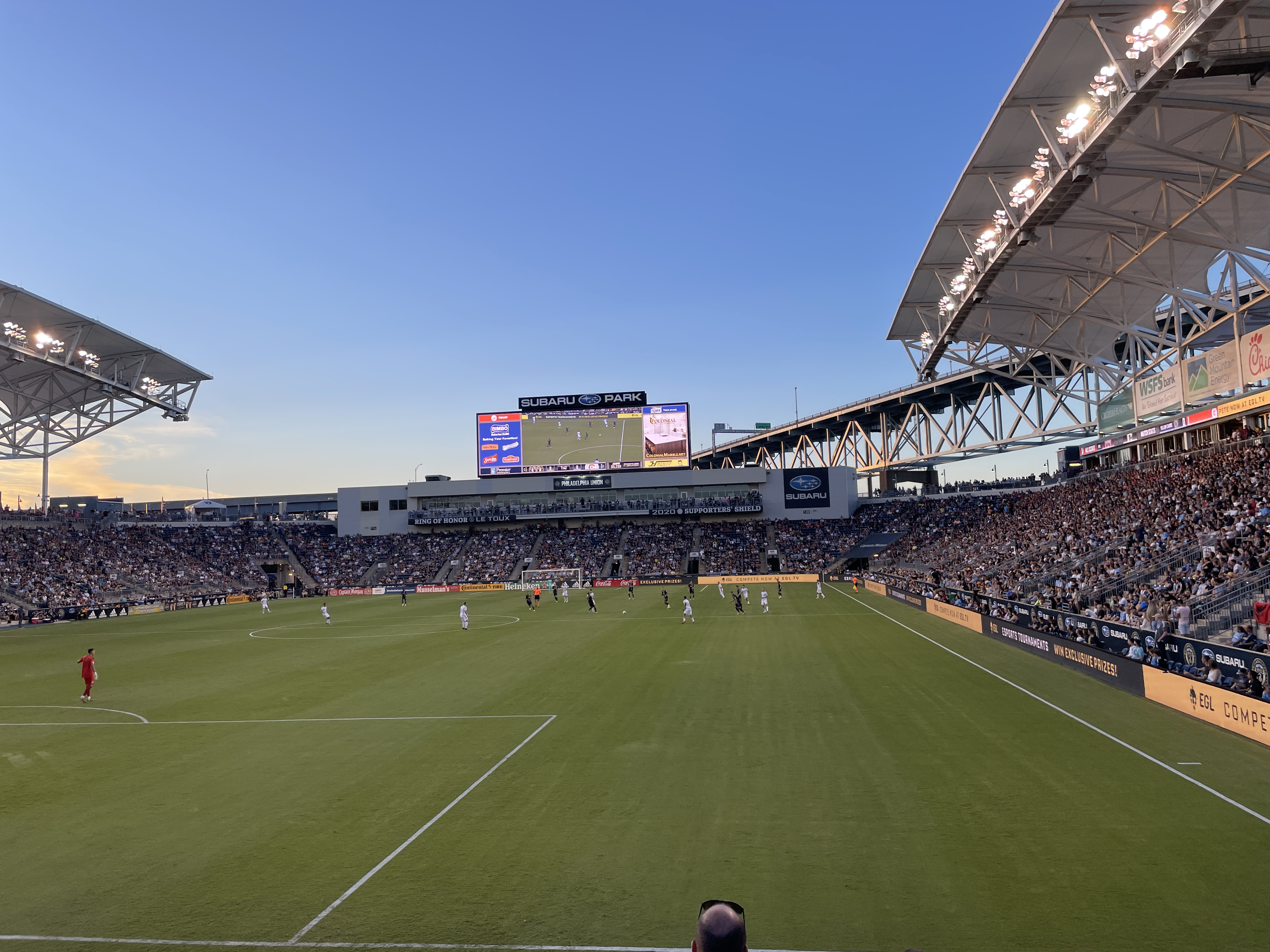
- View of Subaru Park from the Sons of Ben supporters section in August 2022

- Location of Subaru Park in Pennsylvania Location in the United States
- Former names: PPL Park (2010–2015); Talen Energy Stadium (2016–2019)
- Address: 1 Stadium Drive
- Location: Chester, Pennsylvania, U.S.
- Coordinates: 39°49′56″N 75°22′44″W
- Owner: Buccini/Pollin Group
- Operator: BPG Sports
- Capacity: 18,500 (Soccer); 26,000 (Concerts)
- Surface: Perennial Ryegrass and Kentucky Bluegrass
- Field size: 120 yd × 75 yd (110 m × 69 m)
- Public transit: SEPTA bus: 113 (at stadium); Chester Transit Center: Wilmington/Newark Line SEPTA bus: 37, 109, 114, 117, 118, 119

Construction
- Groundbreaking: December 1, 2008; 17 years ago
- Opened: June 27, 2010; 16 years ago
- Cost: $120 million ($177 million in 2025 dollars)
- Architect: Rossetti Architects
- Project manager: ICON Venue Group
- Structural engineer: Pennoni Associates Inc.
- General contractor: T.N. Ward Company

Tenants
- Philadelphia Union (MLS) (2010–present); Philadelphia Union II (MLSNP) (2019–2020, 2022–present)

Website
- philadelphiaunion.com/stadium/

Subaru Park is a soccer-specific stadium in Chester, Pennsylvania, located next to Commodore Barry Bridge on the waterfront along the Delaware River. The venue is home to the Philadelphia Union of Major League Soccer.

Subaru Park was designed as an initial step for economic development on the waterfront, with additional plans calling for a river walk and other entertainment, retail, and residential projects. The stadium was constructed by T.N. Ward Company, based in Ardmore. The project was the result of combined commitments of $30 million from Delaware County and $47 million from the Commonwealth of Pennsylvania. Subaru of America is the stadium's naming rights sponsor.

In North American competitions, the stadium is known as Philadelphia Stadium due to advertising rules.

== Construction ==
Major League Soccer (MLS) had been interested in entering the Philadelphia market for several years, with many promises of a team by Commissioner Don Garber, as evidenced by his statement, "It's not a matter of if but when Philadelphia gets a team." Initially, Major League Soccer was interested in a site in the borough of Bristol, about 23 miles (37 km) north of Center City Philadelphia. The plans never came to fruition, however. Rowan University later provided plans for a soccer stadium near its Glassboro, New Jersey campus, but funding from the state of New Jersey fell through in 2006.

In late 2006, a group of investors led by longtime MLS executive Nick Sakiewicz initiated the planning for a soccer-specific stadium in Chester after the funding for the Rowan project failed to pass the New Jersey legislature. After many months of negotiations, Delaware County politicians announced their approval of funding for the stadium in October 2007. Delaware County owns the land and the stadium itself, while the team owns the naming rights based on their approval of a 30-year lease. The newly formed Delaware County Sports Authority pays the county's share of $30 million through taxes from the Harrah's Chester harness racing track and casino. An additional $80 million was contributed by private investors.

On January 31, 2008, Pennsylvania's state government unveiled a combined soccer stadium and economic revitalization package for Chester. $25 million was allocated to the construction of the stadium, with an additional $7 million towards a two-phase project composed of 186 townhouses, 25 apartments, 335,000 square feet (31,100 m^{2}) of office space, a 200,000-square-foot (19,000 m^{2}) convention center, more than 20,000 square feet (1,900 m^{2}) of retail space, and a parking structure to house 1,350 cars. In phase two, another 200 apartments will be built, along with 100,000 square feet (9,300 m^{2}) of office space and 22,000 square feet (2,000 m^{2}) of retail space.

The Environmental Protection Agency (EPA) worked with the city to ensure that construction activities did not impact the nearby parking facility, which had been the site of the Wade Dump, a previously polluted Superfund site.

== Soccer ==
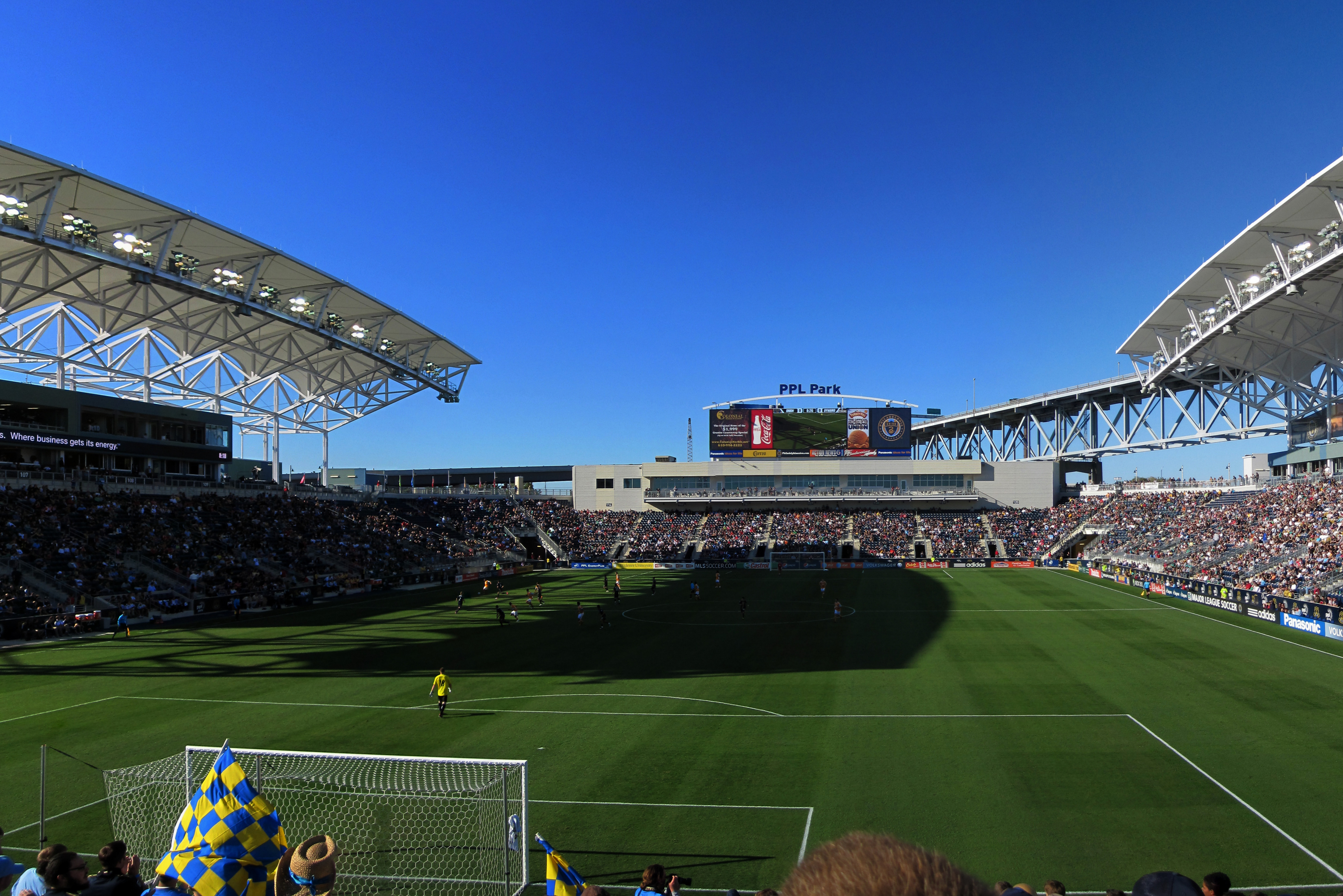
A 2010 regular season match against the Houston Dynamo, October 2010

Construction delays led to the Philadelphia Union's decision to play their inaugural home game at Lincoln Financial Field instead of Subaru Park. Their first match at the stadium was played on June 27, 2010, when they defeated Seattle Sounders FC 3–1. Sébastien Le Toux scored the Union's first goal at the stadium on a crossed header. However, Pat Noonan of Sounders FC scored the first goal in the venue's history.

The stadium's record attendance was achieved on December 5, 2021, for the 2021 Eastern Conference Final when the Union were defeated by New York City FC 2–1 in front of 19,487 fans.

Due to consistently high attendance and ticket sales, in 2011 the Philadelphia Union expressed interest in expanding the capacity of the stadium. The planned expansion would occur in three phases, initially to 20,000, then to 27,000, and finally to approximately 30,000. In 2024, the club commissioned Gensler to study an expansion of the stadium, which would be able to accommodate 27,000 seats on its current footprint.

== Rugby union ==
=== Collegiate Rugby Championship ===
Subaru Park hosted the Collegiate Rugby Championship every June between 2011 and 2019. The Collegiate Rugby Championship is the highest profile college rugby competition in the United States, and is broadcast live on NBC annually. In 2011, over 17,800 fans attended the tournament.

Year	Final			TV Viewership	TV Ratings	Attendance	Ref.
Year	Winner	Score	Runner-up	TV Viewership	TV Ratings	Attendance	Ref.
2011	Dartmouth	32–10	Army	750,000 (Day 1); 797,000 (Day 2)	0.6 (Day 1); 0.6 (Day 2)	17,894	
2012	Dartmouth	24–5	Arizona		0.6 (Day 1); 0.6 (Day 2)	18,149	
2013	California	19–17	Life University			19,275	
2014	California	24–21	Kutztown	427,000	0.4 (Day 2); 0.5 (Day 3)	19,181	
2015	California	17–12	Kutztown	571,000 (Day 1); 647,000 (Day 2)	0.4 (Day 1); 0.4 (Day 2)	24,592	
2016	California	31–7	UCLA	506,000 (Day 1); 545,000 (Day 2)	0.3 (Day 1); 0.5 (Day 2)	27,224	
2017	California	19–0	Life University	427,000 (Day 1); 530,000 (Day 2)	0.3 (Day 1); 0.4 (Day 2)	37,518*	
2018	Lindenwood	24–7	UCLA			27,002	
2019	Lindenwood	21–12	Life University			27,587	
*The Saturday crowd set the CRC one-day attendance record with a crowd of 14,973.

=== English Premiership ===
It was announced on May 17, 2017, that English side Newcastle Falcons would play their home Premiership Rugby game against Saracens at the stadium on September 16, 2017. This was the second English premiership game hosted in the US and Saracens' second visit after London Irish hosted them at the Red Bull Arena in Harrison, New Jersey on March 12, 2016.

List of Premiership Rugby – The American Series games
Season	Date	Television	Home team	Result	Away Team	Tournament	Attendance	Ref.
2017–18	September 16, 2017	NBC	(England) Newcastle Falcons	7–29	(England) Saracens	Premiership Rugby	6,271	

=== United States national team ===
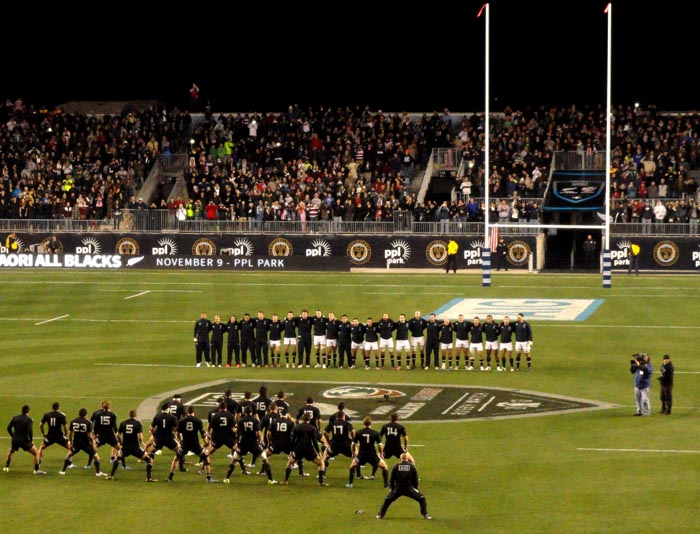
Māori All Blacks, a New Zealand rugby union team, performing their haka prior to their match against the United States at Subaru Park in 2013

Subaru Park hosted its first rugby union international on November 9, 2013, when the Maori All Blacks squared off against the United States. A sold-out crowd of 18,500 witnessed a hard-fought match in which the visiting Maori All Blacks won 29–19.

== Other sports ==
=== College football ===
The first college football game played at Subaru Park was the Battle of the Blue on November 19, 2011, in which Delaware beat Villanova to earn the trophy for the first time. These same two teams met again on November 23, 2013, with Villanova beating Delaware 35–34.

=== Lacrosse ===
The stadium hosted two quarterfinal matches in the 2012 NCAA Division I Men's Lacrosse Championship. In 2013, the stadium hosted the Major League Lacrosse's Championship known as the Steinfeld Cup. In this game, the Chesapeake Bayhawks defeated the Charlotte Hounds 10–9 in front of 3,892 fans. On April 24 & 26, 2015, the 2015 ACC Lacrosse Championship was hosted at the facility. In 2015, the stadium hosted the NCAA Division I and Division III Women's Lacrosse Championship. Maryland beat North Carolina in the DI game while SUNY Cortland beat Trinity College of Hartford in the DIII game. In 2016, the stadium again hosted the NCAA Division I and Division III Women's Lacrosse Championship, May 28 and May 29, 2016.

At the high school level, notable events included the boys' 2015 Inter-Academic League Championship game, between The Haverford School, from Pennsylvania, and The Hun School of New Jersey. The Haverford School won the game, as well as the Inter-Ac title, capping off a perfect 23–0 season.

From 2019 to 2023, the Premier Lacrosse League hosted several matches at Subaru Park.

=== Ultimate ===
Major League Ultimate had hosted two of its annual championship games at Subaru Park. The first was on July 19, 2014, when the DC Current defeated the Vancouver Nighthawks 23–17. The stadium again hosted the championship on August 8, 2015, in which the Boston Whitecaps defeated the Seattle Rainmakers 31–17.

=== Other soccer uses ===
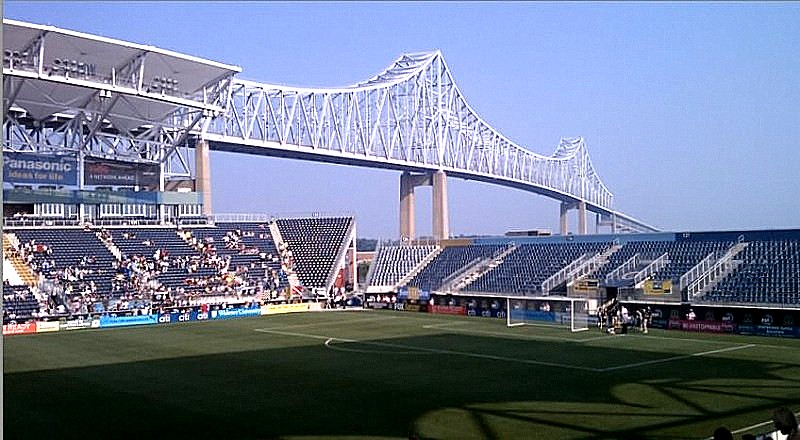
Subaru Park before the semi-final game between Philadelphia Independence and magicJack in 2010, the Independence's final home game ever

The United States Military Academy at West Point, New York, and the United States Naval Academy in Annapolis, Maryland, have played their annual men's soccer rivalry, called the Army–Navy Cup at Subaru Park. The 2012 meeting marked just the third time in the 75-year history of the soccer rivalry that the schools met at a neutral location and was the first regular-season neutral site meeting, with the previous two occurring in the NCAA tournament. Philadelphia is the traditional home of the classic football rivalry and is halfway between the two schools. 3,672 turned out for the first Philadelphia matchup.

After Hurricane Sandy, the 2012 Big East Men's Soccer Tournament was moved to Subaru Park from Red Bull Arena. Subaru Park served as host again in 2013 for the restructured conference's tournament. The stadium also hosted an international friendly between Greece and Nigeria in 2014. The match was a scoreless draw.

The 2013 College Cup was held at Subaru Park and the tournament returned to the venue in 2017. The first set of matches of the 2017 SheBelieves Cup was played at the stadium, in which France beat England and the United States beat Germany.

=== Drum and bugle corps ===
Given its ability to be used as a football field, Subaru Park has recently been used as an annual site for the Drum Corps International Summer Competition Tour.

== Features ==
When the initial architectural drawings were revealed, the stadium was to have been an oval-shaped stadium with a cantilevered roof covering all seating areas – not unlike most European football grounds. After consulting with the nascent club's supporters, the Union's ownership group, Keystone Sports & Entertainment, re-designed a specific entrance for the Sons of Ben supporters group in recognition of their loyalty. This entrance leads into a 2,000-seat section at the southeast end of the stadium reserved specifically for the group known as The River End. Cantilevered roofs run above the Main and Bridge Stands and were designed to protect fans from the elements without obstructing the view of the Commodore Barry Bridge and the Delaware River from their seats. The exterior façade is made up of brick and natural stone, a continuity of traditional Philadelphia architecture. Additional features include thirty luxury suites, a full-service restaurant and club above the Chester End, and a built-in concert stage in The River End (which has yet to be used).

In February 2020, as part of Subaru of America becoming the naming rights holder for the stadium, the Union replaced the previous video board above the Chester End with a new 3,440 sq ft (320 m^{2}) high dynamic range (HDR) video board that was the first of its kind in an MLS soccer-specific stadium. The LED ribbon boards around the field and seating bowl were also upgraded. A new VIP premium area called the "Tunnel Club" opened for the 2020 season as well. The area outside the stadium known as "Subaru Plaza" was expanded to facilitate pregame festivities and a new community garden to grow fruits and vegetables for the local community.

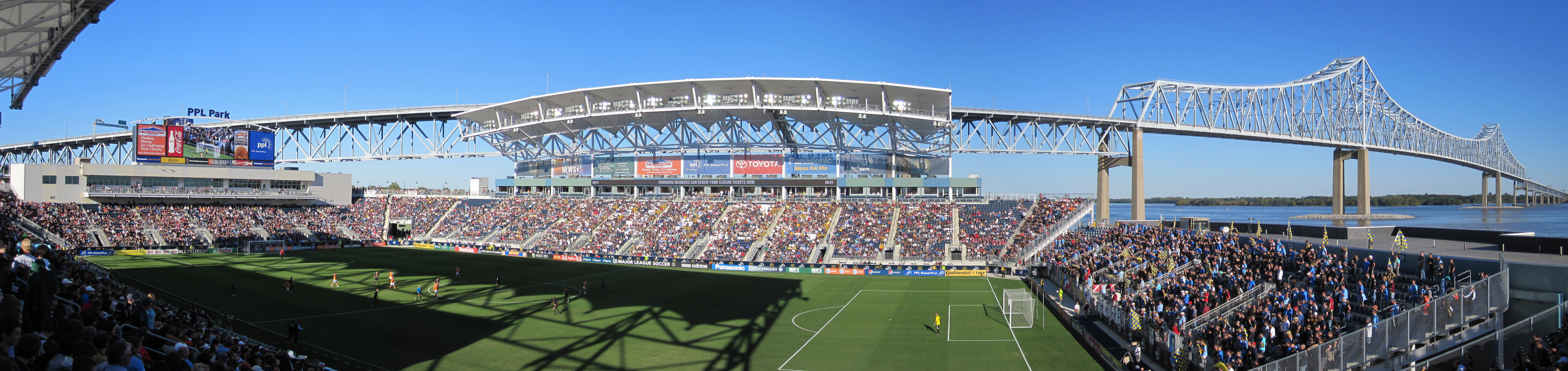
View of the interior of Subaru Park, from the southwest corner of the Main Stand facing the Bridge Stand and the Commodore Barry Bridge in 2010. To the left is the Chester End and the right The River End, which is separate from the rest of the stadium.

== Sponsors ==
Logos as PPL Park and Talen Energy Stadium

On February 25, 2010, the Philadelphia Union announced that the Allentown-based PPL Corporation purchased the naming rights to its home venue for $20 million over 11 years. As part of the deal, PPL EnergyPlus provides the stadium with sustainable energy derived from other sources in Pennsylvania.

The Panasonic Corporation provides broadcast and television production systems, large-screen LED displays, security systems, and point-of-sale systems.

On November 30, 2015, Talen Energy assumed naming rights and energy supply of the stadium. Talen Energy spun off as an electricity producer from PPL which in turn concentrated on transmission and distribution aspects.

On February 18, 2020, Subaru of America, whose headquarters are in Philadelphia's neighboring city Camden, New Jersey, was announced as the new naming rights holder for the stadium.

== Awards ==
In September 2010, Mid-Atlantic Construction Magazine named the stadium the "Sports/Recreation Project of the Year." The company grants the award to premier construction projects in the Mid-Atlantic region. In February 2011, the Delaware County Planning Commission awarded the stadium the 2010 William H. Bates Memorial Award. Since 1980, the honor is presented annually to real-estate developers that improved a Delaware County property.

== Concessions ==
Subaru Park features many of the foods commonly sold at American sports venues, and also offers traditional Philadelphia food items such as cheesesteaks, hoagies, and soft pretzels (shaped like the Union's primary logo). Several foods are provided by local companies such as Turkey Hill, Herr's and Seasons Pizza, while beers from local breweries such as Victory and Dogfish Head are also available.

== Transportation ==
Like the South Philadelphia Sports Complex, the stadium is located near Interstate 95. It is approximately 1 mile (1.6 km) from the Chester Transit Center SEPTA station, where shuttle service is provided from four hours prior to kickoff and from full-time until the park is empty. Philadelphia International Airport is 5 miles (8.0 km) away. Proposals to improve transit service to Highland Avenue station on the SEPTA Wilmington Line or build a new station closer to the stadium are under consideration as part of the stadium's expansion plan.

== See also ==
- Lists of stadiums
- List of soccer stadiums in the United States

Preceded by Regions Park; BBVA Compass Stadium	Host of the College Cup; 2013; 2017	Succeeded by WakeMed Soccer Park; Harder Stadium
