= Chester Creek Branch =

Railway line in Pennsylvania

Map

The Chester Creek Branch was a 7.25-mile (11.67 km) railroad line that operated in southern Delaware County, Pennsylvania, from 1869 to 1972.

Built by the Chester Creek Railroad, it was originally operated and leased by the Philadelphia and Baltimore Central Railroad, then by a subsidiary of the Pennsylvania Railroad, and finally, for a few years, by PRR successor Penn Central. It connected the Lamokin Street station in Chester to Lenni station in Middletown Township.

The branch diverged from the Northeast Corridor main line near SEPTA's now-defunct Lamokin Street station. At Lenni, the branch merged with the West Chester Branch, a portion of which is used by the SEPTA Media/Wawa Line.

== History ==
The rail line was built by the Chester Creek Railroad, which was chartered in 1866 and began service in 1869. Its route paralleled Chester Creek from Lenni (at a junction with the West Chester and Philadelphia Railroad (WC&P)) southeast to Upland, where it veered south, ending at Lamokin Street and a junction with the Philadelphia, Wilmington and Baltimore Railroad (PW&B). The Chester Creek line was operated and leased by the Philadelphia and Baltimore Central Railroad (owner of the WC&P), which owned the locomotives and rolling stock.

In 1916, the Pennsylvania Railroad took control of the line as well as the rest of the P&BC through its subsidiary, the Philadelphia, Baltimore and Washington Railroad (successor to the PW&B). In 1941, the branch had these stations:

Locality	Milepost	Station	Lat/long	Notes/Connections
Lenni	0.0	Lenni	39.8942°N 75.4486°W	Currently used as a SEPTA training base; has a passing siding. Station demolished.
Lenni	West Chester & Chester Creek Branches split			
Lenni		Rockdale		
Chester Twp.		Bridgewater		
Upland		Upland		
Lamokin Run Branch & Chester Creek Branches split
Chester (City)	7.25	Lamokin Street	39.8420°N 75.3756°W	Closed by SEPTA in 2003
Line abandoned in 1972

The branch became part of Penn Central (PC) in 1968, when the PRR merged with its longtime rival, the New York Central Railroad.

The Chester Creek Branch and the Octoraro Branch were damaged by a flash flood in September 1971, then hit again the following year by Hurricane Agnes. This spelled the end of service on the line, because the PC, which had declared bankruptcy in 1970, chose not to repair it.

When the PC was taken over by Conrail, the defunct line was excluded. In the late 1970s, the line was deeded to the Southeastern Pennsylvania Transportation Authority (SEPTA) by a PC holding company named American Premier Underwriters. SEPTA, which took control of all commuter rail services in the Philadelphia area in 1983, chose not to repair the line. Friends of the Chester Creek Trail purchased the line from SEPTA on a 30 year lease. Delaware County took over the trail in recent years.

== Rail trail ==
As of 2009, 90 percent of the line was intact. In 2005, SEPTA leased it for 30 years to Friends of the Chester Creek Branch, a local group that has proposed to convert the line into a rail trail called the Chester Creek Trail between the dormant Lenni Station and the town of Upland. In 2010, government grants were awarded for the first phase of the trail project. SEPTA continues to own the line but has no plans to restore rail service.

Friends of the Chester Creek Branch received funding and approval for construction of a 2.8 mile segment of a rail trail, which was completed in late 2016. Design work is expected to begin on a section expanding the trail further into Aston in 2017.

A ribbon cutting ceremony for Phase I was held on April 8, 2017, and Delaware County is now moving ahead with expanding the trail further.

== See also ==
- Lamokin Tower (at junction with Northeast Corridor)
- List of defunct Pennsylvania railroads
- SEPTA Regional Rail
