= Bell Tower (Pennsylvania Railroad) =

Hook Tower

Coordinates: 39°49′25.4″N 75°24′52.7″W

HOOK Tower is a closed interlocking tower on the Pennsylvania Railroad in Marcus Hook, Pennsylvania.

== History ==
Hook Tower was built by the Pennsylvania Railroad to control the main line and the Chester and Delaware River Railroad. This railroad line saw freight train service provided by the PRR after PRR assumed operations of the Chester & Delaware River. In fact, it was still in use after the PRR electrified the Northeast Corridor. In 1968 when the Pennsy merged with the New York Central to form Penn Central, PC kept using the tower. In 1976, the government freight railroad: the Consolidated Rail Corporation, better known as Conrail, assumed operations from the bankrupt Penn Central, which had gone bankrupt in 1970. In the Conrail years, Hook Tower was closed down. In 1999, when Conrail was split into CSX Transportation and the Norfolk Southern Railway, NS got the tower and the Chester and Delaware River line.

== Today ==
Hook Tower still stands today. With the NEC used only by a few Norfolk Southern local services, SEPTA's Wilmington/Newark Line train and Amtrak, it is unlikely Hook will open up again any time soon.

== See also ==
- SEPTA Regional Rail
- Marcus Hook (SEPTA station)
