= Marcus Hook station =

Railway station in Marcus Hook, Pennsylvania

Marcus Hook
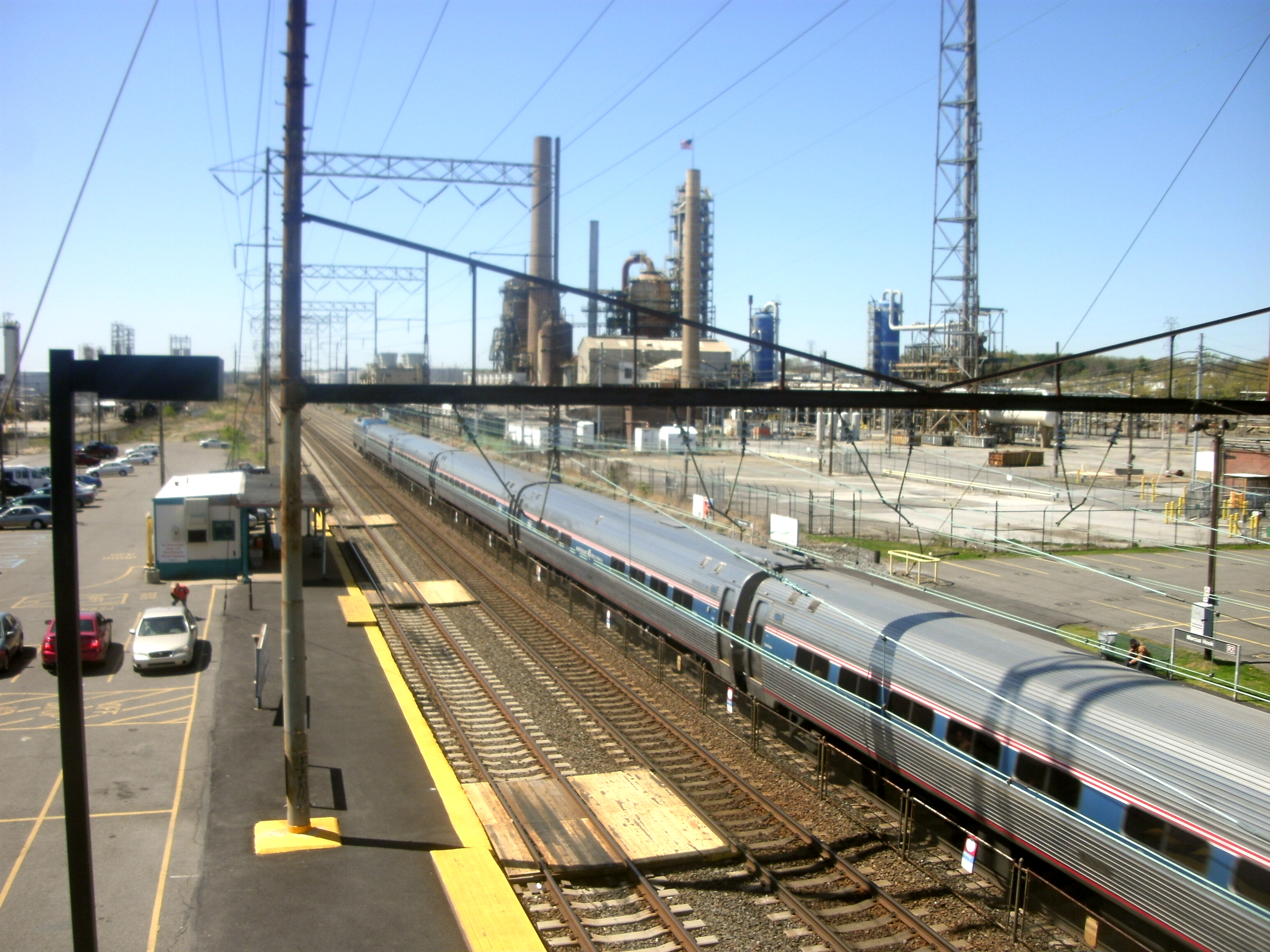
- A Northeast Regional train passes through the Marcus Hook station, heading south towards Delaware as seen from the overpass on PA 452 in April 2012.

General information
- Location: 20 West 12th Street; Marcus Hook, Pennsylvania, U.S.
- Coordinates: 39°49′17″N 75°25′11″W
- Owner: SEPTA
- Line: Amtrak Northeast Corridor
- Platforms: 2 side platforms
- Tracks: 4
- Connections: SEPTA Suburban Bus: 119

Construction
- Parking: 202 spaces
- Cycle facilities: 2 rack spaces
- Accessible: No

Other information
- Fare zone: 3

History
- Opened: 1877
- Rebuilt: 1893
- Electrified: 1928
- Former names: Linwood

Key dates
- 1964: 1893 station depot razed

Passengers
- 2017: 548 boardings, 573 alightings (weekday average)
- Rank: 44 of 146

Services
Preceding station	SEPTA	Following station
Claymont toward Newark	Wilmington/Newark Line	Highland Avenue toward Temple University
Former services
Preceding station	Pennsylvania Railroad	Following station
Edge Moor toward Washington, D.C.	Philadelphia, Wilmington and Baltimore Railroad	Lamokin Street toward Philadelphia
Naaman toward Wilmington	Wilmington Line	Highland Avenue toward Suburban Station
Location

Marcus Hook is an active commuter railroad station in the eponymous borough of Marcus Hook, Delaware County, Pennsylvania. Located on West 12th Street and Morton Avenue in the shadow of Market Street (State Route 452), Marcus Hook station serves trains of SEPTA's Wilmington/Newark Line between Center City, Philadelphia and the line's namesake termini in Delaware. Some trains on the line terminate at Marcus Hook rather than continue southwest. Amtrak's Northeast Corridor services bypass the station. The station consists of two low-level side platforms with stairs that access Market Street. A trailer on the inbound platform serves as a ticket office on weekend mornings. Marcus Hook station has 240 spaces available for commuters to use.

Marcus Hook station was originally built by the Pennsylvania Railroad in 1875, replaced in 1893. That station depot was razed in February 1963. Two other Baltimore and Ohio Railroad stations also used to exist in the Borough.

== Station layout ==
Marcus Hook has two low-level side platforms with walkways connecting passengers to the inner tracks. Amtrak trains bypass the station via the inner tracks.

== See also ==
- Bell Tower (Pennsylvania Railroad)
