= Claymont station =

Railway station in Claymont, Delaware, US

Claymont
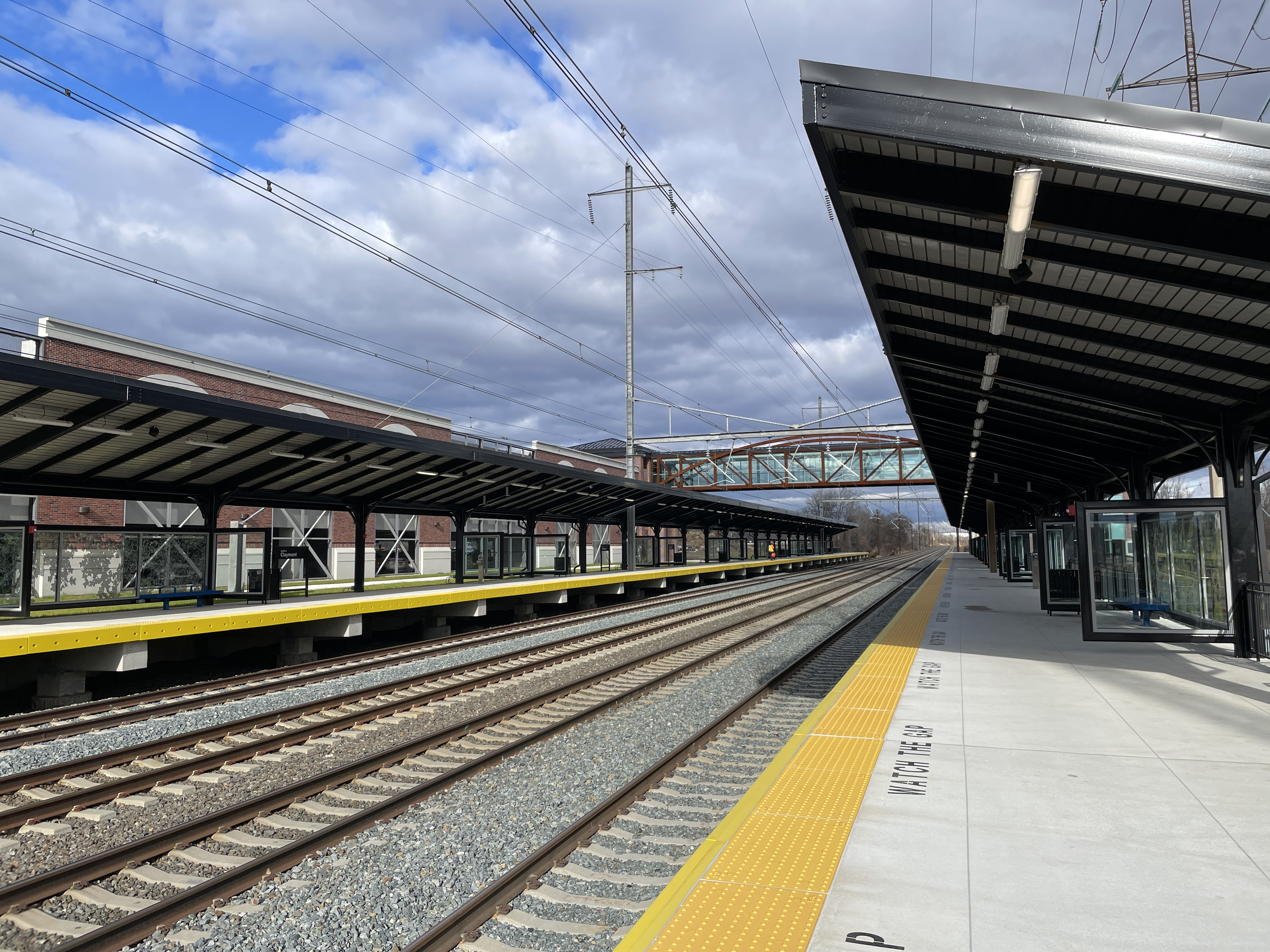
- Claymont station in December 2023

General information
- Location: 4500 Philadelphia Pike; Claymont, Delaware
- Coordinates: 39°48′15″N 75°26′46″W
- Owner: DART First State
- Line: Amtrak Northeast Corridor
- Platforms: 2 side platforms
- Tracks: 4
- Connections: DART First State: 13, 61; SEPTA Suburban Bus: 113

Construction
- Parking: 807 spaces
- Cycle facilities: 9 rack spaces
- Accessible: Yes

Other information
- Fare zone: 4

History
- Opened: October 29, 1990 (SEPTA)
- Closed: 1983–1990
- Rebuilt: 2023

Passengers
- 2017: 534 boardings, 608 alightings (weekday average)
- Rank: 45 of 146

Services
Preceding station	SEPTA	Following station
Wilmington toward Newark	Wilmington/Newark Line	Marcus Hook toward Temple University
Former services
Preceding station	Pennsylvania Railroad	Following station
Edge Moor toward Wilmington	Wilmington Line	Naaman toward Suburban Station
Location

Claymont station (also known as Claymont Transportation Center and Harris B. McDowell III Transportation Center) is a station on the Northeast Corridor in Claymont, Delaware. Claymont has two high-level side platforms with a pedestrian bridge over the tracks. It is served by SEPTA Wilmington/Newark Line local service; Amtrak intercity services bypass the station via the inner tracks. The station is the northernmost stop in Delaware, continuing towards Wilmington and Newark. It has a parking garage with 464 spaces and an outdoor parking lot with 343 spaces.

== History ==
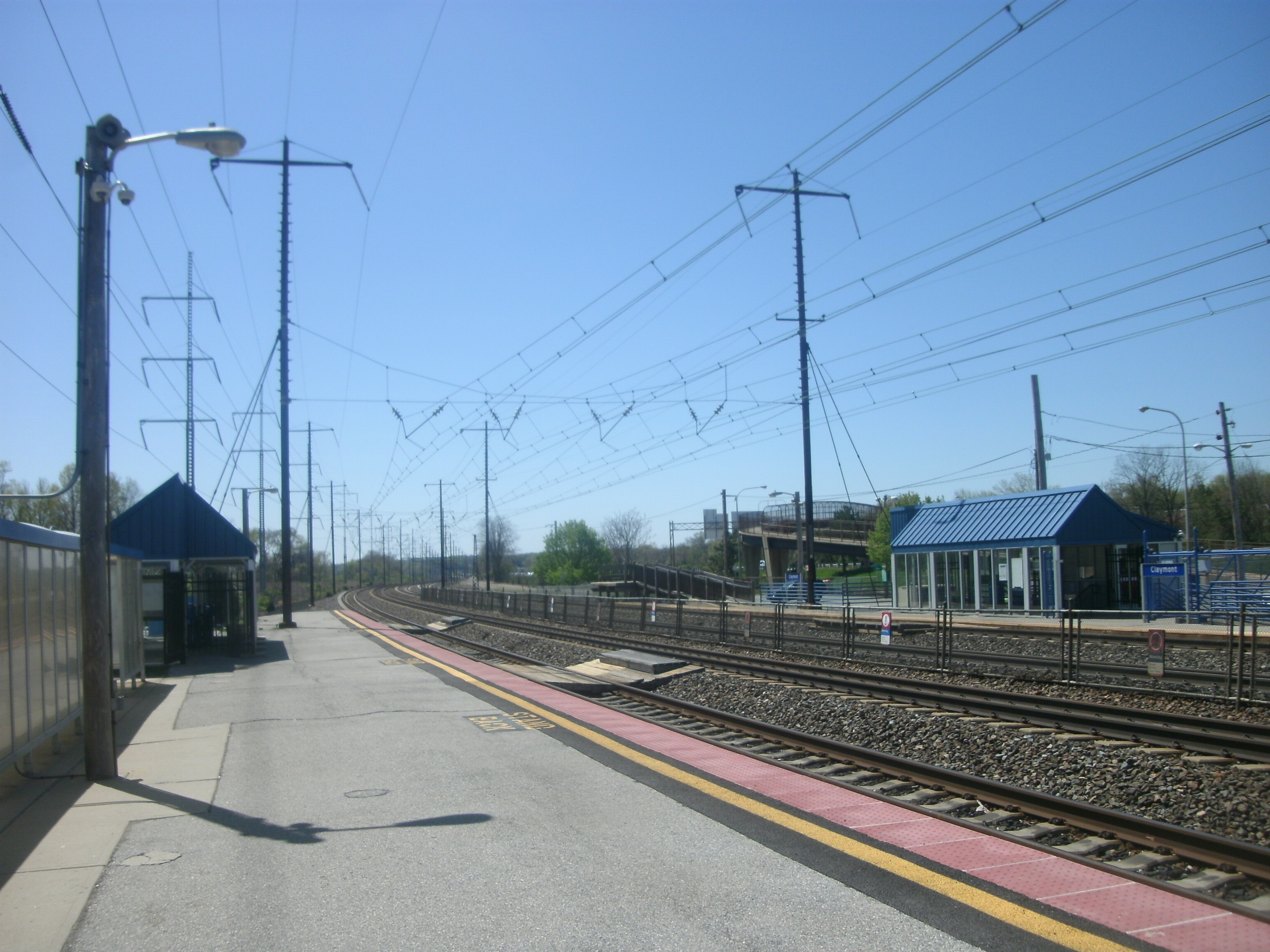
The former Claymont station in April 2012

Claymont station was originally built by the Pennsylvania Railroad as a commuter rail stop between Philadelphia and Wilmington. Service passed on to the Penn Central Railroad in 1968 and Conrail in 1976. The former eastbound depot, built by the Pennsylvania Railroad, burned on July 25, 1981. The gutted frame of the eastbound structure suffered two more fires following the 1981 fire. A fire on the morning of January 6, 1986 eliminated the remaining standing structure. When SEPTA took over service from Conrail on January 1, 1983, Claymont station was closed as service in Delaware was eliminated. Claymont station reopened to SEPTA service on October 29, 1990, with retrofitted bus shelters constructed at the station.

The former Claymont station at Myrtle and Marion avenues was replaced with the Claymont Regional Transportation Center. The new station is located 1/2 mile (0.80 km) north of the former station at the former site of Evraz Claymont Steel, which is being redeveloped into a mixed-use office, commercial, and light industrial development, and will have connections to area roads, public transportation, and pedestrian and bicycle facilities. Plans for the new station date back to 2005. On July 29, 2016, the Claymont Regional Transportation Center received a $10 million Transportation Investment Generating Economic Recovery (TIGER) grant from the U.S. Department of Transportation.

Construction on the Claymont Regional Transportation Center began in spring 2019. The new station cost $90 million to build. The Claymont Regional Transportation Center, which was dedicated in honor of former State Senator Harris McDowell III in 2022, features two high-level side platforms with a pedestrian bridge over the tracks, a parking garage with 464 spaces, an outdoor parking lot with 343 spaces, and electric vehicle charging stations. A ribbon-cutting ceremony for the new station was held on November 27, 2023, with transportation officials, the state's congressional delegation, and station namesake Harris McDowell III in attendance. The Claymont Regional Transportation Center opened for train and bus service on December 4, 2023.
