= Wilmington/Newark Line =

SEPTA Regional Rail service

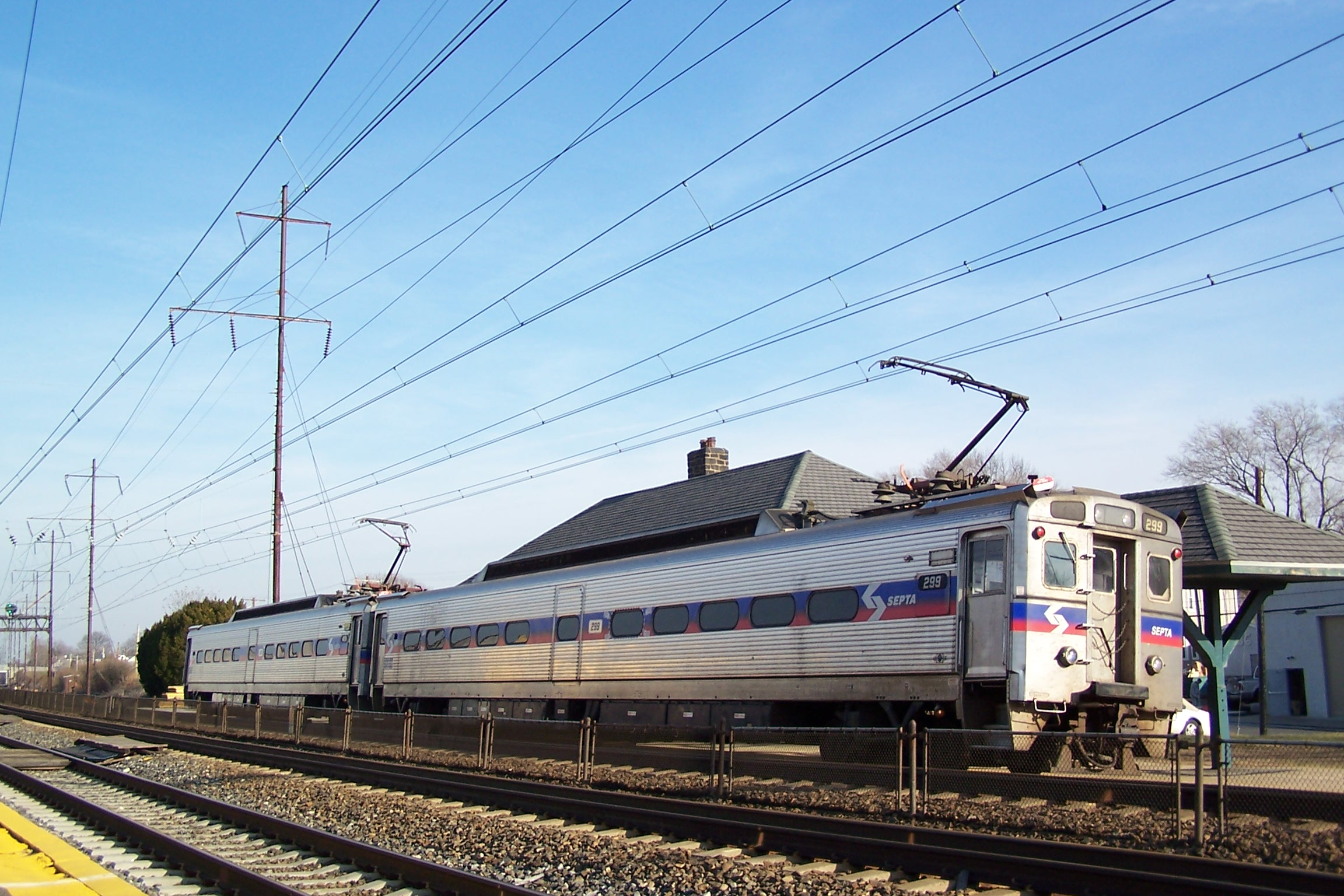
- A 2-car Silverliner IV train seen at Prospect Park station

Overview
- Termini: Newark; Temple University
- Stations: 22
- Website: septa.org

Service
- Type: Commuter rail
- System: SEPTA Regional Rail
- Operator: SEPTA Regional Rail
- Rolling stock: Electric Multiple Units, push-pull trains
- Daily ridership: 5,173 (FY 2025)

Technical
- Track gauge: 4 ft 8 1/2 in (1,435 mm) standard gauge
- Electrification: Overhead line, 12 kV 25 Hz AC
Route map
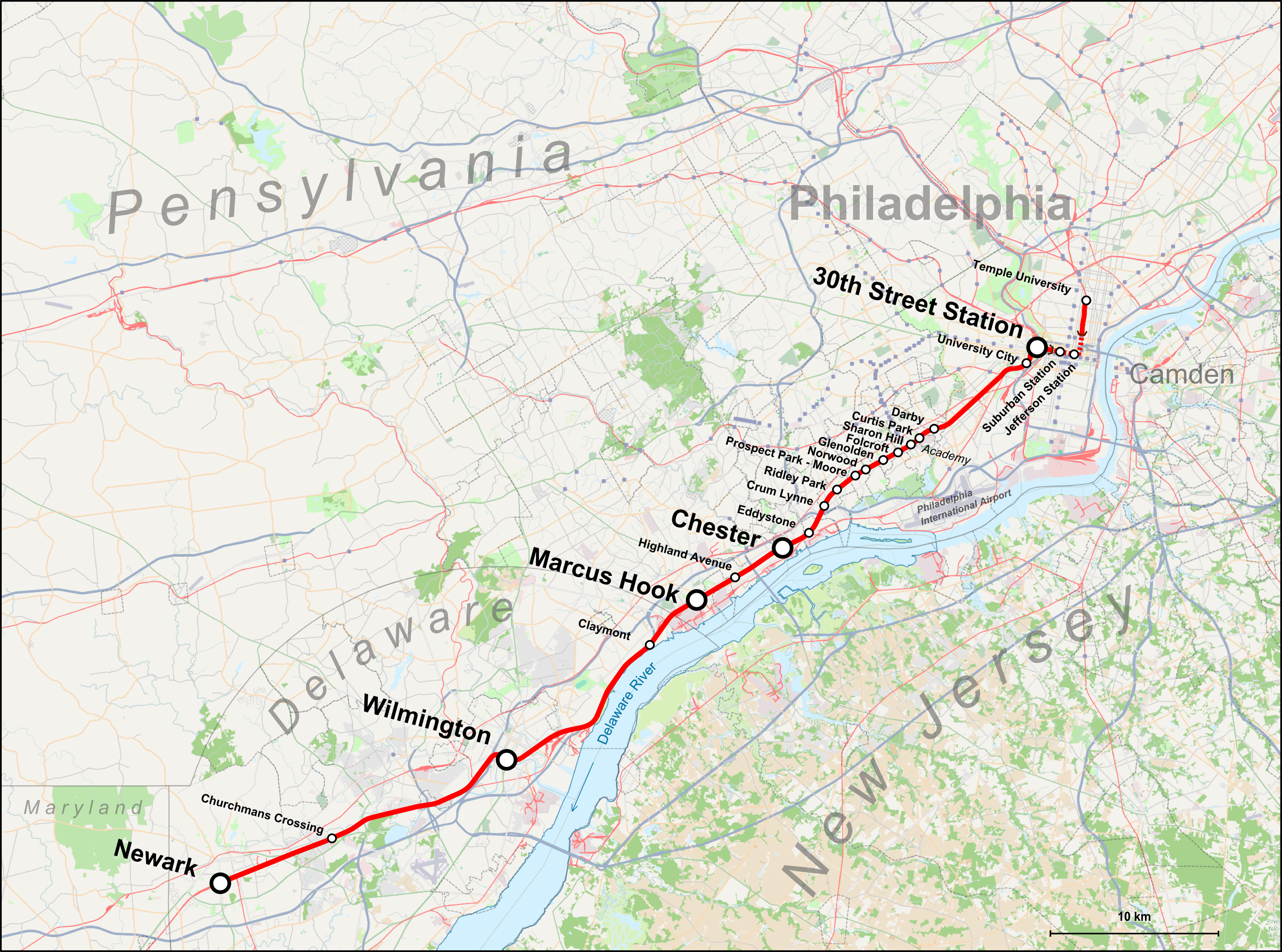

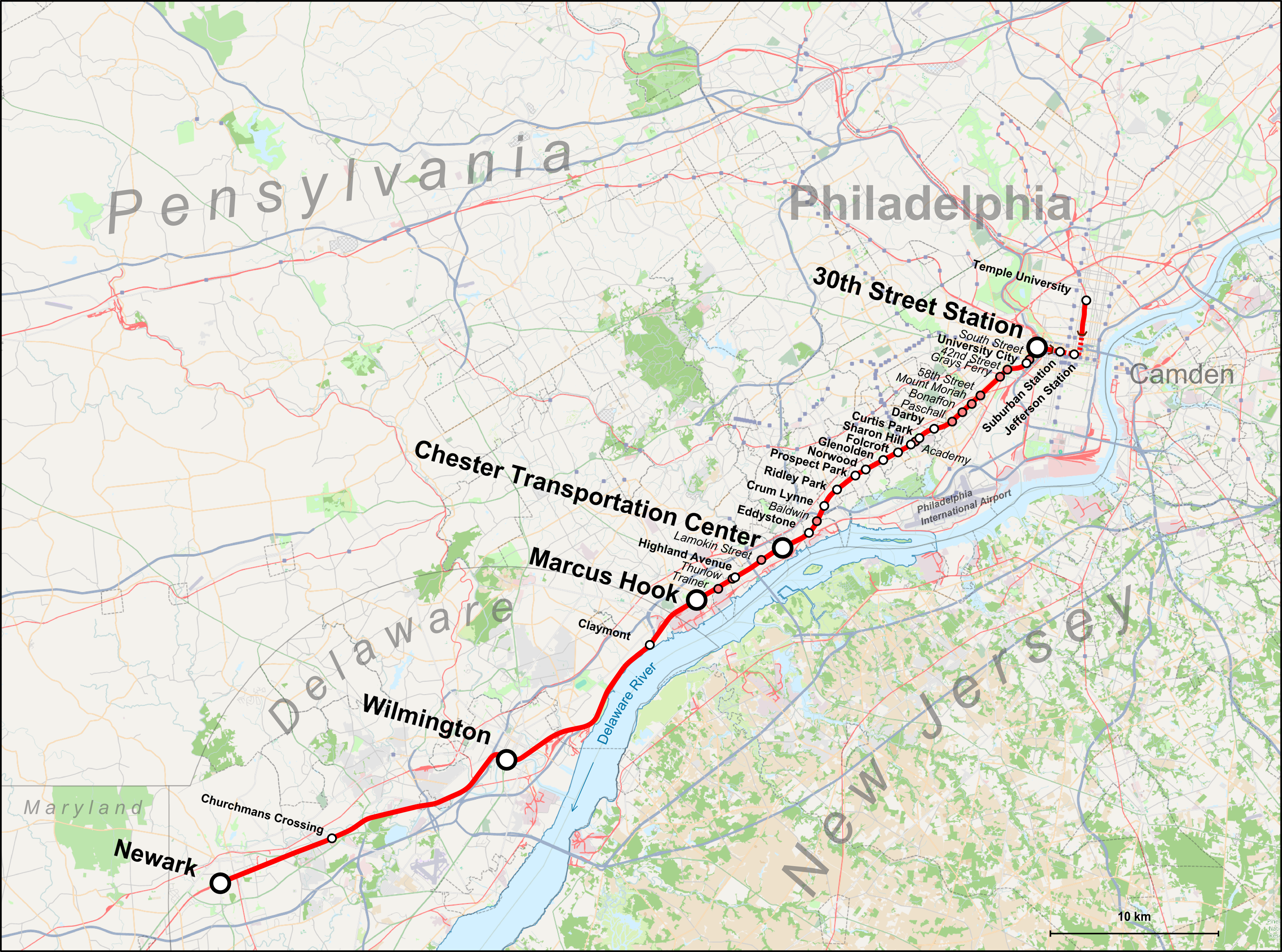

The Wilmington/Newark Line is a route of the SEPTA Regional Rail commuter rail system in the Philadelphia area. The line serves southeastern Pennsylvania and northern Delaware, with stations in Marcus Hook, Pennsylvania, Wilmington, Delaware, and Newark, Delaware. It is the longest of the 13 SEPTA Regional Rail lines.

== Route ==
The Wilmington/Newark Line runs on Amtrak's Northeast Corridor, making local stops along the way.

Only weekday peak trains run to Newark. All trains on weekends terminate at Wilmington. Service in Delaware is funded in part by the Delaware Department of Transportation (DelDOT).

As of 2026, most weekday Wilmington/Newark trains operate through the Center City tunnel to and from Temple University station. All weekend Wilmington trains run through to and from Chestnut Hill East on the Chestnut Hill East Line.

== History ==
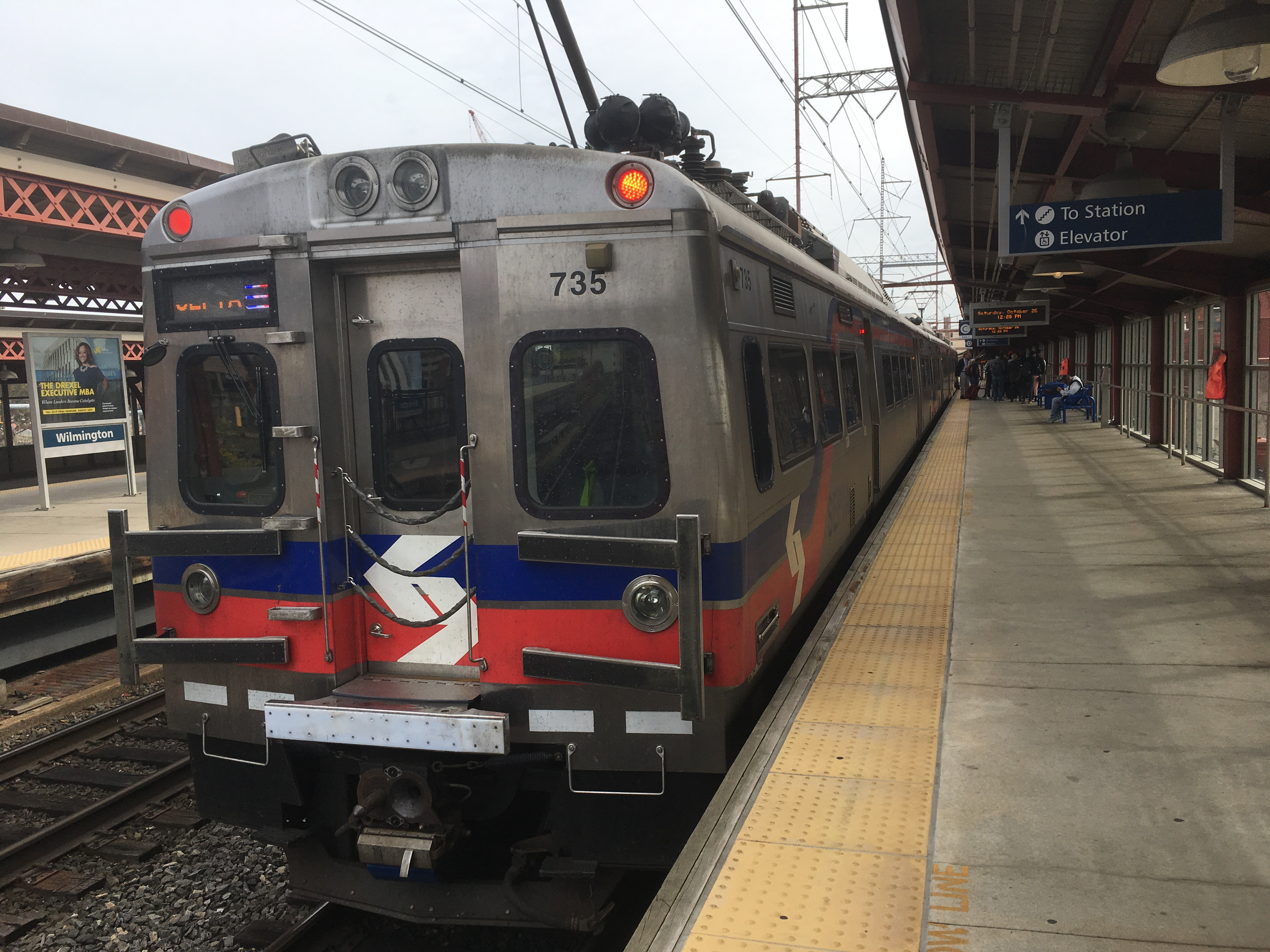
Silverliner V SEPTA Regional Rail train at Wilmington station

The line north of Wilmington was originally built by the Philadelphia, Wilmington and Baltimore Railroad. The original alignment was opened January 17, 1838, and on November 18, 1872, a realignment opened north of Chester (part of the old route is now used for the Airport Line). South of Wilmington the line was built by the Wilmington and Susquehanna Railroad and opened July 31, 1837. The Pennsylvania Railroad obtained control in the early 1880s. Electrified service was opened between Philadelphia and Wilmington on September 30, 1928. Electrified operation was extended to Newark and beyond to Washington, D.C., on February 10, 1935. In 1968, the Pennsylvania Railroad merged into Penn Central. In 1976 Conrail took over, and SEPTA took over on January 1, 1983. When SEPTA took over service, commuter rail service in Delaware was eliminated, with the Claymont and Edgemoor stations closed.

Under SEPTA, commuter service from Philadelphia originally terminated in Marcus Hook. On January 16, 1989, service was extended south into Delaware to end at Wilmington. A stop was added in Claymont in 1991. In the mid-1990s, a transportation study took place for extending SEPTA service from Wilmington to Newark. The proposal called for stations at Newport (near the former Newport Pennsylvania Railroad station), Metroform (now Churchmans Crossing), Newark, and West Newark (at Otts Chapel Road). A review by DelDOT challenged the locations of the stations in Newport, Newark, and West Newark. SEPTA service was extended south from Wilmington to Newark September 2, 1997. The Churchmans Crossing station between Wilmington and Newark opened in 2000.

On July 25, 2010, SEPTA renamed the service from the R2 Newark to the Wilmington/Newark Line as part of system-wide service change that drops the R-number naming and makes the Center City stations the terminus for all lines. This also ended the combined R2 Newark/R2 Warminster service.

SEPTA activated positive train control on the Wilmington/Newark Line on May 1, 2017.

On April 9, 2020, service on the line was suspended due to the COVID-19 pandemic, though Penn Medicine Station was still being served by other rail services. Service between 30th Street Station and Wilmington resumed May 10, 2020 on a modified schedule as part of the Southwest Connection Improvement Program. Service to Newark resumed on January 25, 2021, in order to offer public transit options during a construction project along Interstate 95 in Wilmington. Previously, Amtrak announced the completion of the Delaware Third Rail Project in December 2020. The project installed the third track between Wilmington and Newark that would increase the capacity.

== Station list ==
The Wilmington/Newark Line trains make the following station stops, after leaving the Center City Commuter Connection:

State	Zone	Location	Station	Miles (km) from Center City	Opened	Closed	Connections / notes
PA	CC	University City, Philadelphia	Penn Medicine Station	1.8 (2.9)	April 24, 1995		SEPTA Regional Rail: SEPTA City Bus: 40, LUCY
PA	2	Darby	Darby	6.1 (9.8)	November 18, 1872		
PA	2	Sharon Hill	Curtis Park	6.8 (10.9)	March 7, 1949		SEPTA Suburban Bus: 115
PA	2	Sharon Hill	Academy			March 7, 1949	Closed when the replacement station at Curtis Park opened for workers of the Curtis Publishing Company.
PA	2	Sharon Hill	Sharon Hill	7.2 (11.6)	November 18, 1872		SEPTA Suburban Bus: 115
PA	2	Folcroft	Folcroft	7.7 (12.4)			SEPTA Suburban Bus: 115
PA	2	Glenolden	Glenolden	8.3 (13.4)	November 18, 1872		
PA	2	Norwood	Norwood	9.0 (14.5)			
PA	2	Prospect Park	Prospect Park	9.5 (15.3)			Known as Moore until April 1, 1932
PA	3	Ridley Park	Ridley Park	10.4 (16.7)	November 18, 1872		
PA	3	Ridley Park	Crum Lynne	11.2 (18.0)	November 18, 1872		SEPTA Suburban Bus: 114
PA	3	Eddystone					
PA	3	Eddystone	Baldwin			October 4, 1981	
PA	3	Eddystone	Eddystone	12.3 (19.8)	November 18, 1872		SEPTA City Bus: 37
PA	3	Chester	Chester T.C.	13.4 (21.6)			SEPTA City Bus: 37; SEPTA Suburban Bus: 109, 113, 114, 117, 118, 119
PA	3	Chester	Lamokin Street		November 18, 1872	July 1, 2003	
PA	3	Chester	Highland Avenue	15.5 (24.9)			SEPTA Suburban Bus: 113
PA	3	Trainer	Trainer			March 26, 1978	
PA	3	Marcus Hook	Marcus Hook	17.1 (27.5)			SEPTA Suburban Bus: 119
DE	4	Claymont	Naaman			March 26, 1978	
DE	4	Claymont	Claymont	19.6 (31.5)	October 29, 1990		DART First State: 13, 61; SEPTA Suburban Bus: 113
DE	4	Edgemoor	Edge Moor			January 1, 1983	
DE	4	Wilmington	Wilmington	26.8 (43.1)	January 16, 1989		Amtrak: Acela, Cardinal, Carolinian, Crescent, Northeast Regional, Silver Meteor, Vermonter; Greyhound Lines; DART First State: 2, 5, 6, 10, 11, 13, 14, 18, 20, 28, 33, 35, 40, 301, 305 (seasonal)
DE	4	Newark	Churchmans Crossing	32.5 (52.3)	June 29, 2000		DART First State: 64
DE	4	Newark	Newark	38.7 (62.3)	September 2, 1997		Amtrak: Northeast Regional; DART First State: 10, 33, 46, DART Connect; Cecil Transit: 4

== Ridership ==
Between FY 2013-FY 2019 annual ridership on the Wilmington/Newark Line ranged between 2.5 and 2.8 million before collapsing during the COVID-19 pandemic. (Note: Data for individual lines is not available for FY 2020.)

== See also ==
- Bell Tower (Pennsylvania Railroad)
- Lamokin Tower
