= Eddystone station =

Railway station in Eddystone, Pennsylvania

Eddystone
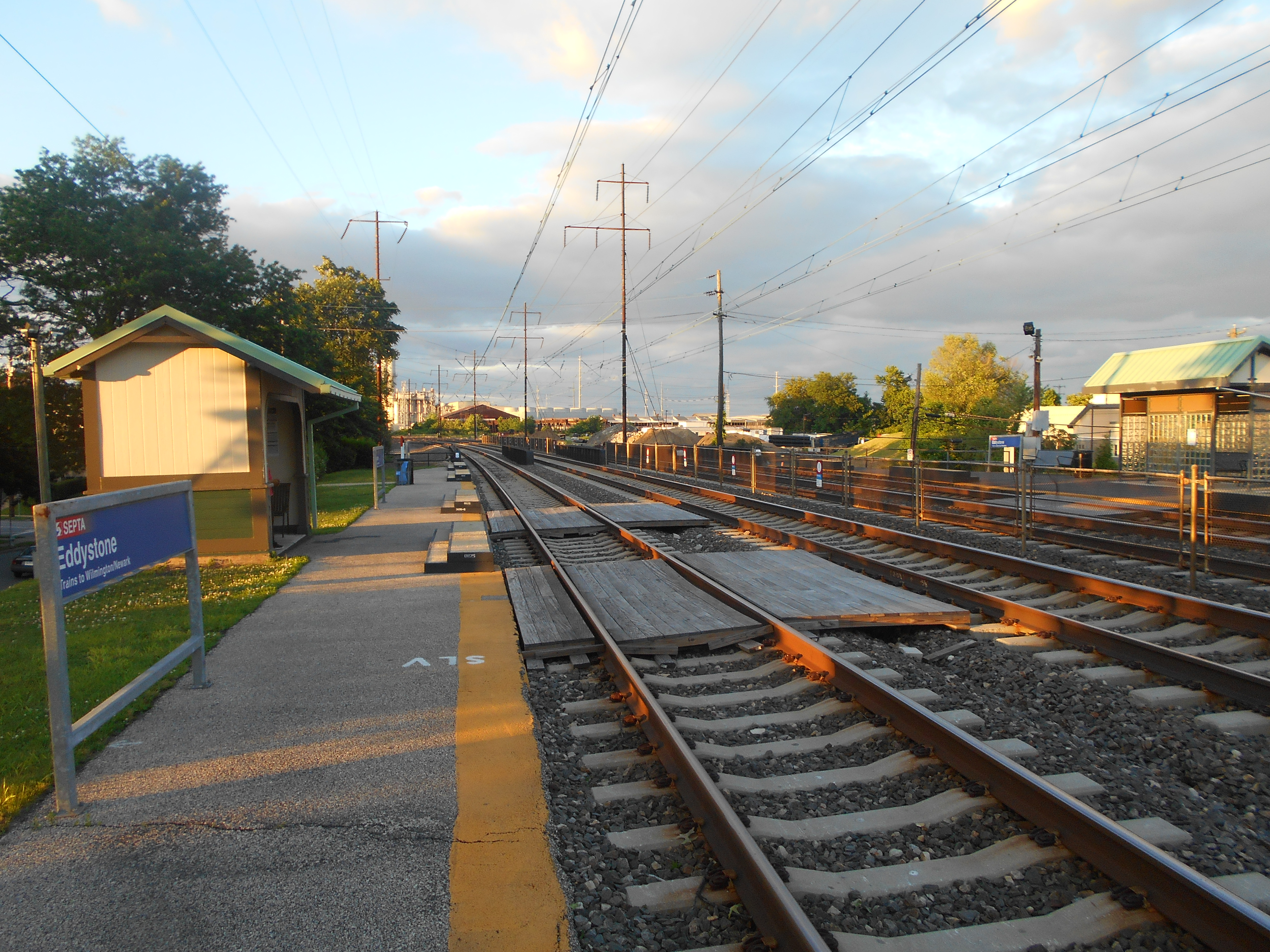
- Eddystone station platform in June 2014.

General information
- Location: 650 Saville Avenue; Eddystone, Pennsylvania, U.S.
- Coordinates: 39°51′26″N 75°20′30″W
- Owner: SEPTA
- Line: Amtrak Northeast Corridor
- Platforms: 2 side platforms
- Tracks: 4
- Connections: SEPTA City Bus: 37

Construction
- Parking: 256 spaces
- Cycle facilities: 5 rack spaces
- Accessible: No

Other information
- Fare zone: 3

History
- Opened: November 18, 1872
- Rebuilt: 1902
- Electrified: 1928

Key dates
- 1962: Station agent eliminated

Services
Preceding station	SEPTA	Following station
Chester toward Newark	Wilmington/Newark Line	Crum Lynne toward Temple University
Former services
Preceding station	Pennsylvania Railroad	Following station
Chester toward Wilmington	Wilmington Line	Baldwin toward Suburban Station
Location

Eddystone station is a station along the SEPTA Wilmington/Newark Line and Amtrak Northeast Corridor. Amtrak does not stop here; only SEPTA serves this station. Eddystone is a borough in Delaware County, Pennsylvania, United States.

The area of Eddystone is rather historic, home to the Baldwin Locomotive Works, which built 100,000+ steam, diesel, and electric locomotives until the mid-1950s. The station, located at Industrial Highway (PA 291) & Saville Avenue, includes a 12-space parking lot. A second platform exists along Seventh Street west of Saville Avenue.

== Station layout ==
Eddystone has two low-level side platforms with walkways connecting passengers to the inner tracks. Amtrak's Northeast Corridor lines bypass the station via the inner tracks.
