= Highland Avenue station (SEPTA) =

Railway station in Pennsylvania, United States

Highland Avenue
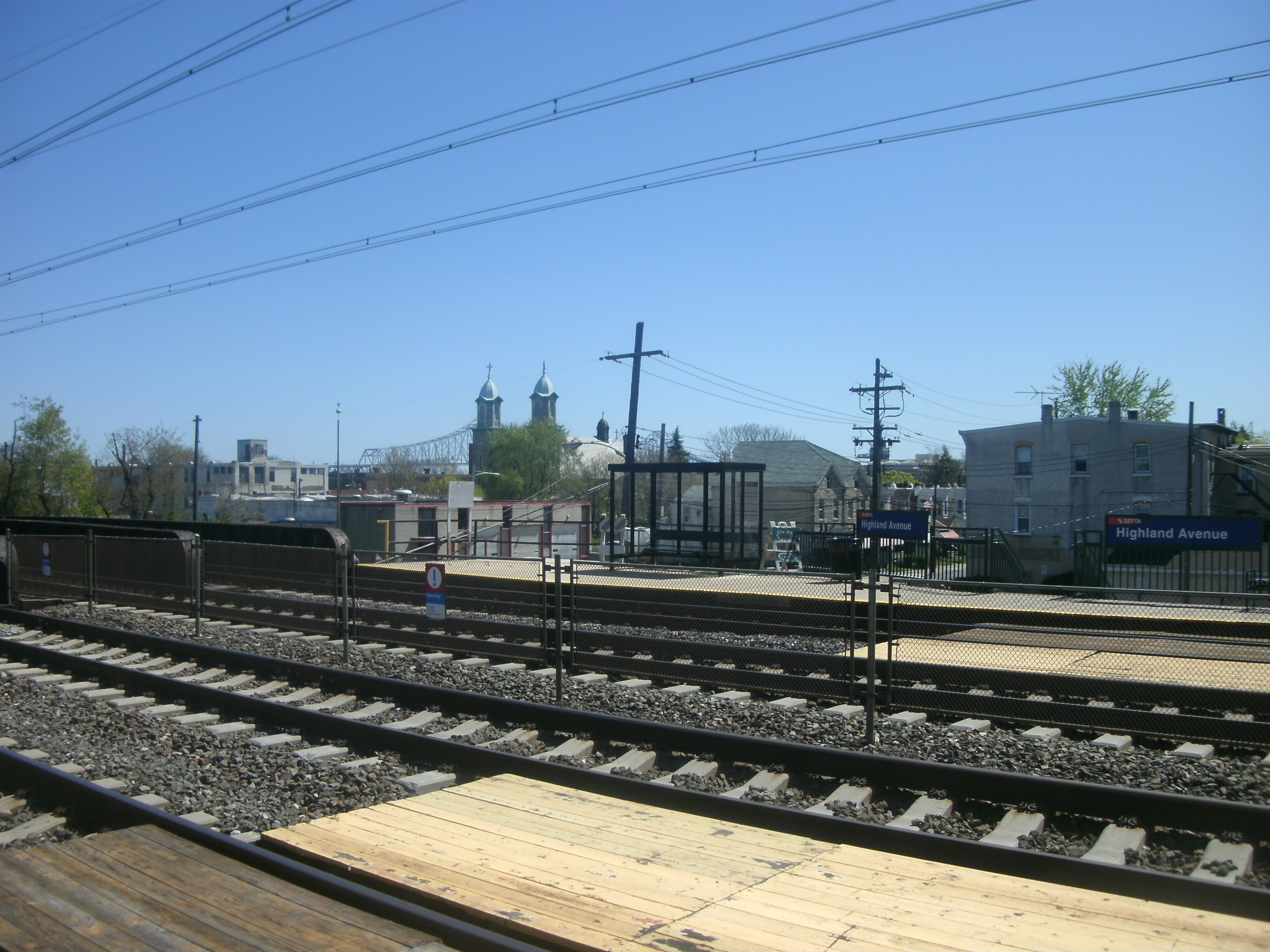
- Highland Avenue station platform in April 2012. The Commodore Barry Bridge is visible in the distance.

General information
- Location: 450 Highland Avenue (U.S. Route 13 Business); Chester, Pennsylvania, U.S.
- Coordinates: 39°50′01″N 75°23′34″W
- Owner: SEPTA
- Line: Amtrak Northeast Corridor
- Platforms: 2 side platforms
- Tracks: 4
- Connections: SEPTA Suburban Bus: 113

Construction
- Parking: 14 spaces
- Cycle facilities: 9 rack spaces
- Accessible: No

Other information
- Fare zone: 3

History
- Electrified: 1928

Services
Preceding station	SEPTA	Following station
Marcus Hook toward Newark	Wilmington/Newark Line	Chester toward Temple University
Former services
Preceding station	Pennsylvania Railroad	Following station
Marcus Hook toward Wilmington	Wilmington Line	Lamokin Street toward Suburban Station
Preceding station	SEPTA	Following station
Marcus Hook toward Newark	Wilmington/Newark Line	Lamokin Street (closed 2003) toward Temple University
Location

Highland Avenue is an active commuter railroad station in the city of Chester, Chester County, Pennsylvania. Located on the namesake Highland Avenue (U.S. Route 13 Business) between West 6th and West 4th Streets, the station serves trains of SEPTA's Wilmington/Newark Line, which operates between Center City, Philadelphia and the two eponymous termini: Wilmington station and Newark station in New Castle County, Delaware. Highland Avenue serves as one of two stations in Chester, the other being the Chester Transit Center at East 6th Street and Avenue of the States. Amtrak's Northeast Corridor services bypass both stations. Highland Avenue station sits in the area of the Commodore Barry Bridge over the Delaware River and Subaru Park, the home stadium for Major League Soccer's Philadelphia Union and its MLS Next Pro team, Philadelphia Union II.

Highland Avenue station consists of two low-level side platforms on the southwest side of the Highland Avenue bridge. The station has limited parking, with fourteen spaces available in a single lot on the inbound side of the tracks.

In 2011, the Delaware Valley Regional Planning Commission studied whether to close Highland Avenue and to replace it with a new station at Engle Street, placing it closer to Subaru Park.

== Station layout ==
Highland Avenue has two low-level wooden side platforms with walkways connecting passengers to the inner tracks. Amtrak's Northeast Corridor lines bypass the station via the inner tracks.
