= Norwood station =

Railway station in Norwood, Pennsylvania

Norwood
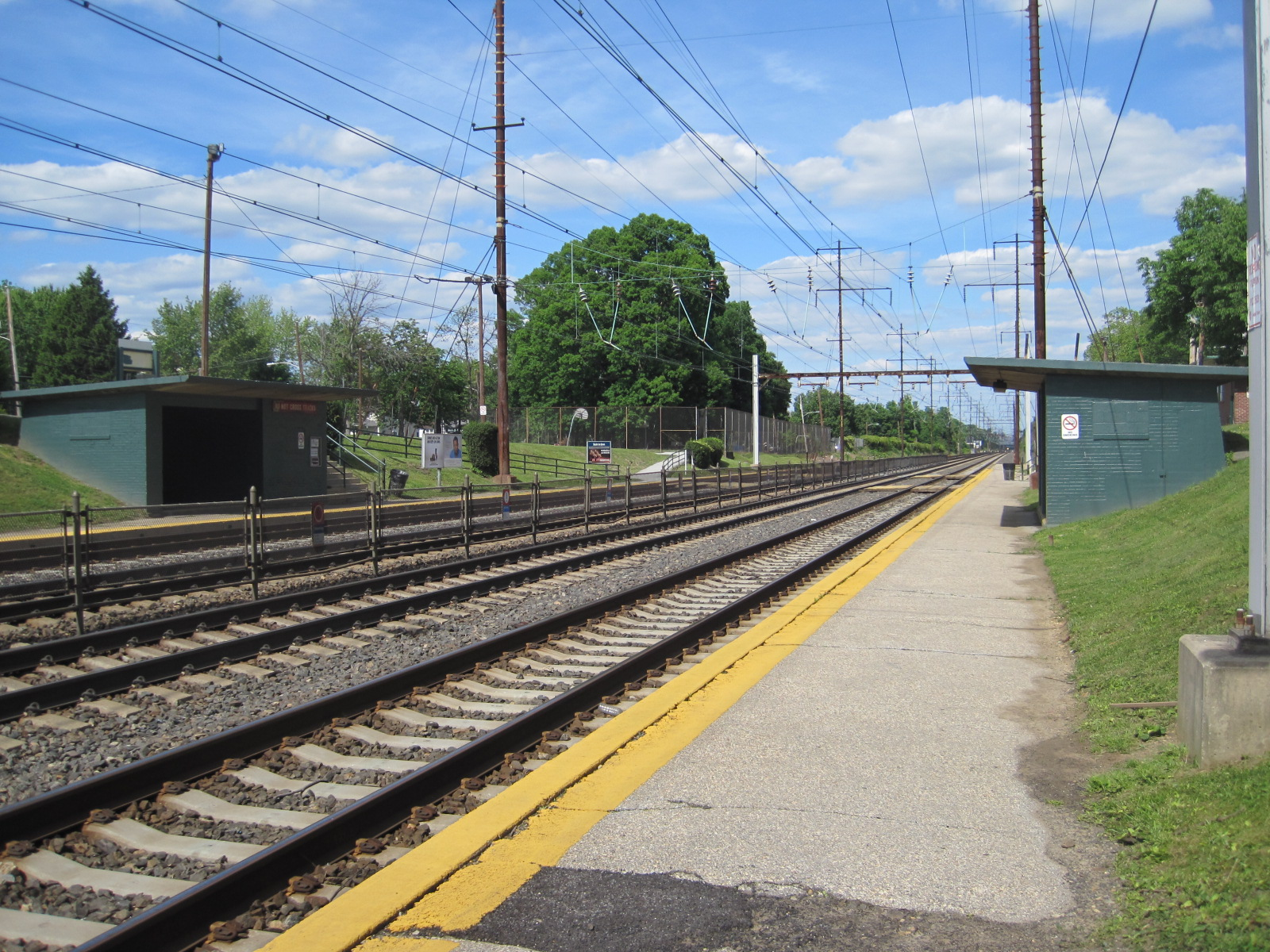
- Norwood station platform

General information
- Location: 498 Welcome Avenue; Norwood, Pennsylvania, U.S.
- Coordinates: 39°53′29″N 75°18′08″W
- Owner: SEPTA
- Line: Amtrak Northeast Corridor
- Platforms: 2 side platforms
- Tracks: 4

Construction
- Parking: 62 spaces
- Accessible: No

Other information
- Fare zone: 2

History
- Opened: September 1, 1875
- Electrified: 1928

Key dates
- 1950: 1875 depot burns
- 1951: 1875 station depot razed

Passengers
- 2017: 267 boardings, 238 alightings (weekday average)
- Rank: 96 of 146

Services
Preceding station	SEPTA	Following station
Prospect Park toward Newark	Wilmington/Newark Line	Glenolden toward Temple University
Former services
Preceding station	Pennsylvania Railroad	Following station
Prospect Park toward Wilmington	Wilmington Line	Glenolden toward Suburban Station
Location

Norwood station is a SEPTA train station on the Wilmington/Newark Line. While on tracks owned by the company, Amtrak trains do not stop here, as it is served only by SEPTA. The line offers southbound service to Marcus Hook, Wilmington and Newark, Delaware and northbound service to Philadelphia and points beyond (most commonly Norristown). The station, located at Winona & Welcome Avenues in Norwood, Pennsylvania, includes a 62-space parking lot on its outbound platform side (along Harrison Avenue). Pedestrian walkways and staircases connect the inbound and outbound platforms via the Amosland Road Bridge, which overpasses the tracks. Opposite the tracks from the SEPTA designated parking lot is metered street and lot parking.

The station opened on September 1, 1875, as part of the Philadelphia, Wilmington and Baltimore Railroad. The depot lasted until May 11, 1950, when a fire burned the structure. The depot was razed on September 25, 1951, over a year later.

== Station layout ==
The station's inbound platform and ticket office is located next to the Norwood Public Library, a branch of the Delaware County Library System. Norwood has two low-level side platforms with walkways connecting passengers to the inner tracks. Amtrak's Northeast Corridor lines bypass the station via the inner tracks.
