= Glenolden station =

SEPTA station in Glenolden, Pennsylvania

Glenolden
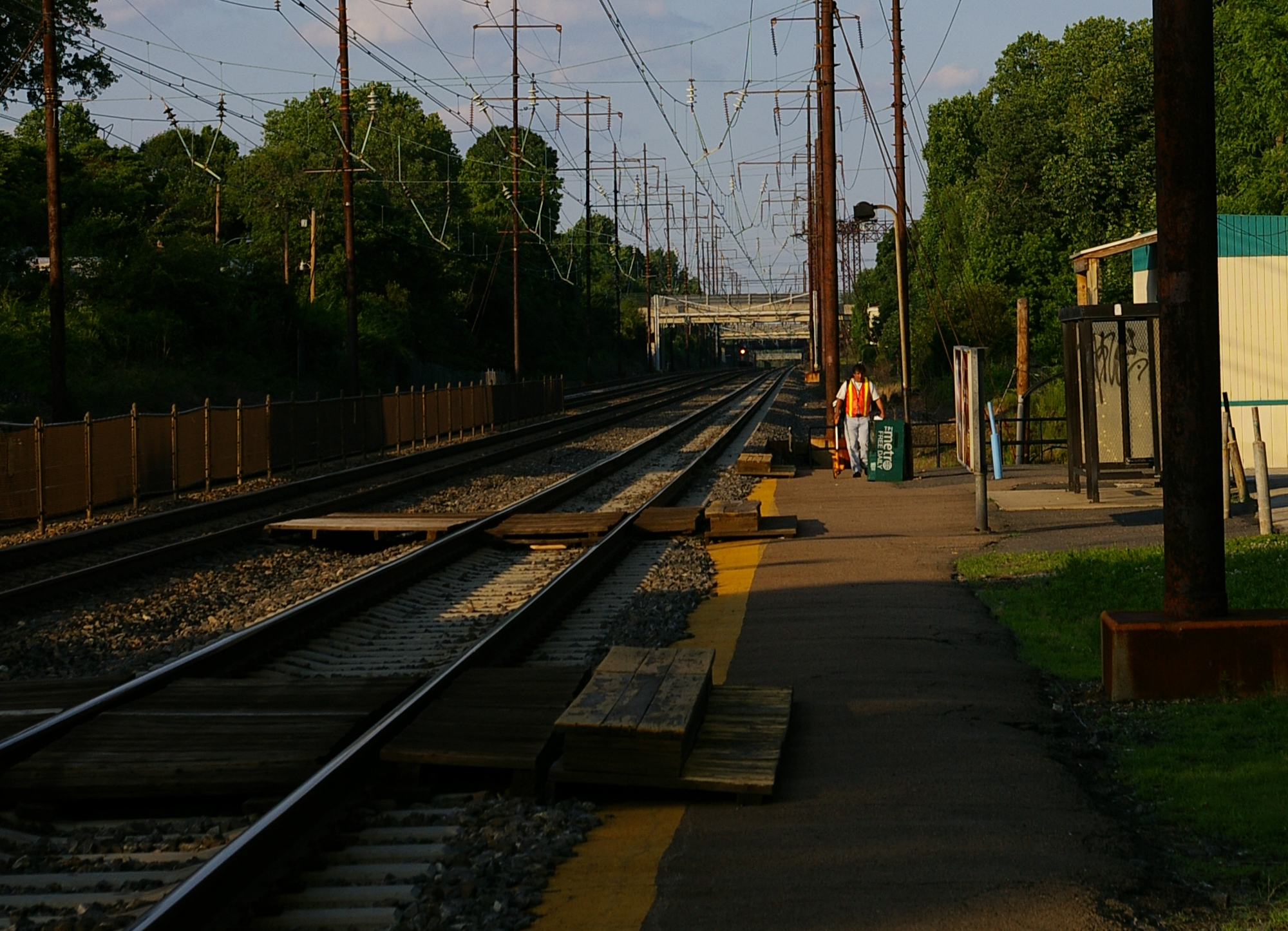
- Glenolden station platform as seen from the south side of the tracks looking east.

General information
- Location: 83 East Glenolden Avenue; Glenolden, Pennsylvania, U.S.
- Coordinates: 39°53′47″N 75°17′23″W
- Owner: SEPTA
- Line: Amtrak Northeast Corridor
- Platforms: 2 side platforms
- Tracks: 4

Construction
- Parking: 73 spaces
- Accessible: No

Other information
- Fare zone: 2

History
- Opened: November 18, 1872
- Electrified: 1928

Key dates
- September 2, 1979: Station depot caught fire

Services
Preceding station	SEPTA	Following station
Norwood toward Newark	Wilmington/Newark Line	Folcroft toward Temple University
Former services
Preceding station	Pennsylvania Railroad	Following station
Prospect Park toward Washington, D.C.	Philadelphia, Wilmington and Baltimore Railroad	Philadelphia Terminus
Norwood toward Wilmington	Wilmington Line	Folcroft toward Suburban Station
Location

Glenolden station is a SEPTA train station on the Wilmington/Newark Line in Pennsylvania. Amtrak does not stop here; it is served only by SEPTA. The line offers southbound service to Wilmington and Newark, Delaware and northbound service to Philadelphia. Located at Glenolden Avenue and Willow Way in Glenolden, the station has a 71-space parking lot.

== Station layout ==
Glenolden has two low-level side platforms with walkways connecting passengers to the inner tracks. Amtrak's Northeast Corridor lines bypass the station via the inner tracks.
