= Crum Lynne station =

Railway station in Ridley Park, Pennsylvania

Crum Lynne
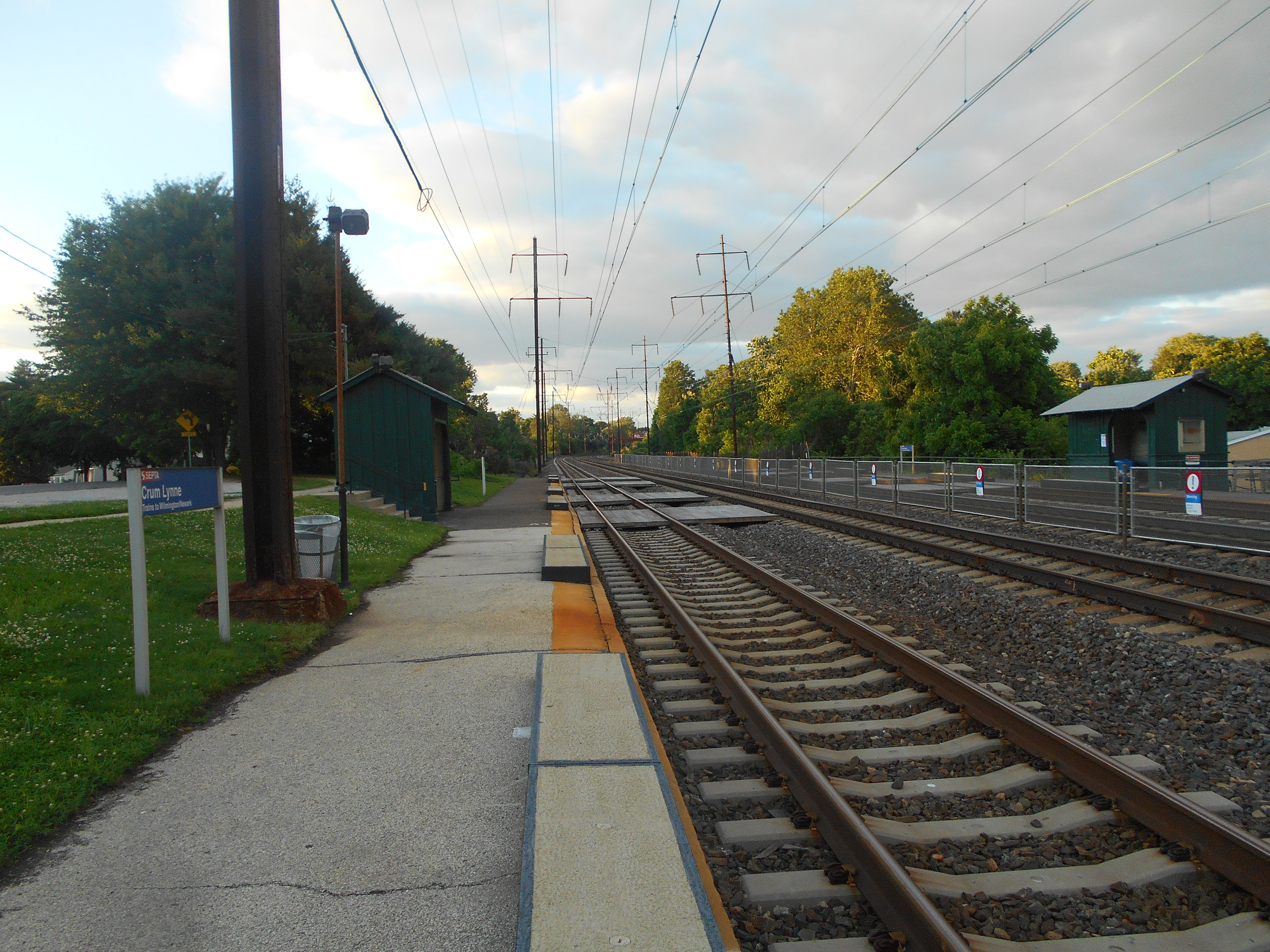
- Crum Lynne station platform in June 2014.

General information
- Location: 350 West Ridley Avenue; Ridley Park, Pennsylvania
- Coordinates: 39°52′19″N 75°19′52″W
- Owner: SEPTA
- Line: Amtrak Northeast Corridor
- Platforms: 2 side platforms
- Tracks: 4
- Connections: SEPTA Suburban Bus: 114

Construction
- Parking: 13 spaces
- Accessible: No

Other information
- Fare zone: 3

History
- Opened: November 18, 1872
- Electrified: 1928

Services
Preceding station	SEPTA	Following station
Eddystone toward Newark	Wilmington/Newark Line	Ridley Park toward Temple University
Former services
Preceding station	Pennsylvania Railroad	Following station
Baldwin toward Wilmington	Wilmington Line	Ridley Park toward Suburban Station
Location

Crum Lynne station is a station on the SEPTA Wilmington/Newark Line. Though the station sits along the Northeast Corridor, it is not served by any Amtrak intercity services. The station, located at Chester Pike (US 13) & West Ridley Avenue in Ridley Park, Pennsylvania, is actually northeast of the community the station is named for. It was named by a then-Pennsylvania Railroad vice president after Crumlin, Wales, where his mother was born. It includes a 14-space parking lot, and sheltered platforms on both West Ridley Avenue and Chester Pike.

== Station layout ==
Crum Lynne has two low-level side platforms with walkways connecting passengers to the inner tracks. Amtrak's Northeast Corridor lines bypass the station via the inner tracks.
