= Lamokin Tower =

Closed interlocking tower in Pennsylvania

Coordinates: 39.8432°N 75.3738°W

Lamokin Tower was a closed interlocking tower of the Pennsylvania Railroad in Chester, Pennsylvania. It was located along the northwest corner of the Lloyd Street Bridge over the Amtrak Northeast Corridor and SEPTA Wilmington/Newark Line. The tower suffered from serious neglect after its closure and was demolished in 2017 along with the adjacent Lloyd Street Bridge.

== History ==
Lamokin Tower was built by the Pennsylvania Railroad (PRR) to control the Chester Creek Branch at its junction with the Northeast Corridor main line. The branch line runs westward from the junction for about 7 miles (11 km) to a connection with the West Chester Branch at Lenni. The tower also controlled a maintenance of way (MOW) track for MOW equipment.

In 1968, when the PRR merged with the New York Central Railroad to form Penn Central (PC), the tower remained active. In 1970, the PC filed for bankruptcy. Two years later, Hurricane Agnes severely damaged the Chester Creek Line; that branch was not rebuilt and the tower was closed.

Between 1972 and 2017 the tower was left in a disused state by PC successor railroad, Amtrak. After the roof fell in the tower was left completely exposed to the elements. In 2017 the tower was demolished along with the adjacent Lloyd Street Bridge, which had been closed to traffic sometime between 2008 and 2012 due to similar structural deterioration.

== See also ==
- SEPTA Regional Rail
- Lamokin Street (SEPTA station)
