= Prospect Park station (SEPTA) =

Railway station in Prospect Park, Pennsylvania

Prospect Park
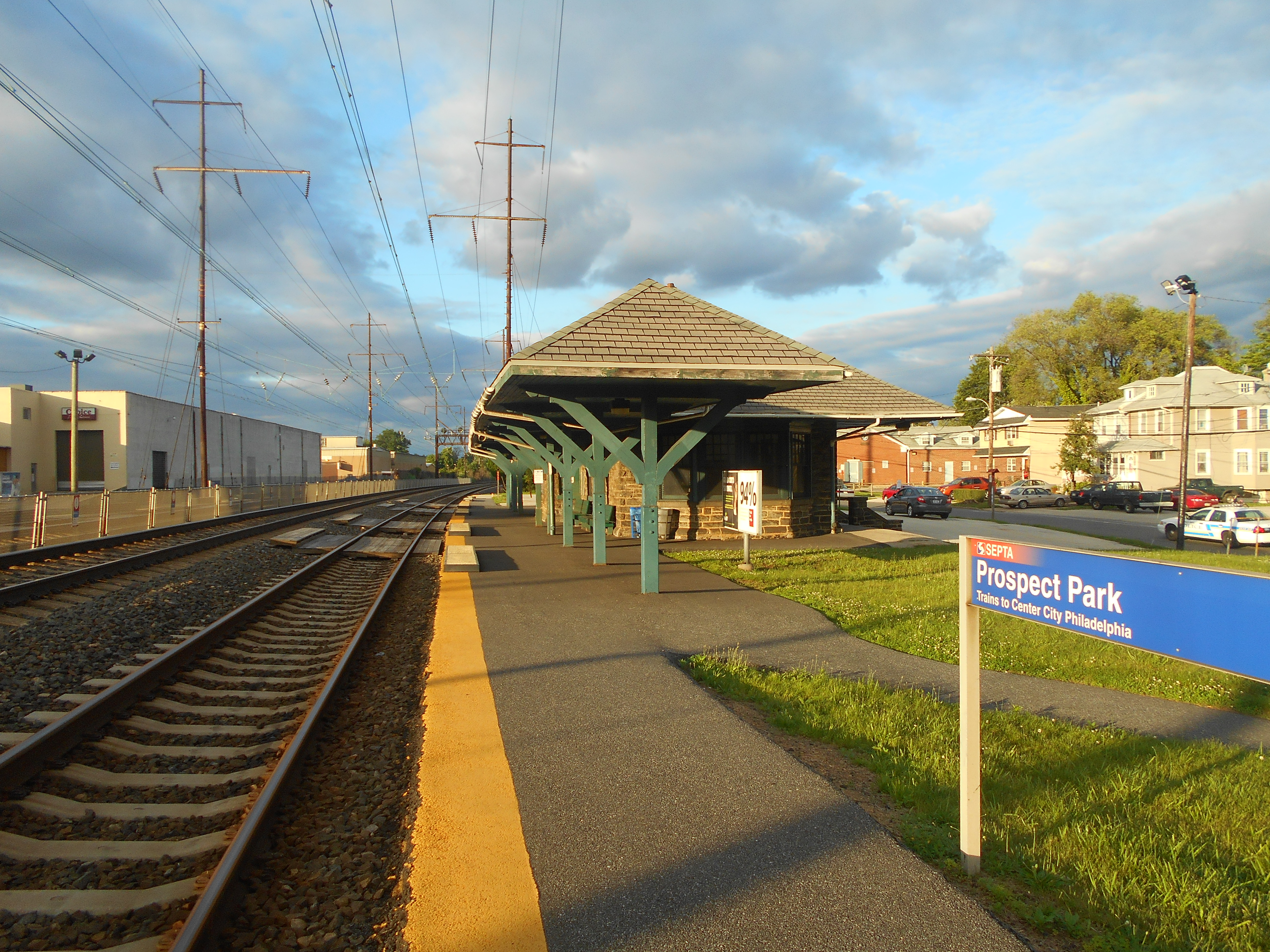
- Prospect Park station platform in June 2014.

General information
- Location: 735 Maryland Avenue; Prospect Park, Pennsylvania, U.S.
- Coordinates: 39°53′17″N 75°18′34″W
- Owner: SEPTA
- Line: Amtrak Northeast Corridor
- Platforms: 2 side platforms
- Tracks: 4

Construction
- Parking: 50 spaces
- Accessible: No

Other information
- Fare zone: 2

History
- Rebuilt: March 1911
- Electrified: 1928
- Former names: Moore

Services
Preceding station	SEPTA	Following station
Ridley Park toward Newark	Wilmington/Newark Line	Norwood toward Temple University
Former services
Preceding station	Pennsylvania Railroad	Following station
Ridley Park toward Washington, D.C.	Philadelphia, Wilmington and Baltimore Railroad	Glenolden toward Philadelphia
Ridley Park toward Wilmington	Wilmington Line	Norwood toward Suburban Station
Location

Prospect Park station (also known as Prospect Park–Moore station) is a station along the SEPTA Wilmington/Newark Line and Amtrak Northeast Corridor. Amtrak does not stop here; only SEPTA serves this station. The station, located at Lincoln and Maryland Avenues in Prospect Park, Pennsylvania, includes a 44-space parking lot. Like the nearby Norwood Station, Prospect Park Station is located right next to the town's library, in this case the Prospect Park Public Library. It is also located near the Borough Hall.

Prospect Park station was originally known as Moore station, and was built by the Philadelphia, Wilmington and Baltimore Railroad. According to the Pennsylvania Railroad Stations, Past & Present website, a property owner named Moore donated the property for this station. He did so, with the "condition" that the station should carry his family name for as long as it exists. The station was renamed to Moore by the Pennsylvania Railroad on April 1, 1932.

However, that same source indicates that the current station building is not the original PW&B structure. ("...the original PW&B station ... predated the station that still exists"). The current station building was constructed by the Pennsylvania Railroad.

== Station layout ==
Prospect Park has two low-level side platforms with walkways connecting passengers to the inner tracks. Amtrak's Northeast Corridor lines bypass the station via the inner tracks.
