= Lamokin Street station =

Railway station in Pennsylvania, United States

Lamokin Street
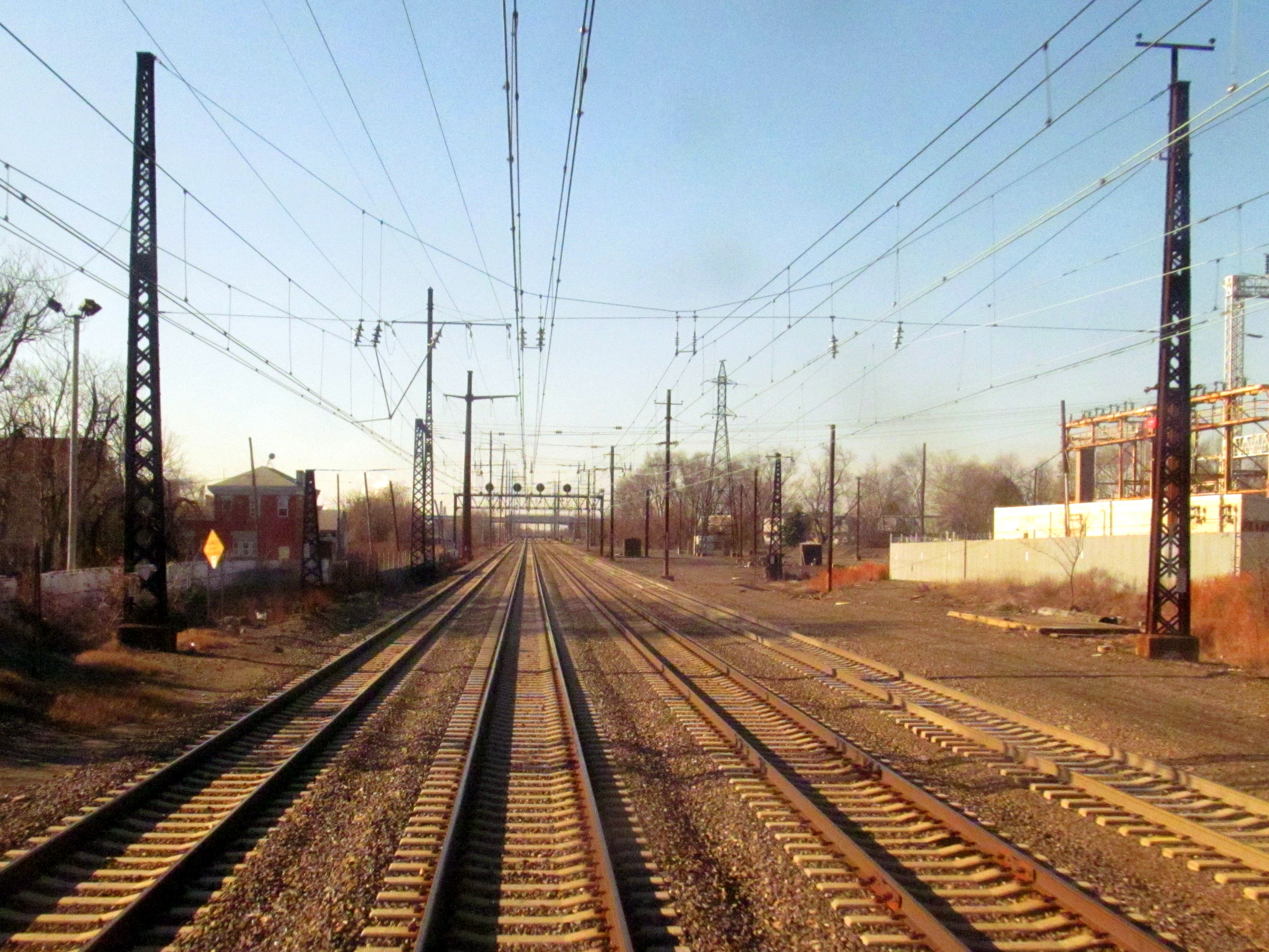
- Former site of Lamokin Street station viewed in 2016

General information
- Location: Lamokin Street; Chester, Pennsylvania
- Coordinates: 39.8420°N 75.3756°W
- System: Former SEPTA Regional Rail station
- Line: Amtrak Northeast Corridor

Construction
- Accessible: No

History
- Opened: November 18, 1872
- Closed: July 1, 2003
- Electrified: September 30, 1928

Former services
Preceding station	SEPTA	Following station
Highland Avenue toward Newark	Wilmington/Newark Line	Chester toward Temple University
Preceding station	Pennsylvania Railroad	Following station
Marcus Hook toward Washington, D.C.	Philadelphia, Wilmington and Baltimore Railroad	Chester toward Philadelphia
Highland Avenue toward Wilmington	Wilmington Line	Chester toward Suburban Station
Upland toward Lenni	Chester Creek Branch	Terminus
Location

Lamokin Street is a former regional rail station that was located on the SEPTA Regional Rail Wilmington/Newark Line at Lamokin Street in Chester, Pennsylvania. Until 1972, it was the junction for the Chester Creek Branch, controlled by nearby Lamokin Tower. The branch line was operated by the Pennsylvania Railroad and later Penn Central, until service ended in 1972 due to damage caused by Hurricane Agnes.

== History and notable features ==
The station was classified as a flag stop, which required passengers to tell the train crew that they wanted to board or depart prior to arrival. It was closed on July 1, 2003 due to its low ridership of just 36 passengers per day.

The former site is adjacent to an electrical substation that provides power to both Amtrak's Northeast Corridor and SEPTA's Media/Wawa lines. Highland Avenue and Chester Transit Center stations nearby are still served by SEPTA.
