= Ridley Park station =

Train station in Pennsylvania, U.S.

Ridley Park
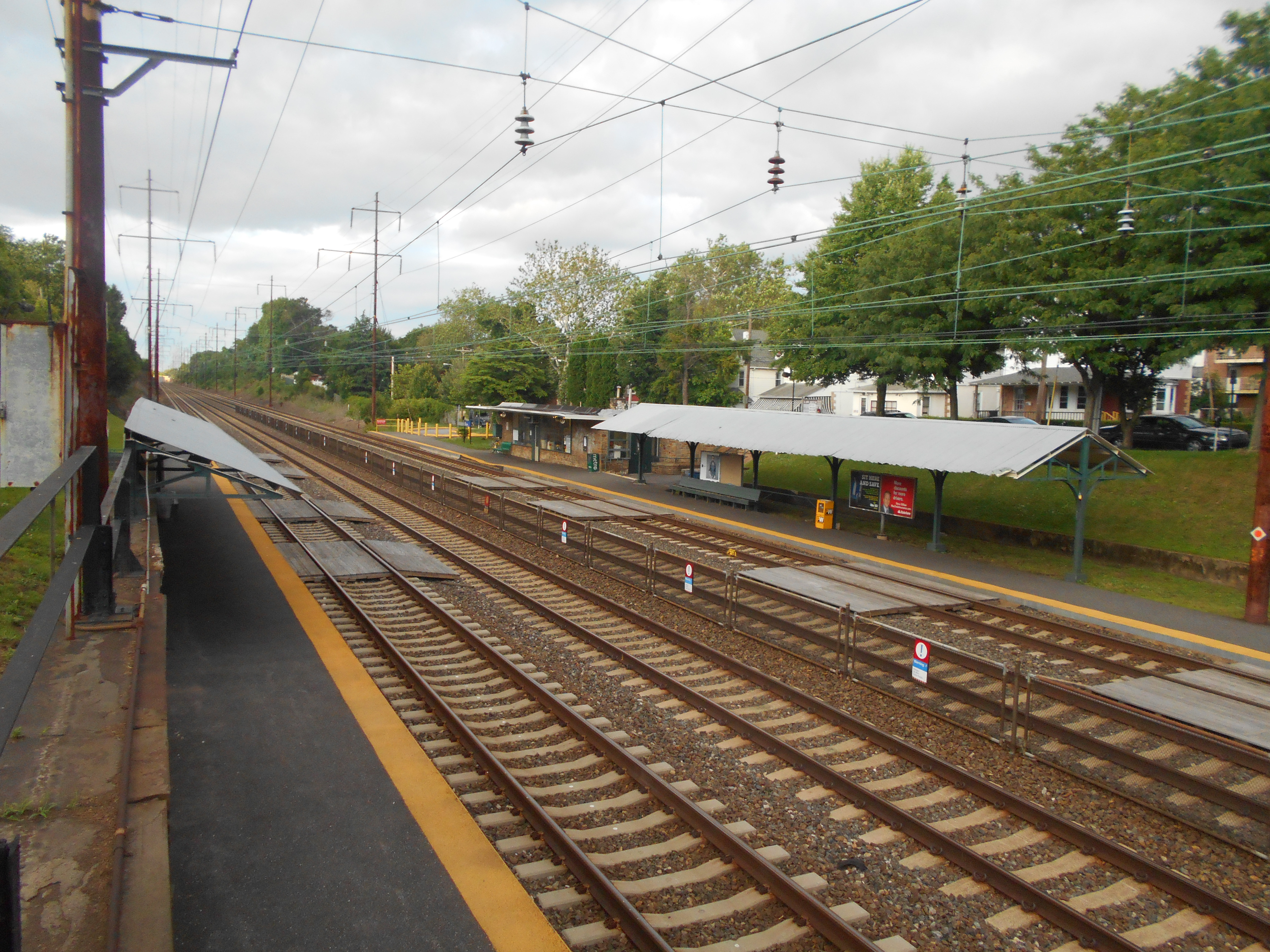
- Ridley Park station platforms in June 2014.

General information
- Location: 201 East Hinckley Avenue; Ridley Park, Pennsylvania, U.S.
- Coordinates: 39°52′50″N 75°19′20″W
- Owner: SEPTA
- Line: Amtrak Northeast Corridor
- Platforms: 2 side platforms
- Tracks: 4

Construction
- Parking: 61 spaces
- Cycle facilities: 10 rack spaces
- Accessible: No

Other information
- Fare zone: 3

History
- Opened: November 18, 1872
- Rebuilt: 1880, 1941
- Electrified: 1928

Services
Preceding station	SEPTA	Following station
Crum Lynne toward Newark	Wilmington/Newark Line	Prospect Park toward Temple University
Former services
Preceding station	Pennsylvania Railroad	Following station
Chester toward Washington, D.C.	Philadelphia, Wilmington and Baltimore Railroad	Prospect Park toward Philadelphia
Crum Lynne toward Wilmington	Wilmington Line	Prospect Park toward Suburban Station
Location

Ridley Park station is a station along the Northeast Corridor. Amtrak does not stop here; only SEPTA's Wilmington/Newark Line trains serve this station. It is located at Hinckley and Morton Avenues in Ridley Park, Pennsylvania, and contains a one-story station house similar to that of Media Regional Rail station built into the embankment next to a platform, as well as a passenger drop-off area at Hinckley Avenue and Lincoln Street. Another platform also exists on the opposite side of the tracks on Ridley and Morton Avenues. Access between the two platforms is available from the nearby Ward Street Bridge just west of the station.

The current Ridley Park station was built by the Pennsylvania Railroad as a replacement for a much more elaborate station house which was built over the tracks by the Philadelphia, Wilmington and Baltimore Railroad during the 19th century. The current station building opened in 1942 and was designed by architect Lester C. Tichy in association with designer Raymond Loewy. Historic photographs and architectural drawings of the Ridley Park station can be found in the March 1943 issue of The Architectural Forum magazine.

== Station layout ==
Ridley Park has two low-level side platforms with walkways connecting passengers to the inner tracks. Amtrak's Northeast Corridor lines bypass the station via the inner tracks.
