= Chester Transit Center =

SEPTA station in Chester, Pennsylvania

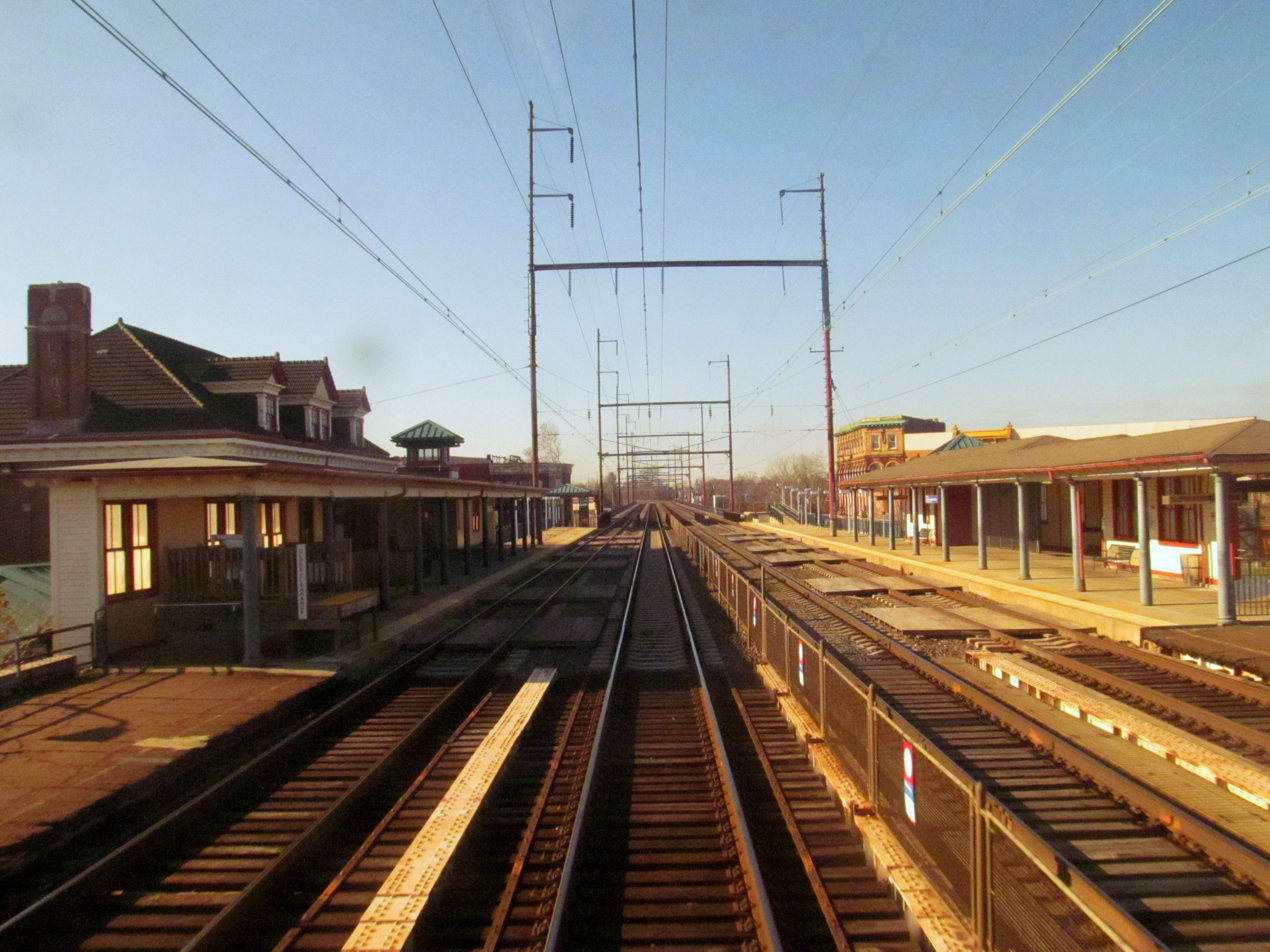
- Chester Transit Center viewed from the rear of an Amtrak train in January 2016

General information
- Location: 595 Avenue Of The States; Chester, Pennsylvania, U.S.
- Coordinates: 39°50′58″N 75°21′36″W
- Owner: SEPTA
- Line: Amtrak Northeast Corridor
- Platforms: 2 side platforms
- Tracks: 4
- Connections: SEPTA City Bus: 37; SEPTA Suburban Bus: 109, 113, 114, 117, 118, 119

Construction
- Cycle facilities: 10 rack spaces
- Accessible: Yes

Other information
- Fare zone: 3

History
- Opened: 1903
- Electrified: 1928
- Former names: Chester Transportation Center (?–2025)

Services
| Preceding station | SEPTA | Following station |
|---|---|---|
| Highland Avenue toward Newark | Wilmington/Newark Line | Eddystone toward Temple University |
Former services
| Preceding station | Amtrak | Following station |
|---|---|---|
| Wilmington toward Washington, D.C. | Chesapeake | Philadelphia–30th Street toward Philadelphia–Suburban |
| Preceding station | Pennsylvania Railroad | Following station |
| Lamokin Street toward Washington, D.C. | Philadelphia, Wilmington and Baltimore Railroad | Ridley Park toward Philadelphia |
| Lamokin Street toward Wilmington | Wilmington Line | Eddystone toward Suburban Station |
| Preceding station | SEPTA | Following station |
| Lamokin Street (Closed 2003) toward Newark | Wilmington/Newark Line | Eddystone toward Temple University |
Location

The Chester Transit Center is a SEPTA bus and train station in Chester, Pennsylvania. The outside portion of the ground level serves SEPTA City Transit Division Route 37, and Suburban Transit Division Routes 109, 113, 114, 117, 118, and 119.

Above the building of the transit center is the train station. The tracks run over the building. The station is served by the Wilmington/Newark Line. The line offers southbound service to Wilmington and Newark, Delaware and northbound service to Philadelphia.

This station is located at 6th and Welsh Streets.

== History ==
Chester station was built by the Pennsylvania Railroad in 1903. While in the 1940s Chester was a common intermediate stop for services between New York and Washington, by the 1970s this was reduced to just one daily train; the station was also served by Amtrak's Chesapeake, which stopped both ways between Philadelphia and Washington during its existence from 1978 through 1983.

All long-distance services have since stopped calling at Chester. PRR/PC/Conrail local trains to Marcus Hook/Wilmington/Newark continued until SEPTA took them over in 1983.

== Station layout ==
Chester has two low-level side platforms with walkways connecting passengers to the inner tracks. Amtrak's Northeast Corridor lines bypass the station via the inner tracks.

== Gallery ==
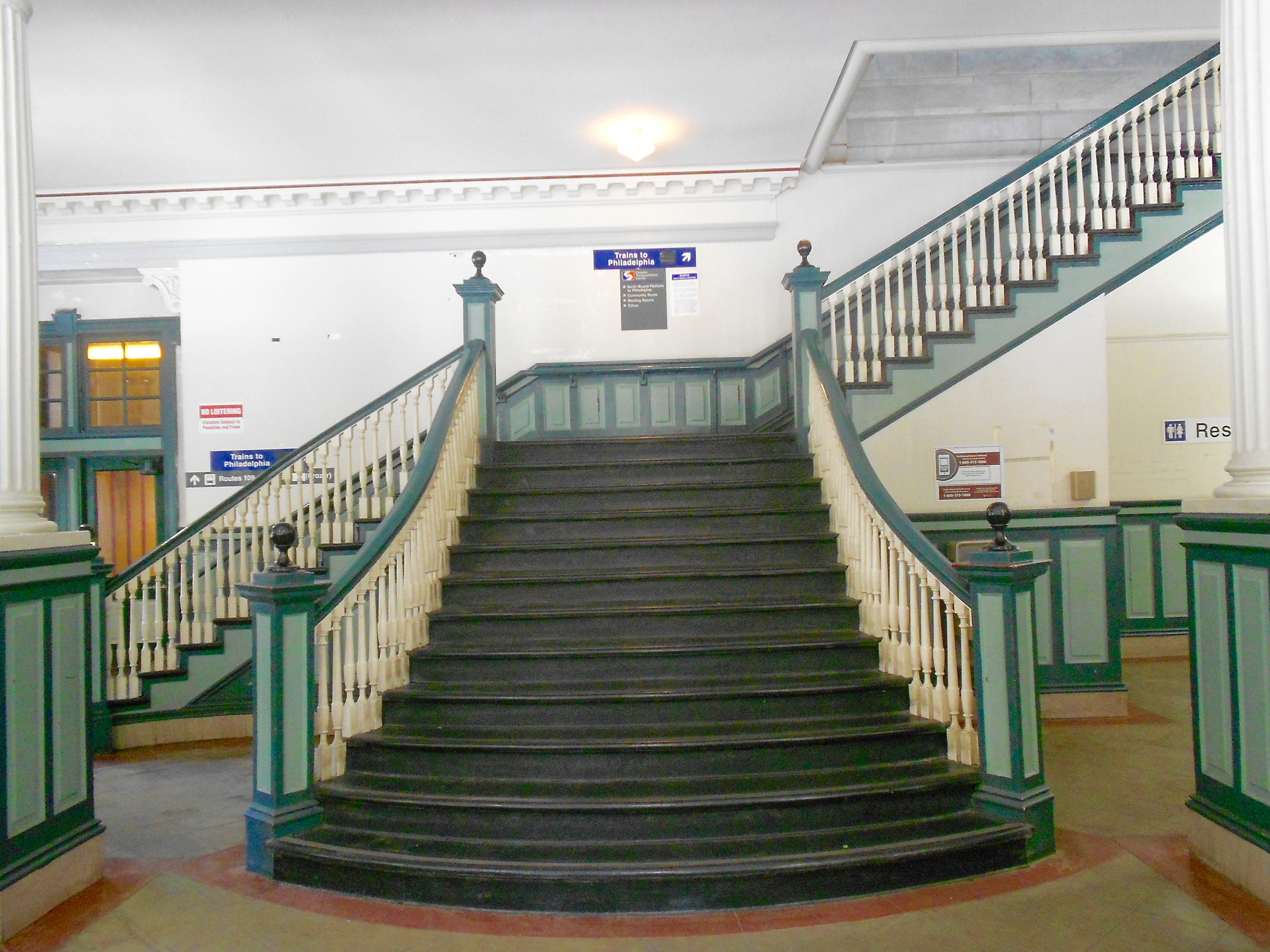
Stairway to the rail platforms

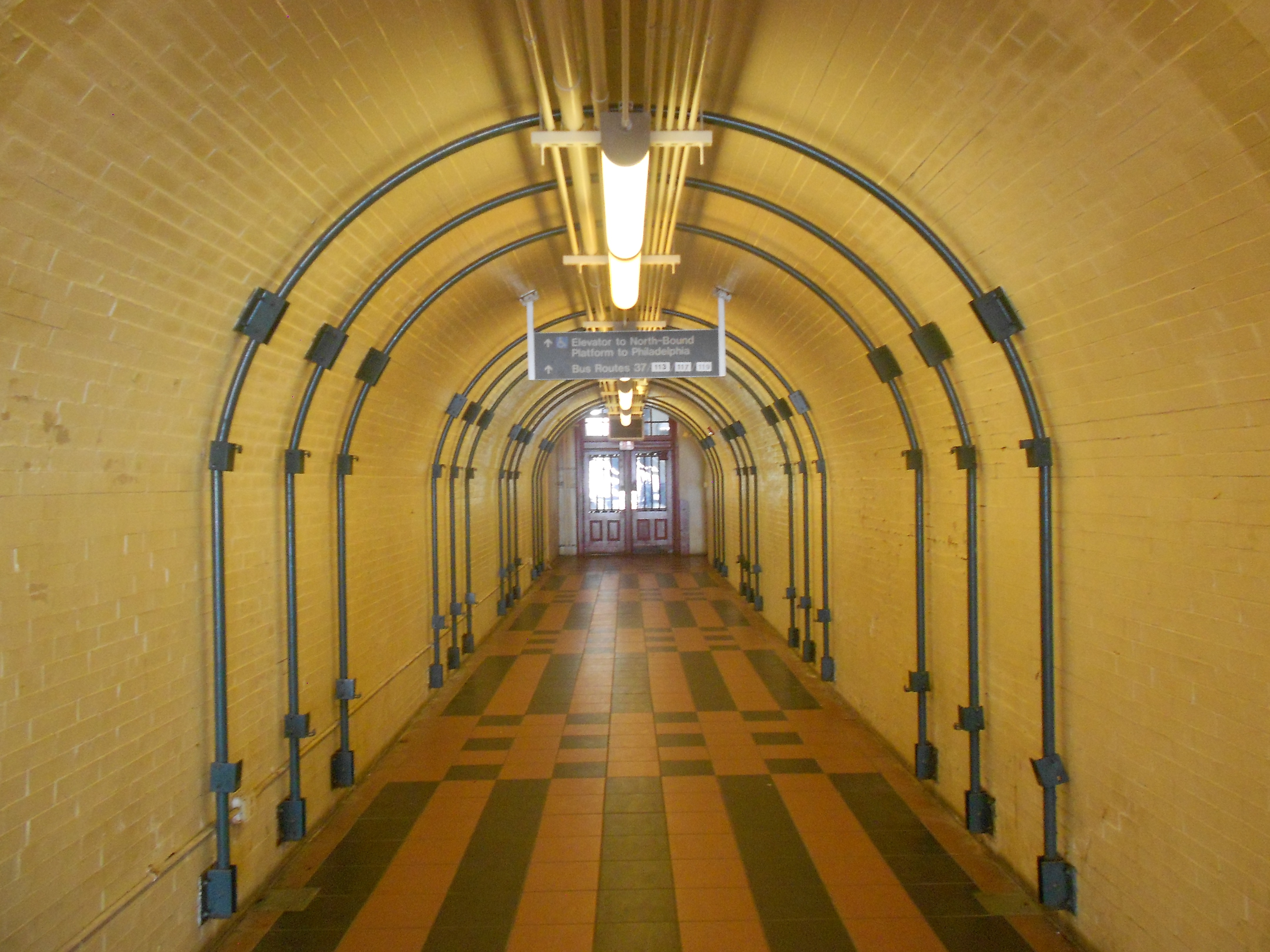
Tunnel under the tracks

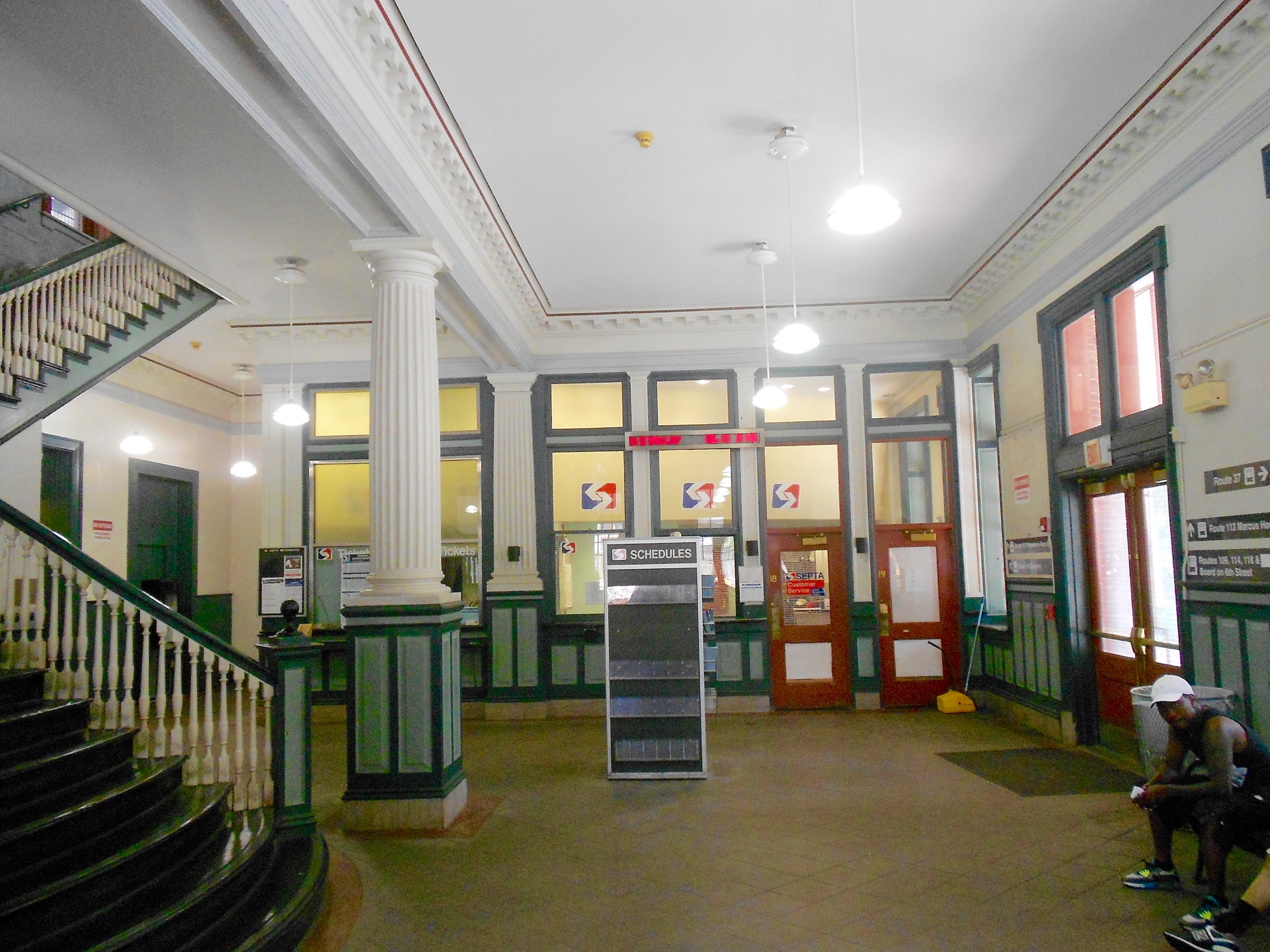
Interior of the station

== See also ==
- New Brunswick station – built according to similar blueprints at about the same time
