= Elkton station =

Former railway station in Elkton, Maryland, US

Elkton, MD
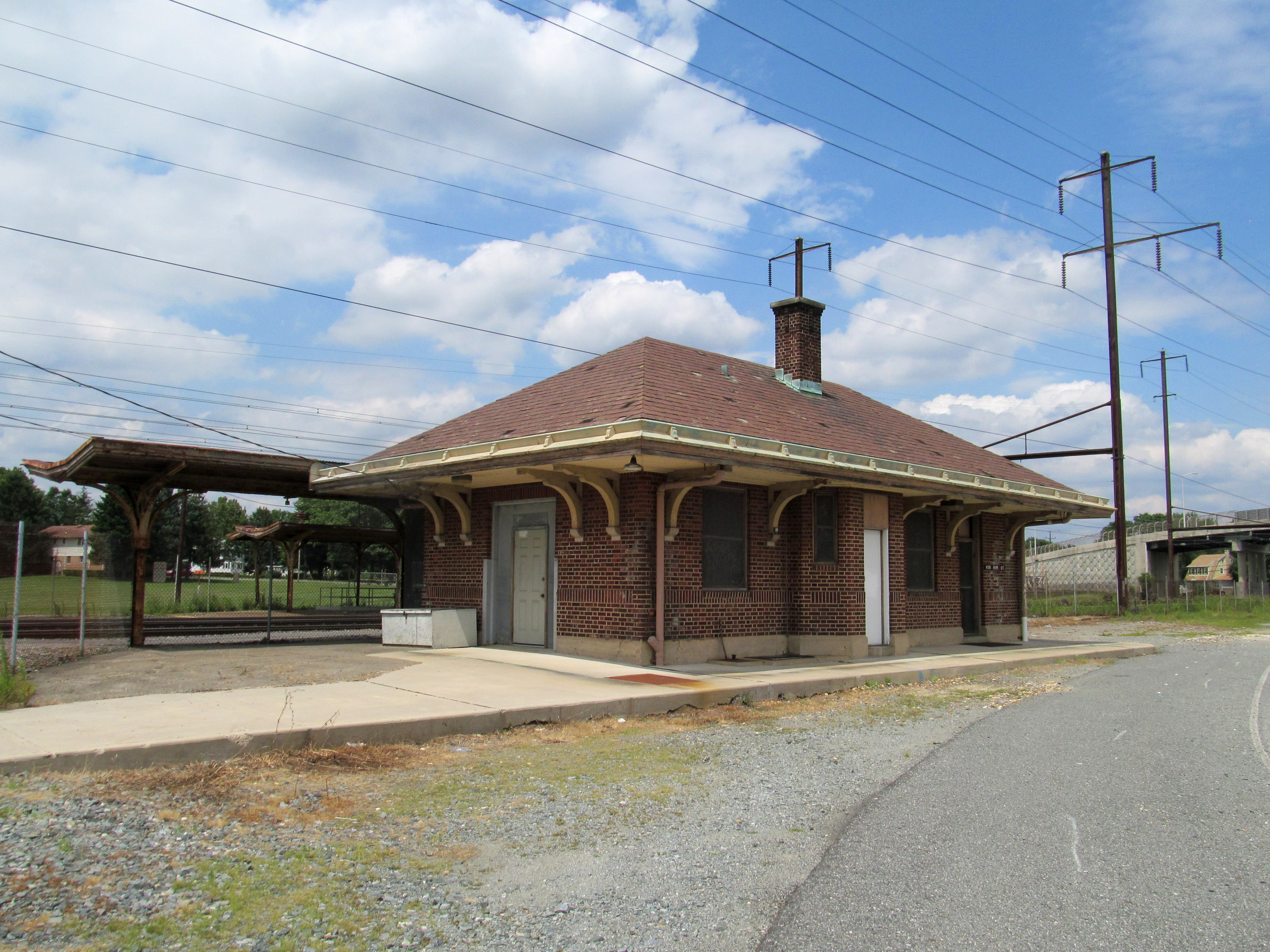
- Elkton station photographed in 2014

General information
- Location: Bow Street, Elkton, Maryland
- Coordinates: 39°36′47.76″N 75°49′53.45″W
- Owner: Amtrak
- Line: Amtrak Northeast Corridor
- Platforms: 2 side platforms
- Tracks: 3

Construction
- Accessible: No

History
- Opened: July 31, 1837 (first time); April 30, 1978 (second time)
- Closed: July 4, 1967 (first time); October 29, 1983 (second time)
- Electrified: January 28, 1935 (ceremonial); February 10, 1935 (regular service)

Former services
Preceding station	Amtrak	Following station
Perryville toward Washington, D.C.	Chesapeake	Newark, Delaware toward Philadelphia–Suburban
Preceding station	Pennsylvania Railroad	Following station
North-East toward Washington, D.C.	Philadelphia, Wilmington and Baltimore Railroad	Iron Hill toward Philadelphia

Proposed services
Preceding station	MARC	Following station
Perryville toward Union Station	Penn Line	Newark toward Wilmington
Location

Elkton station is a former passenger rail station located in Elkton, Maryland. The last passenger service to the station was Amtrak's Chesapeake from 1978 to 1983. The brick station building still remains along the Northeast Corridor tracks.

== History ==
=== Pennsylvania Railroad ===
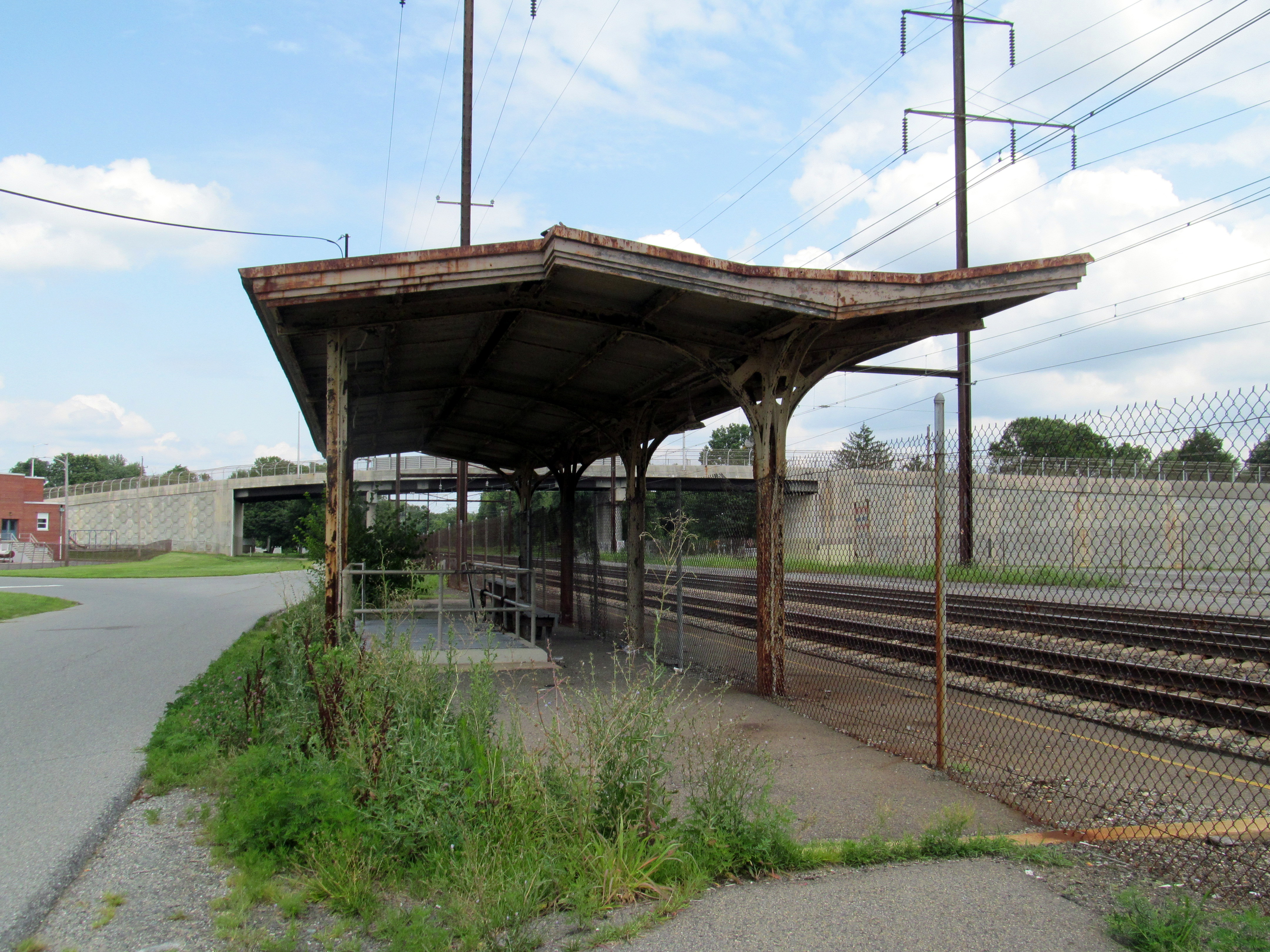
The 1935-built station included this southbound passenger shelter, with a pedestrian subway (grey grate under the canopy).

The Philadelphia, Wilmington, and Baltimore Railroad was completed from Wilmington to Baltimore in 1837 (save for the Susquehanna River ferry), with stops at most population centers including Elkton. A test train ran from Wilmington to Elkton on January 9, 1837, though service did not begin until July 31 of that year. A replacement station was built in 1855. The line became part of the Pennsylvania Railroad (PRR) in 1881.

The line originally ran on a tight curve through the town center, disrupting traffic and creating a collision hazard at grade crossings, as well as acting as a major speed restriction on express trains. In 1934, the PRR moved the line north of the downtown area to ease the curve and eliminate all grade crossings in Elkton. Construction on a new station began in February 1935 and was completed several months later. The new brick depot included baggage and waiting rooms, and a pedestrian passage under the tracks to the southbound platform. By 1938 Elkton was served by 18 trains per day.

Traffic declined after the construction of the Interstate Highway System; stopping service declined to three daily trains by 1963 and ended several years later.The line passed to Penn Central and eventually to Amtrak with all trains passing Elkton without stopping.

=== Amtrak ===
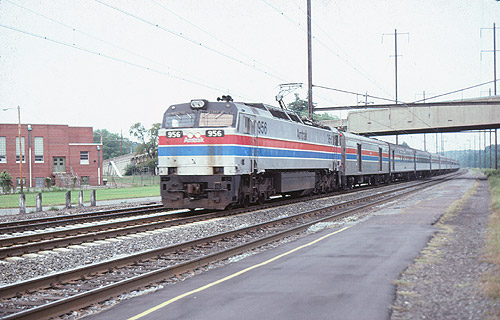
An Amtrak train passes Elkton station in 1981

On April 30, 1978, Amtrak began operation of the Chesapeake, a once-daily commuter train between Philadelphia and Washington D.C., which included reopening several closed stations.

On January 1, 1983, the obligation for Conrail to provide commuter service on rail lines it had taken over in 1976 ended. SEPTA Regional Rail took over Philadelphia-area lines, while Amtrak began operating service in Maryland under contract to MARC. Now largely redundant to Amtrak intercity and MARC regional service, the Chesapeake was cut on October 30, 1983. SEPTA's Wilmington/Newark Line ran as far south as Newark, Delaware, while MARC service ran as far north as Perryville, Maryland. Elkton station, the only station in the gap between the two, was abandoned.

=== Proposed MARC service ===
MARC released proposals for future capital improvement from 2026–2041 in 2025. This would include upgrades to the Penn Line in incremental phases, including a new stop at Elkton and Bayview in Baltimore, Maryland between 2031 and 2040. MARC also proposed that they would establish a pilot service to Wilmington, Delaware, where there would be connections to SEPTA and Amtrak. After 2041, there would be potential for peak service to Wilmington every two hours.
