= MARC Train =

U.S. passenger rail system in Baltimore–Washington metropolitan area

Maryland Area Regional Commuter

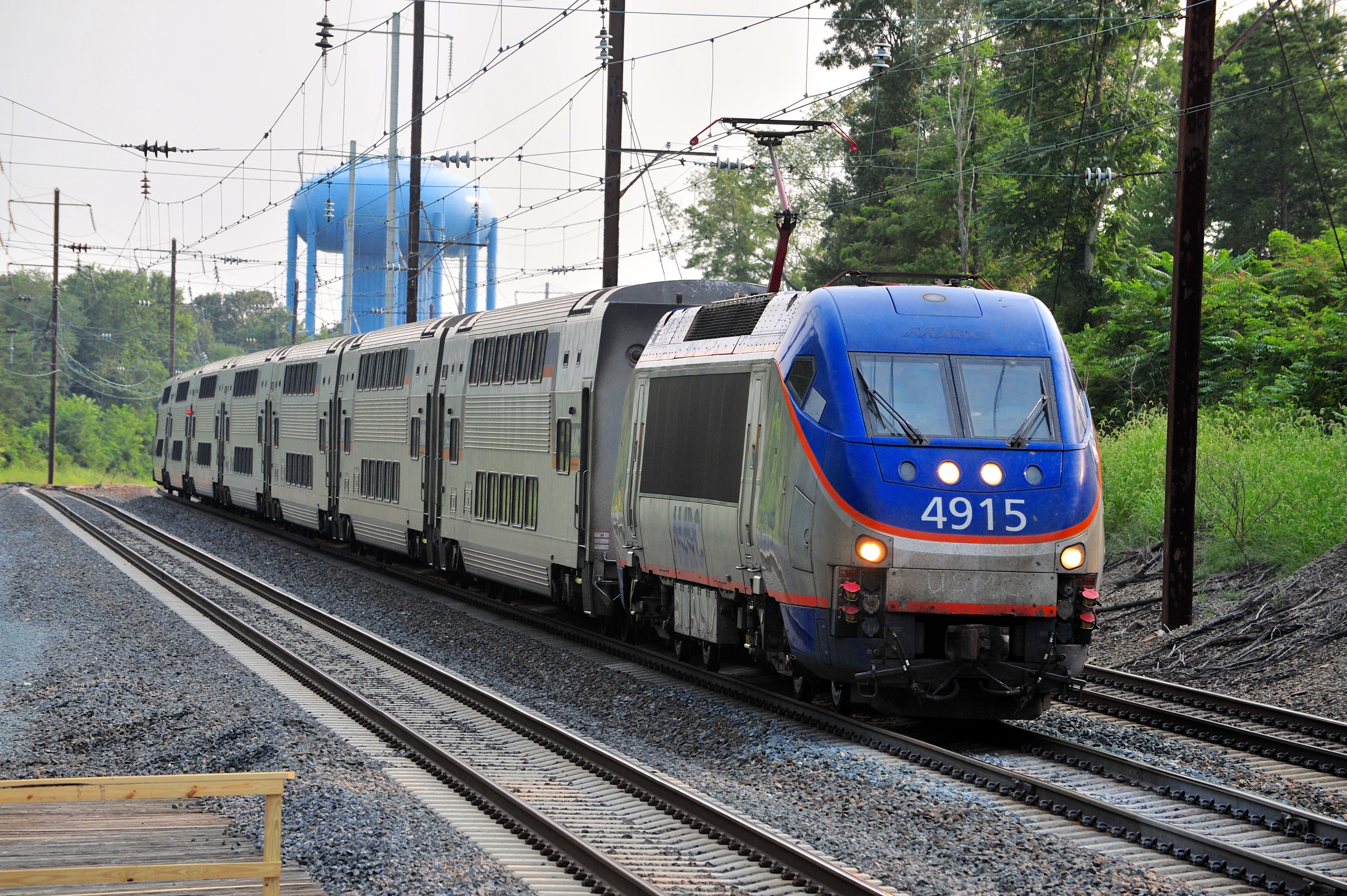
- A MARC HHP-8 leads an express train into Odenton station in Odenton, Maryland

Overview
- Owner: Maryland Transit Administration
- Locale: Baltimore–Washington metropolitan area
- Transit type: Commuter rail
- Number of lines: 3
- Number of stations: 42
- Daily ridership: 20,800 (weekdays, Q2 2026)
- Annual ridership: 5,222,500 (2025)
- Chief executive: Tony Bridges
- Website: mta.maryland.gov/marc-train

Operation
- Began operation: 1984; 42 years ago (as Maryland Rail Commuter)
- Operators: Alstom (Camden and Brunswick Lines); Amtrak (Penn Line)
- Reporting marks: MARC
- Infrastructure managers: Amtrak, CSX

Technical
- System length: 187 mi (301 km)
- Track gauge: 4 ft 8 1/2 in (1,435 mm) standard gauge
- Electrification: Overhead line, 12 kV 25 Hz AC (Penn Line)
- Top speed: 125 mph (201 km/h)
System map
Key

The Maryland Area Regional Commuter (MARC) is a commuter rail system in the Washington–Baltimore area. MARC (reporting mark MARC) is administered by the Maryland Transit Administration (MTA) and operated under contract by Alstom and Amtrak on track owned by CSX Transportation (CSXT) and Amtrak. In 2025, the system had a ridership of 5,222,500, or about 20,800 per weekday as of the second quarter of 2026.

Trains on the Penn Line can travel 125 miles per hour (201 km/h), higher than any other commuter railroad in the United States.

== Operations ==
MARC has three lines that radiate from Union Station in Washington, D.C.:

- Penn Line – 58 weekday trains
- Camden Line – 21 weekday trains
- Brunswick Line – 18 weekday trains

The Penn Line is the only line with weekend service, having 18 trains on Saturdays and 12 on Sundays. Service is reduced or suspended on certain federal holidays.

All MARC trains operate in push–pull mode. The cab car is typically on the end of the train closest to Washington; on trains with diesel locomotives, this arrangement keeps exhaust further away from Union Station's terminal. Train lengths vary from 3 to 5 cars to 10 cars on Penn Line rush-hour trains. Shorter trains typically consist either of single-level or bilevel passenger cars while longer trains may have a combination.

The MTA pays Amtrak to operate and maintain MARC trains on the Penn Line and Alstom on the Brunswick Line and Camden Line.

Introduced in September 2026, one weekday round trip operates between Brunswick and Camden Station via the Brunswick and Camden lines, bypassing Union Station.

=== Penn Line ===
The Penn Line is a 77-mile (124 km) line that runs along the far southern leg of Amtrak's Northeast Corridor between Washington, D.C., and Perryville, Maryland, via Baltimore Penn Station. Most trains operate along a 39-mile (63 km) stretch between Washington and Baltimore Penn, with limited service to Martin State Airport and Perryville. It is the fastest commuter rail line in North America, with equipment capable of operating up to 125 miles per hour (201 km/h). Descended from Washington–Baltimore commuter routes operated by the Pennsylvania Railroad, it is by far the busiest MARC line, with almost twice as many trains and twice as many passengers as the other two lines combined. The Penn Line is the only electrified MARC line, and its only line that operates on weekends.

=== Camden Line ===
The Camden Line is a 39-mile (63 km) line that runs on CSX-owned tracks between Washington, D.C., and Camden Station in Baltimore. It is descended from B&O commuter routes running between Washington and Baltimore. The B&O began operating over portions of this route in 1830, making it one of the oldest passenger rail lines in the U.S. still in operation.

=== Brunswick Line ===
The Brunswick Line is a 74-mile (119 km) line that runs on CSX-owned tracks between Washington, D.C., and Martinsburg, West Virginia, with a 14-mile (23 km) branch to Frederick, Maryland. It is descended from Baltimore and Ohio Railroad (B&O) commuter service between Washington and its northern and western suburbs.

== History ==
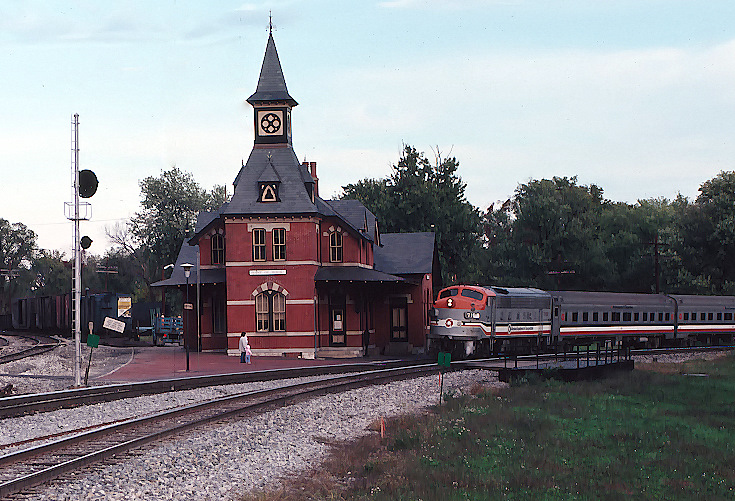
A MARC EMD F9PH leads a service through Point of Rocks in 1987

=== Origins ===
All three MARC lines date from the 19th century. Service on the Baltimore and Ohio Railroad (B&O) between Baltimore and Ellicott City began on May 24, 1830, over part of what is now the Camden Line. B&O service between Baltimore and Washington, the modern Camden Line route, began on August 25, 1835.

The B&O's main line was extended to Frederick Junction (with a branch to Frederick) in 1831, to Point of Rocks in 1832, to Brunswick and Harpers Ferry in 1834, and Martinsburg in 1842. The B&O completed its Metropolitan Branch in 1873; most service from Martinsburg and Frederick was then diverted onto the Metropolitan Branch to Washington, and the old main line became a secondary route. This established the basic route for what would become the Brunswick Line.

The Philadelphia, Wilmington and Baltimore Railroad (PW&B) completed its line between Baltimore and Philadelphia in December 1838, save for the ferry across the Susquehanna River, which was not bridged until the 1860s. Although the B&O was chartered with the unspoken assumption that no competing line would be built between Baltimore and Washington, the Pennsylvania Railroad-owned Baltimore and Potomac Railroad (B&P) was completed between the two cities in 1872. The PW&B was initially hostile to the Pennsylvania (PRR); however, the PRR acquired it in a stock battle with the B&O in 1881. The PW&B soon began operating PRR through service – the ancestor of Penn Line service – between Washington and Philadelphia in conjunction with the B&P. Meanwhile, the PRR ended B&O trackage rights over the PW&B in 1884, forcing it to open its own parallel route in 1886. The PW&B and the B&P were combined into the PRR's Philadelphia, Baltimore and Washington Railroad in 1902.

The B&O ended local service on the Frederick Branch in November 1949. All B&O passenger service between Baltimore and Philadelphia ended in 1958; local service from Washington was curtailed to Camden Station. The B&O continued to offer local service to Brunswick plus long-distance service, while the PRR operated a mix of local, intercity, and long-distance service on the Northeast Corridor. Local service north of Baltimore on the PRR ended around 1964.

=== Public takeover ===
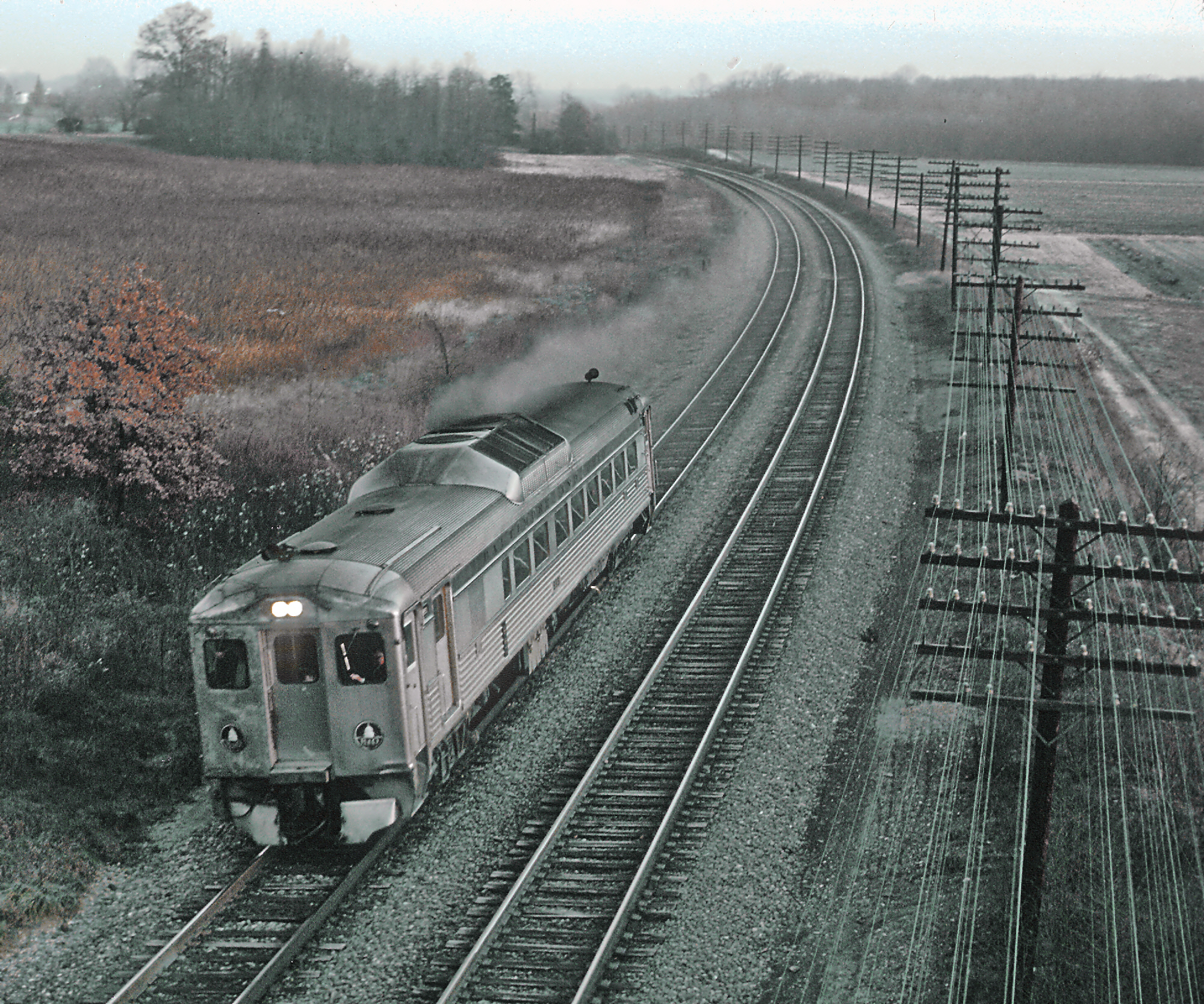
A Baltimore and Ohio Railroad train near the Capital Beltway in 1970, running on what is now the Camden Line

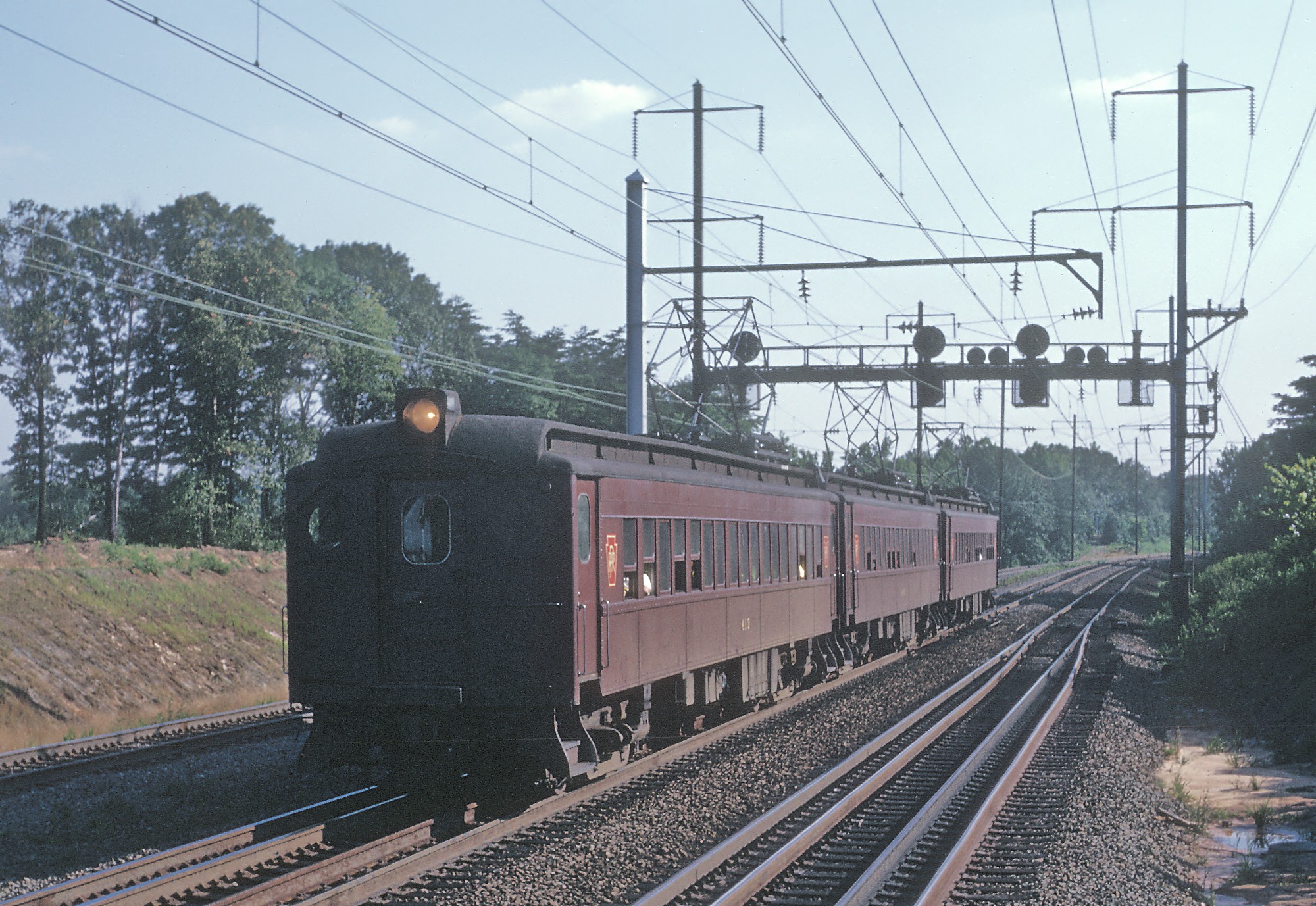
A Penn Central train near the Beltway in 1970, running on what is now the Penn Line

In the mid-20th century, passenger rail service declined owing to a variety of factors, particularly the advent of the automobile, even as commuting between suburban locations and urban business districts remained common. In 1968, the PRR folded into Penn Central, which took over its passenger operations. On May 1, 1971, Amtrak took over most intercity passenger service in the United States, including some of Penn Central's former routes. The B&O and Penn Central continued to operate their Washington–Baltimore and Washington–Brunswick commuter routes without subsidies.

Amtrak initially operated the Washington–Parkersburg West Virginian, later renamed Potomac Special. The Potomac Special was cut back to a 146-mile (235 km) commuter-based Washington–Cumberland trip, the Blue Ridge, on May 7, 1973. In early 1974, the B&O threatened to discontinue its remaining unsubsidized commuter services, citing heavy losses. On March 1, 1974, the Maryland Department of Transportation (MDOT) began a 50% subsidy of the B&O's Washington–Brunswick and Washington–Baltimore service – the first state-sponsored commuter rail service to Washington. In 1975, the state signed an operating agreement with the B&O, under which the state provided rolling stock and reimbursed the railroad for all operating losses. On October 31, 1976, Amtrak introduced the Washington–Cincinnati Shenandoah and cut the Blue Ridge to a 73-mile (117 km) Washington–Martinsburg trip. In the late 1970s, West Virginia began to fund the B&O shuttles between Brunswick and Martinsburg; the shuttles were soon incorporated as extensions of Brunswick service in order to secure Urban Mass Transportation Administration subsidies. In December 1981, MDOT purchased 22 ex-PRR coaches for use on B&O lines. The Maryland State Railroad Administration (SRA) was established in 1986 to administer contracts, procure rolling stock, and oversee short line railroads in the state.

Conrail took over the unsubsidized ex-PRR Baltimore–Washington service from Penn Central at its creation on April 1, 1976. MDOT began subsidizing that service after Conrail threatened to discontinue service on April 1, 1977. Prior to 1978, most ex-PRR Baltimore–Washington service was operated by aging MP54 electric multiple units, most dating back to the line's 1933 electrification. In 1978, Amtrak and the City of Baltimore negotiated with the New Jersey Department of Transportation to lease a number of new Arrow railcars to replace the MP54s. With funding from Pennsylvania and Maryland, Amtrak used some of the cars to initiate a Philadelphia–Washington commuter trip, the Chesapeake, on April 30, 1978. The Chesapeake stopped at some local stations but fewer than the Conrail service; it provided commuter service from north of Baltimore for the first time since the 1960s.

BWI Rail Station opened for Amtrak and Conrail trains on October 26, 1980. In August 1982, Conrail trains began stopping at Capital Beltway station, used by intercity trains since 1970. Lanham and Landover stations were closed. Two additional round trips – one in the peak direction, and one reverse for commuters working in Baltimore – were added on July 5, 1983. On October 30, 1983, Amtrak and MARC moved from Capital Beltway into a new platform and waiting room at nearby New Carrollton station, which had been served by the Washington Metro since 1978. The Edmondson Avenue and Frederick Road stops in Baltimore were replaced by West Baltimore station on April 30, 1984.

In 1981, MDOT began installing highway signs to point drivers to commuter rail stations. The Northeast Rail Service Act of 1981 allowed Conrail to shed its commuter rail operations in 1983 in order to focus on its more profitable freight operations. On January 1, 1983, public operators (including Metro-North Railroad, NJ Transit, and SEPTA Regional Rail) took over Conrail commuter rail systems in the Northeast. MDOT began paying Amtrak to run the ex-PRR Washington–Baltimore service. That service was branded as AMDOT (Amtrak Maryland Department of Transportation). In October 1983, with low patronage and largely duplicated by the MDOT-subsidized service, the Chesapeake was discontinued. In 1984, the SRA introduced a unified brand for its three subsidized lines, MARC (originally short for Maryland Rail Commuter, later modified to Maryland Area Rail Commuter). Operations remained the same, but public elements such as schedules and crew uniforms were consolidated under the new name. MARC soon dubbed its three lines the Penn Line, Camden Line, and Brunswick Line.

=== Improved service ===
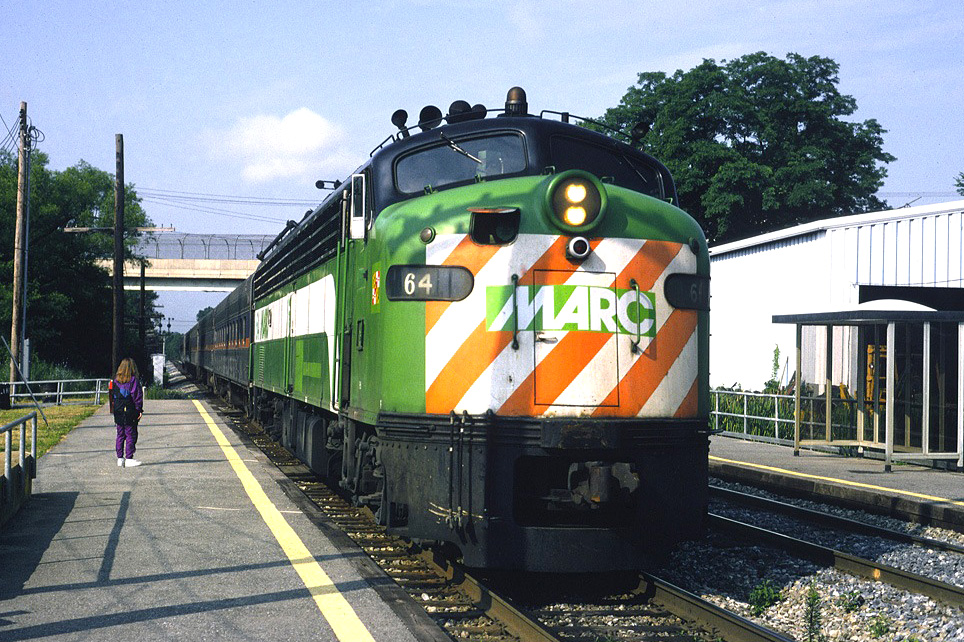
MARC train led by an EMD E9 (former Burlington Northern) at Jessup in 1994

In October 1986, MARC began testing an Amtrak AEM-7 locomotive, aiming to replace the Arrows with push–pull trains. On February 27, 1989, MARC increased Washington–Baltimore service from 7 to 13 weekday round trips. A new park-and-ride station opened at Bowie State, while the previous Bowie station was closed. Two more round trips were added in May 1989.

On May 1, 1991, MARC service was extended north from Baltimore to Perryville with intermediate stops at Martin State Airport, Edgewood, and Aberdeen. Between 1988 and 1993, MARC expanded service from 34 to 70 total daily trips across the system. In 1995, 800 parking spaces were added to Odenton station.

From 1989 to 1996, the Camden Line had high ridership growth and substantial changes to its stations. A new station at Savage just off Route 32 was opened on July 31, 1989. MARC began service to Greenbelt station on May 3, 1993, seven months before Metro began serving the station. On January 31, 1994, MARC expanded midday service on the Camden and Brunswick lines, opened Laurel Racetrack station to relieve a parking shortage at Laurel station, and closed the underused Berwyn station on the Camden Line. On December 12, 1994, Muirkirk station (originally planned as South Laurel) was opened to reduce congestion on nearby Route 1. In 1996, a $1.2 million project added 600 parking spaces at Savage station to relieve crowding. In July 1996, the Elkridge station was closed and replaced with Dorsey station, which has a larger parking area and a dedicated interchange with Route 100.

On April 30, 1987, the B&O was merged into CSX. CSX continued to operate Camden and Brunswick Line service. On July 6, 1987, MARC opened Metropolitan Grove station – the first new station on the Brunswick line in over a century.

=== 1996 Silver Spring collision ===
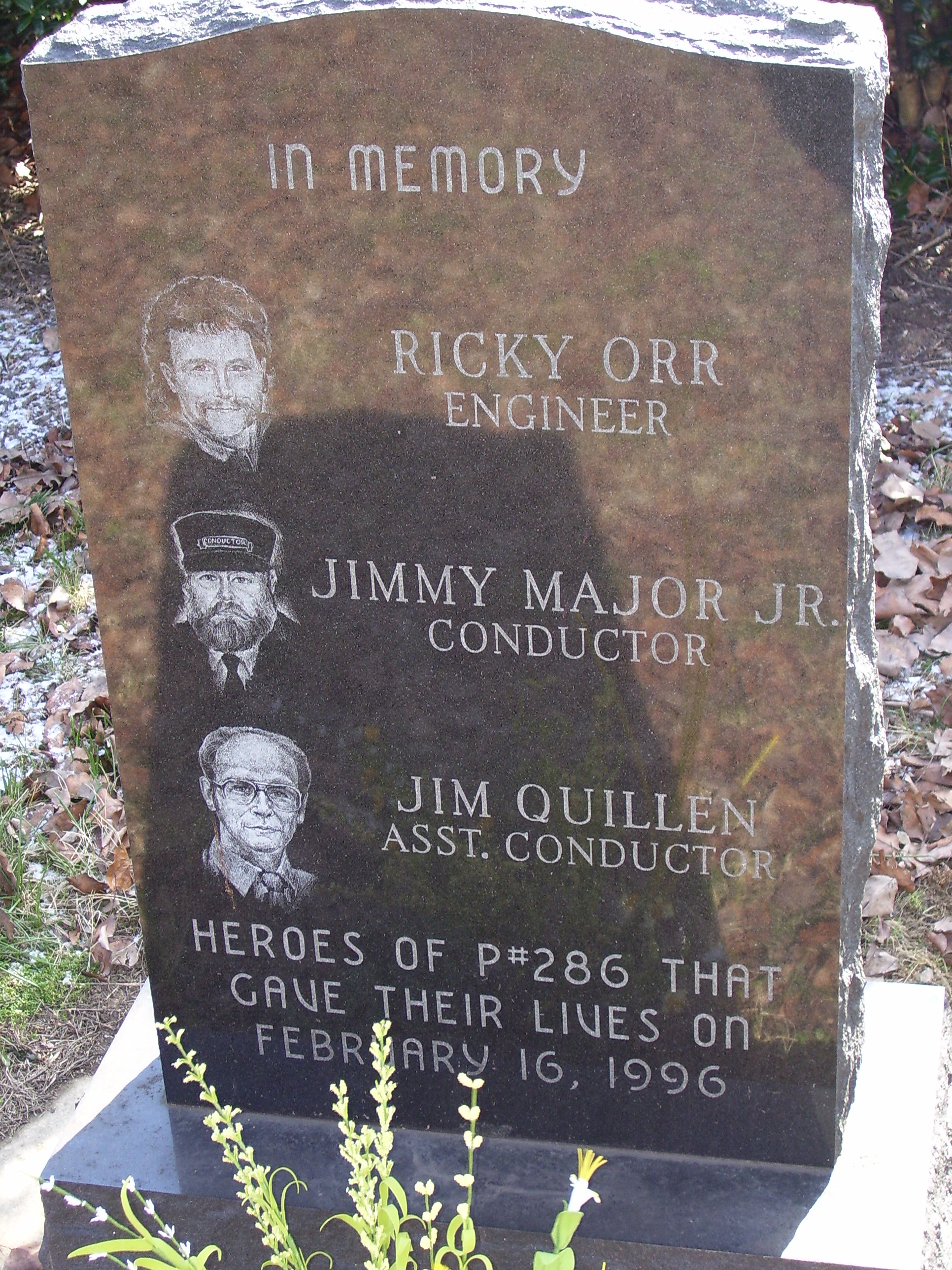
MARC Memorial on the grounds of the Brunswick train station

On February 16, 1996, during the Friday evening rush hour, an eastbound train headed to Washington Union Station via the Brunswick Line collided with the westbound Amtrak Capitol Limited headed to Chicago via Pittsburgh. The collision occurred at Georgetown Junction on a snow-swept stretch of track just west of Silver Spring, Maryland. The crash left 11 people dead aboard the MARC train. Three died of injuries suffered in the impact alone, with the rest succumbing to the ensuing smoke and flames or a combination of the two. Engineer Ricky Orr and conductors Jimmy Major Jr. and Jim Quillen were among the victims. Eight Jobs Corps students also were killed during the accident.

The NTSB report concluded that the MARC crew apparently forgot the approach signal aspect of the Kensington color-position signal after making a flag stop at Kensington station. The MARC train was operating in push mode with the cab control car out front. The Amtrak locomotives were in the crossover at the time of the collision; the MARC cab control car collided with the lead Amtrak unit, F40PH #255, rupturing its fuel tank and igniting the fire that caused most of the casualties. The second unit was a GE Genesis P40DC #811, a newer unit that has a fuel tank that is shielded in the center of the frame. The official investigation also suggests that the accident might have been prevented if a human-factors analysis had been conducted when modifications to the track signaling system were made in 1992 with the closing of nearby QN tower.

=== Operations and maintenance contracting controversy ===
In June 2010, the MTA began looking for a new operations and maintenance contractor to replace CSX Transportation for the Camden and Brunswick lines.

Controversy arose when the French-owned and Montgomery County, Maryland-based Keolis, already operating Virginia Railway Express trains, was the only bidder for the contract. The bidding process was suspended in late 2010 due to lack of competition. Before bidding reopened in 2011, Maryland passed a law requiring Keolis' majority owner, French state railway company SNCF, to fully disclose its role in transporting Jews to concentration camps during World War II, at the request of Leo Bretholz and other Holocaust survivors. This disclosure would need to meet the satisfaction of the Maryland state archivist before Keolis would be allowed to place a bid for MARC service. Keolis faced similar issues while bidding for VRE operations in 2009 before eventually being awarded the contract. Keolis and SNCF lawyers claimed that all documentation required by the law had been produced long before.

In June 2011, the future of Keolis's ability to bid on the MARC contract remained up in the air with the new disclosure law in place. No other bidder had emerged to replace CSXT. On June 5, 2011, The Washington Post ran an editorial critical of the disclosure law. The Post claimed that SNCF has been working for years on digitizing its records, and the Maryland law may require items or formats counter to SNCF's current system and/or French law. The article also stated that some in the Maryland Attorney General's Office worried the law was not Constitutional, may risk retaliation towards Maryland firms overseas, and may risk federal funding for Maryland "by imposing arbitrary procurement demands on a single company".

MTA issued a new RFP for the operations and maintenance of MARC services on the Brunswick and Camden Lines on July 14, 2011, with a deadline for proposals on November 21, 2011. The terms specified a nearly six-year base contract with a five-year renewal option. On October 17, 2012, the $204 million contract was awarded to the Canadian company Bombardier Transportation, effectively ending the Keolis controversy. The pre-service transition period began on the Thursday of that week, during which time CSXT continued to operate MARC trains. The five-year renewal was exercised in 2018. The contract passed to Alstom in 2021 when they purchased Bombardier. Alstom was awarded a $401 million, five-year contract in April 2023, with two five-year extensions possible.

== Rolling stock ==
The following tables summarize current and former MARC rolling stock.

=== Locomotives ===
Current MARC Locomotives
Manufacturer	Model	Quantity	Unit Numbers	Image	Notes
EMD	GP39PH-3C	6	70–75		Entered service in 1988; originally built as GP39H-2, then rebuilt as GP39PH-3Cs in 2023.
EMD	GP40PH-2A	1	4145		Purchased from New Jersey Transit in 2018.
EMD	GP40WH-2	1	68		Entered service in 1992; used for non-revenue work duty and rescue use.
Bombardier– Alstom	HHP-8	6	4910–4913, 4915		Entered service in 1998; 125 mph (201 km/h) maximum speed; refurbished 2017–2018. 4914 is retired and used as a parts source. Rest to be replaced with five catenary/battery-electric locomotives.
MPI	MP36PH-3C	26	10–35		Entered service 2009–2011; replaced GP40WH-2s
Siemens	Charger SC-44	8	80–87		Entered service in 2018; replaced AEM-7s; 125 mph (201 km/h) maximum speed

Former MARC Locomotives
Manufacturer	Model	Quantity	Unit Numbers	Image	Notes
EMD/ASEA	AEM-7	4	4900–4903		Replaced by the Siemens SC-44 Chargers; units placed in storage, pending disposal
EMD	GP40WH-2	19	51–69		Replaced by the MP36PH-3Cs; nos. 67–69 were rebuilt from GP40 work locomotives 30–32; no. 68 continues in non-revenue work duty and rescue use; several units rebuilt into MPI MP32PH-Q for Central Florida's SunRail commuter train; remaining units in Columbia, Pennsylvania pending rebuild by MPI or Progress Rail, Units 54, 56, 57, and 58 sold to PNLX; 69 was sold to CSX and renumbered 9969.
EMD	E9AM	10	60–69		Ex-Burlington Northern Railroad/Metra; originally built as E8As; nos. 67–68 renumbered to 91–92.
EMD	F9PH	5	81–85		Ex-Baltimore and Ohio Railroad; rebuilt by Morrison-Knudsen from former F7 locomotives; former MDOT 7181–7185.
EMD	F7 APCU	1	7100		Ex-Baltimore and Ohio Railroad F7 #4553, converted to an APCU and equipped with a generator for head-end power; occasionally served as a substitute cab car in the early 2000s; preserved at the National Museum of Railroad History & Innovation and used on the museum's railroad tour

=== Passenger cars ===
Current MARC Passenger Cars
Manufacturer	Model	Quantity	When Delivered	Car numbers	Image	Notes
Sumitomo/Nippon Sharyo	MARC IIA	16 coaches	1985–1987	7700–7715		7710–7713 are "Bike Cars" with 16 bike racks and 22 passenger seats. 7709 destroyed in 1996 Silver Spring collision
Sumitomo/Nippon Sharyo	MARC IIB	28 coaches	1991–1993	7716–7735, 7791–7799		Overhauled in 2009–2011 by Bombardier; 7720 destroyed in 1996 Silver Spring collision
Sumitomo/Nippon Sharyo	MARC IIB	6 cab cars	1991–1993	7757–7762		Overhauled in 2009–2011 by Bombardier; 7720 destroyed in 1996 Silver Spring collision
Kawasaki	MARC III	49 coaches	1999–2001	7800–7834, 7870–7876, 7890–7896		Overhauled 2018–2020 by Bombardier; nos. 7826–7834 and 7855–7858 are ex-VRE purchased in 2000, acquired by MARC in 2008
Kawasaki	MARC III	14 cab cars	1999–2001	7845–7858		Overhauled 2018–2020 by Bombardier; nos. 7826–7834 and 7855–7858 are ex-VRE purchased in 2000, acquired by MARC in 2008
Bombardier	MARC IV	39 coaches	2014	8000–8034, 8090–8094		Bombardier MultiLevel Coach
Bombardier	MARC IV	15 cab cars	2014	8045–8059		Bombardier MultiLevel Coach

Former MARC Passenger Cars
Manufacturer	Model	Quantity	When Delivered	Car numbers	Image	Notes
Budd	RDC	16	1984	1, 3, 8, 9, 11, 12, 20, 22, 23, 800, 9801, 9802, 9805, 9918, 9921, 9941		Self-propelled cars inherited from various railroads
Budd	MARC I	22	1984	100–114, 130–134, 140–149, 150–154,160–169, 190–191		Ex-Pennsylvania Railroad, Norfolk and Western Railway, NJ Transit, and SEMTA single level coaches; some used at the National Museum of Railroad History & Innovation, others sold to private operators
Sumitomo/ Nippon Sharyo	MARC IIA	11	1985–1987	Cabs: 7745–7756		Single level coaches; 7752 destroyed in 1996 Silver Spring train collision; Units have not officially retired, however they have been stored since 2020.
Pullman Standard	Gallery cars	12	2004	7900–7911		Ex-Metra gallery bilevel coaches often used on the Brunswick Line; replaced by Bombardier MARC IV in early 2015 and returned to Metra

== Proposals for service expansion ==
=== 2007 plan ===
In the first decade of the 21st century, MARC ridership increased significantly, and the system neared capacity for its current configuration. With the area population growing and the BRAC process poised to bring new jobs to Aberdeen Proving Ground and Fort Meade, both near MARC stations, the state saw the need to expand service. In September 2007, MTA Maryland unveiled an ambitious 30-year plan of system improvements. Though funding sources had not been established at that time, the plan represented the state's goals of increasing capacity and flexibility. Proposed improvements included:

- 54 Bombardier MultiLevels were ordered to replace aging single-level cars.
- Weekend service on the Penn Line. Service began on December 7, 2013, between Baltimore and Washington, D.C., with some trips extending to Martin State Airport. There are nine round trips on Saturdays (three begin and three then later end at Martin State Airport) and 6 round trips on Sundays (two begin and two then later end at Martin State Airport).
- Increased mid-day service and reverse commute service on the Camden and Brunswick Lines. As of 2015, there is a somewhat limited reverse commute service in effect on the Camden Line.
- Extension of service past Union Station in Washington to L'Enfant Plaza and to Northern Virginia along VRE routes, thus relieving pressure on the Washington Metro
- More daily trips east of Baltimore's Penn Station, including improved service to Aberdeen Proving Ground
- Service beyond Perryville to Newark or Wilmington in Delaware, providing a connection to SEPTA commuter trains to Philadelphia and beyond
- New or expanded tunnels along the Northeast Corridor in Baltimore
- New stations in Baltimore, providing direct connections with the Metro Subway, and service to Johns Hopkins Hospital and Bayview Medical Center
- Rapid transit-like service through Baltimore

Some of the proposals were foreseen to take years or decades to implement, however others such as Penn Line weekend service could have begun in a matter of months, yet budgetary shortfalls prevented this. In Spring 2009, to offset such budget shortfalls, ticket sales employees at most non-Amtrak stations were replaced with Amtrak "Quik-Trak" touchscreen ticket machines, and some train services were eliminated or scaled back. Ticket machines were also added to stations that were not previously staffed, such as Halethorpe. The only remaining staffed stations, Odenton and Frederick, remained staffed by Commuter Direct.

=== 2010s: Initial Extension Proposal to Delaware ===
In 2017, the Wilmington Area Planning Council submitted ridership studies to Cecil County, the Delaware Valley Regional Planning Commission, SEPTA and the Delaware Department of Transportation for the extension of MARC service from Perryville to Newark, Delaware, and possibly Wilmington, via Elkton. The section from Perryville to Newark is the one of only three along the Northeast Corridor not covered by commuter train service (the others are between New London, Connecticut, and Wickford Junction, Rhode Island, and between New York Penn Station and New Rochelle, New York). The Route 5 bus operated by Cecil Transit formerly connected the two stations.

=== 2020s: Extension to Delaware and Virginia Agreement ===
On April 13, 2023, MDOT announced an agreement with the Virginia Passenger Rail Authority and the Delaware Transit Corporation for expansion possibilities beyond the current termini of MARC train service. Expansion into Virginia would allow a one seat ride from Maryland to Alexandria, Virginia and to Newark, Delaware, with the latter being initially proposed in 2017 as advocated by Cecil County residents. The extension into Delaware would require further deliberations among regional partners, while the extension into Virginia would require replacing the Long Bridge over the Potomac to safely allow more train capacity, which is slated to be completed by 2030. On August 8, 2024 VRE and MDOT announced that passenger tickets will now be cross honored on both systems.

=== MARC Growth and Transformation Plan ===
In June 2025, the Maryland Transit Administration announced the release of the MARC Growth and Transformation Plan. The plan will have 3 phases. The 5-year phase(FY2026-2030), 15-Year Phase(FY2031-2040) and the unconstrained phase(FY2041 and Beyond). The plan calls for expansion of service and frequency. The plan is not yet funded.
