= Aberdeen station (Maryland) =

Train station in Aberdeen, Maryland, US

Aberdeen
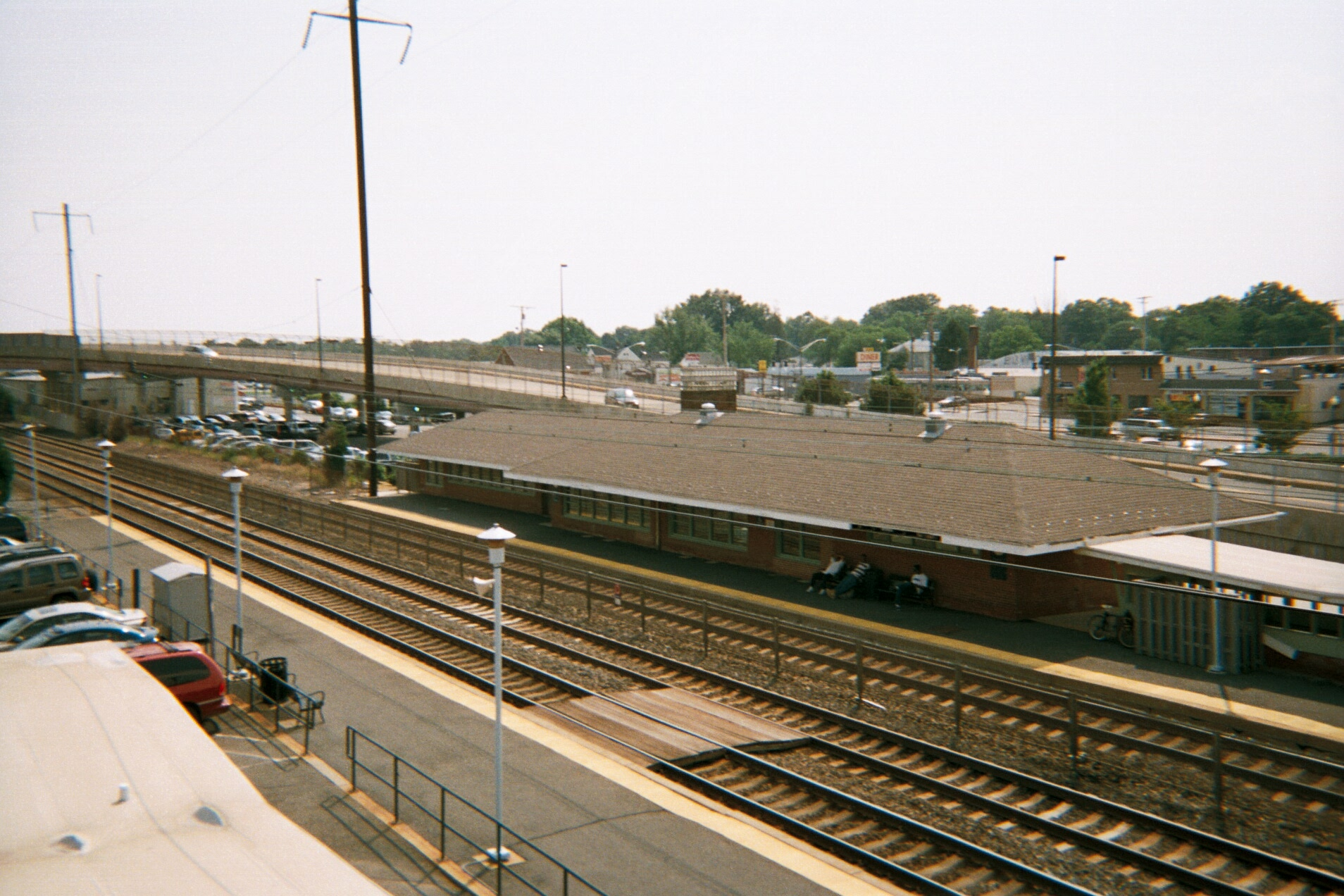
- Aberdeen station in June 2009

General information
- Location: 18 East Bel Air Avenue; Aberdeen, Maryland; United States
- Coordinates: 39.5084°N 76.1632°W
- Owner: Amtrak
- Line: Amtrak Northeast Corridor
- Platforms: 2 side platforms
- Tracks: 3
- Connections: Harford Transit: 1, 3, 4, 5, 7 MTA Maryland: Commuter Bus 420 and 425

Construction
- Parking: 189 spaces
- Cycle facilities: Racks
- Accessible: Yes

Other information
- Station code: Amtrak: ABE

History
- Opened: 1898
- Rebuilt: 1943
- Electrified: January 28, 1935 (ceremonial); February 10, 1935 (regular service)

Passengers
- FY 2025: 53,358 (Amtrak only)

Services
Preceding station	Amtrak	Following station
Baltimore toward Norfolk, Newport News or Roanoke	Northeast Regional	Newark, Delaware toward Boston South or Springfield
Acela does not stop here
Cardinal does not stop here
Carolinian does not stop here
Crescent does not stop here
Palmetto does not stop here
Silver Meteor does not stop here
Vermonter does not stop here
Preceding station	MARC	Following station
Edgewood toward Union Station	Penn Line	Perryville Terminus
Former services
Preceding station	Amtrak	Following station
Edgewood toward Washington, D.C.	Chesapeake	Perryville toward Philadelphia–Suburban
Baltimore toward Tri-State	Hilltopper	Wilmington toward Boston South
Preceding station	Pennsylvania Railroad	Following station
Short Lane toward Washington, D.C.	Philadelphia, Wilmington and Baltimore Railroad	Swan Creek toward Philadelphia
Location

Aberdeen station is a train station in Aberdeen, Maryland, on the Northeast Corridor. It is served by Amtrak Northeast Regional intercity service and MARC Penn Line commuter service. The station has two side platforms serving the outer tracks of the three-track Northeast Corridor, with a station building on the north side of the tracks.

== History ==
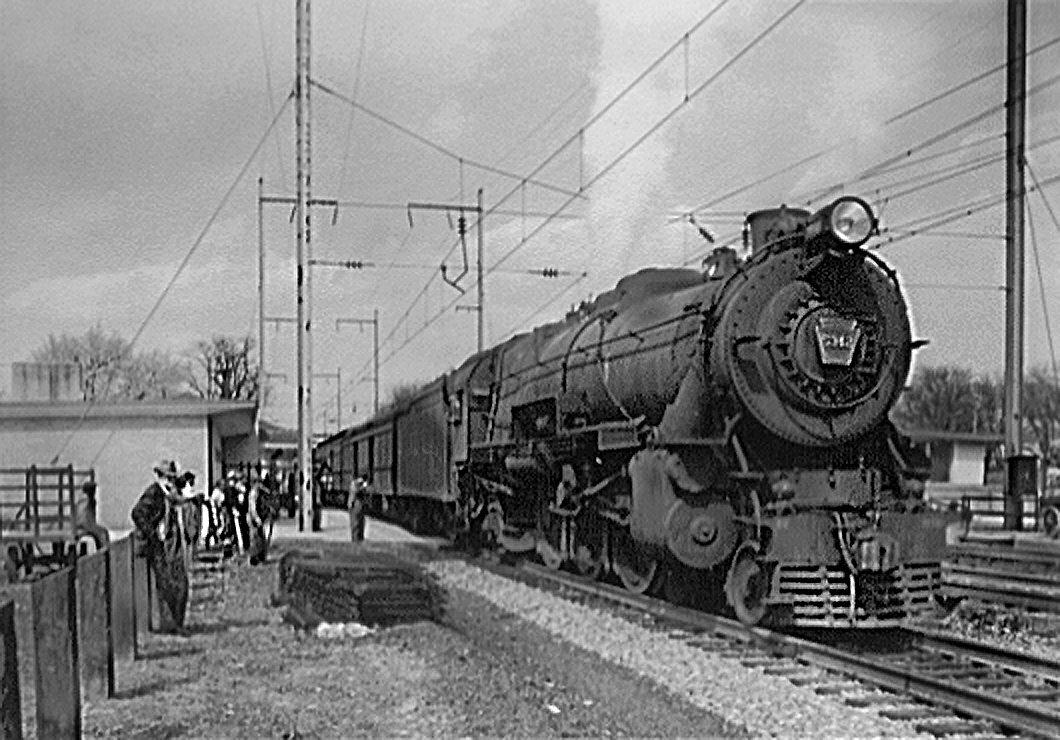
A PRR passenger train at Aberdeen station in 1944

The station was originally built by the Philadelphia, Wilmington and Baltimore Railroad approximately in 1898, and inherited by the Philadelphia, Baltimore and Washington Railroad. The current station is a modern structure built in 1943 by Lester C. Tichy (1905–1981) for the Pennsylvania Railroad, It contains a 1960s-style pedestrian tunnel, with one of the entrances located at the former north station house. It also contains a pedestrian bridge built in 1982. Aberdeen was also served by an 1886-built Baltimore and Ohio Railroad station along what is now the CSX Philadelphia Subdivision just north of this one on West Bel Air Avenue. Prior to the mid-1980s there was a grade crossing located next to the station. It was removed after Amtrak completed the Northeast Corridor Improvement Project and replaced with an overpass.

MARC Penn Line service was extended to Perryville on May 1, 1991, with intermediate stops at Aberdeen, Edgewood, and Martin State Airport. The station was restored in 1993 at a cost of $400,000. The work included a new roof for the fire-damaged building.
