= Edgewood station (MARC) =

Edgewood
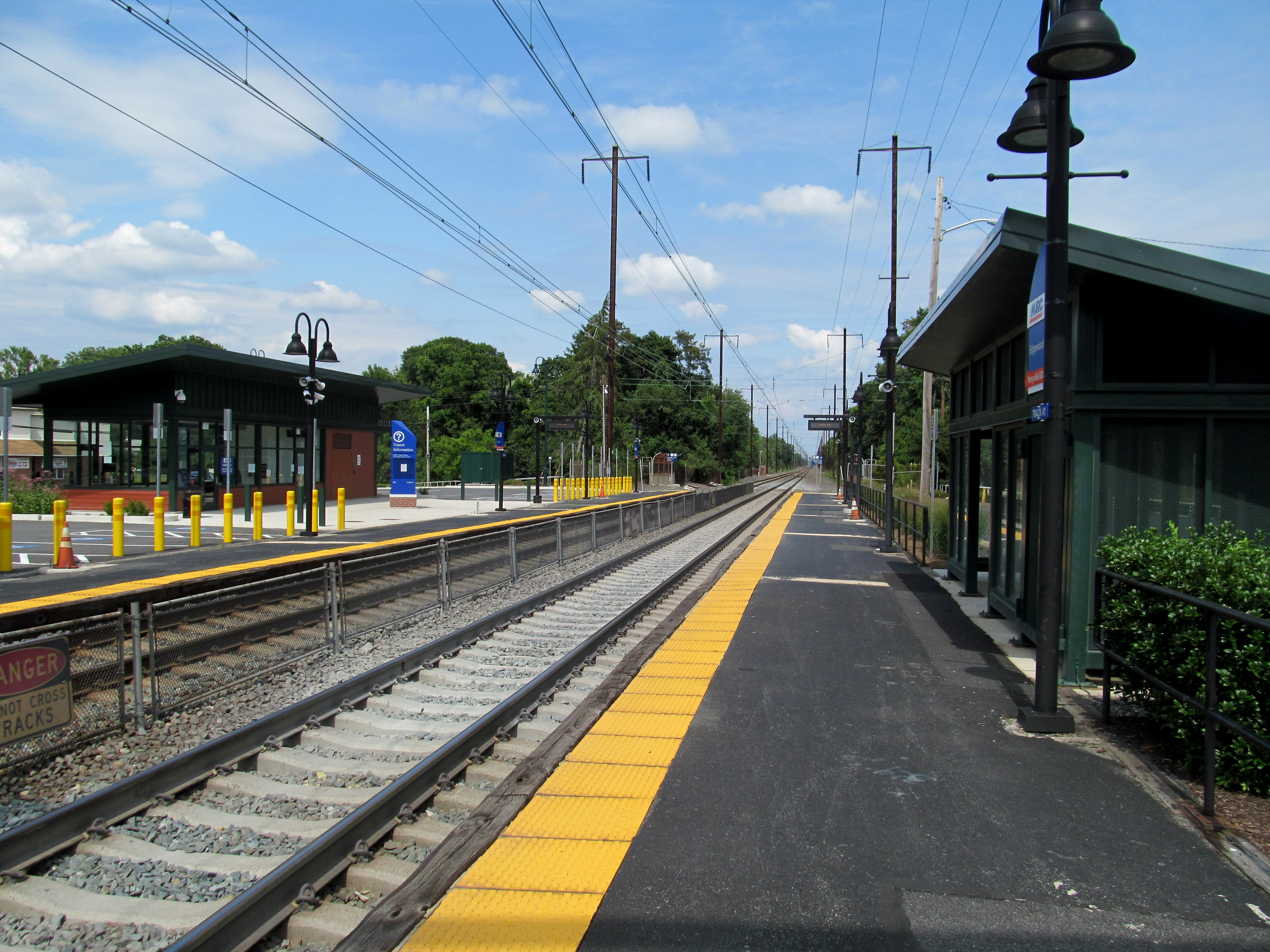
- Edgewood station platform, looking northbound in July 2014. The station building is at left and the smaller northbound shelter at right.

General information
- Location: 2127 Old Edgewood Road; Edgewood, Maryland
- Coordinates: 39°24′58″N 76°17′34″W
- Owner: Amtrak
- Operator: Maryland Transit Administration
- Line: Amtrak Northeast Corridor
- Platforms: 2 side platforms
- Tracks: 2
- Connections: Harford Transit: 2 (Blue), 7 (Red)

Construction
- Parking: 295 spaces
- Accessible: Yes

History
- Opened: May 1, 1991

Passengers
- 2018: 271 daily ▲5.9%

Services
Preceding station	MARC	Following station
Martin State Airport toward Union Station	Penn Line	Aberdeen toward Perryville
Former services
Preceding station	Amtrak	Following station
Baltimore toward Washington, D.C.	Chesapeake 1978–1983	Aberdeen toward Philadelphia–Suburban
Preceding station	Pennsylvania Railroad	Following station
Magnolia toward Washington, D.C.	Philadelphia, Wilmington and Baltimore Railroad	Otter Point toward Philadelphia
Location

Edgewood station is a passenger rail station on the Northeast Corridor in the unincorporated community of Edgewood, Maryland, served by the MARC Penn Line. Edgewood station serves the southern terminus of Maryland Route 755 which terminates at an entrance to the Aberdeen Proving Ground. The station has two side platforms with a small station building north of the tracks. Parking is located on either side of the station area.

== History ==
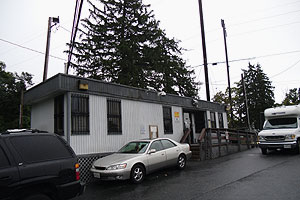
The trailer station building in 2011

The former Edgewood station of the Pennsylvania Railroad was designed by architect Lester C. Tichy in association with designer Raymond Loewy. The station is also located east of Amtrak's Edgewood Interlocking Tower, previously owned by the Pennsylvania Railroad.

MARC Penn Line service was extended to Perryville on May 1, 1991, with intermediate stops at Aberdeen, Edgewood, and Martin State Airport. A modular trailer served as the Edgewood station building. The parking lot was enlarged from 150 spaces to 291 spaces in 2005. In October 2006, the state announced plans for a new station building at Edgewood. Construction of the $5 million project began in September 2011 and was completed in late 2012. It included a new station building with restrooms and ticket machines, a shelter on the northbound platform, repaving of the station platforms, and ramps to the Edgewood Road underpass.

Between 2001 and 2003, a single southbound Amtrak Northeast Regional train began stopping at Edgewood to supplement regular MARC service. The stop at Edgewood was for MARC passengers only and was not listed in Amtrak timetables. Amtrak service at Edgewood was suspended in March 2020 when Amtrak reduced service due to the COVID-19 pandemic.
