= Newark station (Delaware) =

Train station in Newark, Delaware

Newark
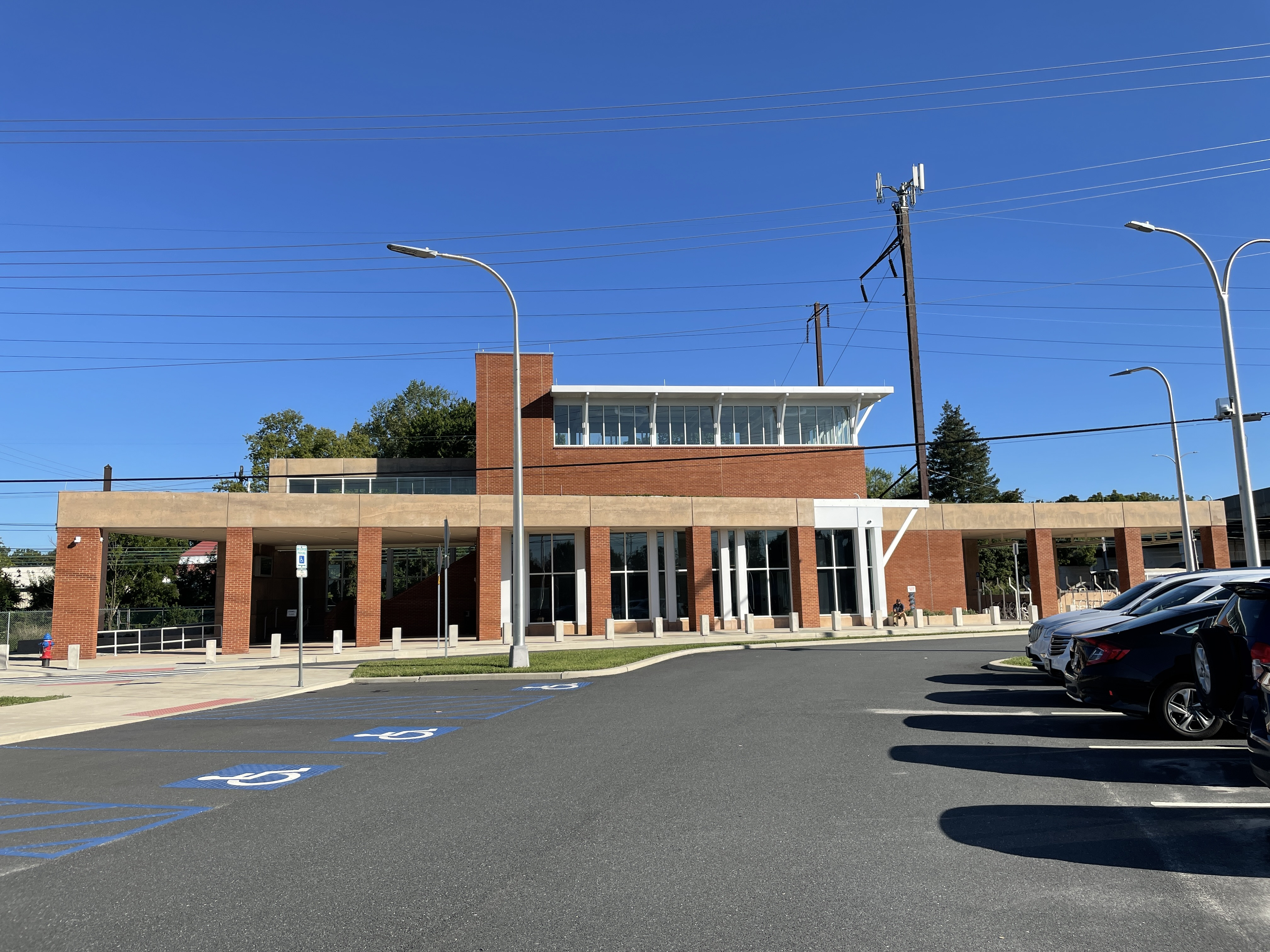
- Newark station in September 2021

General information
- Other names: Thomas R. Carper Station
- Location: 10 Mopar Drive; Newark, Delaware; United States
- Coordinates: 39°40′13″N 75°45′11″W
- Owner: DART First State
- Line: Amtrak Northeast Corridor
- Platforms: 2 side platforms
- Tracks: 4
- Connections: DART First State: 10, 33, 46, DART Connect; Cecil Transit: 4; FlixBus; James F. Hall Trail

Construction
- Parking: 256 spaces
- Cycle facilities: 5 rack spaces
- Accessible: Yes

Other information
- Station code: Amtrak: NRK; SEPTA: 90201
- Fare zone: 4 (SEPTA)

History
- Opened: 1877
- Electrified: January 28, 1935 (ceremonial); February 10, 1935 (regular service)

Passengers
- FY 2025: 49,510 (Amtrak)
- 2017: 318 boardings, 238 alightings (weekday average) (SEPTA)
- Rank: 85 of 146 (SEPTA)

Services
Preceding station	Amtrak	Following station
Aberdeen toward Norfolk, Newport News or Roanoke	Northeast Regional	Wilmington toward Boston South or Springfield
Acela does not stop here
Cardinal does not stop here
Carolinian does not stop here
Crescent does not stop here
Palmetto does not stop here
Silver Meteor does not stop here
Vermonter does not stop here
Preceding station	SEPTA	Following station
Terminus	Wilmington/Newark Line	Churchmans Crossing toward Temple University
Former services
Preceding station	Amtrak	Following station
Elkton toward Washington, D.C.	Chesapeake	Wilmington toward Philadelphia–Suburban
Preceding station	Pennsylvania Railroad	Following station
Iron Hill toward Washington, D.C.	Philadelphia, Wilmington and Baltimore Railroad	Ruthby toward Philadelphia
Proposed services
Preceding station	MARC	Following station
Elkton toward Union Station	Penn Line	Terminus
- Newark Passenger Station
- U.S. National Register of Historic Places
- Area: 0.1 acres (0.04 ha)
- Built: 1877
- Built by: Philadelphia, Wilmington and Baltimore Railroad
- Architect: S. T. Fuller
- Architectural style: Late Victorian, High Victorian
- MPS: Newark MRA
- NRHP reference No.: 82002346
- Added to NRHP: May 7, 1982
Location

Newark station, also known as Thomas R. Carper Station, is a train station in Newark, Delaware, on Amtrak's Northeast Corridor, serving a limited number of Amtrak Northeast Regional trains and SEPTA's Wilmington/Newark Line regional rail trains.

== Service ==
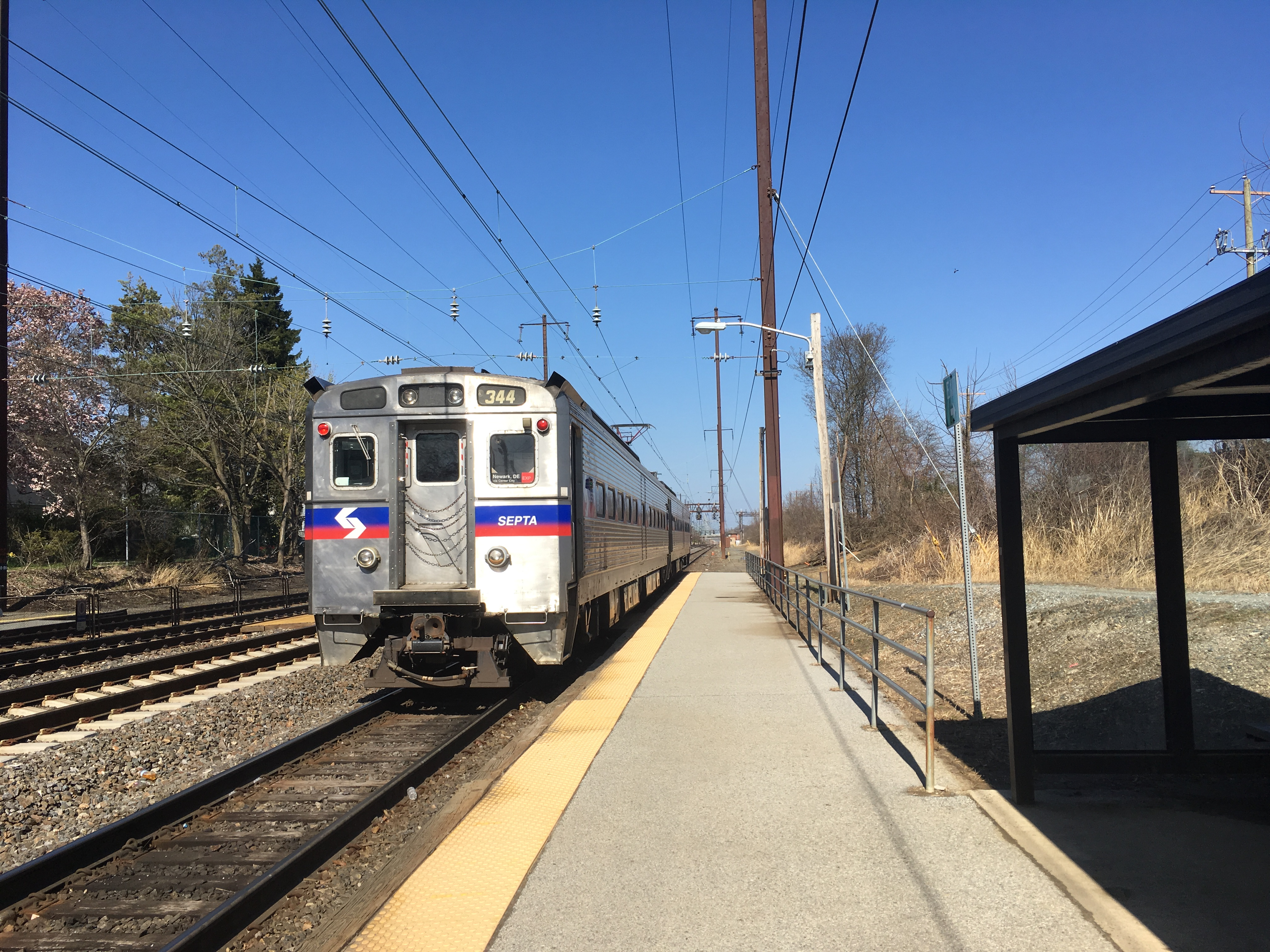
A SEPTA train at Newark in 2018

The Newark station is the southern terminus of weekday service for SEPTA's Wilmington/Newark Line; it does not serve the station on weekends or holidays. Like all stations in Delaware, SEPTA service is provided under contract and funded through DART First State. Amtrak Northeast Regional service at Newark station is limited; the station sees one train in each direction on weekdays, an additional northbound train on Thursdays and Fridays and an additional southbound train on Fridays, and three trains in each direction on weekends.

The station is located at Mopar Drive and South College Avenue, and travelers arriving at the station must walk a few blocks north along South College Avenue to reach the University of Delaware or the businesses centered on Main Street. A 380 space parking lot exists, mostly serving park and ride passengers bound for Wilmington, Delaware, or Philadelphia, Pennsylvania. The James F. Hall Trail also runs along the north side of the tracks.

== History ==
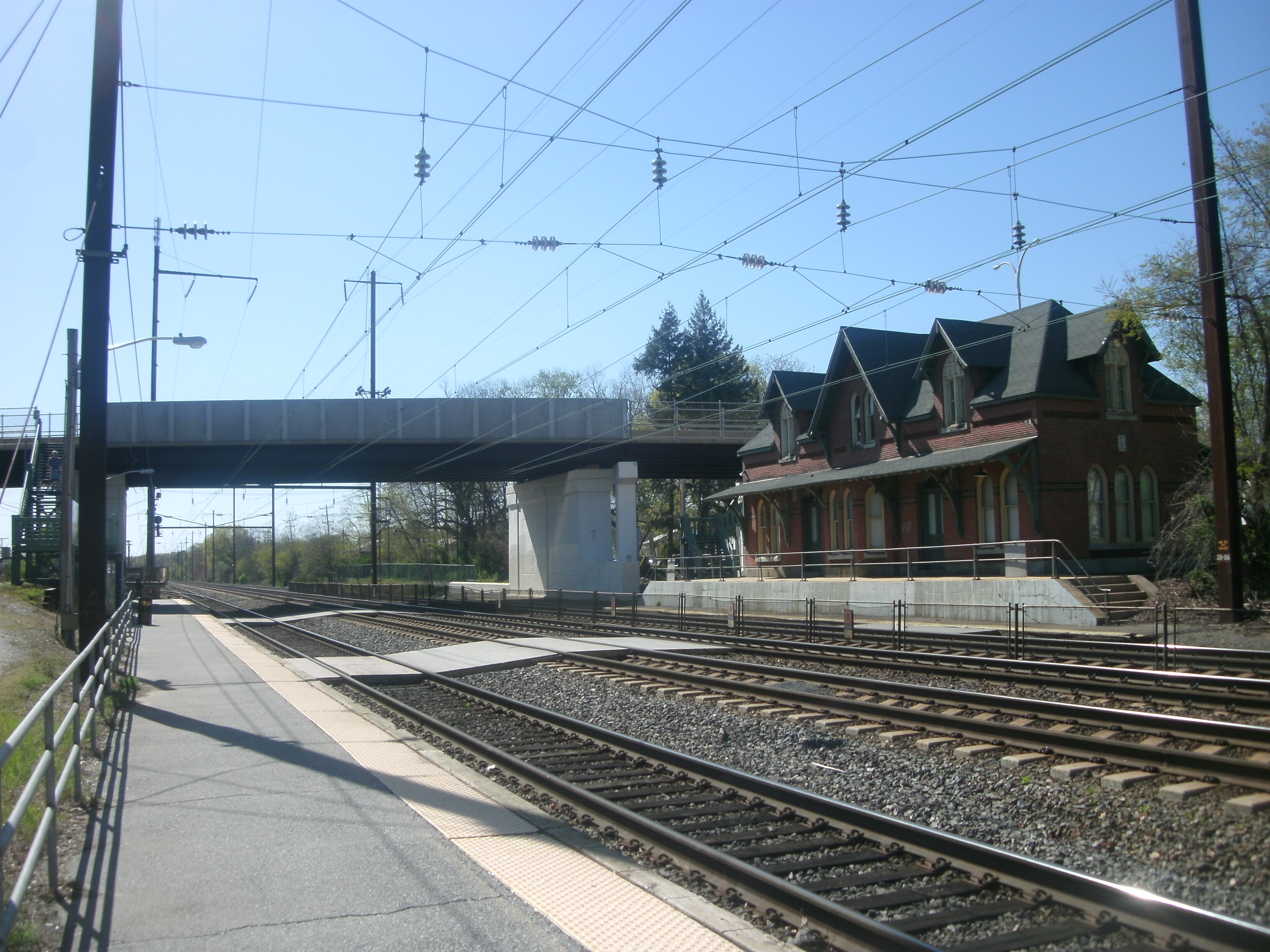
The original Newark station building in April 2012

The original station building, originally constructed by the Philadelphia, Wilmington and Baltimore Railroad in 1877, is adjacent to the southbound platform, and at one time also had connecting branches to Pomeroy, Pennsylvania and Delaware City, Delaware. It is now home to the Newark Historical Society, but does not function as a train station. It has been listed on the National Register of Historic Places since May 7, 1982. The station is built on a "T" plan with a hipped cross-gable roof and Victorian detailing such as ornamental brackets and sawtooth brickwork.

In 1986, Newark's city council authorized an application for a state of Delaware Bicentennial Improvement Fund grant for the acquisition and redevelopment of the Newark station, and on March 27, 1987, Amtrak deeded the station building to the city. By September, the city had hired John Milner Associates of West Chester, Pa., to develop architectural specifications for restoration. Restoration work encompassed the first floor ticket booths, the ladies' and men's waiting rooms, modernized upstairs offices, and rebuilt canopies on the exterior. SEPTA service was extended to Newark on September 2, 1997.

In 2012 a new federal grant was awarded to upgrade the station into a multi-modal hub. This includes new platform, eliminating grade crossings, upgrades to the adjacent rail yard and new ticketing machines.

Track upgrades to increase capacity between Newark and Wilmington rebuilt and reconfigured interlockings and added a third track to 1.5 miles of the line. Construction on these track upgrades was completed in 2020.

On July 17, 2017, construction began on a project that will add new tracks, accessible platforms and a new station building. A groundbreaking ceremony was held with Governor John Carney, U.S. Senators Tom Carper and Chris Coons, and U.S. Representative Lisa Blunt Rochester in attendance. The first phase of the project added more parking spaces and reconfigured the intersection with South College Avenue at the station. The second phase constructed the new station building, which has restrooms, a waiting area, and parking for bicycles. A covered pedestrian bridge is also planned to be constructed over the tracks. The new station will have a high-level accessible platform between two tracks, allowing the station to serve two trains at one time. On May 30, 2018, a groundbreaking ceremony was held for the new station building, with Governor Carney and Senator Carper in attendance. The new station building was completed in 2020. Construction of rail upgrades and the new platform have yet to take place; the Delaware Department of Transportation is working with Amtrak to finalize funding and the timeline of construction. The project will allow for the expansion of SEPTA service at the station and for a possible extension of MARC service from Maryland.

On May 17, 2024, Delaware state legislature renamed Newark Station in honor of Senator Carper, citing his advocacy for investment in passenger rail service during his tenure as Senator.

== Proposed MARC expansion ==
The Maryland Area Rail Commuter (MARC) has proposed expanding its service to Newark station, which would connect MARC and SEPTA service (this would close the gap between Newark and Perryville, Maryland which is not served by any commuter rail service along the Northeast Corridor). The June 2025 MARC Growth and Transformation plan outlines a plan to reopen Elkton Station (to the southwest of Newark) and expand MARC service to Wilmington, DE. Service to Newark would be part of the MARC Penn Line. The extension of the Penn Line into Delaware will be complete by 2040, according to preliminary projections.

== See also ==
- National Register of Historic Places listings in Newark, Delaware
