= Chesapeake (train) =

1978–1983 Amtrak commuter train from Washington to Philadelphia

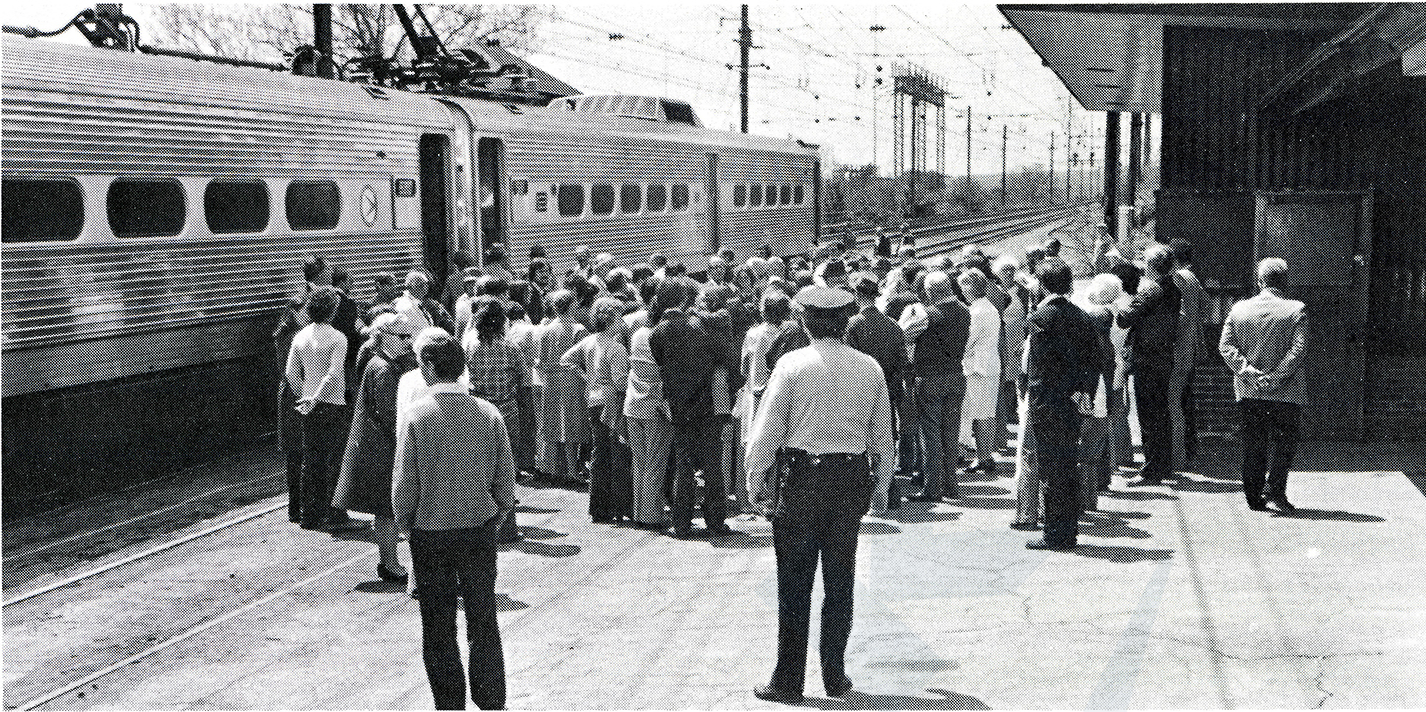
- Demonstration run of the Chesapeake on April 30, 1978, the day before regular service began

Overview
- Service type: Commuter rail
- Status: Discontinued
- Locale: Mid-Atlantic states
- First service: May 1, 1978
- Last service: October 29, 1983
- Successor: SEPTA; MARC Train
- Former operator: Amtrak

Route
- Termini: Washington, D.C. Philadelphia
- Distance travelled: 134 miles (216 km)
- Average journey time: 2 hour 18 minutes
- Service frequency: Monday through Friday
- Train number: 420, 421

On-board services
- Class: Unreserved coach

Technical
- Rolling stock: Arrow
- Track gauge: 4 ft 8 1/2 in (1,435 mm)
- Electrification: 11.5 kV 25 Hz AC Overhead catenary
- Track owner: Amtrak

The Chesapeake was a daily passenger train operated by Amtrak along the Northeast Corridor between Washington, D.C. and Philadelphia, Pennsylvania, from 1978 until 1983. It was one of the few commuter trains operated by Amtrak.

== History ==
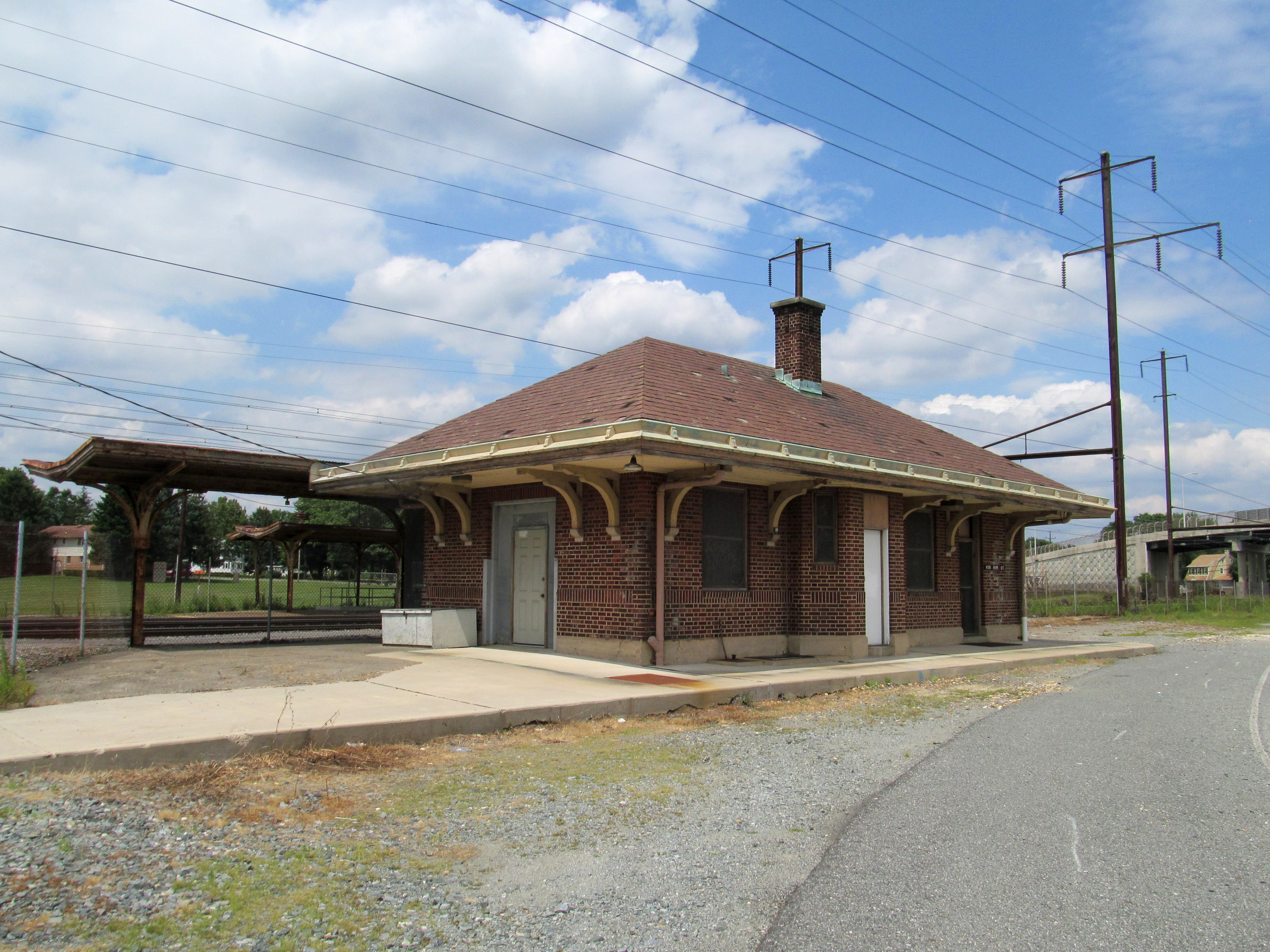
Elkton station is the only former Chesapeake station not currently served by Amtrak, MARC, or SEPTA.

The Chesapeake began operation on May 1, 1978, with funding from the Commonwealth of Pennsylvania and the State of Maryland. A demonstration trip ran from Philadelphia to Bowie on April 30. It was the first service at Elkton since 1967. BWI Rail Station was added to the service when it opened in October 1980. From February 4, 1980, to October 25, 1981, the Chesapeake was extended from 30th Street to Suburban Station.

The train primarily served higher-ranking business executives and government officials on the southbound trip in the morning, as it arrived too late for most civil servants. The northbound trip primarily served the latter group, as it departed too early to serve the morning riders for their return trip.

On January 1, 1983, Conrail was relieved of its obligation to run commuter service. Commuter service in Pennsylvania was merged into SEPTA Regional Rail, and MDOT contracted with Amtrak to run other Washington–Baltimore commuter trips. The Chesapeake was discontinued on October 30, 1983 and replaced by an unnamed Washington–Baltimore train. Commuter rail service is now provided over the former route of the Chesapeake – excepting the segment between Perryville and Newark – by the SEPTA Wilmington/Newark Line and MARC Penn Line.

== Equipment ==
The Chesapeake operated with leased Arrow electric multiple units.

== Station stops ==
The following station stops were made by Chesapeake trains during the October 1980 to October 1981 period:

State	City	Station	Notes
Pennsylvania	Philadelphia	Suburban Station	Now a Wilmington/Newark Line stop
Pennsylvania	Philadelphia	30th Street Station	Now an Amtrak and Wilmington/Newark Line stop
Pennsylvania	Chester	Chester Transit Center	Now a Wilmington/Newark Line stop
Delaware	Wilmington	Wilmington	Now an Amtrak and Wilmington/Newark Line stop
Delaware	Newark	Newark	Now an Amtrak and Wilmington/Newark Line stop
Maryland	Elkton	Elkton	
Maryland	Perryville	Perryville	Now a Penn Line stop
Maryland	Aberdeen	Aberdeen	Now a Penn Line and Amtrak stop
Maryland	Edgewood	Edgewood	Now a Penn Line stop
Maryland	Baltimore	Pennsylvania Station	Now a Penn Line and Amtrak stop
Maryland	Baltimore	Edmondson	Its replacement, West Baltimore, is now a Penn Line stop
Maryland	Linthicum	Baltimore Airport	Now a Penn Line and Amtrak stop
Maryland	Odenton	Odenton	Now a Penn Line stop
Maryland	Bowie	Bowie	Its 1989 replacement, Bowie State, is now a Penn Line stop
Maryland	Lanham	Capital Beltway	Its 1983 replacement, New Carrollton, is now an Amtrak and Penn Line stop
Washington, D.C.		Union Station	Now Penn Line and Amtrak stop

== See also ==
- List of Amtrak routes#Northeast Corridor for other Amtrak trains named Chesapeake.
