= Martin State Airport station =

Train station in Middle River, Maryland, US

Martin State Airport
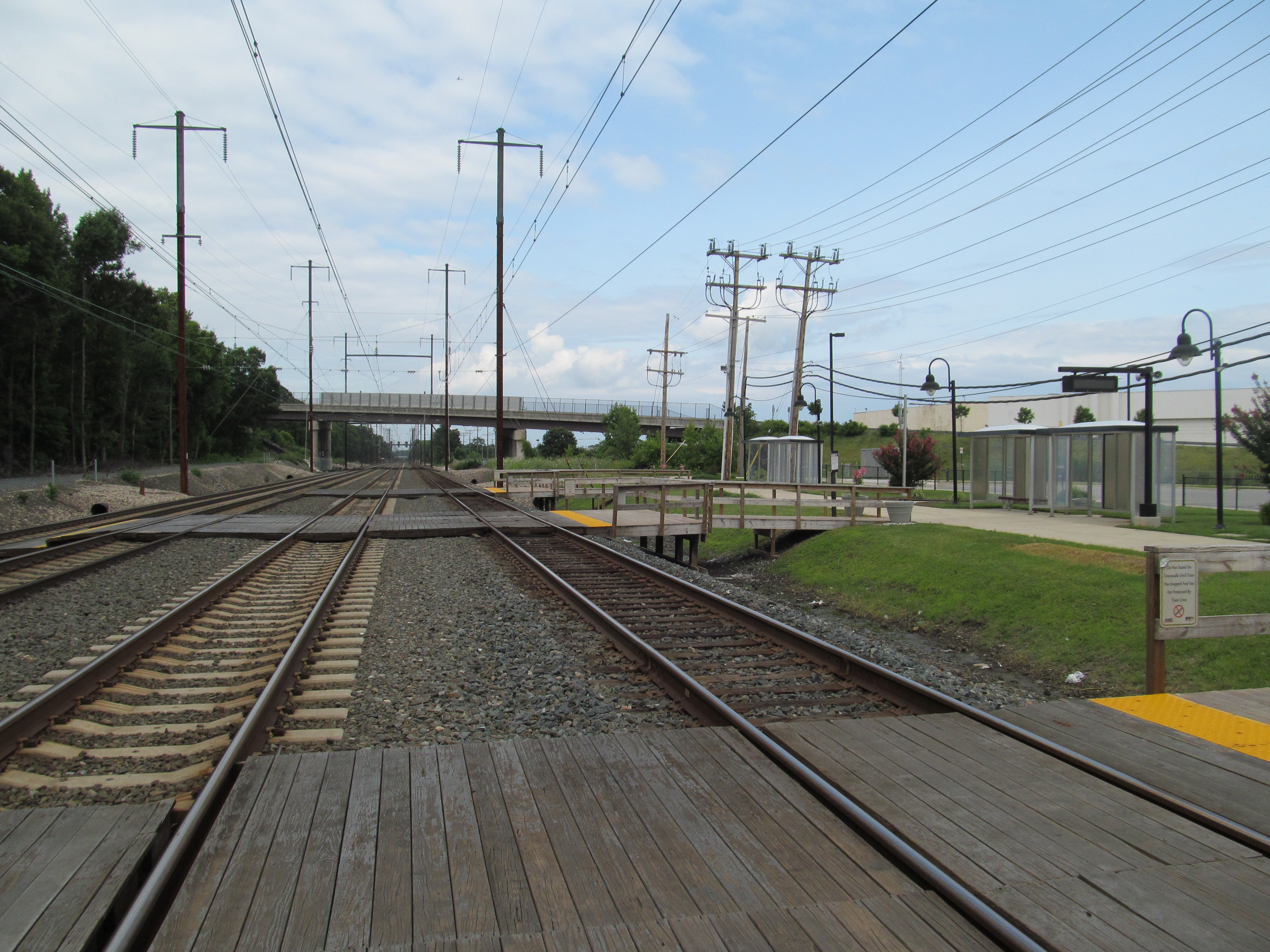
- Martin State Airport station in July 2014

General information
- Location: 2710 Eastern Boulevard; Middle River, Maryland
- Coordinates: 39.3383°N 76.4196°W
- Owner: Amtrak
- Operator: Maryland Transit Administration
- Line: Amtrak Northeast Corridor
- Platforms: 1 side platform
- Tracks: 4
- Connections: MTA BaltimoreLink: 59, 160

Construction
- Parking: 320 spaces
- Accessible: No

History
- Opened: May 1, 1991

Passengers
- 2018: 320 daily ▼17.5%

Services
Preceding station	MARC	Following station
Penn Station toward Union Station	Penn Line	Edgewood toward Perryville
Location

Martin State Airport station is a passenger rail station on the Northeast Corridor serving Martin State Airport in the unincorporated community of Middle River, Maryland. It is located in between the Aberdeen and Baltimore stations. It is served by the MARC Penn Line; Amtrak trains pass through the station without stopping.

== History ==
MARC Penn Line service was extended to Perryville on May 1, 1991, with intermediate stops at Aberdeen, Edgewood, and Martin State Airport.

The station has three sections of wooden platform adjacent to the southern track of the four-track Northeast Corridor. The wooden decks extend across the tracks to allow passengers access to all tracks. The station is not accessible. A 2010 state study proposed to move the station to the northeast of White Marsh Boulevard. It would have two 800-foot (240 m) platforms – a side platform adjacent to the northernmost track (Track 3) and an island platform between the southern tracks (Track 1 and Track A). The platforms would be provisioned for future expansion to 1,000 feet (300 m). The study also consider potential transit oriented development around the station, including reuse of an existing General Services Administration-owned storage building.

In 2022–2023, the Maryland Transit Administration was awarded a $7.11 million Federal Transit Administration grant for design and environmental work for the station reconstruction. As of September 2023, the $8.91 million phase of work (including $1.8 million of state funds) was expected to last from July 2025 to July 2027.
