= Baltimore Penn Station =

Intercity rail station in Maryland

Baltimore Penn Station Baltimore, MD
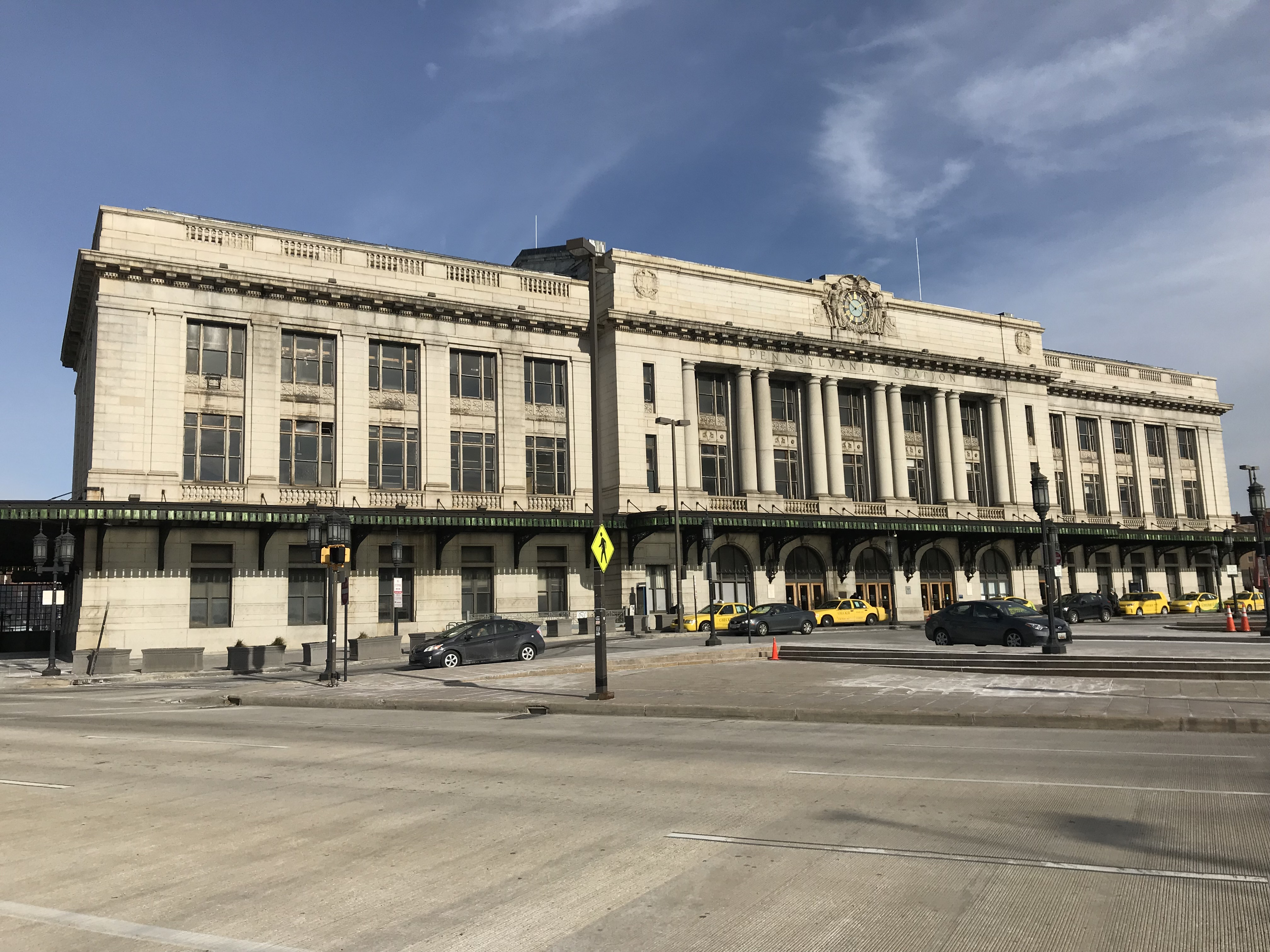
- Baltimore Penn Station in 2018

General information
- Location: 1500 North Charles Street; Baltimore, Maryland; United States
- Coordinates: 39°18′27″N 76°36′56″W
- Owner: Amtrak
- Line: Amtrak Northeast Corridor
- Platforms: 3 island platforms (MARC and Amtrak); 1 side platform (Light RailLink)
- Tracks: 8 (MARC and Amtrak); 1 (Light RailLink)
- Connections: MTA BaltimoreLink: Green, Silver, 51, 95, 103; Charm City Circulator: Purple; Johns Hopkins Shuttle; Baltimore Collegetown Shuttle; Jones Falls Trail

Construction
- Parking: 550 spaces
- Accessible: Yes

Other information
- Station code: Amtrak: BAL
- IATA code: ZBP
- Website: baltimorepennstation.com

History
- Opened: 1911
- Rebuilt: 1984
- Former names: Baltimore Union Station

Passengers
- FY 2025: 1,333,185 (Amtrak only)

Services
Preceding station	Amtrak	Following station
BWI Airport toward Washington, D.C.	Acela	Wilmington toward Boston South
BWI Airport toward Washington, D.C.	Vermonter	Wilmington toward St. Albans
Washington, D.C. toward Chicago	Cardinal	Wilmington toward New York
Washington, D.C. toward Charlotte	Carolinian	Wilmington toward New York
BWI Airport toward New Orleans	Crescent	Wilmington toward New York
BWI Airport toward Savannah	Palmetto	Wilmington toward New York
Washington, D.C. toward Miami	Silver Meteor	Wilmington toward New York
BWI Airport toward Norfolk, Newport News or Roanoke	Northeast Regional	Aberdeen toward Boston South or Springfield
Preceding station	MARC	Following station
West Baltimore toward Union Station	Penn Line	Martin State Airport toward Perryville
Preceding station	Maryland Transit Administration	Following station
Mt. Royal/MICA toward Camden Yards	Light RailLink Penn–Camden Shuttle	Terminus
Former services
Preceding station	Amtrak	Following station
Edmondson toward Washington, D.C.	Chesapeake	Edgewood toward Philadelphia–Suburban
New Carrollton toward Tri-State	Hilltopper	Aberdeen toward Boston South
BWI Airport toward Washington, D.C.	Metroliner	Wilmington toward New York
New Carrollton toward Washington, D.C.	Montrealer	Wilmington toward Montreal
Capital Beltway toward Washington, D.C.	Montrealer	Wilmington toward Montreal
Harrisburg toward Kansas City	National Limited	Capital Beltway toward Washington, D.C.
Washington, D.C. toward Miami	Silver Star	Wilmington toward New York
Preceding station	Pennsylvania Railroad	Following station
Edmondson Avenue toward Washington, D.C.	Philadelphia, Wilmington and Baltimore Railroad	Biddle Street toward Philadelphia
President Street toward Calvert Street	Philadelphia, Wilmington and Baltimore Railroad	Biddle Street toward Philadelphia
Woodberry toward Harrisburg	Northern Central Railway; Baltimore Division	Calvert Street Terminus
Preceding station	Western Maryland Railway	Following station
Baltimore Walbrook toward Cumberland	Main Line	Baltimore Hillen Terminus
- Pennsylvania Station
- U.S. National Register of Historic Places
- Baltimore City Landmark
- Interactive map of Pennsylvania Station
- Area: 1.9 acres (0.8 ha)
- Built: 1911
- Architects: McKim, Mead & White; Kenneth MacKenzie Murchison
- Architectural style: Beaux-Arts
- NRHP reference No.: 75002097

Significant dates
- Added to NRHP: September 12, 1975
- Designated BCL: 1975
Location

Baltimore Penn Station—formally, Baltimore Pennsylvania Station—is the main inter-city passenger rail hub in Baltimore, Maryland. Designed by New York City architect Kenneth MacKenzie Murchison (1872–1938), it was constructed in 1911 in the Beaux-Arts style of architecture for the Pennsylvania Railroad. It is located at 1515 N. Charles Street, about a mile and a half north of downtown and the Inner Harbor, between the Mount Vernon neighborhood to the south, and Station North to the north. Originally called Union Station because it served the Pennsylvania Railroad and Western Maryland Railway, it was renamed to match the PRR's other main stations in 1928.

The building sits on a raised "island" of sorts between two open trenches, one for the Jones Falls Expressway and the other for the tracks of the Northeast Corridor (NEC). The NEC approaches from the south through the Baltimore and Potomac Tunnel and the east through the Union Tunnel.

== Services ==
Amtrak owns the station, which is used by eight of its Northeast Corridor services. These include multiple daily Acela and Northeast Regional trains; daily round trips of the Carolinian, Crescent, Palmetto, Silver Meteor, and Vermonter; and the tri-weekly Cardinal. Penn Station is the northern terminus for most MARC Train Penn Line service, though some service runs further north to Perryville. It is also the northern terminus of Baltimore Light RailLink's Penn–Camden shuttle, which uses a single-track spur to Penn Station.

== History ==
=== 20th century ===
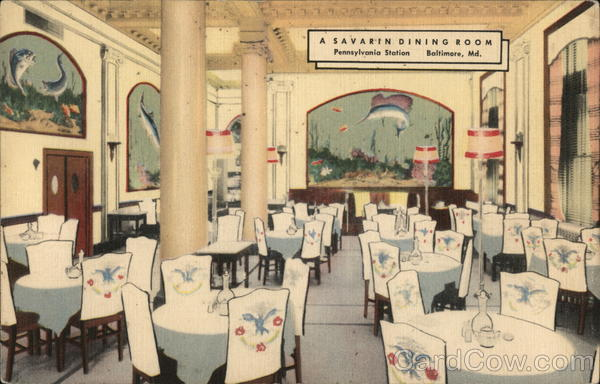
Savarin Restaurant at Baltimore Penn Station, c. 1930s

The present Pennsylvania Station is the third railroad depot on its North Charles Street site. The first one was a wooden structure built by the Northern Central Railway, a subsidiary of the Pennsylvania Railroad (PRR), that began operating in 1873. This was replaced in 1886 by the Charles Street Union Station, which featured a three-story brick building situated below street level with a sloping driveway that led to its entrance and a train shed that measured 76 by 360 feet (23.16 by 109.73 meters). It was demolished in January 1910, for construction of the present edifice, which opened on September 15, 1911.

Between the 1920s and 1940s, Savarin Restaurants provided full-service dining rooms at Baltimore Pennsylvania Station, Washington Union Station, and others. The Savarin Restaurant, located at the west end of Baltimore's station, was originally decorated with Chesapeake Bay-themed murals and had an entrance and exterior signage directly fronting Charles Street. By the early 1960s, the Savarin had ended table service and offered counter-service only.

The PRR operated local and intercity service on both the Northeast Corridor and the Northern Central. Northeast Corridor service included the PRR's own trains, as well as long-distance trains from southern railroads. The northeast Corridor was electrified through the station in 1935. Service on the Northern Central ended in the late 1960s. Penn Station was used by the Western Maryland Railway until 1958. The Baltimore and Ohio Railroad instead used nearby Mount Royal Station until 1961, while the Maryland and Pennsylvania Railroad used a small station at North Avenue until 1954.

On September 23, 1952, Richard Nixon, then a U.S. senator from California and the Republican Party's nominee for vice president, gave what became known as the Checkers speech, in which he said his dog Checkers had been held for him at "Union Station in Baltimore," the station's former name.

==== Penn Central and Amtrak ====
The Penn Central was formed in 1968 through the merger of the Pennsylvania Railroad and New York Central Railroad. The company soon faced financial difficulties and filed for bankruptcy on June 21, 1970. In 1976, Amtrak acquired Baltimore Penn Station as part of the transfer of Penn Central's railroad properties to Amtrak.

As part of the Northeast Corridor Improvement Project, the station was restored to its 1911 appearance in 1984. Baltimore Light RailLink service began in 1997.

=== 21st century ===
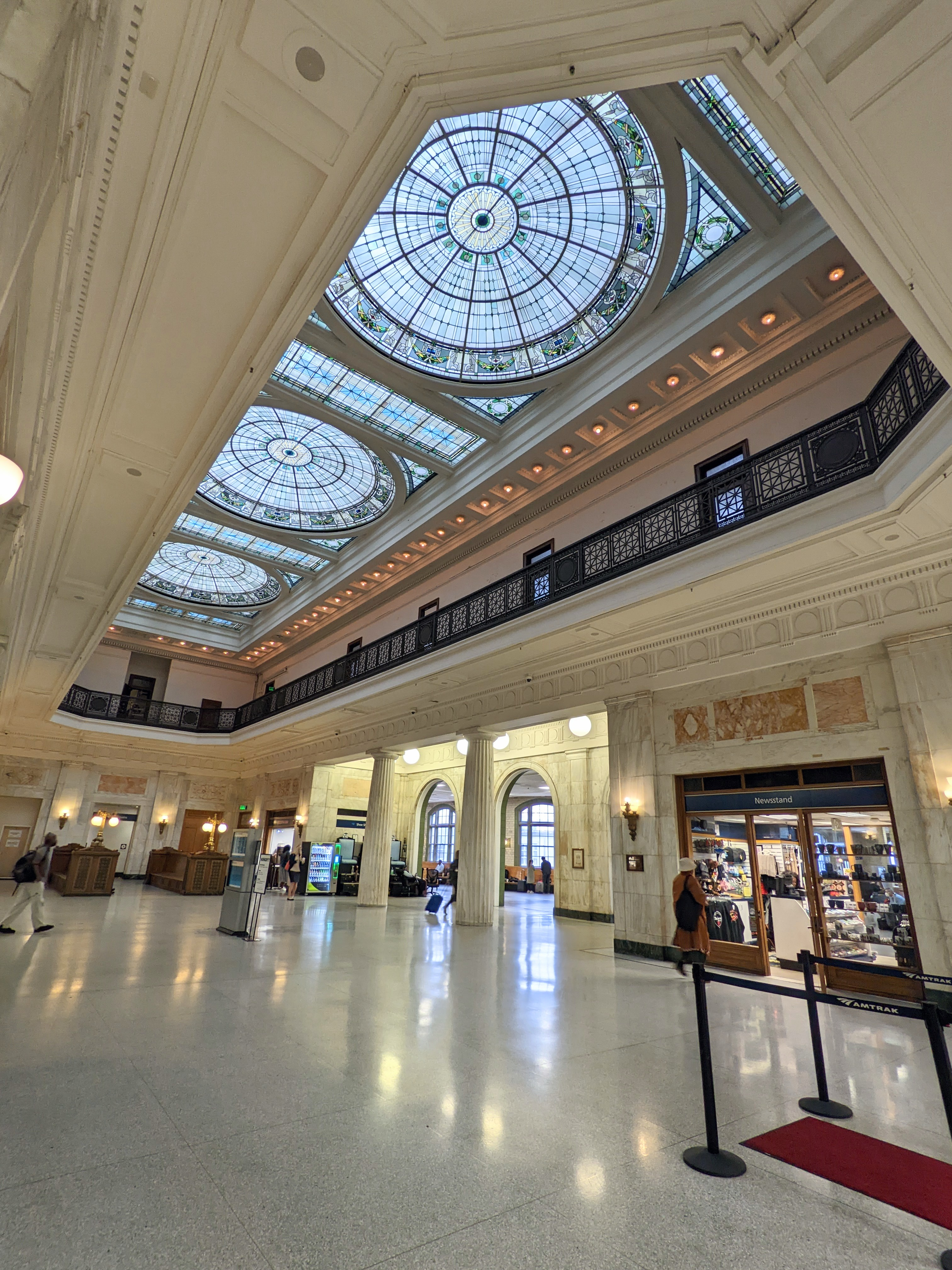
Penn Station's train hall in 2022

In 2004, Baltimore, through its public arts program, commissioned sculptor Jonathan Borofsky to create a sculpture as the centerpiece of a re-designed plaza in front of Penn Station. His work, a 51-foot (15.5 m)-tall aluminum statue, named Male/Female, has generated considerable controversy ever since, with The Baltimore Sun reporting what it called a "maelstrom of criticism". Its defenders cite the contemporary imagery and artistic expression as complementing an urban landscape, while opponents criticize what they decry as a clash with the station's Beaux-Arts architecture and detracting from its classic lines. The Baltimore Sun editorially characterized it as "oversized, underdressed, and woefully out of place".

The Camden Yards–Penn Station light rail service was suspended in September 2019 and replaced by a bus bridge due to a lack of available operators. Service later resumed, but was again suspended in 2022 due to Amtrak construction at Penn Station. Light rail service to Penn Station resumed in June 2025.

=== Redevelopment plans ===
Several proposals have been made to convert the upper floors of the station into a hotel. Proposals from 2001 and 2006 were announced but never completed. In 2009, Amtrak reached an agreement with a developer for a 77-room hotel to be called The Inn at Penn Station. This project stalled along with many other hotel proposals in Baltimore.

In December 2017, Amtrak awarded a contract to Penn Station Partners for improvements to the station and redevelopment of nearby property owned by the passenger railroad. The partnership is composed of Beatty Development Group and Cross Street Partners. In April 2019, it was announced that development would encompass a transit-oriented hub of apartments, shops, offices, a hotel, and redevelopment of nearby property owned by the passenger railroad. Amtrak describes the plan as creating a premier regional transportation hub to accommodate passenger growth as the next generation of high-speed Acela Express trains started running along the Northeast Corridor in 2021.

A spokesman for Penn Station Partners stated at a presentation of its tentative plans to the public on August 13, 2019, that they will seek city and state funding to help pay the total $400–600 million project cost. Included would be a new concourse and other station enhancements to accommodate the expected increase in passenger volume. Amtrak, for its part, has earmarked $90 million in federal funding for related improvements to the station and its tracks.

Amtrak and the Penn Station Partners development team headed by Beatty Development Group and Cross Street Partners unveiled plans to construct a three-level train terminal just north of the existing station on October 15, 2020. The new structure, which is meant to supplement the current building by accommodating all passenger-oriented functions with the expectation of increased traffic from the potential installation of a high-speed rail line, will be bordered by Charles Street to the west, Lanvale Street to the north, St. Paul Street to the east and the facility's railroad tracks to the south. The existing Penn Station's restoration began in 2021, with its upper levels converted into office space and restaurants and shops occupying the ground level.

In a June 8, 2021 editorial, The Baltimore Sun reported that the controversial Male/Female statue was not shown in the development team's conceptual drawings for the station plaza. The developers said no decision had been reached about its future, and the newspaper called for public input on the issue.
