= Perryville station =

Railway station in Perryville, Maryland, US

Perryville
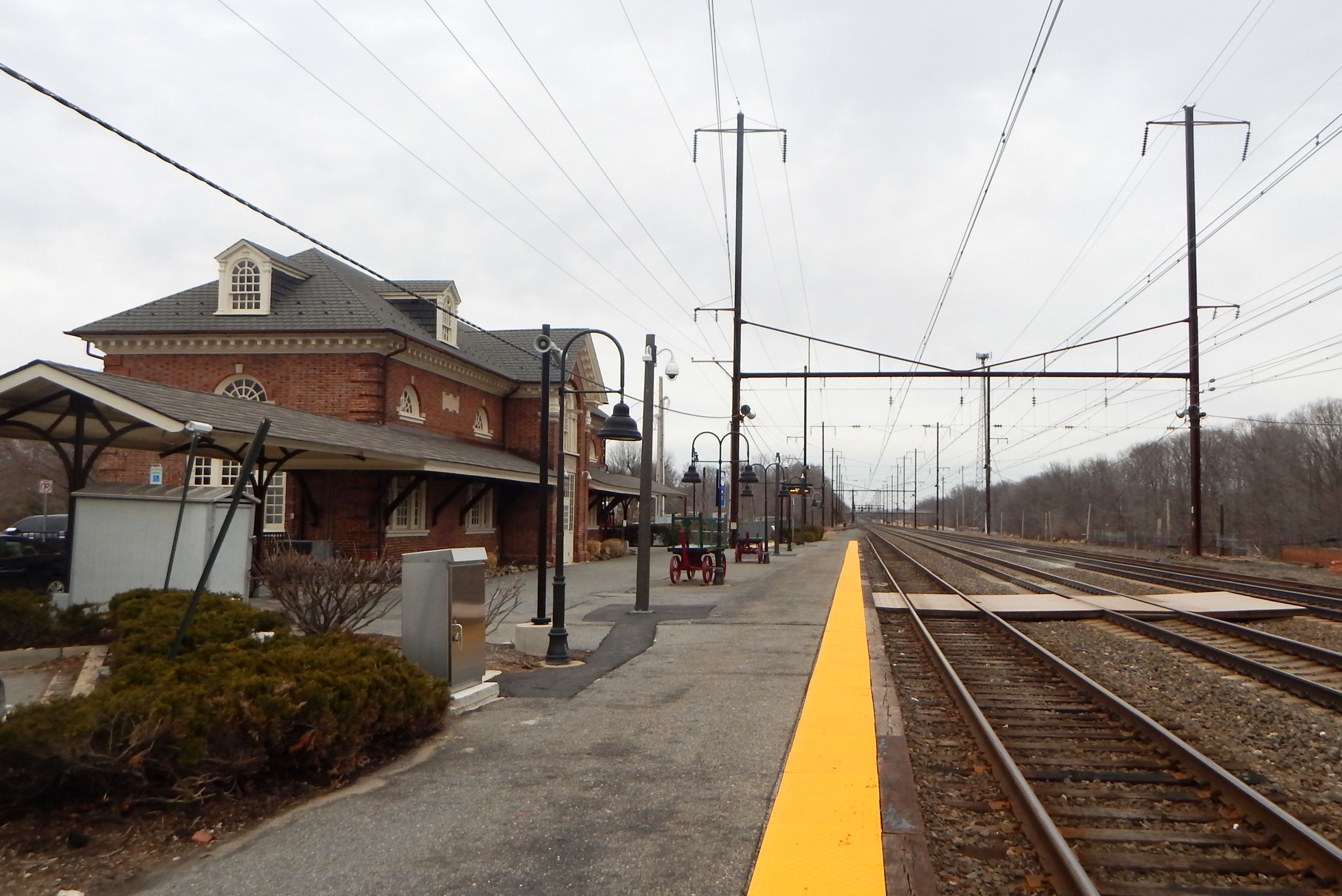
- Perryville station in March 2015

General information
- Location: 650 Broad Street; Perryville, Maryland
- Coordinates: 39°33′29.4″N 76°04′25.8″W
- Owner: Amtrak
- Line: Amtrak Northeast Corridor
- Platforms: 1 side platform
- Tracks: 4
- Connections: Cecil Transit: 2

Construction
- Parking: 135 spaces
- Accessible: Yes

History
- Opened: 1905 (PW&B)
- Rebuilt: 1992
- Electrified: January 28, 1935 (ceremonial); February 10, 1935 (regular service)

Passengers
- 2018: 128 daily ▼26.4% (MARC)

Services
Preceding station	MARC	Following station
Aberdeen toward Union Station	Penn Line	Terminus
Former services
Preceding station	Amtrak	Following station
Aberdeen toward Washington, D.C.	Chesapeake 1978–1983	Elkton toward Philadelphia–Suburban
Preceding station	Pennsylvania Railroad	Following station
Havre-de-Grace toward Washington, D.C.	Philadelphia, Wilmington and Baltimore Railroad	Principio toward Philadelphia
Proposed services
Preceding station	MARC	Following station
Aberdeen toward Union Station	Penn Line	Elkton toward Newark
Location

Perryville station is a passenger rail station on the Northeast Corridor in Perryville, Maryland. It is the northern terminus of the MARC Penn Line. The station has a single side platform serving the northern track of the four-track Northeast Corridor. The station building houses the Perryville Railroad Museum, which includes a model train layout and exhibits about the history of railroads in Perryville.

In 2023, the Maryland Transit Administration signed an agreement with Delaware Transit Corporation to extend MARC service from Perryville to Newark, Delaware, where it would connect with SEPTA Regional Rail.

== History ==
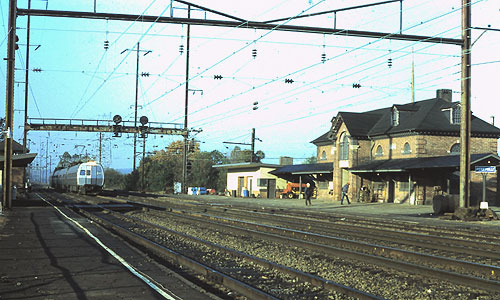
A Metroliner passes through Perryville station in 1979

The Perryville station was originally built by the Philadelphia, Wilmington and Baltimore Railroad in 1905 and adopted by the Pennsylvania Railroad, and is located within a wye for the PW&B's Port Deposit Branch. When Amtrak took over passenger service in 1971, the station was closed. It was a stop for the Chesapeake, which ran from 1978 to 1983. MARC Penn Line service was extended to Perryville on May 1, 1991, with intermediate stops at Aberdeen, Edgewood, and Martin State Airport. The station was restored that year at a cost near $1 million.

By September 2001, a single southbound Amtrak Northeast Regional train stopped at Perryville to supplement regular MARC service. The stop at Perryville was for MARC passengers only and was not listed in Amtrak timetables. Amtrak service at Perryville was suspended in March 2020 when Amtrak reduced service due to the COVID-19 pandemic.
