= Wilmington station (Delaware) =

Passenger rail station in Wilmington, Delaware

Wilmington, DE
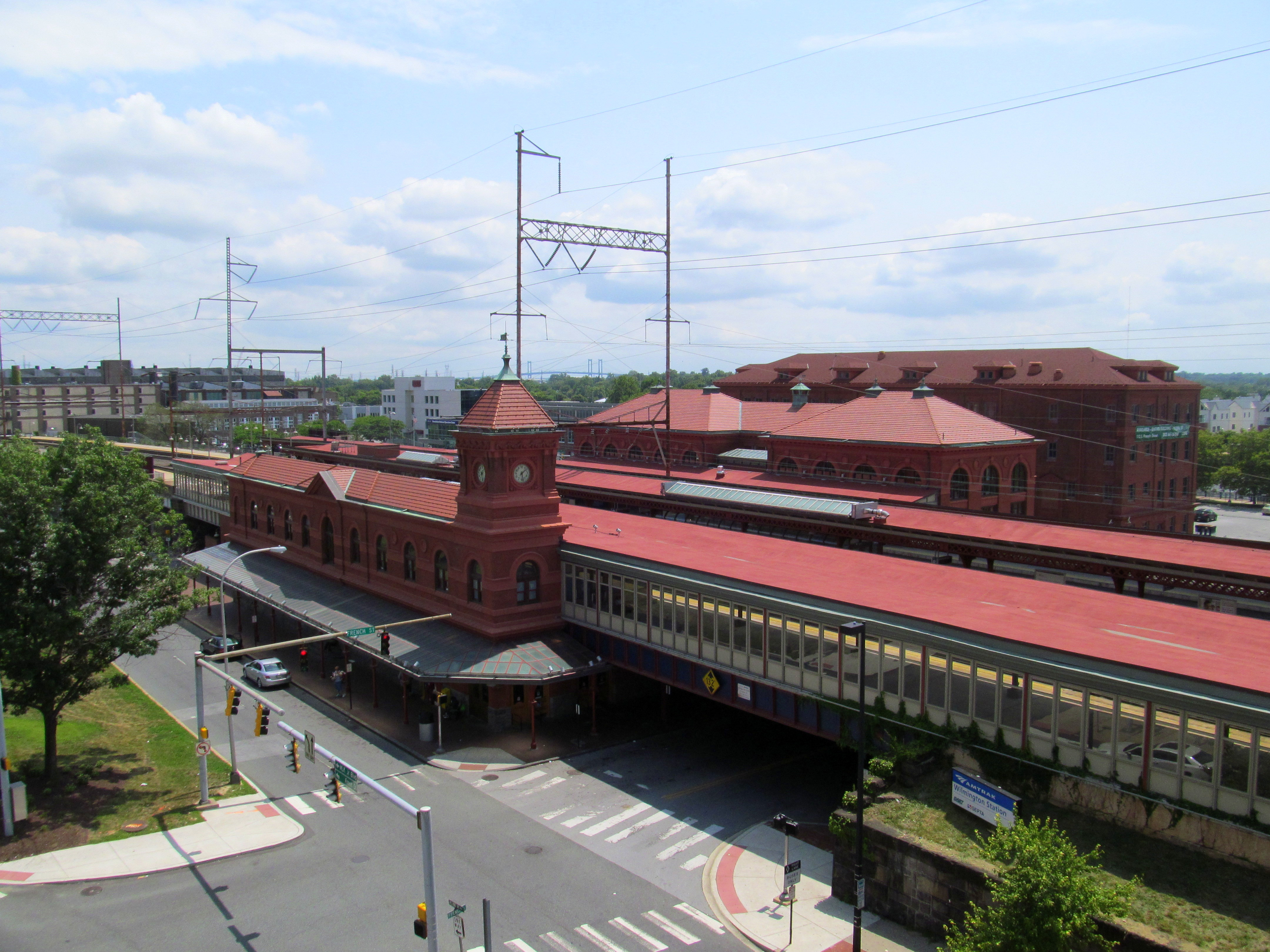
- Wilmington station in July 2014

General information
- Other names: Joseph R. Biden, Jr., Railroad Station
- Location: 100 South French Street; Wilmington, Delaware; United States
- Coordinates: 39°44′12″N 75°33′04″W
- Owner: Amtrak
- Line: Amtrak Northeast Corridor
- Platforms: 2 side platforms, 1 island platform
- Tracks: 3
- Connections: Amtrak Thruway; DART First State: 2, 5, 6, 10, 11, 13, 14, 18, 20, 33, 35, 40, 301, 305; Greyhound Lines

Construction
- Parking: Paid parking nearby
- Cycle facilities: 20 rack spaces
- Accessible: Yes

Other information
- Station code: Amtrak: WIL; SEPTA: 90203
- IATA code: ZWI
- Fare zone: 4 (SEPTA)

History
- Opened: 1908
- Rebuilt: 2011
- Electrified: 1928 (toward Philadelphia); 1935 (toward Washington D.C)
- Former names: French Street; Wilmington Pennsylvania Station

Passengers
- FY 2025: 814,517 (Amtrak)
- 2017: 878 boardings, 632 alightings (weekday average) (SEPTA)
- Rank: 19 of 146 (SEPTA)

Services
Preceding station	Amtrak	Following station
Baltimore toward Washington, D.C.	Acela	Philadelphia toward Boston South
Baltimore toward Washington, D.C.	Vermonter	Philadelphia toward St. Albans
Baltimore toward Chicago	Cardinal	Philadelphia toward New York
Baltimore toward Charlotte	Carolinian	Philadelphia toward New York
Baltimore toward New Orleans	Crescent	Philadelphia toward New York
Baltimore toward Savannah	Palmetto	Philadelphia toward New York
Baltimore toward Miami	Silver Meteor	Philadelphia toward New York
Newark, Delaware toward Norfolk, Newport News or Roanoke	Northeast Regional	Philadelphia toward Boston South or Springfield
Preceding station	SEPTA	Following station
Churchmans Crossing toward Newark	Wilmington/Newark Line	Claymont toward Temple University
Terminus	Wilmington/Newark Line (weekends and major holidays)	Claymont toward Temple University
Former services
Preceding station	Pennsylvania Railroad	Following station
Newport toward Washington, D.C.	Philadelphia, Wilmington and Baltimore Railroad	Edge Moor toward Philadelphia
Terminus	Wilmington Line	Edge Moor toward Suburban Station
New Castle toward Cape Charles	Delmarva Division	Terminus
Preceding station	Amtrak	Following station
Newark, Delaware toward Washington, D.C.	Chesapeake	Chester toward Philadelphia–Suburban
Baltimore toward Washington, D.C.	Federal	Philadelphia toward Boston South
Aberdeen toward Tri-State	Hilltopper	Philadelphia toward Boston South
Baltimore toward Washington, D.C.	Metroliner	Philadelphia toward New York
Baltimore toward Washington, D.C.	Montrealer	Philadelphia toward Montreal
Baltimore toward Miami	Silver Star	Philadelphia toward New York
- Wilmington Station
- U.S. National Register of Historic Places
- Area: 2 buildings and 1 structure on 3.3 acres (1.3 ha)
- Architect: Furness, Evans & Co.
- Architectural style: Romanesque Revival
- NRHP reference No.: 76000581
- Added to NRHP: November 21, 1976
Location

Wilmington station, also known as the Joseph R. Biden, Jr., Railroad Station, is a passenger rail station in Wilmington, Delaware. It serves nine Amtrak train routes and is part of the Northeast Corridor. It also serves SEPTA Regional Rail commuter trains on the Wilmington/Newark Line as well as DART First State local buses and Greyhound Lines intercity buses.

Built in 1907 as Pennsylvania Station, the station was renamed in 2011 for then-Vice President (now former President) Joe Biden, an advocate for passenger rail who routinely took the train from Wilmington to Washington, D.C. during his time as a Senator from 1973 to 2009. In 1987, Biden formally announced his ultimately unsuccessful bid for the 1988 Democratic presidential nomination at this station. Located on Front Street between French and Walnut Streets in downtown Wilmington, the station has one inside level with stores, a cafe/newsstand, Amtrak and SEPTA ticket offices, a car rental office, and restrooms. Passengers board their trains on the second-story train platforms.

== History ==
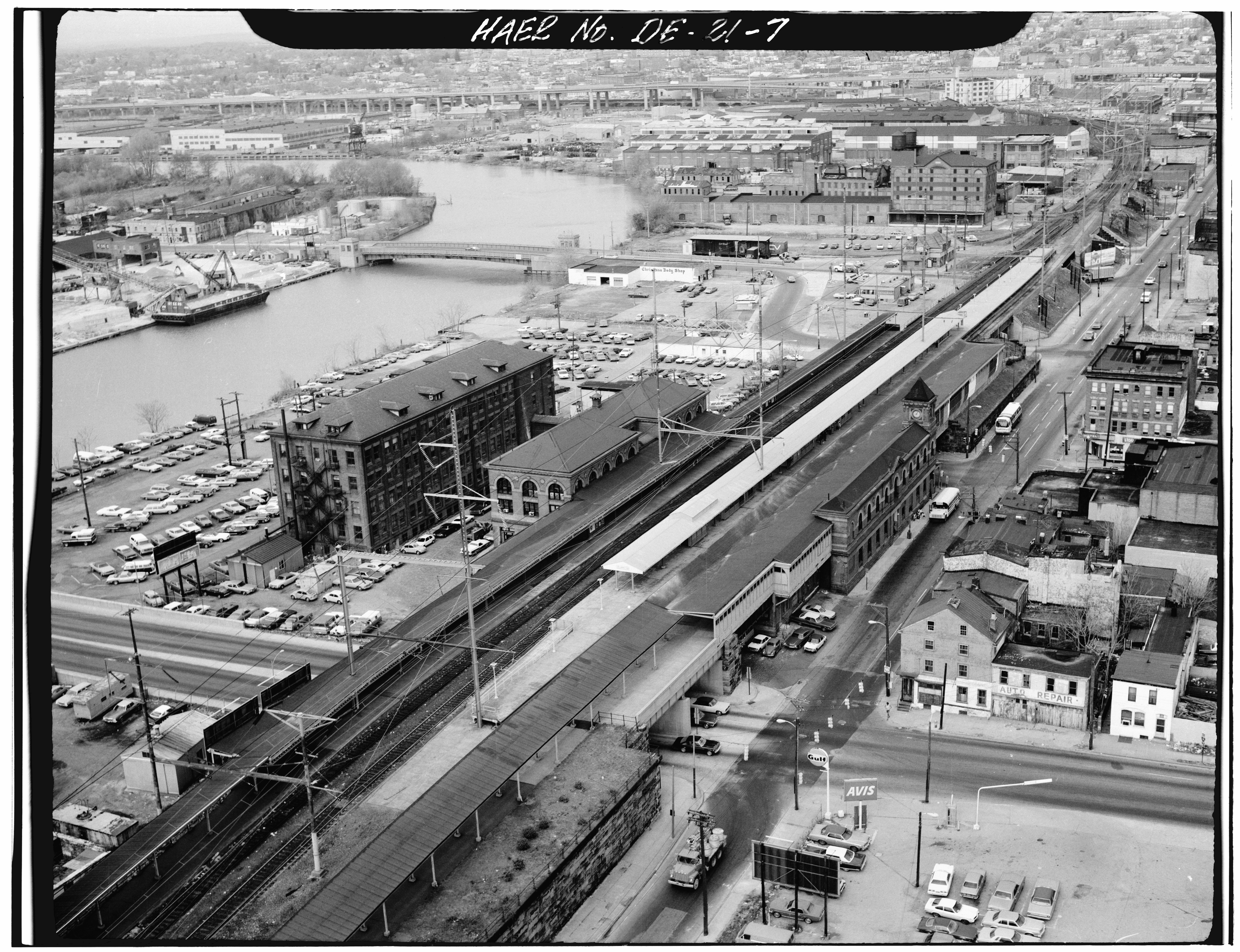
An aerial view of the station in 1977

The station replaced an earlier station erected by the Philadelphia, Wilmington and Baltimore Railroad. It was built in 1907 for $300,000 (equal to $10,366,071 today) by the PW&B successor, the Pennsylvania Railroad. It was designed by renowned architect Frank Furness, who also designed the adjacent Pennsylvania Railroad Building (which housed the offices for the Delaware Division of the Pennsylvania Railroad) and the nearby Baltimore and Ohio Railroad's Water Street Station. The Pennsylvania Railroad Building has since been renovated; as of 2014, it holds the offices of ING Direct United States. The new station was part of a grade separation project that also included construction of the Wilmington Rail Viaduct.

Furness had the trains move right through the second floor of the station, with room for a ticketing and retail concourse at ground level underneath the tracks. The north end of the station has a four-faced rectangular clock tower that rises an extra story above the main roof. It is decorated with stone and terra cotta work that is repeated in plainer form throughout the station.

Wilmington Station has been listed on the National Register of Historic Places since 1976. A renovation project was conducted in 1984. The National Register added the adjacent railroad viaduct in 1999. SEPTA has been running to Wilmington since 1989.

In 2009, the station began a two-year restoration; about two-thirds of the $37.7 million in funding came from United States government stimulus funds. During construction, customer operations, including platform access, were moved to a temporary station next door. The station reopened on December 6, 2010, and final work was completed in March 2011.

On March 19, 2011, the station's name was changed from Wilmington Station to Joseph R. Biden, Jr., Railroad Station. The ceremony honored U.S. Vice President (and later President) Joe Biden, who took over 7,000 round trips from the station to Washington, D.C. during his U.S. Senate career and was noted as an advocate for Amtrak and passenger rail more generally. On January 20, 2017, within an hour after completing his tenure as vice president, Biden boarded an Amtrak Acela train in Washington, D.C. bound for his namesake station.

The adjacent Wilmington Transit Center for DART First State bus service opened in May 2020. A $11.6 million renovation of the station, which included two new escalators, was completed in October 2023.

== Services ==
=== Rail ===
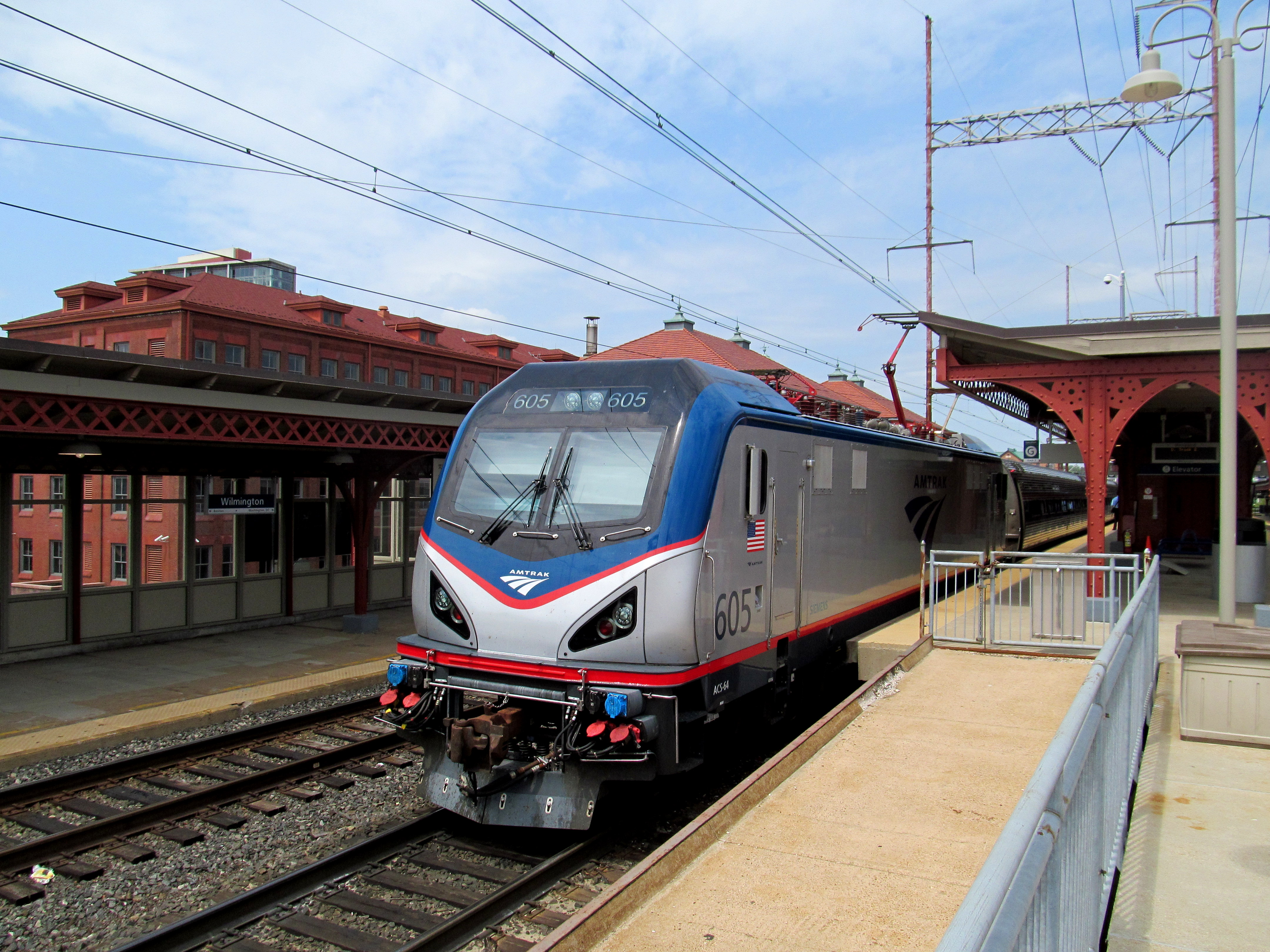
A northbound Amtrak Northeast Regional train at Wilmington station

The station is served by Amtrak Northeast Regional and Acela trains along the Northeast Corridor going south to Baltimore and Washington, D.C., and going north to Philadelphia, New York City, and Boston. It is also served by several long-distance trains including the Cardinal to Chicago, the Carolinian to Charlotte, the Crescent to New Orleans, the Palmetto to Savannah, the Silver Meteor to Miami, and the Vermonter to St. Albans, Vermont. Amtrak Thruway service is provided through the station to Dover, Delaware and Salisbury, Maryland via Greyhound Lines. It is also served by SEPTA Regional Rail's Wilmington/Newark Line with service to Center City Philadelphia and Newark, Delaware.

=== Bus ===
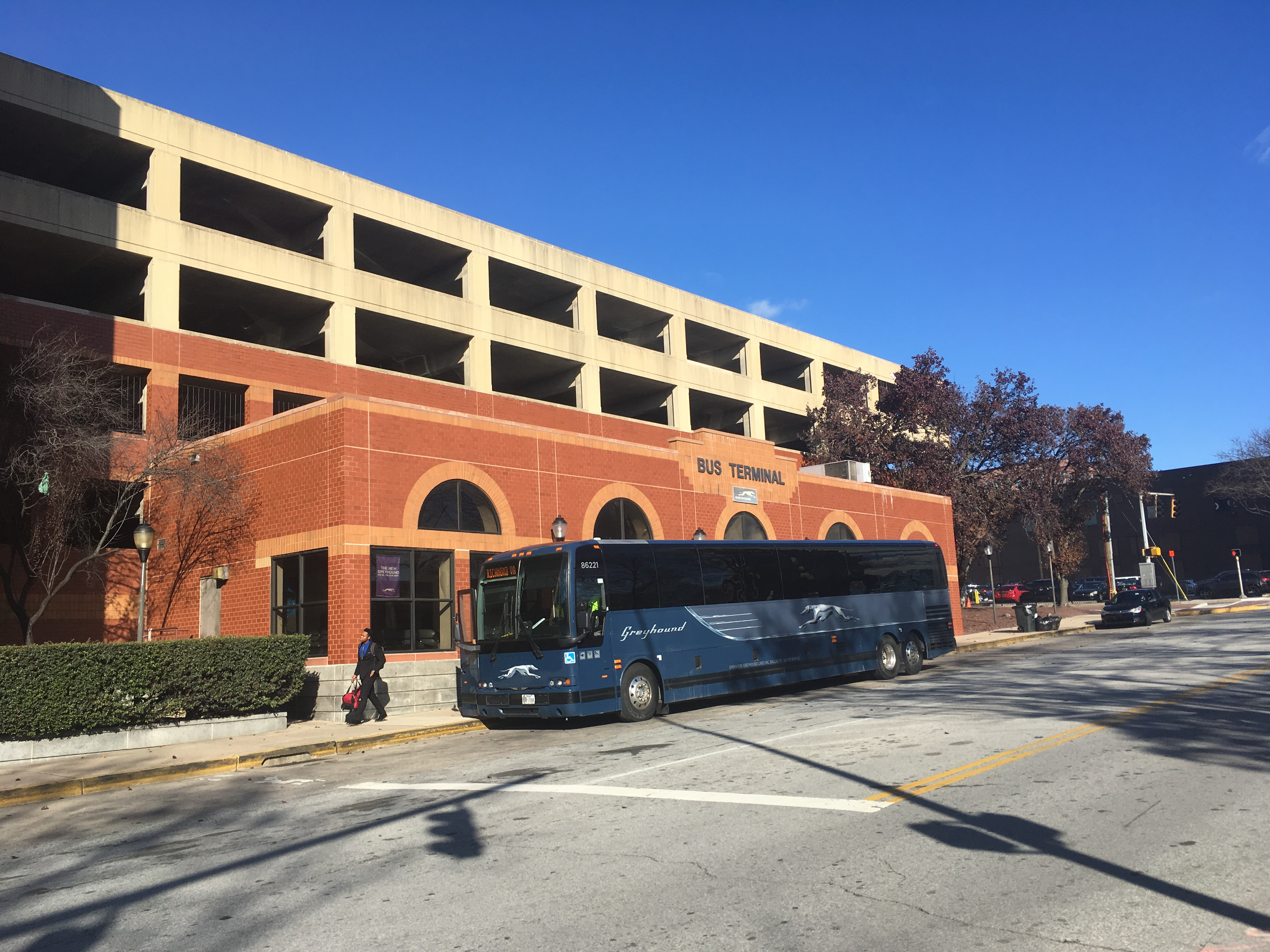
Wilmington Bus Station in 2018

Greyhound Lines intercity buses stop at the Wilmington Bus Station adjacent to the Wilmington station at 101 North French Street. The bus terminal is attached to the station's parking garage. Greyhound Lines provides direct, one-seat ride service from the bus terminal to various cities including Baltimore, New York City, Norfolk, Philadelphia, Richmond, and Washington, D.C.

DART First State bus routes serving Wilmington station include 2, 5, 6, 10, 11, 13, 14, 18, 20, 28, 33, 35, 40, 301, and 305 (seasonally). Most buses stop at the Wilmington Transit Center adjacent to the station. The Wilmington Transit Center was built as a DART First State bus hub adjacent to Wilmington station. A groundbreaking ceremony for the transit center was held on November 19, 2018, with Governor John Carney, U.S. Senator Tom Carper, Wilmington Mayor Mike Purzycki, DelDOT Secretary Jennifer Cohan, and DART First State CEO John Sisson in attendance. The Wilmington Transit Center serves most DART First State bus routes in Wilmington and includes a covered waiting area with seats, real-time bus displays, a ticket sales office, restrooms, vending machines, bicycle racks, and parking. Construction of the transit center cost $19 million and opened on May 17, 2020.

== See also ==
- National Register of Historic Places listings in Wilmington, Delaware
