= Annapolis Road Line =

P40
- Annapolis Road Line

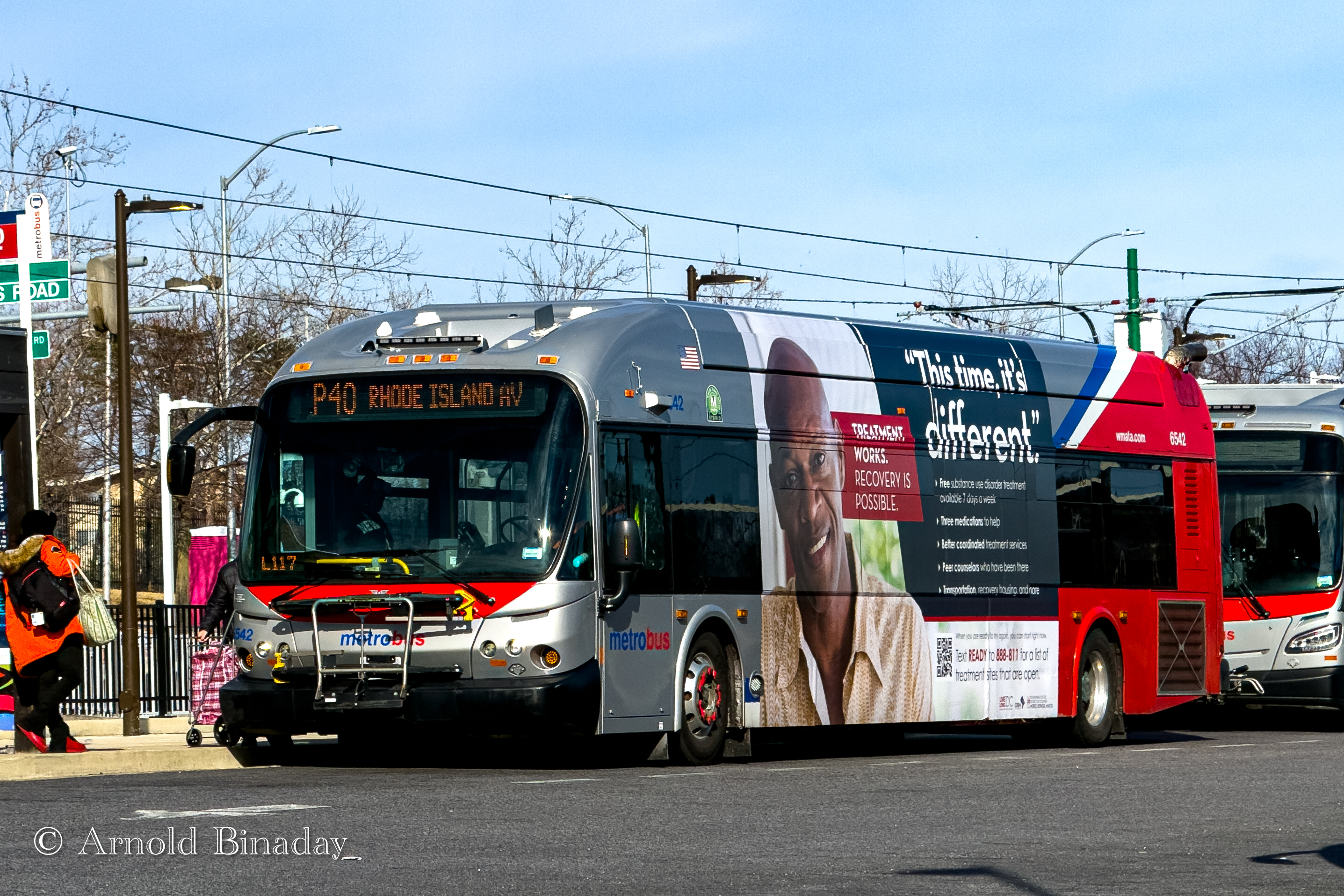
- Route P40 at New Carrollton station in January 2026

Overview
- System: Metrobus
- Operator: Washington Metropolitan Area Transit Authority
- Garage: Landover
- Livery: Local
- Status: In Service
- Began service: December 3, 1978
- Predecessors: T18

Route
- Locale: Prince George's County, Northeast
- Communities served: New Carrollton, West Lanham Hills, Landover Hills, Mattapony, Bladensburg, Colmar Manor, Cottage City, Brentwood, Mount Rainier, Brookland, Langdon, Woodridge, Brentwood
- Landmarks served: Peace Cross, Elizabeth Seton High School, Bladensburg High School, Capital Plaza
- Start: New Carrollton station
- Via: Annapolis Road, Bladensburg Road, Rhode Island Avenue NE
- End: Rhode Island Avenue station
- Length: 50 minutes

Service
- Level: Daily
- Frequency: 12 minutes (7AM - 9PM); 45-60 minutes (After 9PM)
- Journey time: 4:45 AM – 2:05 AM
- Ridership: 2,174,368 (FY 2025)
- Transfers: SmarTrip only
- Timetable: Annapolis Road Line

The Annapolis Road Line, designated Route P40, is a daily bus route operated by the Washington Metropolitan Area Transit Authority between New Carrollton station of the Orange and Silver Lines of the Washington Metro and Rhode Island Avenue station of the Red Line of the Washington Metro. The line operates every 12 minutes during the weekdays between 7AM and 9PM and 45–60 minutes after 9PM. P40 trips roughly take 50 minutes to complete.

== Background ==
Route P40 operates daily between New Carrollton station and Rhode Island Avenue station providing service along Annapolis Road and connecting passengers between Prince George's County and Northeast. Route P40 also runs a limited stop segment between Mount Rainier terminal and Rhode Island Avenue station serving only 7 stops in each direction. Local service is provided by Routes D32 and P10.

Route P40 operates out of Landover division.

=== P40 stops ===
Bus stop	Direction	Connections
Prince George's County, Maryland
New Carrollton station Bus Bay K	Westbound station, Eastbound terminal	Metrobus: P20, P21, P24, P30, P31, P35, P42, P60, P61; MTA Maryland Commuter Bus; TheBus: P22, P23, P2X, P44, P52, P5X, P71; Greyhound; Peter Pan Bus Lines; Washington Metro: MARC: Penn Line; Amtrak: Northeast Regional, Palmetto, Vermonter; MTA: Purple Line (Planned)
Harkins Road / Ellin Road	Bidirectional	Metrobus: P20, P21, P24, P30, P31, P35; TheBus: P22
Harkins Road / Sherwood Street	Bidirectional	Metrobus: P20, P21, P24, P30, P31, P35; TheBus: P22
Harkins Road / Annapolis Road	Westbound	Metrobus: P20, P21, P24, P30, P31, P35; TheBus: P22
Annapolis Road / Harkins Road	Eastbound	Metrobus: P20, P21, P24, P30, P31, P35; TheBus: P22
Annapolis Road / 77th Avenue	Bidirectional	TheBus: P22
Annapolis Road / 76th Avenue	Bidirectional	TheBus: P22
Annapolis Road / Gallatin Street	Bidirectional	TheBus: P22; MTA: Purple Line (at Glenridge station) (Planned)
Annapolis Road / Ardwick Ardmore Road	Bidirectional	TheBus: P22
Annapolis Road / Greenvale Parkway	Westbound	TheBus: P22
Annapolis Road / 72nd Avenue	Eastbound	TheBus: P22
Annapolis Road / 71st Avenue	Bidirectional	TheBus: P22
Annapolis Road / 69th Place	Bidirectional	TheBus: P22
Annapolis Road / 69th Avenue	Bidirectional	TheBus: P22
Annapolis Road / 68th Avenue	Bidirectional	TheBus: P22
Annapolis Road / Cooper Lane	Bidirectional	Metrobus: P41; TheBus: P22
Annapolis Road / 65th Avenue	Bidirectional	Metrobus: P41
Annapolis Road / 62nd Avenue	Bidirectional	Metrobus: P41
Annapolis Road / 57th Avenue	Westbound	
57th Avenue / Annapolis Road	Bidirectional	
57th Avenue / Bladensburg High School	Bidirectional	
57th Avenue / 58th Avenue	Bidirectional	
57th Avenue / Bladensburg High School	Bidirectional	
57th Avenue / Emerson Street	Bidirectional	
58th Avenue / #4213	Bidirectional	
58th Avenue / #4245-#4251	Bidirectional	
58th Avenue / Roger Heights Elementary School	Bidirectional	
Emerson Street / 57th Avenue	Bidirectional	
57th Avenue / Annapolis Road	Bidirectional	
Annapolis Road / 56th Avenue	Bidirectional	
Annapolis Road / Landover Road	Bidirectional	TheBus: P43
Annapolis Road / 54th Street	Westbound	TheBus: P43
Annapolis Road / Bladensburg Elementary School	Bidirectional	TheBus: P43
Annapolis Road / Edmonston Road	Bidirectional	Metrobus: P42; TheBus: P43
Annapolis Road / 48th Street	Bidirectional	Metrobus: P42; TheBus: P43
Annapolis Road / 46th Street	Bidirectional	Metrobus: P42; TheBus: P43
Bladensburg Road / 43rd Avenue	Bidirectional	Metrobus: P42; TheBus: P43
Bladensburg Road / 42nd Avenue	Eastbound	Metrobus: P42; TheBus: P43
Bladensburg Road / 41st Avenue	Westbound	Metrobus: P42; TheBus: P43
Bladensburg Road / 40th Place	Eastbound	Metrobus: P42; TheBus: P43
Bladensburg Road / 38th Avenue	Bidirectional	Metrobus: P42; TheBus: P43
38th Avenue / Parkwood Street	Bidirectional	TheBus: P43
38th Avenue / Perry Street	Bidirectional	TheBus: P43
Rhode Island Avenue / 37th Place	Westbound	Metrobus: C41, P10, P1X
Rhode Island Avenue / 37th Street	Eastbound	Metrobus: C41, P10, P1X
Rhode Island Avenue / 34th Street	Westbound	Metrobus: C41, P10, P1X
Rhode Island Avenue / Municipal Place	Eastbound	Metrobus: C41, P10, P1X
Northeast Washington, D.C.
Rhode Island Avenue NE / Eastern Avenue NE	Bidirectional	Metrobus: C41, P10, P1X, P42
Rhode Island Avenue NE / Newton Street NE	Bidirectional	Metrobus: P10, P1X
Rhode Island Avenue NE / South Dakota Avenue NE	Eastbound	Metrobus: D32, P10, P1X
Rhode Island Avenue NE / 24th Street NE	Westbound	Metrobus: D32, P10, P1X
Rhode Island Avenue NE / 18th Street NE	Bidirectional	Metrobus: C71, D32, P10, P1X
Rhode Island Avenue NE / Montana Avenue NE	Eastbound	Metrobus: C63, D32, P10, P1X
Rhode Island Avenue NE / Brentwood Road NE	Westbound	Metrobus: C63, D32, P10, P1X
Rhode Island Avenue NE / 12th Street NE	Bidirectional	Metrobus: D32, D36, D74, P10, P1X
Rhode Island Avenue station Bus Bay C	Eastbound station, Westbound terminal	Metrobus: D32, D36, D74, P10, P1X; Metropolitan Branch Trail; Washington Metro:

== History ==
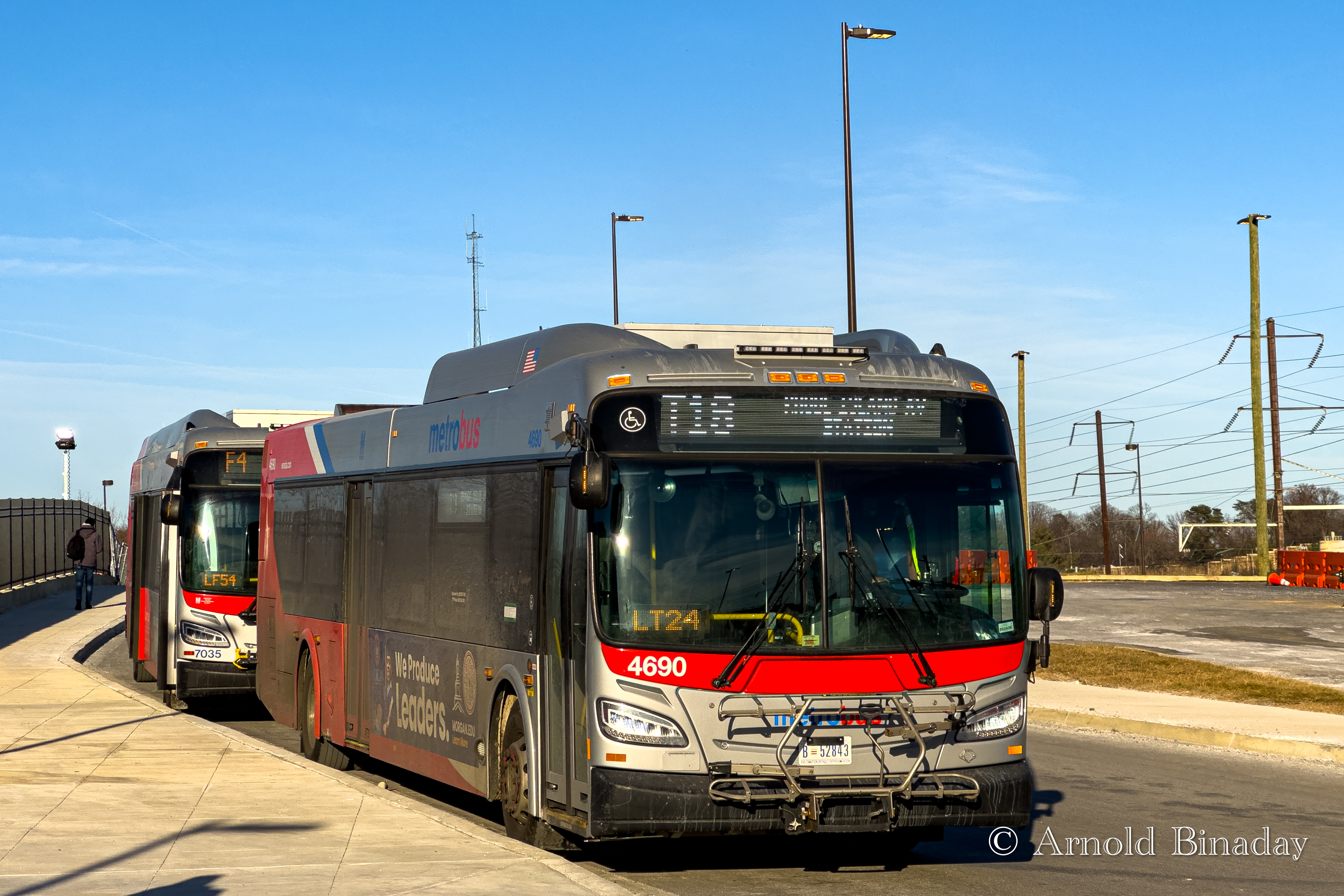
Former Route T18 at New Carrollton station in January 2025

Prior to WMATA's Better Bus Redesign network, Route P40 was originally known as Route T18. Route T18 was created as a brand new Metrobus Route by WMATA on December 3, 1978 to operate between New Carrollton station and Rhode Island Avenue–Brentwood station shortly after New Carrollton station opened on November 20, 1978.

Route T18 was designed to replace the segment of routes T14, T16, and T17 routing between Annapolis Road in New Carrollton and the Rhode Island Avenue Metro Station, via Capital Plaza Mall, since routes T14, T16, and T17 were truncated to terminate at New Carrollton.

Route T18 would operate along Ellin Road, Harkins Road, and Annapolis Road, then divert off Annapolis Road after passing the Baltimore–Washington Parkway and Capital Plaza, and make a loop along 57th Avenue, 58th Avenue, Emerson Street, and then 57th Avenue to serve Bladensburg High School, as well as the adjacent apartment complexes. Then the route returns onto Annapolis Road remaining straight on Annapolis Road and Bladensburg Road, then turn onto the intersection of 38th Avenue and 38th Street, another left turn at the intersection of Rhode Island Avenue and remain straight on Rhode Island Avenue before reaching the intersection of Washington Place NE and ultimately making a left turn onto that street to enter Rhode Island Avenue–Brentwood station. Route T18 would then turn back and operate on the same routing (except in the exact opposite direction), back towards New Carrollton station.

=== Limited Stop Segment ===
Beginning on December 14, 2014, route T18 began a newly limited stop segment along Rhode Island Avenue between Mount Rainier terminal and Rhode Island Avenue-Brentwood station along with route T14. The limited stop segment was to reduce bus bunching along Rhode Island Avenue and improve on time performance for route T14, and T18. Buses would only serve the following stops:

- Rhode Island Ave & 12th St NE
- Rhode Island Ave & Montana Ave NE (eastbound)/14th St NE (westbound)
- Rhode Island Ave & 18th St NE
- Rhode Island Ave & South Dakota Ave NE (eastbound)/24th St NE (westbound)
- Rhode Island Ave & Newton St NE
- Rhode Island Ave & Eastern Ave NE

Passengers wishing for local service will have to use routes 83 or 86. This resulted with route T18 running as a direct route, and route T14 runs primarily through neighborhoods.

=== Later changes ===
During the COVID-19 pandemic, the T18 operated on its Saturday supplemental schedule beginning on March 16, 2020. It however began operating on its Sunday service on March 18, 2020. Weekend service was also suspended beginning on March 21, 2020. Weekend service was restored on a limited basis on July 18, 2020. Full service resumed on August 23, 2020. Full service was restored on August 23, 2020.

On September 5, 2021, service was also increased to operate every 12 minutes daily between 7 a.m. to 9 p.m.

In 2024 during WMATA's FY2024 Budget crisis, WMATA proposed to eliminate all service after midnight daily on the T18. However on April 25, 2024, Metro’s Board of Directors approved a $4.8 billion capital and operating budget which avoided service cuts.

=== Better Bus Redesign ===
In 2022, WMATA launched its Better Bus Redesign project, which aimed to redesign the entire Metrobus Network and is the first full redesign of the agency's bus network in its history.

In April 2023, WMATA launched its Draft Visionary Network. As part of the drafts, WMATA proposed to rename the T18 to Route MD146, and kept the same routing of the current T18. During WMATA's Revised Draft Visionary Network, WMATA renamed the MD146 to Route P40 and kept its same routing. The change were then proposed during WMATA's 2025 Proposed Network.

On November 21, 2024, WMATA approved its Better Bus Redesign Network.

Beginning on June 29, 2025, Route T18 was renamed to the P40 and kept the same routing as the former T18 did.

== Incidents ==
On January 10, 2022, a man was stabbed on board a T18 bus along Rhode Island Avenue between 14th Street and Montana Avenue. The suspect ran away from the scene.
