= Landover Road Line =

Bus route in United States

P41
- Landover Road Line

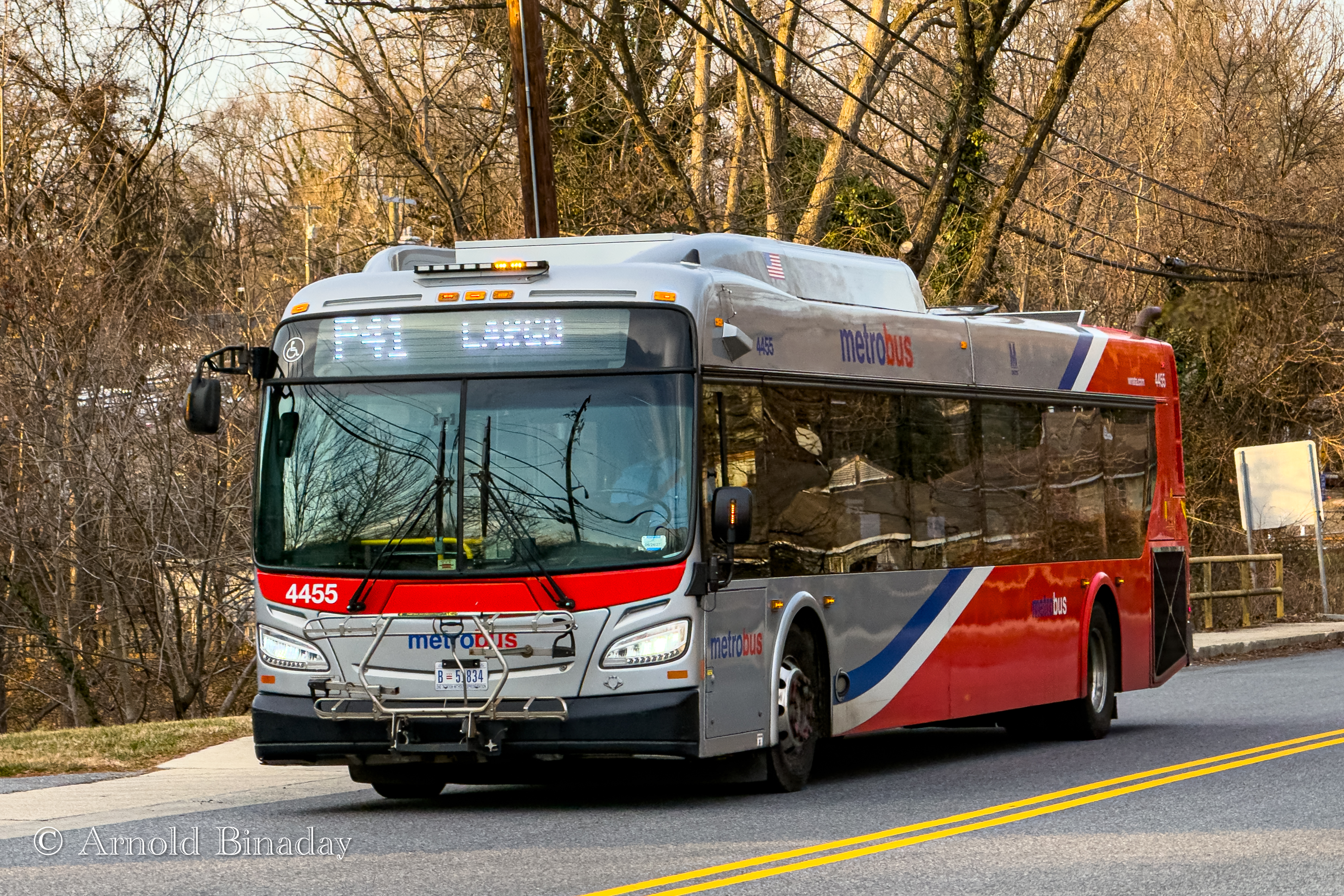
- Route P41 in Palmer Park in January 2026

Overview
- System: Metrobus
- Operator: Washington Metropolitan Area Transit Authority
- Garage: Landover
- Livery: Local
- Status: In Service
- Began service: June 25, 2023
- Predecessors: L12

Route
- Locale: Prince George's County
- Communities served: Landover Hills, Cheverly, Landover, Dodge Park, Palmer Park, Kentland, Glenarden, Largo
- Landmarks served: Capital Plaza, Landover station, Woodmore Towne Centre, Downtown Largo station
- Start: Capital Plaza
- Via: Annapolis Road, Baltimore–Washington Parkway, Landover Road, Ruby Lockhart Boulevard, Lottsford Road
- End: Downtown Largo station

Service
- Level: Daily
- Frequency: 20 minutes (7AM - 9PM); 30 minutes (After 9PM)
- Operates: 5:00 AM – 1:40 AM
- Ridership: 631,816 (FY 2025)
- Transfers: SmarTrip only
- Timetable: Landover Road Line

The Landover Road Line, designated Route P41 is a daily bus route operated by the Washington Metropolitan Area Transit Authority between Downtown Largo station of the Blue and Silver Lines of the Washington Metro and Capital Plaza. The line operates every 20 minutes between 7AM and 9PM, and 30 minutes after 9PM. Route P41 trips roughly take 48 minutes. The line was a portion of the A12 (now route P60), which was split into two separate routes beginning on June 25, 2023.

== Route ==
Route P41 operates daily between Capital Plaza and Downtown Largo station providing service among the Landover community. Route P41 operates out of Landover division.

=== P41 Stops ===
Bus stop	Direction	Connections
Prince George's County, Maryland
Downtown Largo Bus Bay A	Westbound station, Eastbound terminal	Metrobus: P63, P72, P73; TheBus: P44, P52, P56, P57, P5X, P64; Washington Metro:
Largo Drive West / #9301	Westbound	Metrobus: P63, P72, P73; TheBus: P52, P57
Harry S. Truman Drive / Largo Drive West	Eastbound	Metrobus: P63, P72, P73; TheBus: P52, P57
Lottsford Road / Largo Drive West	Eastbound	Metrobus: P63, P72, P73; TheBus: P57
Lottsford Road / Harry S. Truman Drive	Bidirectional	Metrobus: P63, P72, P73; TheBus: P52, P57
Lottsford Road / Grand Boulevard	Bidirectional	TheBus: P52
Lottsford Road / Zachery Street	Bidirectional	TheBus: P52
Lottsford Road / Medical Center Drive	Bidirectional	
Lottsford Road / McCormick Drive	Bidirectional	TheBus: P57
Lottsford Road / #9475	Westbound	
Lottsford Road / #9617	Eastbound	
Lottsford Road / Landover Road	Westbound	
Ruby Lockhart Boulevard / Cross Church Way	Bidirectional	TheBus: P57
Ruby Lockhart Boulevard / Ruby Turn	Bidirectional	TheBus: P57
Ruby Lockhart Boulevard / Grand Way Boulevard	Bidirectional	TheBus: P57
Ruby Lockhart Boulevard / Campus Way North	Bidirectional	TheBus: P57
Landover Road / Brightseat Road	Eastbound	
Landover Road / Barlowe Road	Eastbound	
Barlowe Road / Landover Road	Westbound	
Barlowe Road / Allendale Drive	Bidirectional	TheBus: P44
Barlowe Road / Palmer Park Road	Bidirectional	TheBus: P44
Matthew Henson Avenue / Barlowe Road	Eastbound	TheBus: P44
Greenleaf Road / Matthew Henson Avenue	Bidirectional	TheBus: P44
Greenleaf Road / Normandy Road	Bidirectional	Metrobus: P60; TheBus: P44
Greenleaf Road / Muncy Road	Westbound	Metrobus: P60; TheBus: P44
Landover Road / #7781	Eastbound	
Fire House Road / East Lombard Street	Bidirectional	TheBus: P44
Fire House Road / Hawthorne Street	Westbound	TheBus: P44
Hawthorne Street / Fire House Road	Eastbound	TheBus: P44
Hawthorne Street / Kent Village Drive	Bidirectional	TheBus: P44
Hawthorne Street / Kent Town Drive	Bidirectional	
Hawthorne Street / Pinebrook Avenue	Bidirectional	
Landover Road / Pinebrook Avenue	Bidirectional	TheBus: P44
Old Landover Road / Landover Road	Bidirectional	TheBus: P44
Landover Bus Bays C and D	Bidirectional	TheBus: P44; Washington Metro:
Old Landover Road / Landover Road	Bidirectional	TheBus: P44
Landover Road / Kilmer Street	Bidirectional	TheBus: P22
Landover Road / Old Landover Road	Westbound	TheBus: P22
Landover Road / 63rd Place	Eastbound	TheBus: P22
Landover Road / Neighbor Lane	Westbound	TheBus: P22
Landover Road / 62nd Place	Eastbound	TheBus: P22
Landover Road / Hospital Drive	Eastbound	TheBus: P22, P43
Hospital Drive / Landover Road	Westbound	TheBus: P22, P43
Annapolis Road / 62nd Avenue	Bidirectional	Metrobus: P40
Annapolis Road / 65th Avenue	Bidirectional	Metrobus: P40
Cooper Lane / Annapolis Road Capital Plaza	Westbound terminal, Eastbound station	Metrobus: P40; TheBus: P22

== History ==
The Landover Road Line was introduced in 2023 as route L12 during the simplification of the A12 line. The first proposal for a new Route L12 happened in 2012 when WMATA proposed to split the A12 into two routes with the A12 running between Addison Road station and New Carrollton station via Brightseat Road and Ardwick Industrial Park and discontinuing service to Capital Plaza and Landover station primarily running along Martin Luther King Jr. Highway. A new Route L12 will operate the A12 routing between Capital Plaza and Largo Town Center (now Downtown Largo) station via Landover station and Woodmore Town Center, primarily running on Landover Road via Palmer Park and Hawthorne Street, running along the old A12 routing. Stops between Martin Luther King Jr. Highway and Brightseat Road will be replaced by a rerouted route F14 which will discontinue service along a portion of Brightseat Road being replaced by Route A12.

The reason for the changes was that WMATA wanted to have one route running primarily along Martin Luther King Jr. Highway (A12) and another route running primarily on Landover Road (L12). However, public feedback was opposed to the route change, which led WMATA to shelve the plans.

Later, during WMATA's 2024 Fiscal Year Budget in March 2023, WMATA brought back the A12 and L12 proposal from 2014, which was almost identical to the original proposal. The main difference from the 2014 proposal was that route F14 would not be rerouted along Landover Road and instead remain on Brightest Road. Subsequently, the FY2024 budget was approved in April 2023, which included a new Route L12.

In June 2023, WMATA announced that the new L12 would begin service on June 25, 2023. The line would be named under the Landover Road Line and will operate every 20 minutes between Downtown Largo station and Capital Plaza via Lottsford Road, Woodmore Towne Centre, Landover Road, Greenleaf Road, Matthew Henson Avenue, Barlowe Road, Fire House Road, Hawthorne Street, Pinebrook Avenue, Landover Station, Hospital Drive, and Annapolis Road, replacing the A12 which was rerouted to serve New Carrollton station beginning along the intersection of Glenarden Parkway & Martin Luther King Jr. Highway.

In 2024 during WMATA's FY2024 Budget crisis, WMATA proposed to reduce the frequency of buses from every 20 minutes to 30 minutes during the off-peak hour, and eliminate all service past midnight daily on the L12. However on April 25, 2024, Metro’s Board of Directors approved a $4.8 billion capital and operating budget which avoided service cuts.

=== Better Bus Redesign ===
In 2022, WMATA launched its Better Bus Redesign project, which aimed to redesign the entire Metrobus Network and is the first full redesign of the agency's bus network in its history.

In April 2023, WMATA launched its Draft Visionary Network. Despite the L12 not being implemented yet, WMATA still included L12 proposals under the A12 in the drafts.

In the proposal, WMATA was to split the A12 into two separate routes. The portion between Addison Road station and the intersection of Martin Luther King Jr. Highway & Greenleaf Road remained the same, but the A12 remained straight on Martin Luther King Jr. Highway and would operate to New Carrollton station via Ardwick Ardmore Road, Pennsy Road, Corporate Drive, and Garden City Drive. The line was also extended from Addison Road station to Suitland station via the P12 routing along Addison Road, Walker Mill Road, County Road, and Silver Hill Road. The line was named Route MD147.

The A12 portion along Landover Road was modified into different routes. The portion between Prince George's Hospital and the intersection of Landover Road & Brightseat Road was changed to operate between Prince George's Hospital and Downtown Largo station via Hospital Drive, Landover Road, Pennsy Drive, Landover station, Pinebrook Avenue, Hawthrone Avenue, Fire House Road, Landover Road, Martin Luther King Jr. Highway, Greenleaf Road, Barlowe Road, Landover Road, St. Josephs Drive, Ruby Lockhart Boulevard, Woodmore Town Center, Lottsford Road, Largo Drive West, and Harry S Truman Drive. The line was named Route MD256. This route would later become the L12 in June 2023, with the route also serving Capital Plaza.

The A12 portion between Landover station and Capital Plaza via Pennsy Drive, Landover Road, Hospital Drive, Prince George's Hospital, the Baltimore–Washington Parkway, and Annapolis Road was extended to operate to College Park–University of Maryland station via Annapolis Road, Veterans Parkway, Riverdale Road, Auburn Avenue, Good Luck Road, and Paint Branch Parkway. The line was named Route MD255.

Service along the Glenarden loop via Brightseat Road, Martin Luther King Jr. Highway, and Ardwick Ardmore Road was taken over by the proposed Route MD257, MD357, and MD363.

Before WMATA's Revised Draft Visionary Network, WMATA implemented the L12 between Capital Plaza and Downtown Largo station via Landover Road. This change was essentially the proposed MD256 routing with the extension to Capital Plaza. As a result, the proposed MD255 was dropped from the proposals, and the MD256 was renamed to Route P41, with service operating along the current Route MD256 and L12 routing, but service to Prince George's Hospital was not included in the proposal. All changes were then proposed during WMATA's 2025 Proposed Network.

On November 21, 2024, WMATA approved its Better Bus Redesign Network.

Beginning on June 29, 2025, Route L12 was renamed into the P41, keeping the same route with the exception that it no longer serves the former Prince George's Hospital Complex.
