= Beacon Heights–East Pines station =

Light rail station on the Purple Line in Maryland, US

Beacon Heights–East Pines
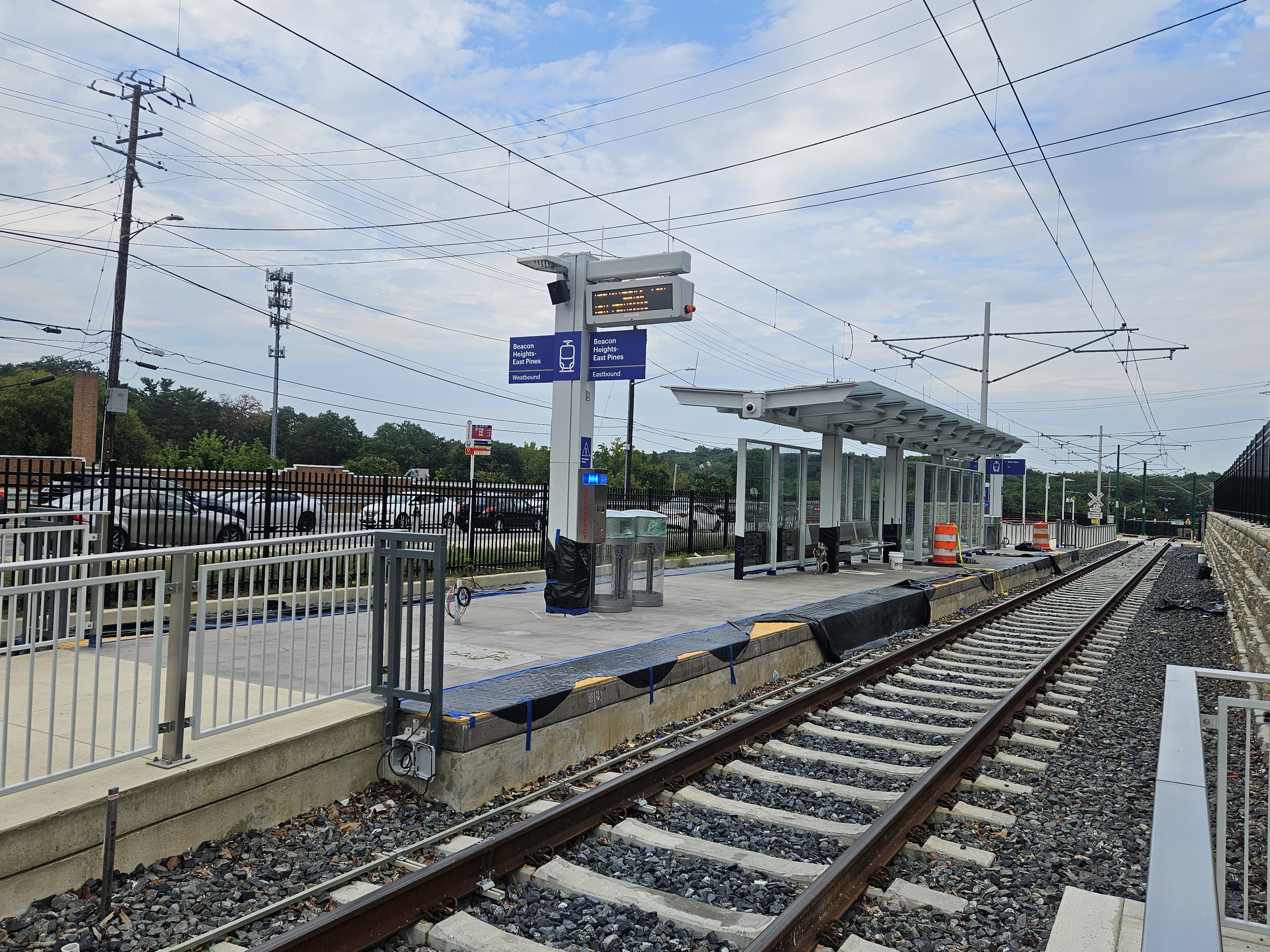
- The station under construction in August 2026

General information
- Location: Riverdale Road at 67th Avenue; Riverdale Park, Maryland
- Coordinates: 38.96202°N 76.90198°W
- Owner: Maryland Transit Administration
- Platforms: 1 island platforms
- Tracks: 2

Construction
- Parking: None
- Accessible: yes

History
- Opening: 2027 (scheduled)

Services
Preceding station	Maryland Transit Administration	Following station
Riverdale Park–Kenilworth toward Bethesda	Purple Line	Glenridge toward New Carrollton
Location

Beacon Heights–East Pines station is an under-construction light rail station in Riverdale Park, Maryland, that will be served by the Purple Line. It is located on the south side of Riverdale Road just east of 67th Avenue. The station has a single island platform; original plans called for side platforms. As of 2026, the Purple Line is planned to open in late 2027.
