= Riverdale Park station =

Riverdale Park station may refer to several stations in Riverdale Park, Maryland:

- Riverdale Park–Kenilworth station on the Purple Line
- Riverdale Park North–UMD station on the Purple Line
- Riverdale Park Town Center station on the MARC Camden Line
