= Lanham station =

Rail station in Maryland, United States

Lanham

General information
- Location: Lanham Station Road; Lanham, Maryland
- Coordinates: 38.9594°N 76.8630°W
- Line: Northeast Corridor
- Platforms: 2 side platforms

History
- Opened: 1873
- Closed: August 1982

Former services
Preceding station	Conrail	Following station
Landover toward Union Station	Baltimore-Washington Until August 1982	Seabrook toward Baltimore
Preceding station	Pennsylvania Railroad	Following station
Landover toward Washington, D.C.	Philadelphia, Wilmington and Baltimore Railroad	Seabrook toward Philadelphia
Location

Lanham station was a regional rail station on the Northeast Corridor, located just outside the Capital Beltway off Route 450 in Lanham, Maryland. It was served by the predecessor of today's MARC Penn Line, until August 1982.

== History ==
The Baltimore and Potomac Railroad opened its Washington Branch – soon after its main line – in 1872. The Lanham family deeded land in 1873 to the Baltimore and Potomac Railroad for a station. The B&P was formally acquired by the Pennsylvania Railroad (PRR) in 1902. The PRR began its first electric service between Wilmington and Washington, D.C., on February 10, 1935, with all trains converted to electric power by April 7.

The PRR folded into Penn Central in 1968. By this time, Lanham station was served only by a limited number of Baltimore-Washington commuter trips; intercity trains generally did not stop. The station then consisted of just a small wooden shelter and an asphalt platform on the northwest side of the tracks; the station building was long gone. The grade crossing at Lanham Station Road was likely closed in 1970 when Penn Central eliminated several such grade crossings in Prince George's County as part of the construction of Capital Beltway station for the Metroliner service.

Conrail took over the ex-PRR Baltimore-Washington service from Penn Central at its creation on April 1, 1976. Conrail added an asphalt platform on the southeast side of the tracks and three-sided iron shelters on both sides. However, the company was displeased with the station; it was in the middle of a sharp reverse curve with poor sightlines from trains, which resulted in several pedestrians being struck by high-speed trains.

In August 1982, Conrail commuter trains began stopping at Capital Beltway station, which had been used by intercity trains since 1970. This allowed Conrail to close the nearby Lanham and Landover stations. Amtrak and AMDOT (the ex-Conrail service, soon thereafter the Penn Line) abandoned Capital Beltway on October 30, 1983, in favor of nearby New Carrollton, which had been a Washington Metro stop since 1978. The grade crossing was closed to pedestrians at some point after the station was abandoned.
