= Landover Mall =

Defunct mall in Prince George's County, Maryland, U.S.

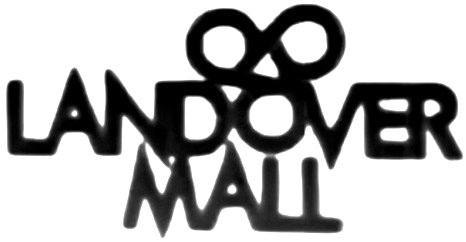
- Location: Landover, Maryland, United States
- Coordinates: 38°55′12″N 76°51′22″W
- Opened: May 11, 1972; 54 years ago
- Closed: May 19, 2002; 24 years ago (demolished 2006–early 2007)
- Developer: Lerner Enterprises
- Owner: Lerner Enterprises
- Num. of anchor tenants: 7
- Floor area: 1,300,000 square feet (120,000 m^{2})
- Floors: 2 (3 in Sears)

Landover Mall was a super-regional shopping mall located in Landover, Maryland, directly across from FedExField, off MD 202 and Interstates 95 and 495. The mall was built by Sonny Abramson and Ted Lerner of Lerner Enterprises, and opened May 11, 1972. Like its neighbor, Capital Plaza Mall, it was a major attraction through its opening years in Prince George's County. The mall featured many anchors and smaller tenants; however, upon the decline and closing of its major anchors, the mall itself entered a state of decline. Finally, in 2002, the mall's doors were closed and it ultimately was demolished in 2006. Sears remained open because it owned the land beneath the store. Sears later sold the land underneath its store to Lerner. In January 2014, Sears announced that it would close in March.

== Architecture ==
The mall had three fountains, one adjacent to Hecht's, Sears, and in center court. According to an article in The Washington Post published the day of the mall's grand opening, "The water display consists of seven 3" geysers that are programmed in continuously changing programs of water height (3' to 15') for the perimeter nozzles, and the center nozzle can push the water to a height of 30' if desirable. All splash will be contained in the perimeter six geysers." The main fountain in the mall contained three circular platforms, each representing a loop within the Capital Beltway interchange at Landover Road. During the holiday season the center ring fountains would be shut off and replaced with its annual secular Holiday displays, which featured gingerbread house, fairies, candy canes, snowmen, reindeer, sleigh ride, doves and a "Cupcake Boat Ride", but no Santa or explicit references to Christmas.

== History ==
=== Prime and downfall ===
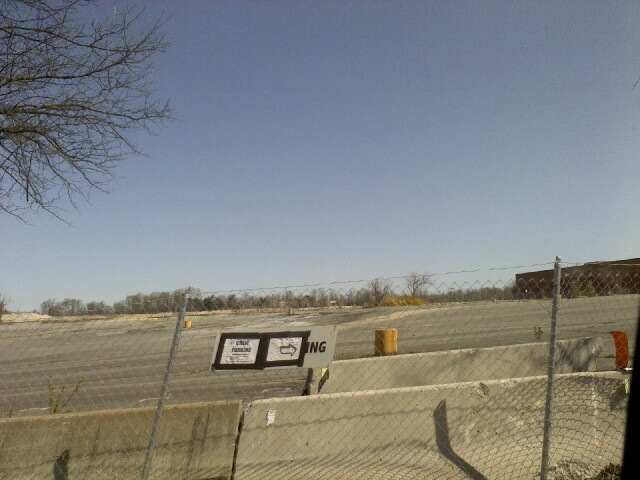
The grounds of the mall in 2010; Sears is visible in the far right.

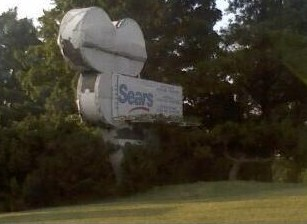
The main entrance sign in 2010.

In its prime, Landover Mall had three local department store anchors: Hecht's, Garfinckel's, Woodward & Lothrop (Woodies), and two national chains, Sears and F. W. Woolworth Company. It was the first mall in the region to have four anchors until Fair Oaks Mall opened in 1980. There was a six-screen theater in the basement, which had its own escalators, but it closed in 1991. In 1990, Garfinckel's filed for bankruptcy and went out of business. The former Garfinckel's anchor store was never replaced. Five years later, Woodies went out of business. JCPenney moved into the former Woodies location but found business unprofitable. The store was converted to a JCPenney outlet location in fall 1998 and was closed altogether in early 2001. In early 2002, Hecht's closed after opening a new store at Bowie Town Center in nearby Bowie, Maryland.

Washington DC Business Journal described Landover Mall in 1998 as " dogged since the mid-1980s by perceptions -- real and imagined -- of crime, drugs and violence in nearby communities, like Palmer Park and Seat Pleasant". The article also noted that competition from White Flint Mall and inability to replace vacated stores were factors in its poor reception.

=== Closure and demolition ===
After the closure of the main anchors to the mall, Ted Lerner decided to shut the mall down completely. The mall's doors were sealed shut with cinder blocks, although the Sears store remained open.

Demolition began in 2006, and was completed in early 2007. The entire mall was demolished, and its debris was recycled. Sears was the only store that remained open after the mall's closure because it owned the land on which the building stood. However, its former entrances to the mall were sealed shut on both its levels. Sears subsequently sold the land underneath the store to Lerner. In January 2014, Sears announced that it would not renew its lease with Lerner and closed its store in March 2014.

=== Demolition aftermath ===
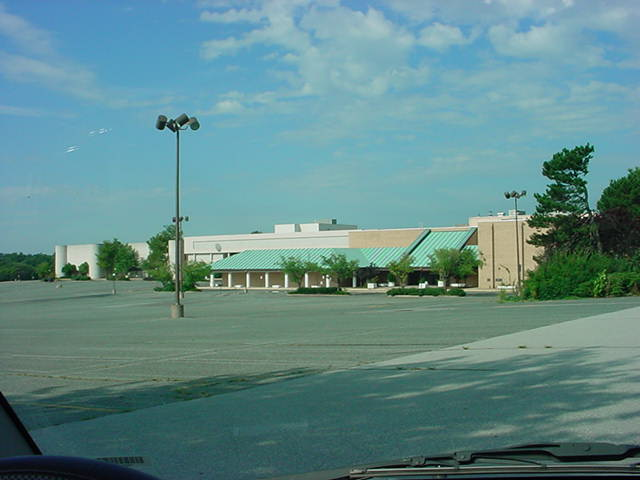
The mall in 2002

Sears was tentatively planning on relocating to the Ritchie Station Marketplace shopping center on Ritchie Road near Capitol Heights, Maryland. The area of the former mall and parking lot was fenced off and barricaded with cement blocks. The mall's main entrance sign was modified to eliminate its stylized cloverleaf logo shape with the remaining part of the sign and pedestal refurbished to read "Home to Future Development".

=== Today ===
In 2014, the FBI announced they were looking at possibly purchasing the land for a future FBI Headquarters after the acquisition of Sears land. Political complications in 2017 undid any progress which had been made and in October 2018, Lerner put the whole site up for sale. In 2022, GSA restarted the search, with the old Landover Mall site being one of three sites under consideration; however, in November 2023 the Greenbelt site was chosen instead.

On October 24, 2024 it was announced that Brightseat Associates would be building a datacenter complex tentatively called Brightseat Tech Park scheduled to break ground in 2026.
