= Landover station =

Washington Metro station

Landover
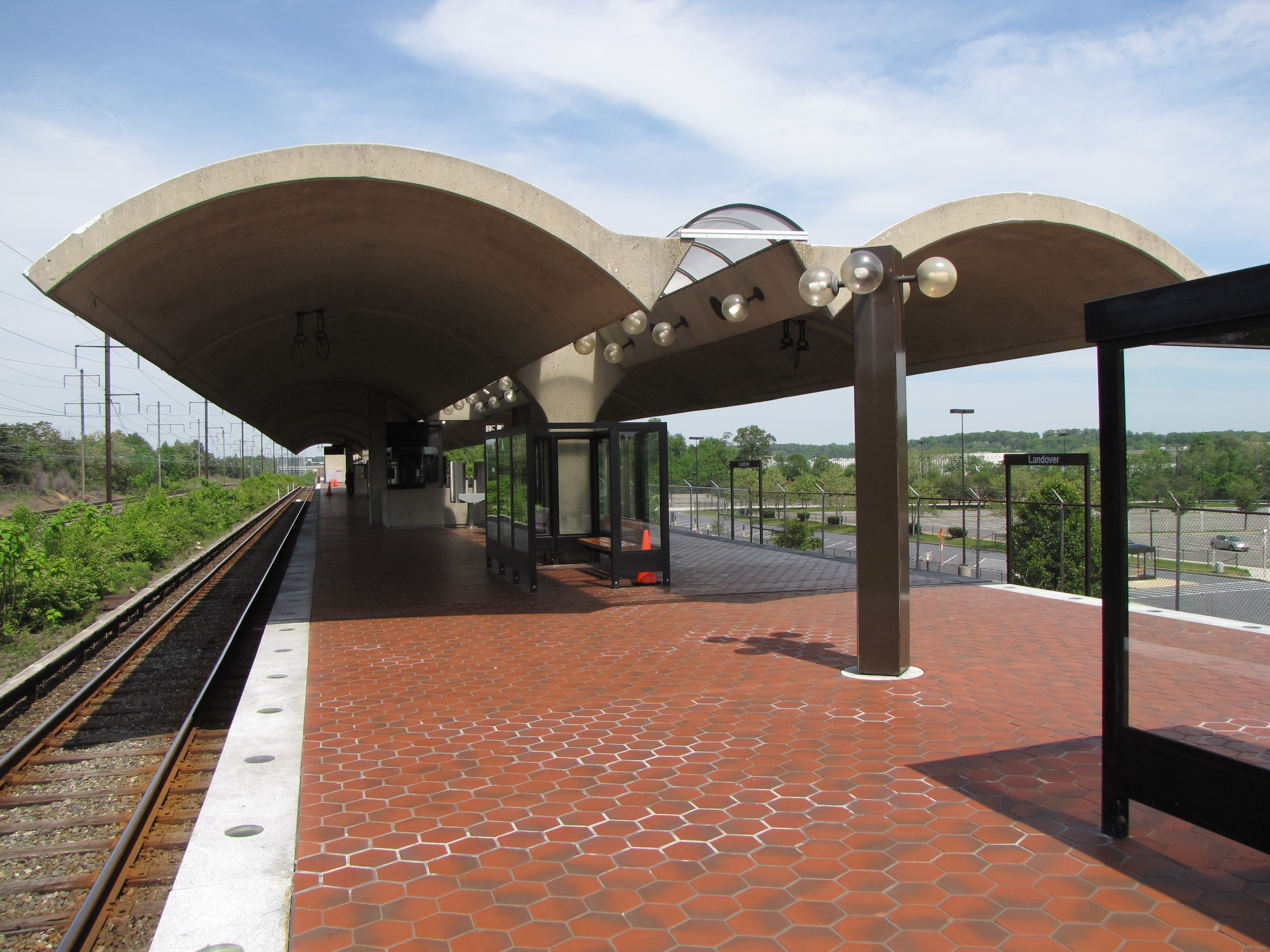
- Station platform facing east in May 2010

General information
- Location: 3000 Pennsy Drive; Hyattsville, Maryland
- Coordinates: 38°56′0.6″N 76°53′28.5″W
- Owner: Washington Metropolitan Area Transit Authority
- Platforms: 1 island platform
- Tracks: 2
- Connections: Metrobus: P41; GoPGC: P44

Construction
- Structure type: At-grade
- Parking: 1,866 spaces
- Cycle facilities: 26 racks, 8 lockers
- Accessible: Yes

Other information
- Station code: D12

History
- Opened: November 20, 1978

Passengers
- 2025: 1,468 (average weekday)
- Rank: 87 of 98

Services
Preceding station	Washington Metro	Following station
Cheverly toward Vienna	Orange Line	New Carrollton Terminus
Cheverly toward Ashburn	Silver Line	New Carrollton Terminus
Former services
Preceding station	Washington Metro	Following station
Cheverly toward Huntington	Blue Line	New Carrollton Terminus
Former services at PRR station
Preceding station	Conrail	Following station
Union Station Terminus	Baltimore-Washington Until August 1982	Lanham toward Baltimore
Preceding station	Pennsylvania Railroad	Following station
Washington, D.C. Terminus	Philadelphia, Wilmington and Baltimore Railroad	Lanham toward Philadelphia
Route map
Location

Landover station is an island-platformed Washington Metro station in Landover, Maryland, United States. The station was opened on November 20, 1978, and is operated by the Washington Metropolitan Area Transit Authority (WMATA). Providing service for the Orange and Silver Lines, the station is in a residential area of Landover at Pennsy Drive near Landover Road. It is primarily a commuter station, with parking for over 1,800 cars.

== History ==
The station opened on November 20, 1978. Its opening coincided with the completion of 7.4 miles (11.9 km) of rail northeast of the Stadium–Armory station and the opening of the Cheverly, Deanwood, Minnesota Avenue, and New Carrollton stations.

The Pennsylvania Railroad (later Penn Central, then Conrail) previously operated a commuter rail stop at Landover, located at Old Landover Road. In August 1982, when Conrail trains began stopping at Capital Beltway station, used by intercity trains since 1970, Lanham and Landover stations were closed.

In May 2018, Metro announced an extensive renovation of platforms at twenty stations across the system. New Carrollton station was closed from May 28, 2022, through September 5, 2022, as part of the summer platform improvement project, which also affected the Minnesota Avenue, Deanwood, Cheverly, and Landover stations on the Orange Line. Shuttle buses and free parking were provided at the closed stations.

On September 10, 2022, Blue Line trains started serving the station due to the 14th Street bridge shutdown as a part of the Blue Plus service. The service ended on May 7, 2023 with the reopening of the Yellow Line.

Half of Silver Line trains began operating between Ashburn and New Carrollton on June 22, 2025.

== Station Layout ==
The Landover station consists of an at-grade island platform south of the Northeast Corridor, paralleling its right-of-way on a slight embankment above the entrance. Eastbound trains use track D1, while track D2 carries westbound trains. The mezzanine, including fare gates and ticket machines, is located below the platform on ground level. Outside of the single entrance on the southeast side of the station is a bus loop and two surface parking lots.
