= Capital Beltway station =

Defunct railway station

Capital Beltway
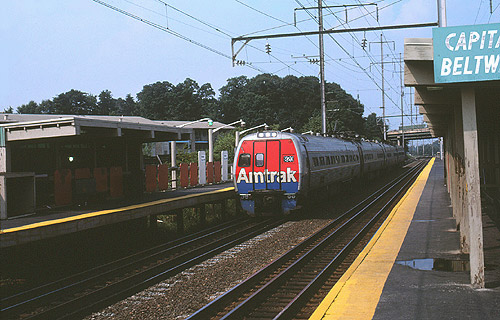
- Capital Beltway in 1979 as an Amtrak Metroliner arrives. Note the green Penn Central signage.

General information
- Coordinates: 38.9554°N 76.8659°W
- Line: Northeast Corridor
- Platforms: 2 side platforms

History
- Opened: March 16, 1970
- Closed: October 30, 1983

Former services
Preceding station	Amtrak	Following station
Washington, D.C. Terminus	Chesapeake	Bowie toward Philadelphia–Suburban
Washington, D.C. Terminus	Metroliner Alighting only	BWI Airport toward New York
Washington, D.C. Terminus	Montrealer	Baltimore toward Montreal
Washington, D.C. Terminus	National Limited	Baltimore toward Kansas City
Preceding station	Conrail	Following station
Union Station Terminus	Baltimore-Washington From August 1982	Seabrook toward Baltimore
Location

Capital Beltway was a railway station in Lanham, Maryland. It was built in 1970 by the Penn Central Transportation Company in partnership with the state of Maryland, the United States Department of Transportation (DOT), and Prince George's County. The station was located on the Northeast Corridor approximately 10 miles (16 km) north of Union Station in Washington, D.C. Its purpose was to provide a stop near the Capital Beltway ring-road for the new high-speed Metroliners. Amtrak used the station until 1983 when New Carrollton opened to the south.

== History ==
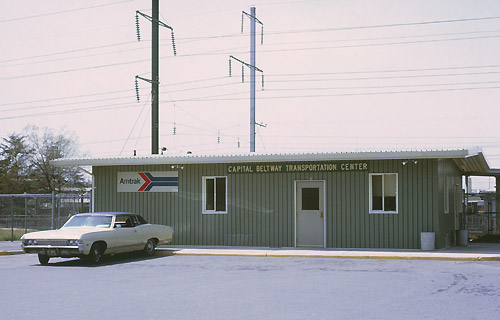
The station building in 1972

Capital Beltway was one of two park-and-ride infill stations proposed in the 1960s for use by the new Metroliners, the other being Metropark station in Woodbridge Township, New Jersey. The two stations were originally named Capital Beltway Metropark and Garden State Metropark, though these were shortened to Capital Beltway and Metropark, respectively. Both were conceived as public-private partnerships. Discussion of the Capital Beltway project began in the mid-1960s before being approved at the end of 1968.

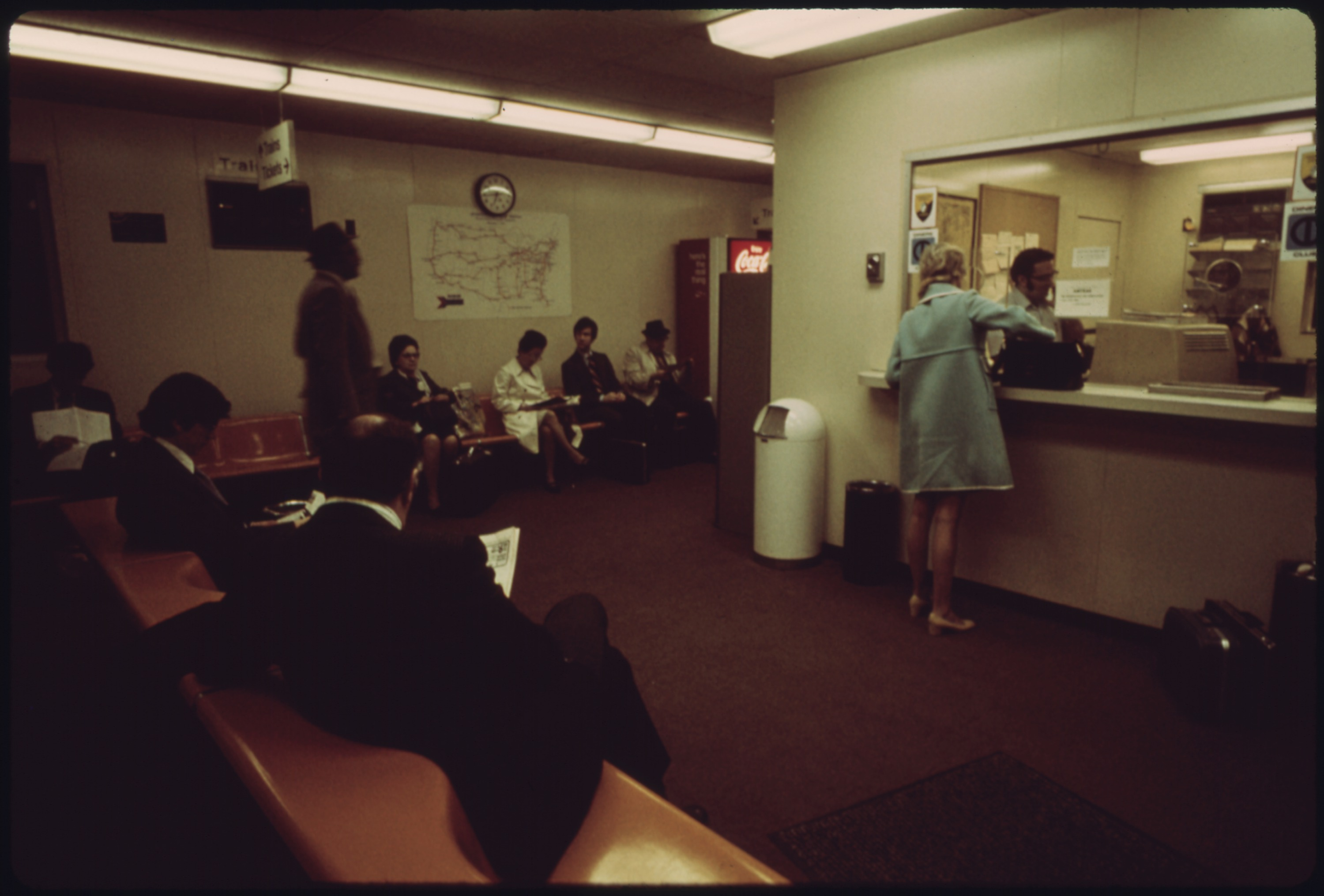
Interior of the cramped waiting room in 1974

The station was built with two high-level platforms, each 850 feet (260 m) long. The two platforms were linked by a pedestrian tunnel. The head house was a 960-square-foot (89 m^{2}) prefabricated building. Adjoining the station was a 200-space parking lot which could be expanded to 1000 spaces if traffic warranted. The station was located just off the Beltway to encourage park-and-ride traffic. Maryland contributed the land for the station, valued at $500,000; DOT contributed $1 million to the project, mostly for physical infrastructure. The parking lot was built by Prince George's County at a cost of $150,000; the county also paid, at the outset, for a night watchman to guard the lot. As part of the project, several grade crossings were eliminated.

The station opened on March 16, 1970, with Secretary of Transportation John Volpe in attendance. Although built as part of the Metroliner project, the station was served by conventional trains as well. DC Transit and Greyhound Lines provided connecting bus service to Annapolis and Rockville, Maryland.

Amtrak continued using Capital Beltway when it assumed control of Penn Central's passenger trains on May 1, 1971. Capital Beltway proved to be inadequate as a station: it was not handicapped accessible and its waiting room, as originally built, had seats for just ten people and no restrooms, with some of the interior space occupied by a bus ticketing office. After connecting bus service ended, this office was converted to restrooms.

In August 1982, Conrail commuter trains (the future MARC Penn Line) began stopping at Capital Beltway; the nearby Lanham and Landover stations were closed. Amtrak and Conrail abandoned Capital Beltway on October 30, 1983, in favor of nearby New Carrollton, which had been a Washington Metro stop since 1978.
