= Riverdale Park =

Riverdale Park may refer to:

- Riverdale Park, California, a community in the United States
- Riverdale Park (Bronx), a park in Riverdale, Bronx, New York City
- Riverdale Park, Maryland, a town in the United States
- Riverdale Park station (disambiguation), light rail stations under construction in Riverdale Park, Maryland
- Riverdale Park (Toronto), a park in Toronto, Canada
