= Riverdale Park North–UMD station =

Future light rail station in Maryland

Riverdale Park North–UMD
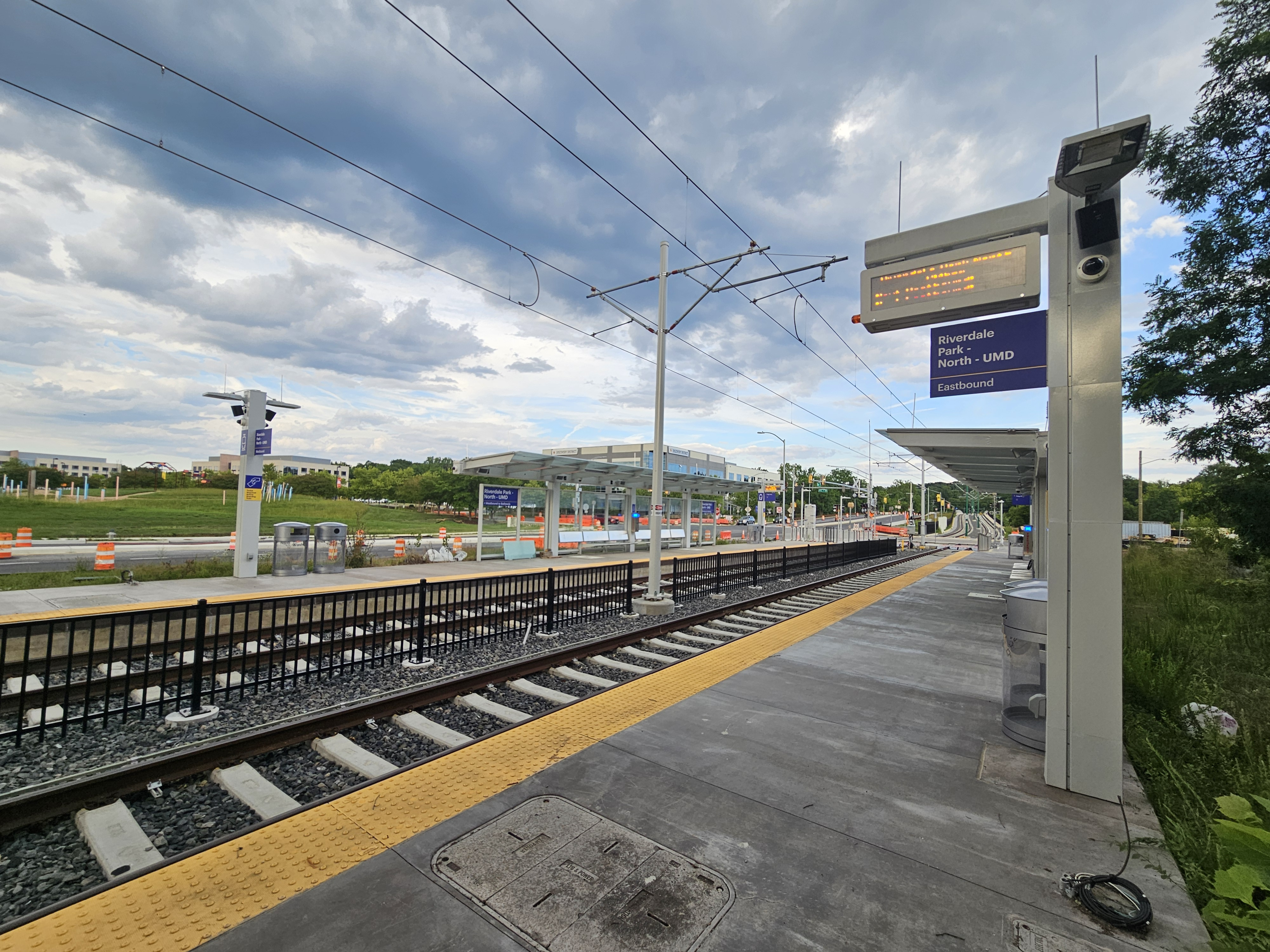
- The station in June 2026

General information
- Location: River Road at Haig Drive; Riverdale Park, Maryland
- Coordinates: 38.96832°N 76.92417°W
- Owner: Maryland Transit Administration
- Platforms: 2 side platforms
- Tracks: 2

Construction
- Parking: None
- Accessible: yes

History
- Opening: 2027 (scheduled)

Services
Preceding station	Maryland Transit Administration	Following station
College Park Metro–UMD toward Bethesda	Purple Line	Riverdale Park–Kenilworth toward New Carrollton
Location

Riverdale Park North–UMD station is an under-construction light rail station in Riverdale Park, Maryland, that will be served by the Purple Line. The station has two side platforms on the south side of River Road just west of Haig Drive. Located in the M Square Research Park, it will be one of five stations serving the University of Maryland, College Park (UMD). As of 2026, the Purple Line is planned to open in late 2027.
