= Riverdale Park–Kenilworth station =

Future light rail station in Maryland

Riverdale Park–Kenilworth
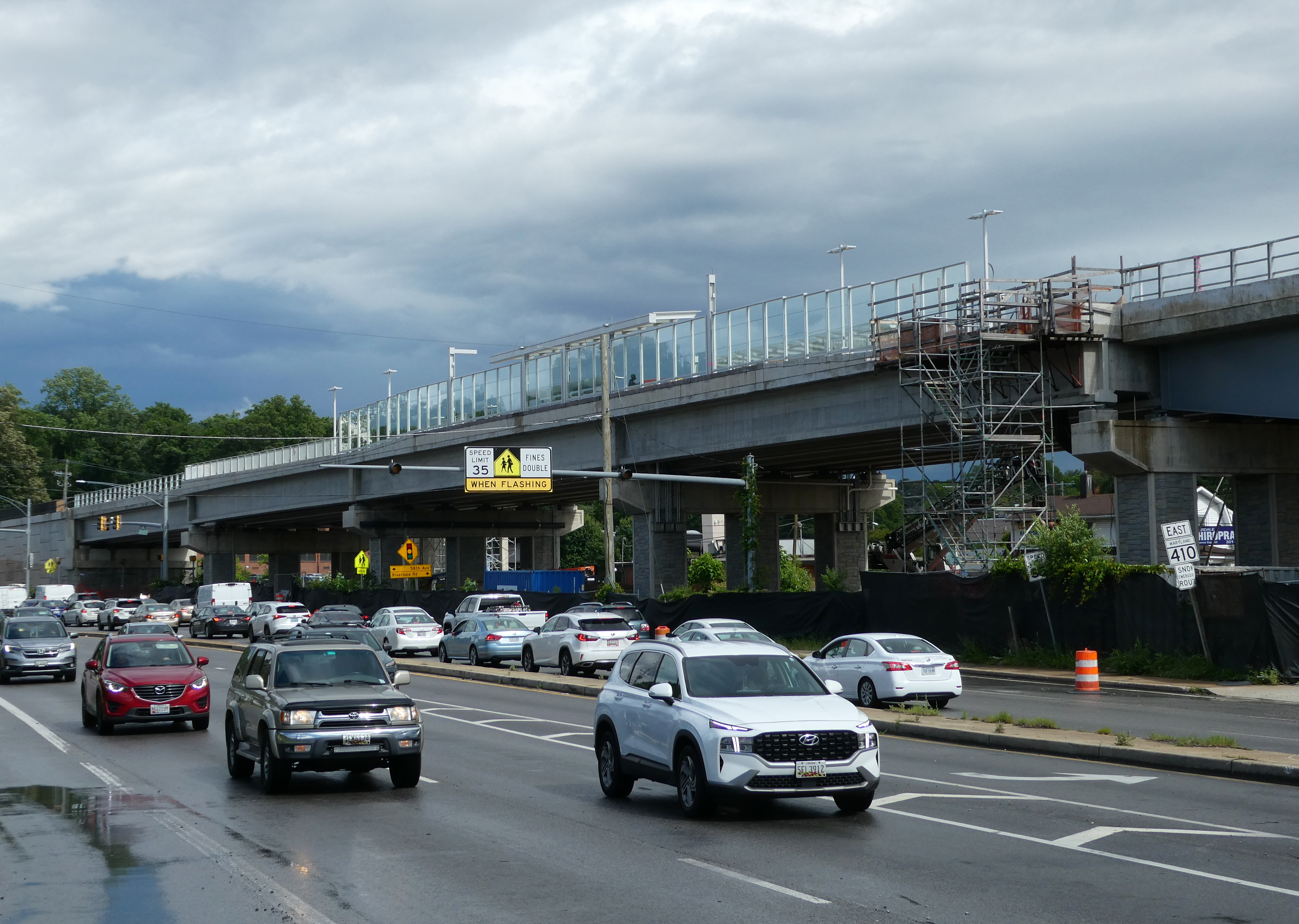
- The station under construction in May 2025

General information
- Location: East West Highway at Kenilworth Avenue; Riverdale Park, Maryland
- Coordinates: 38.96004°N 76.91888°W
- Owner: Maryland Transit Administration
- Platforms: 2 side platforms
- Tracks: 2

Construction
- Structure type: Elevated
- Parking: None
- Accessible: yes

History
- Opening: 2027 (scheduled)

Services
Preceding station	Maryland Transit Administration	Following station
Riverdale Park North–UMD toward Bethesda	Purple Line	Beacon Heights–East Pines toward New Carrollton
Location

Riverdale Park–Kenilworth station is an under-construction light rail station in Riverdale Park, Maryland, that will be served by the Purple Line. The station will be elevated on the south side of Riverdale Road just east of Kenilworth Avenue. It will have two side platforms. As of 2026, the Purple Line is planned to open in late 2027.
