= Central Avenue Line (Maryland) =

Bus route in Maryland, United States

P72, P73
- Central Avenue-Bowie; Central Avenue-Trade Zone

Overview
- System: Metrobus
- Operator: Washington Metropolitan Area Transit Authority
- Garage: Landover
- Livery: Local
- Status: Active
- Predecessors: C21, C22, C26, C27, C29

Route
- Locale: Prince George’s County
- Communities served: Bowie (P72), Collington (P72), Mitchellville (P72), Upper Marlboro, Kingsford, Kettering, Lake Arbor, Woodmore, Largo
- Landmarks served: Bowie Park & Ride Lot (P72), Bowie Town Center (P72), Bowie Health Center (P72), Collington Center (P73), Pointer Ridge, Six Flags America, East Kettering (P72), West Kettering (P73), Lake Arbor (P72), Prince George's Community College, Downtown Largo station
- Start: Downtown Largo station
- Via: Central Avenue
- End: P72: Bowie Park & Ride Lot; P73: Collington Center
- Length: P72: 60 minutes P73: 30 minutes

Service
- Level: P72: Daily; P73: Weekdays
- Frequency: 30-60 Minutes
- Operates: 4:53 AM - 10:11 PM (Weekdays); 8:00 AM - 8:10 PM (Weekends)
- Ridership: 122,588 (C21)(FY 2025); 183,679 (C22)(FY 2025); 208,150 (C26)(FY 2025); 62,872 (C29)(FY 2025)
- Timetable: Central Avenue Line

The Central Avenue Line, designated as Central Avenue–Bowie Line on Route P72, and Central Avenue–Trade Zone Line on Route P73, are bus routes operated by the Washington Metropolitan Area Transit Authority between Downtown Largo station of the Blue and Silver Lines of the Washington Metro and Bowie Park & Ride Lot (P72) or Collington Center (P73). The lines operate every 30 minutes during the weekday peak hours only and 60 minutes at all other times at a combined frequency of 15–30 minutes. Route P72 trips roughly takes 60 minutes to complete, while Route P73 trips take roughly 30 minutes to complete.

== Route Description and Service ==
Routes P72 and P73 operate in Central Prince George's County, Maryland connecting riders between Bowie, Kettering, Six Flags America, and Pointer Ridge to the Washington Metro. Route P72 operates daily, while Route P73 operates during the weekdays. Routes P72 and P73 operate out of Landover division.

== History ==
Service in Central Prince George's County, Maryland was originally operated by various Metrobus lines until the 1990s under the "T" lines. These lines connected Capitol Heights, Maryland to Downtown DC and Central Prince George's County. However the routes were slowly eliminated or terminated at New Carrollton or Addison Road and replaced by Metrorail after 1978. Eventually, the Central Ave-Belair Line (T10, T11), and Bowie-Belair Line (T12, T14) were the main lines operating along Central Avenue.

Eventually, three lines were created to operate into Central Prince George's County. The Pointer Ridge–Addison Road Line (C21, C22, C29), Kingsford–Addison Road Line (C23, C24, C25, and C26), and Pointer Ridge Line (C28). These lines would connect Addison Road station (C21, C22, C23, C24, C25, C26, C29) and New Carrollton station (C28) to East Kettering, Pointer Ridge (C21, C22, C29), Collington Center (C21, C22), and Bowie Town Center (C29). Route C29 would operate on the C28 routing on Saturday between Bowie Town Center and Pointer Ridge plus operate on a combination of the C22 and C26 routing.

On September 20, 1999, route C26 buses going to Addison Road station in the morning was changed to operate westbound on Lake Arbor Way and turn south into Campus Way North. In the afternoon, buses going to East Kettering were also changed to operate north on Campus Way North and turn right into Lake Arbor Way.

Eventually before June 2000, both the Central Avenue Line and Kingsford–Addison Road Line would merge into a single route. Routes C25 and C26 joined the C21, C22, and C29 while routes C23 and C24 were eliminated. The C25 and C26 routing remained the same during the merger of the routes. The line was renamed into the Central Avenue Line as a result. There was no Sunday service on any of the routes.

On December 18, 2004, when the Blue Line extension to Largo Town Center (now Downtown Largo) station opened, routes C21, C22, C26, and C29 was rerouted to serve the new station. Route C25 was eliminated while route C26 was shortened to terminate at Largo Town Center (now Downtown Largo) and would operate on Lake Arbor Way. From Largo, C21, C22, and C29 buses will run via Largo Drive West, Largo Center and Apollo Drives, Lottsford Road, Arena Drive, and Brightseat Road to Central Avenue and Addison Road station. C21 and C22 buses also would serve Centre Pointe Office Park on Brightseat Road. Service to Hampton Towne Centre would be eliminated. New Sunday service was also added to route C29 but only operating between Pointer Ridge and Addison Road station as a combination to routes C22 and C26.

On May 28, 2005, a new route C27 was introduced to operate during the summer seasons between Addison Road station and Pointer Ridge via Largo Town Center (now Downtown Largo) station under a similar routing to the C25. Initially, the line would only operate on Saturdays between Memorial Day and Labor Day weekends, but have since expanded to daily summer service.

On March 18, 2006, route C29 was extended to serve Bowie State University from the intersection of Northview Drive and Collington Road. The current C29 routing via the Bowie Park & Ride lot and South Belair to Belair Center was discontinued due to low ridership. This routing was a combination of routes B21, B22, B24, B25, B27, B29, and B31, during the weekends except serving Addison Road station instead of New Carrollton station.

On February 23, 2018, routes C22 and C29 discontinued service along Harry S. Truman Drive south of Mount Lubentia Way due to a long-term construction project. Stops along Harry S. Truman Drive near Mount Lubentia Way, New Orchard Drive, Woodlawn Boulevard, and Birdie Lane will not be served. Customers may board buses at stops along Mount Lubentia Way near Harry S. Truman Drive. All route C22 and C29 skip the loop and instead turn left onto Mount Lubentia Way. Alternative service is provided by TheBus.

During the COVID-19 pandemic, routes C21, C22, and C26 service was suspended and route C29 operated in its place on its Saturday supplemental schedule between Addison Road and Bowie beginning on March 16, 2020. However beginning on March 18, 2020, route C29 was further reduced to operate on its Sunday schedule daily between Addison Road and Pointer Ridge with service to Bowie suspended. Weekend service was further suspended on March 21, 2020. On August 23, 2020, all route C21, C22, and C26 service was restored operating on its regular schedule while the C29 reverted to weekend only schedule. However, route C29 service to Bowie remained suspended.

In May 2020, WMATA announced that route C27 would not operate during the 2020 summer season due to the ongoing COVID-19 pandemic and Metro's reduced service since March 16, 2020. Alternative service would be provided by routes C29.

On September 10, 2020, as part of WMATA's FY2022 budget, WMATA proposed to eliminate the C29 segment between Pointer Ridge and Bowie State University on Saturday. This was due to low federal funds and proposing to eliminate all route C28 service. Later on February 20, 2021, during WMATA's FY2022 budget crisis, WMATA proposed to extend route C26 to Bowie Park & Ride via Bowie Gateway Center along the C28 and C29 routing along Pittsfield Lane, Mitchellville Road, Peach Walker Drive, Mount Oak Drive, Nottinghill Drive, and Northview Drive during the day to partially replace the B29 and C28. WMATA also proposed to restore Saturday C29 service to Bowie beginning in July 2021. However beginning in January 2022, service to Bowie would be eliminated on the C26 and C29. Subsequently on April 22, 2021, WMATA approved the FY2022 budget and received federal funding to avoid service cuts.

On June 6, 2021, all route C26 service was extended to Bowie Park & Ride via Pointer Ridge, Bowie Health Center, and Bowie Gateway Center via the C28 and C29 routing to partially replace the B29 and C28. All route C29 service to Bowie was also restored on the same day.

Due to rising cases of the COVID-19 Omicron variant, the line was reduced to its Saturday service on weekdays with Routes C21, C22, and C26 being suspended beginning on January 10, 2022. Route C29 would operate in its place. Routes C21, C22, and C26 resumed service when WMATA resumed its weekday service on February 7, 2022.

On June 25, 2023, all C22 trips was extended to Collington Center.

In 2024 during WMATA's FY2024 Budget crisis, WMATA proposed to eliminate all C21, C22, and C26 service and replace it with Route C29. Route C29 would operate its full route during the weekdays, have Saturday service end at Pointer Ridge, and eliminate all Sunday service. However on April 25, 2024, Metro’s Board of Directors approved a $4.8 billion capital and operating budget which avoided service cuts.

=== Better Bus Redesign ===
In 2022, WMATA launched its Better Bus Redesign project, which aimed to redesign the entire Metrobus Network and is the first full redesign of the agency's bus network in its history.

In April 2023, WMATA launched its Draft Visionary Network. As part of the drafts, WMATA proposed multiple changes to the Central Avenue Line.

One of the proposed routes was named Route MD355 and would operate on the current C26 and C29 routing between Downtown Largo station and Bowie Park & Ride. However, the route would skip the Kettering loop, and Route C29 service to Bowie State University was taken over by the proposed Route MD347. Service between Pointer Ridge and Bowie Park & Ride would also be modified to take over parts of the current B21, B22, and B24 routing in Bowie.

Another proposed route was named Route MD356 and would follow the C21 routing between Downtown Largo station and Collington Center. However, the route would serve the Kettering loop. The C21, C22, C26, C27, and C29 portion between Downtown Largo station and Addison Road station was made into a single route as Route MD258 and was extended to Stadium–Armory station via East Capitol Street SE, Capitol Heights station, Benning Road station, C Street NE, 22nd Street NE, Independence Avenue SE, and 19th Street NE. Late night service Route MD258 service would be extended to Washington Union Station via East Capitol Street and Massachusetts Avenue NE.

During WMATA's Revised Draft Visionary Network, all three proposed routes were retained by WMATA and were renamed to Routes P51 (MD258), P72 (MD355), and P73 (MD356). Routes P72 and P73 saw minor changes to their proposals, with the Kettering Loop now being served by the proposed P72 (MD355) instead of the P73 (MD356). The P72 also added service to Bowie Health Center. Route P51 saw the most changes, with service being cut back to Capitol Heights station and service to Stadium-Armory station not being included in the proposals. All changes were then proposed during WMATA's 2025 Proposed Network.

During the proposals, WMATA merged the proposed Route P51 routing with the proposed Route P63 routing into one route. The new route P63 would operate between Downtown Largo station and Naylor Road station via a modified P51 routing between Downtown Largo station and Capitol Heights station via Central Avenue, Garrett A. Morgan Boulevard, Morgan Boulevard station, and East Capitol Street, then would operate along Davey Street, and Capitol Heights Boulevard before operating on the proposed P63 routing (and a modified routing of the F14) to Naylor Road station via Larchmont Avenue, Marlboro Pike, Southern Avenue SE, and Branch Avenue.

On November 21, 2024, WMATA approved its Better Bus Redesign Network, with the line being modified into three routes.

Beginning on June 29, 2025, the portion between Addison Road station and Downtown Largo station was renamed into the P63 and was modified to also serve Morgan Boulevard station and was extended to Naylor Road station, following the former F14 route between Addison Road and Naylor Road via Capitol Heights station, Larchmont Avenue, Marlboro Pike, and Southern Avenue.

Routes C21 and C22 were combined into the C21 and renamed into the P73, operating between Downtown Largo station and Collington Center, and eliminated service along Hall Road to Pointer Ridge. Routes C26, C27, and C29 were combined and renamed into the P72, operating along the former C26 routing between Downtown Largo and Pointer Ridge via East Kettering. The line then operates on the former C29 along Mitchellville Road, discontinuing service along Peach Walker Drive, Nottinghill Drive, and Northview Drive. The line then follows the C26 routing in Bowie, ending at Bowie Park & Ride. Saturday service to Bowie State University was discontinued.

The former C21, C26, C27, and C29 designations were later given to the V7/W4 (C21), W6/W8 (C26), W1 (C27), and W2/W3 (C29).

During the 2025 summer season, Route P73 was given limited weekend service to supplement the P72 and riders additional options to and from Six Flags America. Following Six Flags America's closure on November 2, 2025, the limited weekend service for Route P73 was also discontinued as there was no need for the extra service.
