= Seabrook station =

Railway station in Seabrook, Maryland

Seabrook
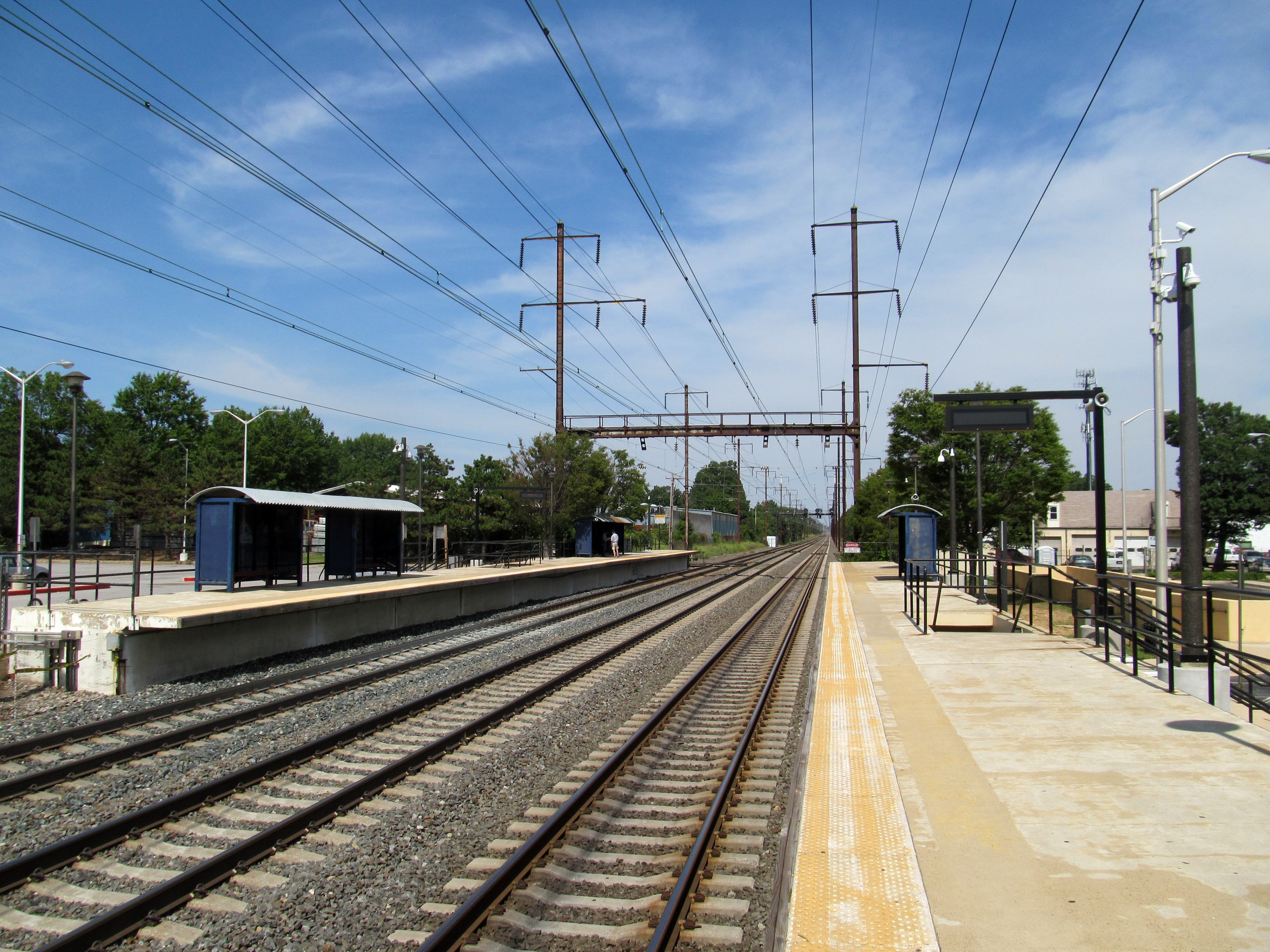
- Seabrook station platforms in August 2014

General information
- Location: 6221 Seabrook Road; Seabrook, Maryland
- Coordinates: 38°58′23″N 76°50′36″W
- Owner: Amtrak
- Line: Amtrak Northeast Corridor
- Platforms: 2 side platforms
- Tracks: 3
- Connections: Metrobus: P20

Construction
- Parking: 264 spaces
- Accessible: Yes

History
- Opened: April 30, 1984
- Rebuilt: 1980s
- Electrified: 1935

Passengers
- 2018: 517 daily ▲25.5%

Services
| Preceding station | MARC | Following station |
|---|---|---|
| New Carrollton toward Union Station | Penn Line | Bowie State toward Perryville |
Former services
| Preceding station | MARC | Following station |
|---|---|---|
| New Carrollton toward Union Station | Penn Line | Bowie Pre-1989 toward Perryville |
| Preceding station | Conrail | Following station |
| Lanham Pre-1982 toward Union Station | Baltimore-Washington | Bowie toward Baltimore |
| Capital Beltway 1982-1983 toward Union Station | Baltimore-Washington | Bowie toward Baltimore |
| New Carrollton 1983 toward Union Station | Baltimore-Washington | Bowie toward Baltimore |
| Preceding station | Pennsylvania Railroad | Following station |
| Lanham toward Washington, D.C. | Philadelphia, Wilmington and Baltimore Railroad | Glenndale toward Philadelphia |
Location

Seabrook station is a station on the Northeast Corridor located in the unincorporated community of Seabrook, Maryland, United States. It is served by most weekday MARC Penn Line trains; all Amtrak and weekend MARC Penn Line trains pass through without stopping. It is located at 6221 Seabrook Road south of Lanham Severn Road (Maryland Route 564) in Seabrook, although MARC gives the location as being in Lanham, Maryland. The station is unstaffed and is located at the end of a dead-end street. Parking is available on the southeast corner of the official address, and also on the opposite side of the tracks on the northeast corner of Seabrook Road and Smith Avenue.

== Station layout ==
The present high-level platforms were built in the late 1980s, replacing bare asphalt platforms near the now-closed Seabrook Road level crossing. Prior to the mid-1980s two grade crossings were located just northeast of the station near Glenn Dale, Maryland. They were both closed as part of the Northeast Corridor Improvement Plan and replaced with a barrier on the old crossings.
