= Bowie Town Center =

Shopping mall in Maryland, United States

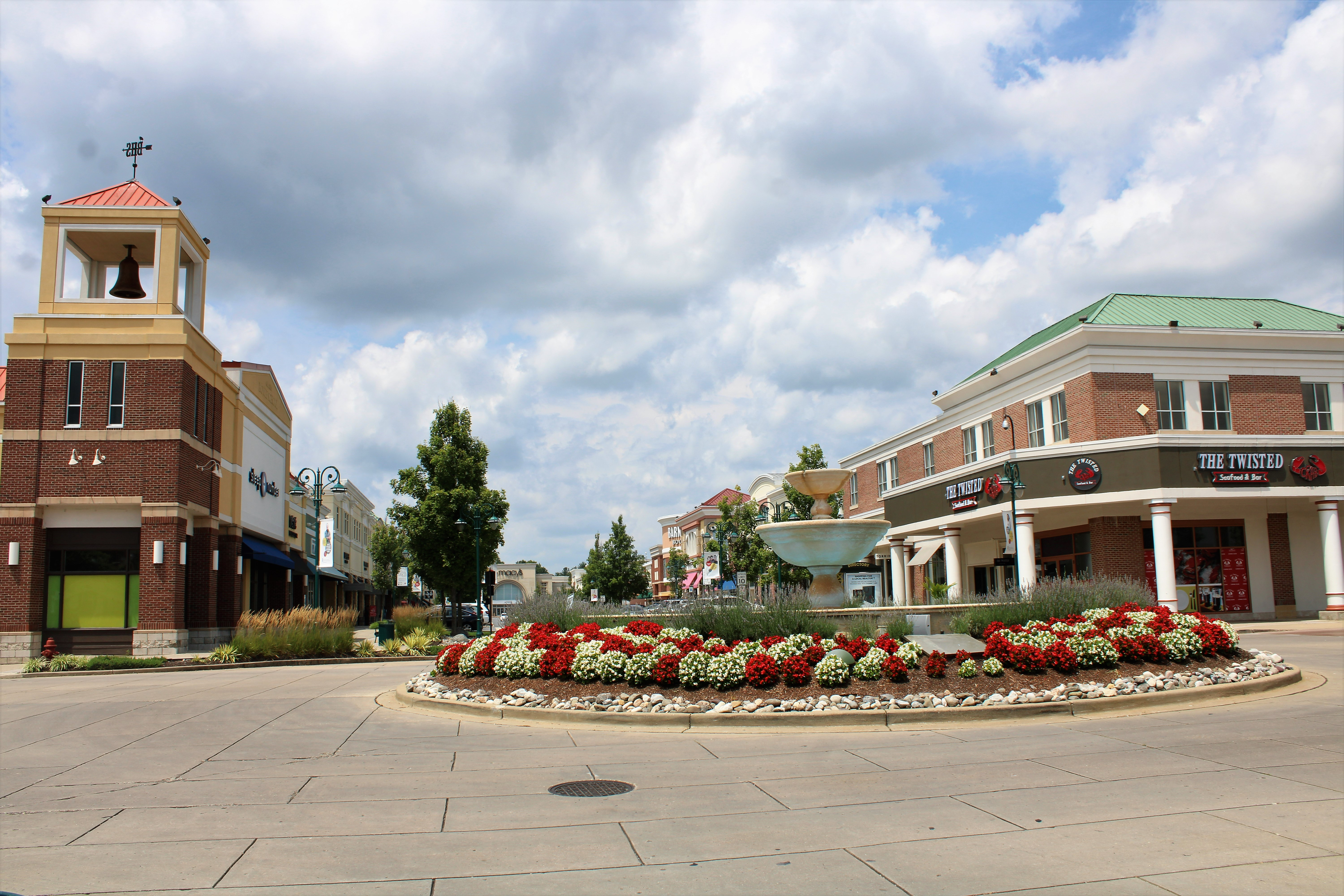
- Location: Bowie, Maryland, U.S.
- Coordinates: 38°56′38″N 76°44′07″W
- Address: 15606 Emerald Way
- Opened: November 2001
- Owner: Washington Prime Group
- Num. of stores: 79
- Num. of anchor tenants: 5 (3 open, 2 vacant)
- Floor area: 755,000 sq ft (70,100 m^{2})
- Floors: 1
- Public transit: Metrobus: P72; GoPGC: P71

Bowie Town Center is an outdoor shopping mall located in Bowie, Maryland that opened in November 2001. The mall is located on Emerald Way near the interchange of US Route 301 and US Route 50. Bowie Town Center has 79 stores including Macy's, Safeway, and LA Fitness.

== History ==
The town center opened in 2001 with anchors Sears, Hecht's, Barnes & Noble, Old Navy, and Bed Bath & Beyond with Safeway and Best Buy soon to open. Safeway opened in early 2002, with a 65,000 sq ft store that included an in-store Starbucks, a prepared foods department, and a dry cleaners in addition to a redesigned store layout. Hecht's closed on September 9, 2006, and was converted into Macy's. Bed Bath & Beyond closed its doors on September 7, 2012. LA Fitness opened its doors at the former Bed Bath & Beyond space on November 15, 2013. In 2015, Sears Holdings spun off 235 of its properties, including the Sears at Bowie Town Center, into Seritage Growth Properties. On October 15, 2018, it was announced the Sears store would be closing as part of a plan to close 142 stores nationwide as a result of filing for Chapter 11 bankruptcy. The Sears store closed January 6, 2019. Best Buy closed on September 21, 2023.

== Current tenants ==
- Safeway (2001–present)
- Macy's (2006–present)
- LA Fitness (2013–present)
- United Furniture Warehouse (2024–present)

== Former tenants ==
- Best Buy (2001–2023)
- Sears (2001–2019)
- Hecht's (2001–2006)
- Bed Bath & Beyond (2001–2012)
