= Glenridge station =

Future light rail station in Maryland

Glenridge
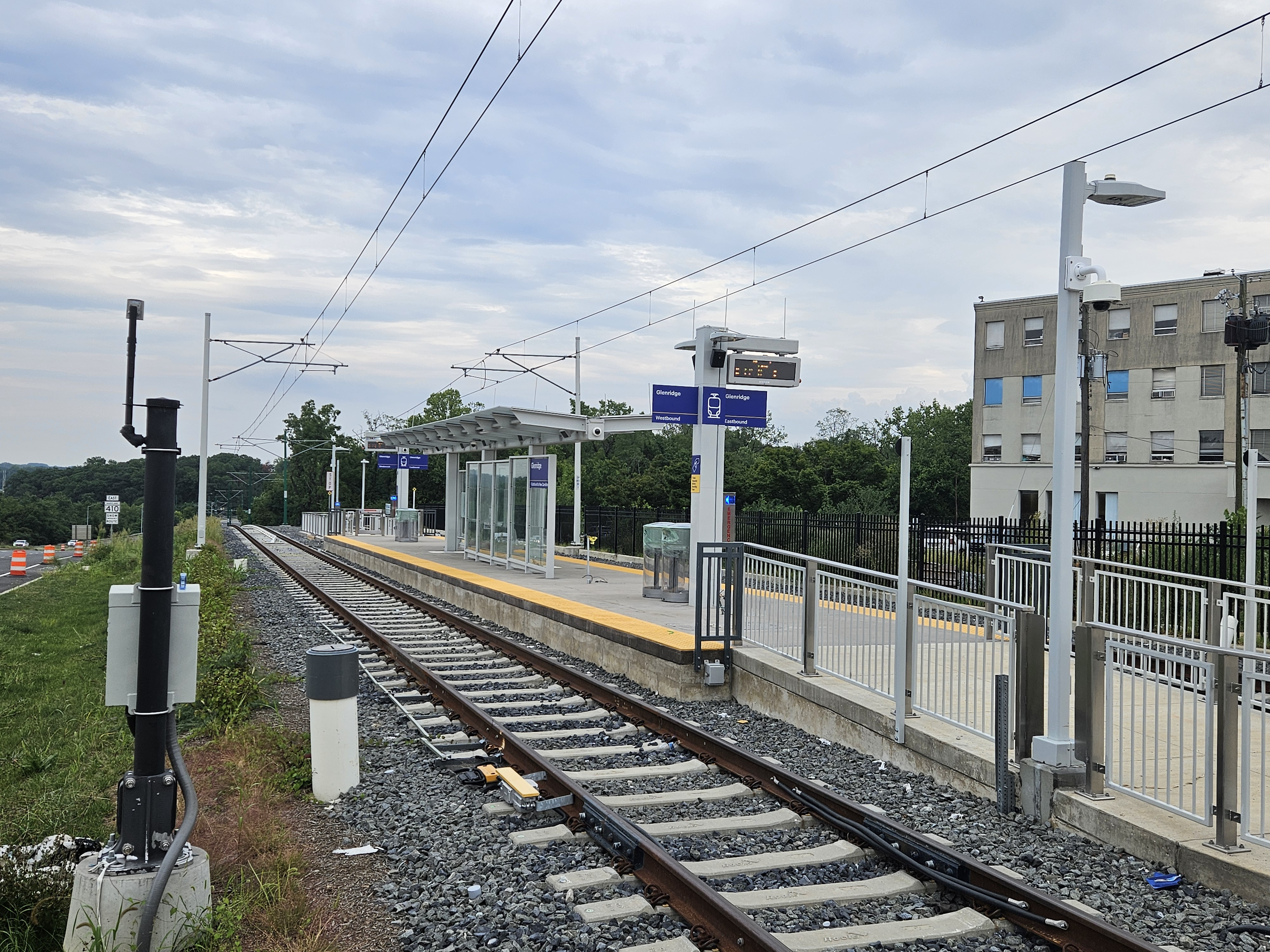
- Glenridge station under construction in August 2026

General information
- Location: Veterans Parkway at Annapolis Road; Hyattsville, Maryland
- Coordinates: 38.95102°N 76.88519°W
- Owner: Maryland Transit Administration
- Platforms: 1 island platform
- Tracks: 2

Construction
- Parking: None
- Accessible: yes

History
- Opening: 2027 (scheduled)

Services
Preceding station	Maryland Transit Administration	Following station
Beacon Heights–East Pines toward Bethesda	Purple Line	New Carrollton Terminus
Location

Glenridge station is an under-construction light rail station in Hyattsville, Maryland, that will be served by the Purple Line. The station has an island platform on the west side of Veterans Parkway just south of Annapolis Road. Original plans called for side platforms. As of 2026, the Purple Line is planned to open in late 2027.

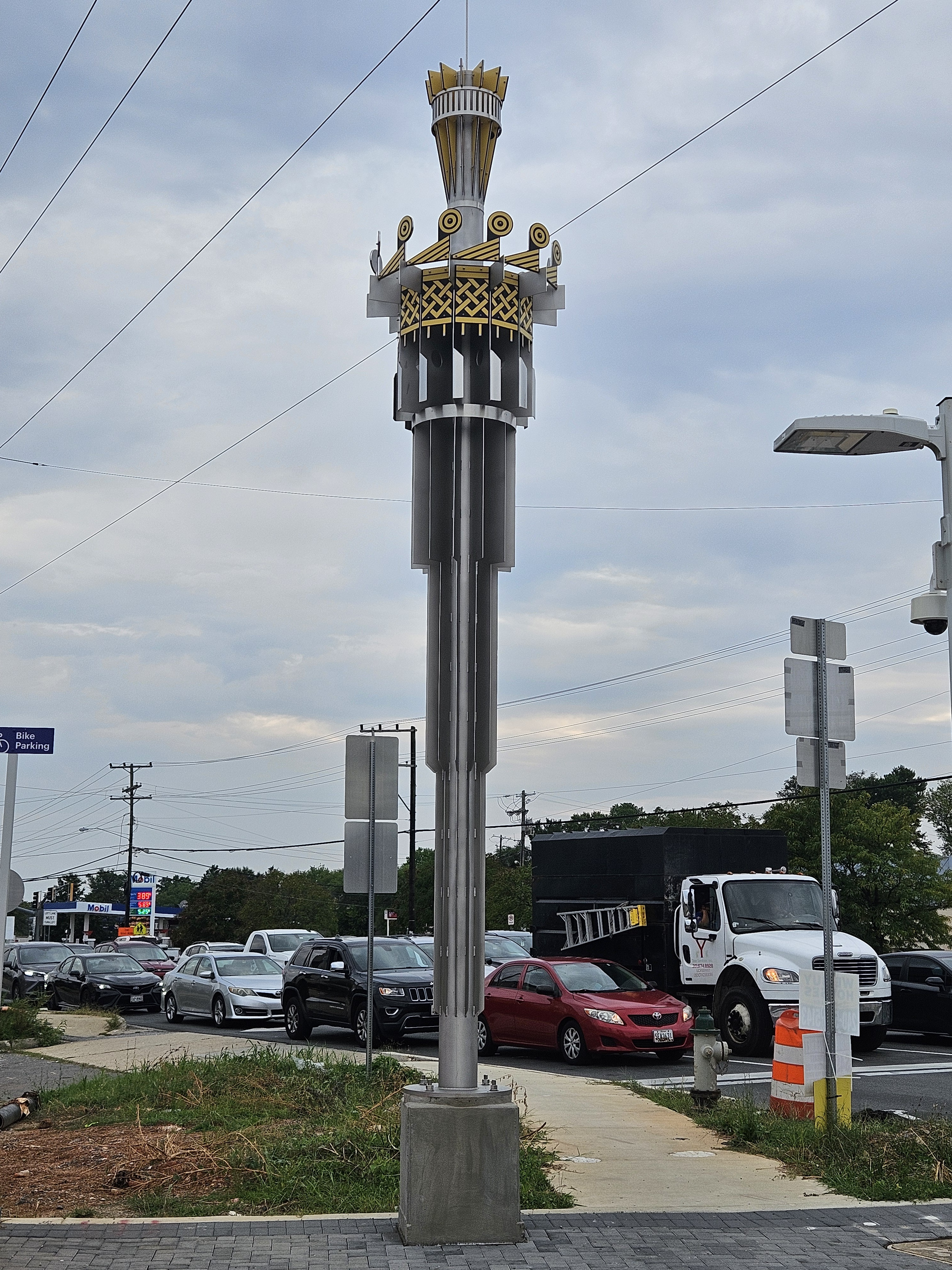
Turning Point in August 2026.

The station features an Art-in-Transit installation to the west of the island platform known as Turning Point. The installation is a 20 feet (6.1 m)-high stainless steel pylon finished in gold leaf, and according to the artist represents gears transformed to jewels as rail transforms a community.
