= Capital Plaza Mall =

Capital Plaza
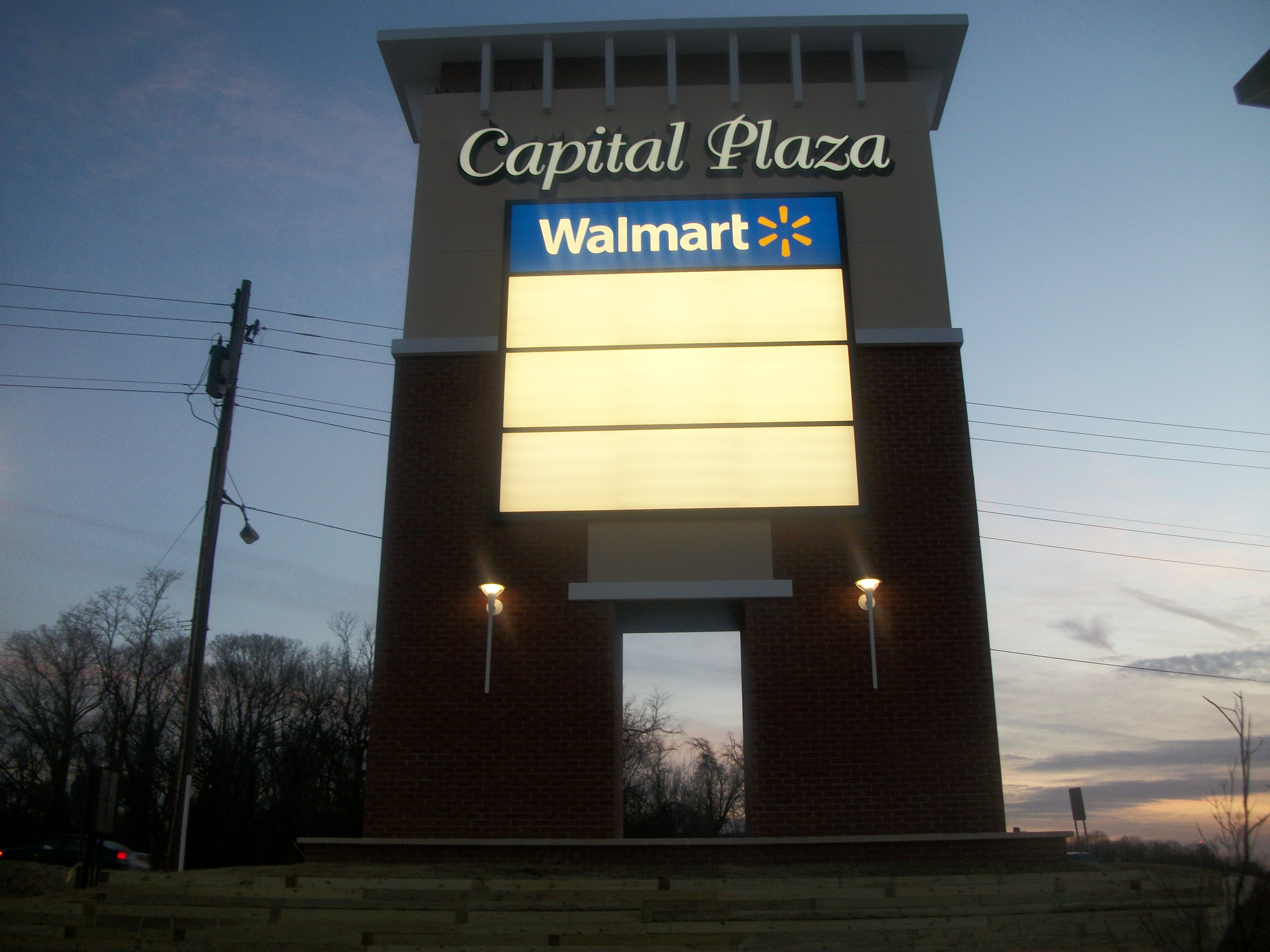
- The Capital Plaza sign as seen from MD 450
- Location: 6200 Annapolis Road in Landover Hills, MD 20784
- Coordinates: 38°56′29.4″N 76°54′29.5″W
- Opened: 1963
- Closed: 2005 (demolished 2007)
- Owner: Nellis Corporation
- Num. of anchor tenants: 2
- Floor area: 491,650 square feet (46,000 m^{2})
- Floors: 1

Capital Plaza Mall (the region now known as simply Capital Plaza) was a shopping mall located at the intersection of Annapolis Road (Maryland Route 450) and the Baltimore–Washington Parkway in Landover Hills, Maryland. It was built between 1961 and 1963, as a regional shopping center to serve the Bladensburg and Landover area of suburban Washington, D.C. The mall was a major attraction in Prince George's County, until its slow decline that began in the 1970s. This continued until the mall's closure in 2005, and ultimately its demolition in 2007. Part of the grounds are now occupied by a Walmart store.

== History ==
=== Development and opening ===
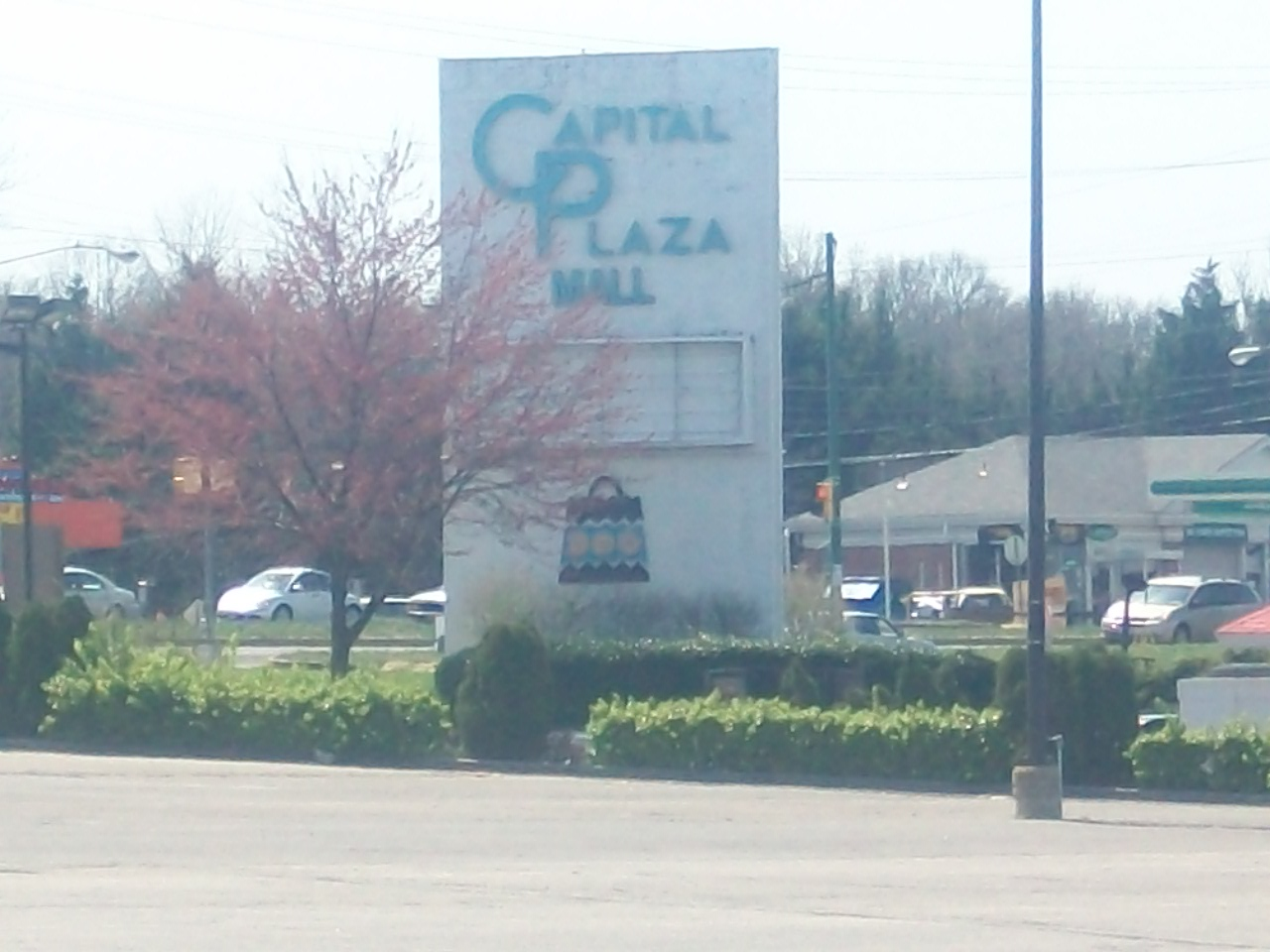
The original main entrance sign to the mall.

The opening day festivities on August 7, 1963, were themed by the popular movie Around the World in 80 Days, and featured representatives from a dozen foreign countries, including Miss Universe Ieda Maria Vargas of Brazil. Maryland Governor J. Millard Tawes officiated the grand opening. The $11 million shopping center originally consisted of 45 stores, which included branches of S.S. Kresge, Kroger, People's Drug Store, Thom McAn Shoes, Lerner's, and a Hot Shoppes drive-in restaurant. The complex also included a movie theater and a professional building.

During the late 1980s, an Auntie Anne's Pretzel Shop and Cinnabon Store also opened inside Capital Plaza, next to the movie theater. The two anchor stores that were the mall's major attractions were Montgomery Ward and the later Bradlees, which opened and operated briefly in 1982 as Memco until it became a branch of the Washington, D.C.–based home improvement Hechinger retail stores.

Capital Plaza was a whole new concept in Prince George's County shopping in the Woodlawn and Landover Hills areas, during the 1960s. This was the first mall-style shopping center—called a "plaza" because of its open-air design featuring lighted fountains, trees, and benches. Capital Plaza was once the main shopping mall in the central Prince George's County area other than Prince George's Plaza, prior to the opening of Landover Mall.

Capital Plaza's prime location along Maryland Route 450 and the Baltimore-Washington Parkway made it ideal for shoppers by both automobile and public transit. Local bus service to Capital Plaza operated along Annapolis Road, linking the plaza with shoppers from the nearby neighborhoods of College Park, Hyattsville, Riverdale, Rogers Heights, Edmonston, Bladensburg, Colmar Manor, Cottage City, Brentwood, Mount Rainier, Villa Heights, Cheverly, Landover Hills, Landover, New Carrollton, Lanham, Glenarden, and even certain pockets of Washington, D.C. (provided by the old WMA Transit Company, until later becoming the Metrobus system). In the late 1970s-80s, Capital Plaza even featured a Trailways bus station. Neighboring shopping featured Robert Hall Men's and Kinney Shoes, Shakey's Pizza, and a Grand Union Market along Annapolis Road.

=== Decline and closure ===
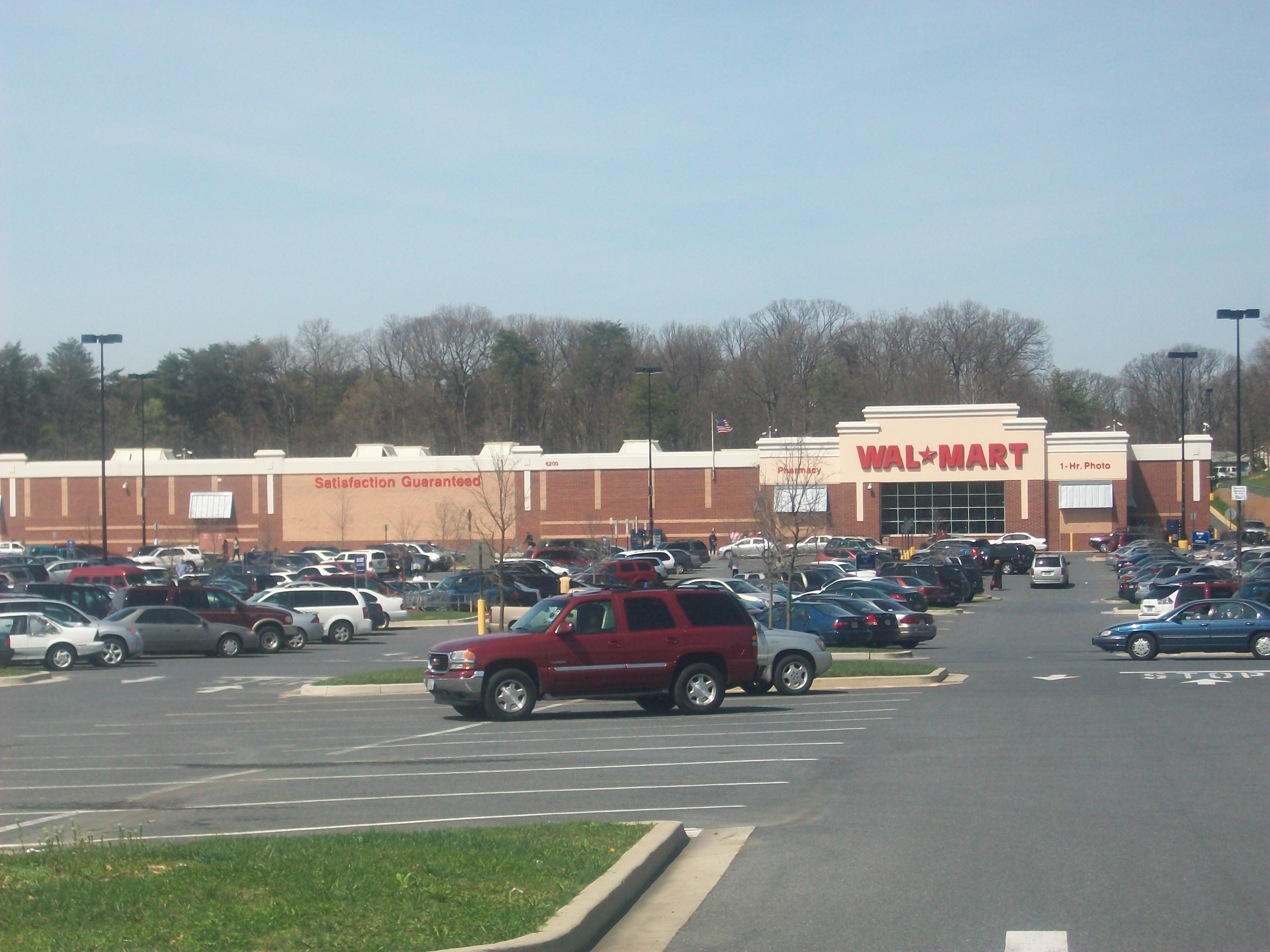
The Wal-Mart store that was built on the grounds on which the former mall once stood

Following the opening of nearby Landover Mall in the 1970s, Capital Plaza began a long, slow decline. The plaza grounds also served as the local home of the UniverSoul Circus, in hopes of attracting more customers to the mall. Between 1999 and 2000, the parent companies for the mall's two anchor stores, Hechinger and Montgomery Ward, both filed for Chapter 11 bankruptcy. In the end, both retailers closed over 100 of their retail stores, including the ones at Capital Plaza, by the end of 2000. By 2005, nearly all of the mall's smaller tenants closed and moved out of the location. This resulted in the closure of the mall by its owner Nellis Corporation.

=== Demolition and successor ===
The site was leased by Wal-Mart, which demolished the mall to build the first (and only, until December 4, 2013, when two Wal-Marts opened in Washington, D.C.) Wal-Mart store inside the Capital Beltway. The new Wal-Mart opened in March 2007 and featured over 11,000 applicants for 330 jobs. As of October 2018, both signs that advertised the mall are still standing: the one located at the entrance which had the features of the mall listed and the one located off of MD 450 that has been renovated to promote the area's new name of simply Capital Plaza. The UniverSoul circus, an attraction that begun when the mall was standing, still rents out the location to host its events. Unlike before when it rented the parking lot across the mall, it now rents the area that is fenced where the west wing of the mall once stood. Still standing near the Wal-Mart is the McDonald's, United Bank (formerly Chevy Chase Bank and Capital One Bank), and an international supermarket (formerly Safeway) that were in business during the Capital Plaza Mall tenure. The former Hot Shoppes building, long vacant, was demolished on August 10, 2015. A Royal Farms gas station opened in front of the former mall property in January 2020, with additional retail, including Starbucks and Tropical Smoothie Cafe, opening later in 2020. A Chick-fil-A opened on another pad site in January 2023. A Chipotle Mexican Grill with a pick up lane opened in October 2023.
