= Penn Line =

MARC commuter rail service from Washington, D.C., to Perryville, Maryland

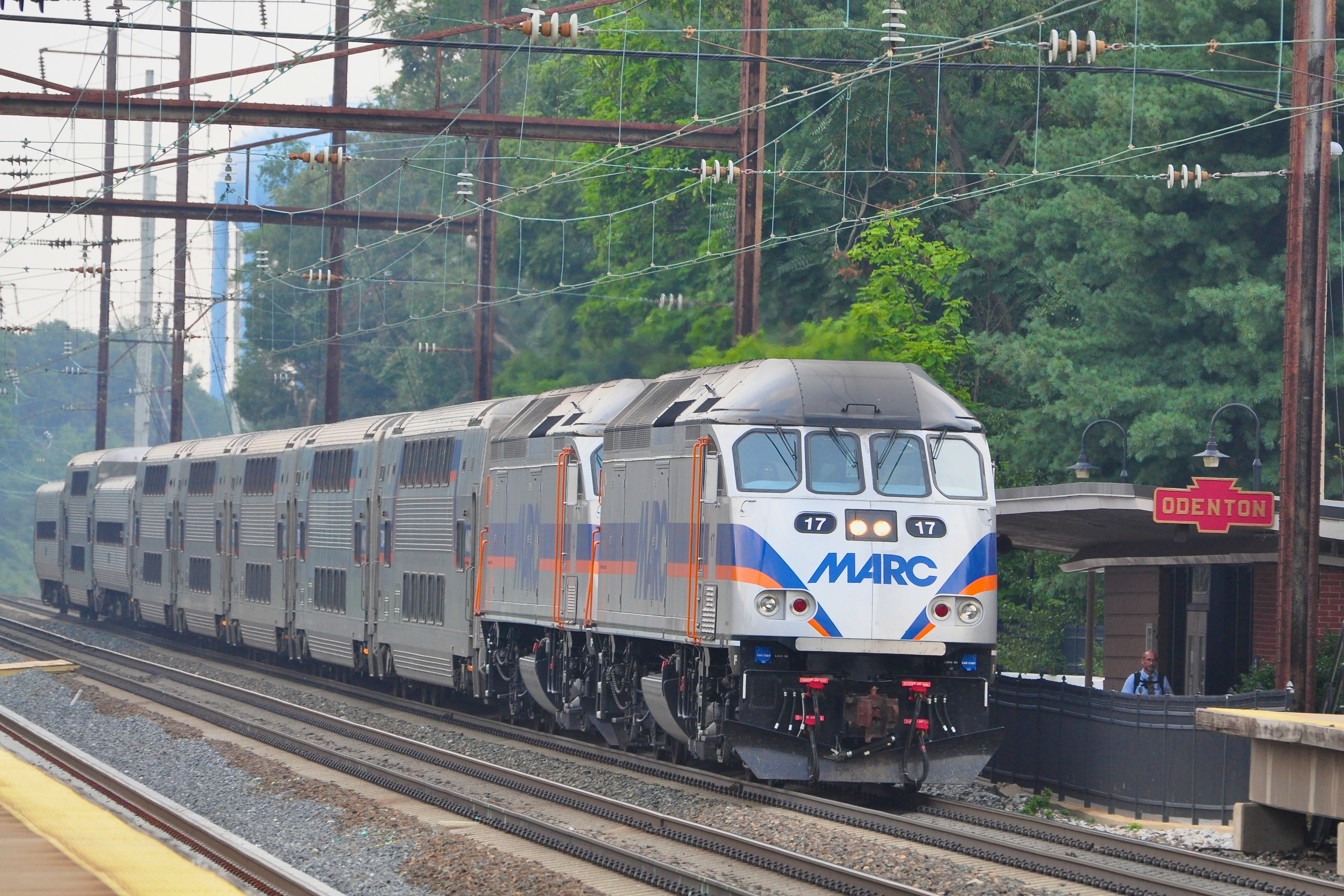
- A Penn Line train at Odenton station

Overview
- Owner: Maryland Transit Administration
- Locale: Washington, D.C., and Maryland suburbs east; Baltimore and suburbs northeast
- Termini: Washington, D.C. Union Station; Perryville, MD
- Stations: 13

Service
- Type: Commuter rail
- System: MARC Train
- Train number: 400–499, 502–579, 610–698
- Operator: Amtrak (under contract)
- Daily ridership: 24,267

History
- Opened: 1881

Technical
- Line length: 77 mi (124 km)
- Track gauge: 4 ft 8 1/2 in (1,435 mm) standard gauge
- Electrification: Overhead line, 12 kV 25 Hz AC
- Operating speed: 44 mph (71 km/h) (avg.); 125 mph (201 km/h) (top)
Route map
Penn Line highlighted in red

The Penn Line is a MARC passenger rail service operating between Union Station in Washington, D.C., and Perryville, Maryland, along the far southern leg of the Northeast Corridor; most trains terminate at Baltimore's Penn Station. It is MARC's only electrified line, though a majority of trains remain diesel powered. With trains operating at speeds of up to 125 miles per hour (201 km/h), it is the fastest commuter rail line in the United States. The service is operated by Amtrak under contract to the Maryland Transit Administration. MARC sets the schedules, owns most of the stations, and controls fares, while Amtrak owns and maintains the right-of-way, supplies employees to operate trains, and maintains the rolling stock. It is by far the busiest of MARC's three lines, with twice as many trains and riders as the Brunswick and Camden lines combined. It is also the only MARC line with weekend service.

The Penn Line is the successor to commuter services between Washington and Baltimore provided by the Pennsylvania Railroad, Penn Central, and Conrail dating back as early as 1881. Additionally, Amtrak operated a commuter service named the Chesapeake from Washington to Suburban Station in Philadelphia between 1978 and 1983.

In 1983, Maryland, along with a number of other Northeastern states, took control of its commuter railroads. Amtrak, which had acquired the right-of-way from Penn Central, took over operation of the former Pennsylvania Railroad commuter line, which was rebranded as AMDOT (Amtrak/Maryland Department of Transportation). The Amtrak Chesapeake was discontinued later in 1983 due to low ridership and redundancy with AMDOT; a year later, all commuter rail service in Maryland was merged under the MARC brand.

With frequent MARC and Amtrak service, the Washington-Baltimore section of the Northeast Corridor is one of the busiest rail lines in the United States.

== Rolling stock ==
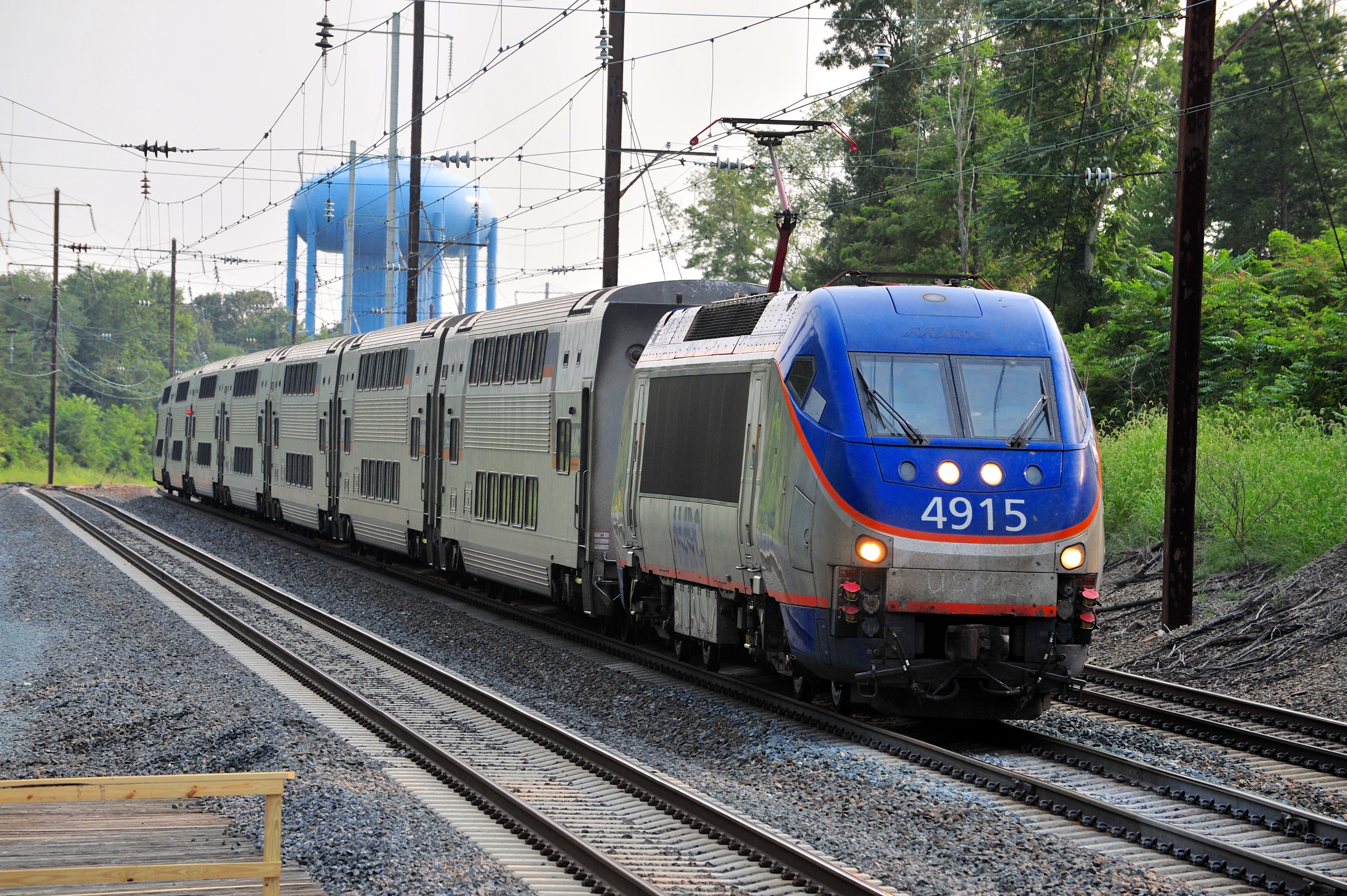
Electric MARC HHP-8 at Odenton station.

The Penn Line uses diesel as well as electric locomotives for powering trains. Most electric and rush hour diesel trains are 6-8 cars long, and are primarily made up of Kawasaki bi-levels. During the day, shorter 4-6 car MultiLevels or single level diesel trains from the Brunswick and Camden lines are used on the Penn Line. For the spring and summer months, weekend Penn Line trains also include a single-level Bike Car that is specially equipped to accommodate bicyclists.

All trains are operated in push-pull configuration, with the cab-car end facing towards Washington.

All of the stations from Washington Union Station up to Penn Station, with the exception of West Baltimore, have high-level platforms, while all of the subsequent stations up to Perryville have low-level platforms.

== Service ==
MARC runs 58 Penn Line trains during a normal weekday. A majority of these trains (29 each day) operate along a 39 mi (63 km) stretch between Union Station in Washington and Penn Station in Baltimore. An additional five trains run between Union Station and Martin State Airport in Middle River, Maryland, while eleven trains run along the entire 77 mi (124 km) corridor between Union Station and Perryville. A single morning train and a single evening train run between Perryville and Penn Station, and a single early morning train runs from Martin State Airport to Penn Station. Unlike MARC's other two lines, the Penn Line operates all throughout the day and well into the night rather than solely during peak hours.

On December 7, 2013, the Penn Line also began offering limited weekend service. Penn Line weekend service consists of 9 round trips on Saturday and 6 round trips on Sunday—primarily between Penn Station and Union Station. Several trains extend service to Martin State Airport, and all trains skip Seabrook.

Beginning on December 13, 2014, a separate Bike Car was added to some weekend Penn Line trains. Bike Cars are reconditioned Sumitomo/Nippon Sharyo MARC IIA single-level commuter railcars. One side of each car's interior is lined with bicycle racks which are arranged to secure 23 full-sized, non-collapsible bicycles, and the other side provides seating for 40 passengers. The Bike Car program was expanded during 2015 to include all weekend trains. There is no extra charge for using the Bike Car, which is available on a first-come, first-served basis. Beginning in 2016, MARC began installing bike racks on its bi-level train cars and some of its single-level cars. Weekday service was intended to begin in summer 2018, however, this was delayed several times. Eventually, 35 Penn Line railcars had full-sized bicycle racks installed, and weekday use of the bike racks on the MARC Penn line officially began on January 21, 2019. These railcars are available on most weekday rush-hour Penn Line trains and on all weekend trains. As with the former Bike Cars, these services are first-come, first served with no additional charge, and the bicyclist must make sure to be able to access the platform of the station they desire.

Amtrak's Acela, Northeast Regional, and other long-distance trains share tracks along the whole of the Penn Line. Washington Union and Baltimore Penn are the second and eighth busiest Amtrak stations in the country, respectively. Amtrak connections are also available at Aberdeen, BWI Airport, and New Carrollton. MARC passengers with monthly and weekly tickets can ride select Amtrak Northeast Regional trains during the week only, as part of their cross-honoring agreement. Connections are also available to the Washington Metro's Orange and Silver Lines at New Carrollton, Red Line at Washington Union Station, and to the Baltimore Light RailLink at Baltimore Penn Station.

The MTA has plans to extend the Penn Line to Newark station in Delaware via a revived Elkton station to connect with the Wilmington/Newark Line of SEPTA, or even further north to 30th Street Station in Philadelphia. The Pennsylvania Railroad's commuter route had run to Philadelphia until the early 1960s.

The MTA currently funds a local bus connection between Newark and Baltimore, with a transfer at Elkton. In 2020, Delaware State Representative Edward Osienski and State Senator Stephanie Hansen cosponsored a resolution to the Delaware General Assembly that would add commuter rail service between Newark and Perryville, involving an extension of MARC service to connect with SEPTA at Newark. This resolution will be introduced into the Delaware General Assembly in 2021.

Longer-term plans include construction of new track and extending the line past Washington Union Station to L'Enfant Plaza station in Washington and from there into northern Virginia. The Purple Line light rail system (slated to open in 2027) will connect to all three MARC lines; the transfer to the Penn Line will be at New Carrollton.

== Stations ==
The following stations are served by Penn Line trains; not all trains stop at all stations.

State	Town/City	Miles (km) from Union Station	Station	Connections
DC	Washington	0.0 mi (0 km)	Union Station	Amtrak: Acela, Cardinal, Carolinian, Crescent, Floridian, Northeast Regional, Palmetto, Silver Meteor, Vermonter, Amtrak Thruway to Charlottesville; MARC: ■ Brunswick Line, ■ Camden Line; VRE: ■ Fredericksburg Line, ■ Manassas Line; Metrorail: Red Line; Metrobus, MTA Maryland, LC Transit, OmniRide; Intercity bus: Greyhound, Megabus, BoltBus, BestBus, Peter Pan, OurBus
MD	New Carrollton	8.7 mi (14 km)	New Carrollton	Amtrak: Northeast Regional, Palmetto, Vermonter; Metrorail: Orange Line, Silver Line; Metrobus, GoPGC
MD	Seabrook	11 mi (17.7 km)	Seabrook	Metrobus
MD	Bowie	16.3 mi (26.2 km)	Bowie State	
MD	Odenton	22.1 mi (35.5 km)	Odenton	Anne Arundel County Bus
MD	Hanover	29.4 mi (47.3 km)	BWI Airport	Amtrak: Acela, Crescent, Northeast Regional, Palmetto, Vermonter; Shuttle to Baltimore/Washington International Airport; MTA Maryland, UMBC Transit
MD	Halethorpe	32.4 mi (52.1 km)	Halethorpe	MTA Maryland, UMBC Transit
MD	Baltimore	37.2 mi (59.8 km)	West Baltimore	MTA Maryland
MD	Baltimore	40 mi (64.6 km)	Penn Station	Amtrak: Acela, Cardinal, Carolinian, Crescent, Northeast Regional, Palmetto, Silver Meteor, Vermonter; Baltimore Light RailLink; MTA Maryland, Charm City Circulator
MD	Middle River	51.7 mi (83.2 km)	Martin State Airport	Martin State Airport; MTA Maryland
MD	Edgewood	60.6 mi (97.5 km)	Edgewood	
MD	Aberdeen	70.2 mi (113 km)	Aberdeen	Amtrak: Northeast Regional; Harford Transit
MD	Perryville	76.2 mi (122.6 km)	Perryville	Cecil Transit
