= New Carrollton station =

Washington Metro, MARC, and Amtrak station

New Carrollton
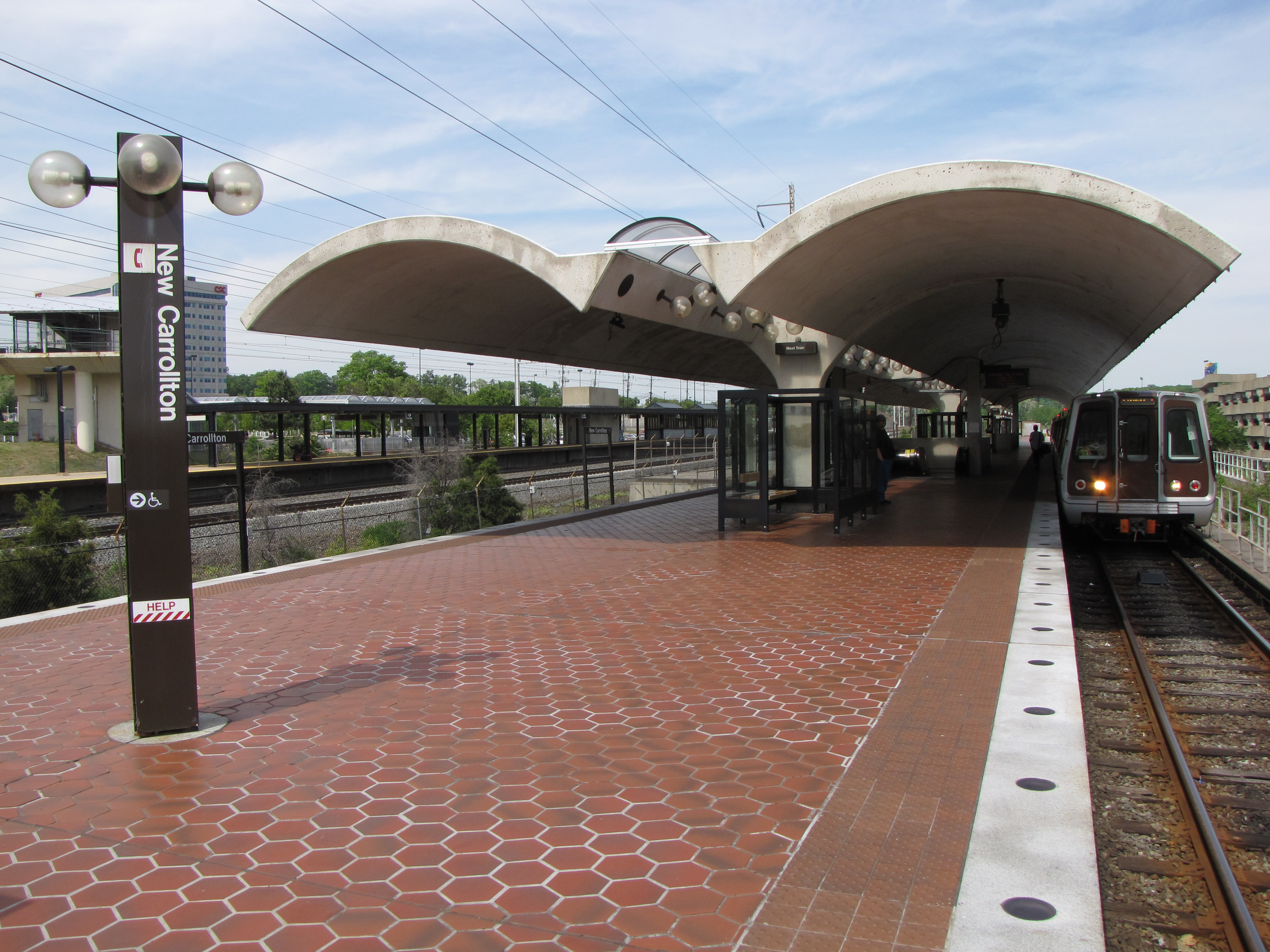
- A Metro train at the station in May 2010

General information
- Location: 4500 Garden City Drive; New Carrollton, Maryland; United States
- Coordinates: 38.9480°N 76.8719°W
- Owner: Washington Metropolitan Area Transit Authority (Metro station); Amtrak (Amtrak/MARC station); Maryland Transit Administration (Purple Line station)
- Line: Northeast Corridor
- Platforms: 2 island platforms (Metro and Northeast Corridor); 1 island platform (Purple Line – future)
- Tracks: 2 (Metro); 3 (Northeast Corridor); 2 (Purple Line – future)
- Connections: Metrobus: P20, P21, P24, P30, P31, P35, P40, P42, P60, P61; MTA Maryland Commuter Bus; GoPGC: P22, P23, P2X, P44, P52, P5X, P71; Greyhound; Peter Pan Bus Lines

Construction
- Structure type: At-grade
- Parking: 3,519 spaces
- Cycle facilities: 18 racks, 16 lockers
- Accessible: Yes

Other information
- Station code: Amtrak: NCR; Metro: D13
- IATA code: ZRZ

History
- Opened: November 20, 1978 (Metro); October 30, 1983 (Amtrak and Conrail)

Passengers
- 2025: 4,030 (average weekday) (Metro)
- Rank: 45 of 98 (Metro)
- FY 2025: 244,906 annually (Amtrak)

Services
Preceding station	Amtrak	Following station
Washington, D.C. toward Norfolk, Newport News or Roanoke	Northeast Regional	BWI Airport toward Boston South or Springfield
Washington, D.C. toward Savannah	Palmetto	BWI Airport toward New York
Washington, D.C. Terminus	Vermonter	BWI Airport toward St. Albans
Acela does not stop here
Cardinal does not stop here
Carolinian does not stop here
Crescent does not stop here
Silver Meteor does not stop here
Preceding station	MARC	Following station
Union Station Terminus	Penn Line	Seabrook toward Perryville
Preceding station	Washington Metro	Following station
Landover toward Vienna	Orange Line	Terminus
Landover toward Ashburn	Silver Line	Terminus
Former services
Preceding station	Amtrak	Following station
Washington, D.C. toward Tri-State	Hilltopper	BWI Airport toward Boston South
Preceding station	Conrail	Following station
Union Station Terminus	Baltimore-Washington Replaced by Penn Line in 1984	Seabrook toward Baltimore
Preceding station	Washington Metro	Following station
Landover toward Huntington	Blue Line	Terminus
Future services
Preceding station	Maryland Transit Administration	Following station
Glenridge toward Bethesda	Purple Line	Terminus
Route map
Location

New Carrollton station is a joint Washington Metro, MARC, and Amtrak station just outside the city limits of New Carrollton, Prince George's County, Maryland. It is the eastern terminus of the Metro Orange Line and one branch of the Silver Line. It will also be the eastern terminus of the under-construction Purple Line when it opens in late 2027. The station is adjacent to the Capital Beltway.

Beneath the Metro station platform, a waiting room serves Amtrak's Northeast Regional, Vermonter, and Palmetto trains, as well as MARC's Penn Line trains. The New Carrollton Rail Yard is nearby.

Greyhound, a nationwide intercity bus company, also stops at the station on routes serving Richmond, Washington, Philadelphia, New York City, Pittsburgh, and points beyond.

== Station layout ==
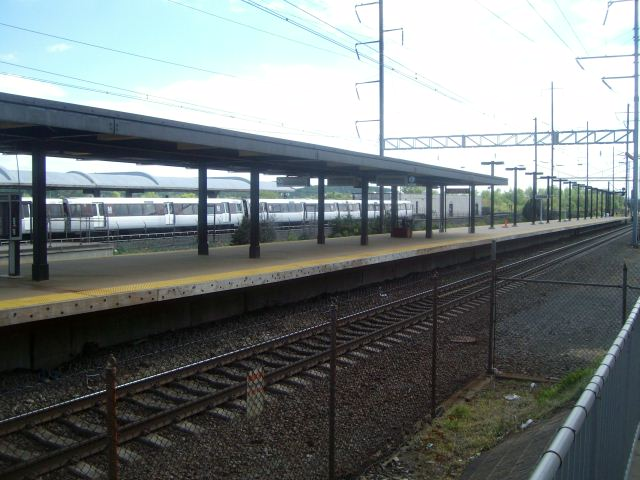
Amtrak/MARC platform

At New Carrollton, the Northeast Corridor consists of three tracks. The westernmost two tracks (Tracks 2 and 3) have an island platform between them, with Track 1 having no platform. To the east of the Amtrak platform is the Metro platform, serving the Orange and Silver Lines. Bus loops and parking lots are located on both sides of the rail line.

The station has entrances at Harkins Road and Ellin Road, and Garden City Drive near U.S. Route 50, and Exit 19 on Interstate 95/Interstate 495.

Long-term plans for the New Carrollton station include adding a second island platform (providing access to Track 1) and adding a fourth track.

== History ==
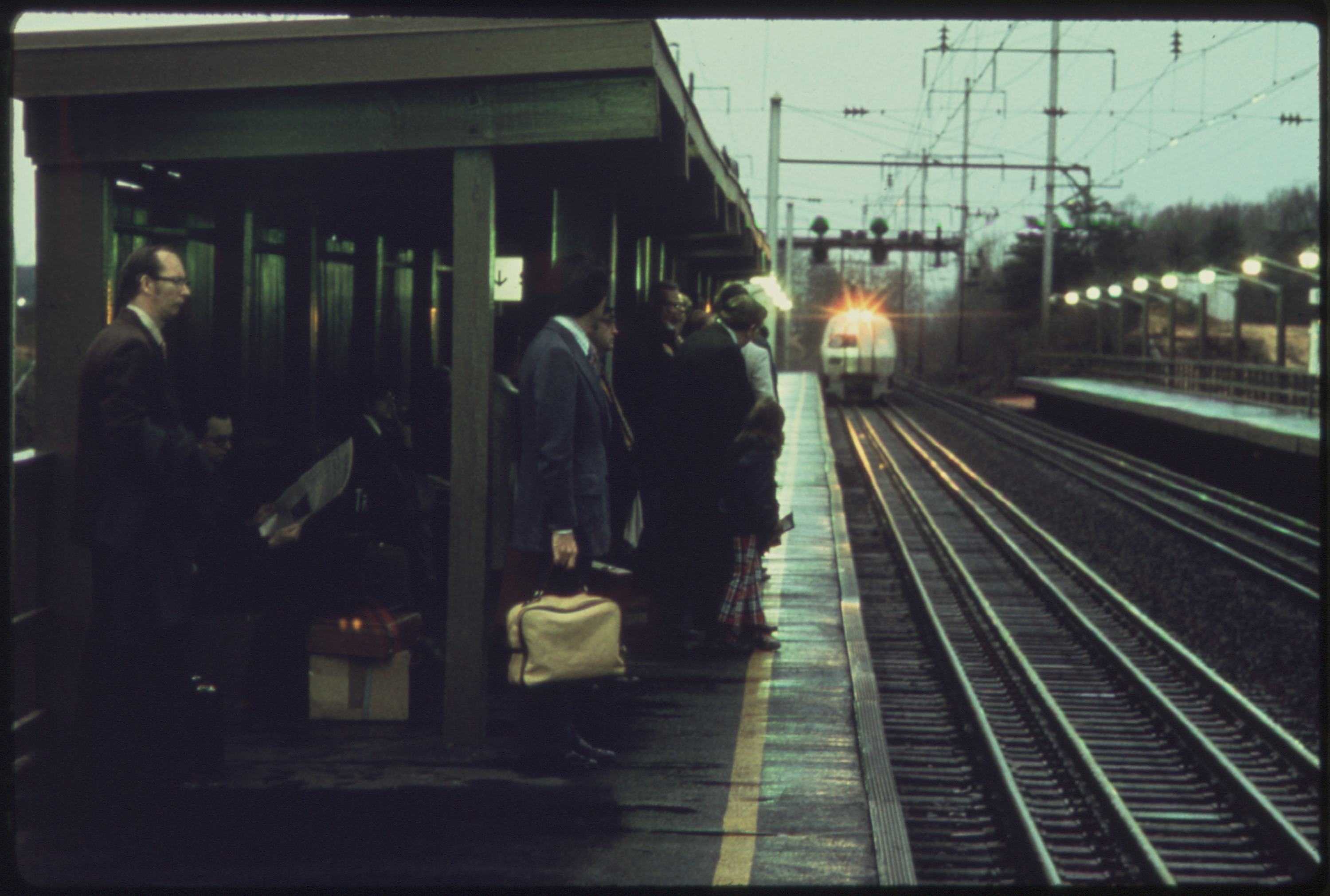
Metroliner at Capital Beltway in 1974

The New Carrollton station is the third station in the area to serve rail traffic. The first station, Lanham, 0.75 miles (1.21 km) north of the current station, opened in the 1870s. By the late 1960s, it consisted of a small shelter and an asphalt platform served by a few Penn Central (later Conrail) commuter trains between Washington and Baltimore. The second, Capital Beltway station, sat just inside the Capital Beltway. Opened on March 16, 1970, it was served by Penn Central (later Amtrak) Metroliners.

On November 20, 1978, the Washington Metro opened its New Carrollton station, along with the Cheverly, Deanwood, Landover, and Minnesota Avenue stations, marking the completion of 7.4 miles (11.9 km) of Metro track northeast from the Stadium–Armory station.

In August 1982, Conrail commuter trains (later AMDOT, then the MARC Penn Line) began stopping at Capital Beltway, replacing stops at Lanham and Landover. On October 30, 1983, Amtrak and AMDOT moved from Capital Beltway to a new island platform and waiting room at New Carrollton station.

Until 2003, some Acela Express trains stopped at New Carrollton. In October 2015, the Palmetto began stopping in New Carrollton.

The Metro station was closed from May 28, 2022 to September 5, 2022, as part of the summer Platform Improvement Project, which also affected stations north of Stadium-Armory on the Orange Line. Shuttle buses and free parking were provided at the closed stations. On September 10, 2022, Blue Line trains started serving the station due to the 14th Street bridge shutdown as a part of the Blue Plus service. The service ended on May 7, 2023 with the reopening of the Yellow Line.

Reconstruction of the existing Amtrak/MARC platform began in April 2023. An additional side platform and an expanded train hall are planned. Half of Silver Line trains began operating between Ashburn and New Carrollton on June 22, 2025. As of 2026 the Purple Line light rail line is under construction between New Carrollton and Bethesda. The line is planned to open in late 2027.
