= List of DART First State bus routes =

The following is a list and description of the bus routes of DART First State, which serves the state of Delaware. In 2025, the system had a ridership of 8,059,700, or about 32,400 per weekday as of the second quarter of 2026. Routes are divided based on their county of operation, with intercounty services running between counties.

DART First State does not operate any bus service on New Year's Day, Thanksgiving Day, and Christmas Day. A Sunday schedule is operated on Memorial Day, Independence Day, and Labor Day.

== New Castle County ==
Number	Name	Terminals		via	Service levels			Notes
Number	Name	Terminals		via	Weekday	Saturday	Sunday	Notes
2	Concord Pike	Brandywine Town Center	Wilmington Transit Center	Concord Mall; Concord Pike Shopping Centers; Talleyville; Fairfax; Christiana Care (Wilmington Hospital); Downtown Wilmington	Yes	Yes	Yes	
4	W. 4th St/Governor Printz Blvd.	Prices Corner Park & Ride	Edgemoor (Kynlyn Drive)	Barley Mill Plaza; Lancaster Avenue; West Fourth Street; Adams 4 Plaza; Downtown Wilmington; Village of Fox Point; Governor Printz Boulevard	Yes	Yes	Yes	
5	Maryland Avenue/Christiana Mall	Christiana Mall Park & Ride	Wilmington Transit Center	Delaware Tech – Stanton Campus; Christiana Care Hospital; Casino at Delaware Park; Stanton; Newport; Maryland Avenue	Yes	Yes	Yes	
6	Kirkwood Highway	Newark Transit Hub	Wilmington Transit Center	Kirkwood Highway; Prices Corner Park & Ride; Elsmere; Little Italy; Pennsylvania Avenue; Downtown Wilmington	Yes	Yes	Yes	
8	8th Street / 9th Street	Woodlawn Library	Port of Wilmington	8th Street / 9th Street; St. Francis Hospital; Downtown Wilmington; Spruce Street; Southbridge	Yes	Yes	No	
9	Boxwood Rd./Broom St./Vandever Ave.	Prices Corner Park & Ride	Howard R. Young Correctional Institution (Gander Hill)	Belvedere; Amazon (MTN1); Maryland Avenue; Broom Street; Downtown Wilmington; Vandever Avenue	Yes	Yes	Yes	
10	Wilmington/University Plaza/Newark	Rising Sun Lane	Newark Train Station	Delaware Avenue; Downtown Wilmington; Wilmington Transit Center; DuPont Highway; Basin Road; Corporate Commons (Note: Destination only served on weekday trips.); Edinburgh Drive; DE 273 & 7 Park & Ride; Christiana Town Center; University Plaza; White Clay Center; Downtown Newark; University of Delaware STAR Campus	Yes	Yes	No	
11	Washington St./Arden	Arden	Wilmington Transit Center	Harvey Road; Branmar Plaza; Webster Farms; Carrcroft; Washington Street; Christiana Care (Wilmington Hospital); Downtown Wilmington	Yes	Yes	No	
13	Philadelphia Pike/DuPont Hwy	Claymont Transportation Center	Wilton	Northtowne Plaza; Presidential Towers; Bellefonte; Market Street; Downtown Wilmington; Wilmington Transit Center; Airport Plaza; DuPont Highway	Yes	Yes	Yes	
14	Baylor/DHSS Campus/Miller Road Shopping Center	Baylor Women's Correctional Institution or Delaware Health & Social Services Campus	Miller Road Shopping Center	Dunleith; ShopRite at Christiana Crossing; Wilmington Transit Center; Windsor Apartments; Downtown Wilmington; Fox Valley Shopping Center	Yes	Yes	No	
15	New Castle Avenue/Basin Rd./Christiana Mall	Christiana Mall Park & Ride	Downtown Wilmington	Corporate Commons; Basin Road; Hope Center; Creekwood Drive; New Castle; Twin Spans Business Park; Jefferson Farms; New Castle Avenue	Yes	Yes	Yes	
18	Pike Creek Valley/Foulk Rd.	Pike Creek Valley	Foulk Road at Naamans Road	New Linden Hill Road; Limestone Road; Milltown Road; Prices Corner Park & Ride; Barley Mill Plaza; Wilmington Transit Center; Downtown Wilmington; Christiana Care (Wilmington Hospital); Fairfax; Foulkwoods; Wynnwood	Yes	No	No	
20	Lancaster Pike / Hockessin	Hockessin	Wilmington Transit Center	Lancaster Pike; Greenville; James H. Groves Adult High School; Barley Mill Plaza; Pennsylvania Avenue; Downtown Wilmington	Yes	No	No	
25	Miller Road Shopping Center/Wilmington/DuPont Highway/Wrangle Hill	Wrangle Hill Park & Ride/Delaware City DMV	Miller Road Shopping Center	New Castle County Logistics Center; Llangollen; Amazon (New Castle & Tybouts Corner); Airport Plaza; Downtown Wilmington; Christiana Care (Wilmington Hospital and Riverside Campus)	Yes	Yes	No	
28	Nemours Children's Hospital/Wilmington DMV/Probation & Parole/Riveredge Industrial Park	Nemours Children's Hospital	Riveredge Industrial Park or Wilmington DMV	Nemours Clinic; Broom Street; The Parkview Apartments; Trolley Square; St. Francis Hospital; Fourth Street; Wilmington Transit Center; Christiana Crossing; Wilmington DMV; Memorial Drive; Probation & Parole	Yes	Short turn	No	
33	Wilmington/Christiana Mall/Newark	Newark Transit Hub	Wilmington Transit Center	Newark Municipal Building; Newark Train Station; DE 896 & 4 Park & Ride; Christiana Care Hospital; Christiana Mall Park & Ride; Downtown Wilmington	Yes	Yes	Yes	
35	Brandywine Town Center/Shipley Road	Brandywine Town Center	Wilmington Transit Center	Concord Pike Shopping Centers; Shipley Manor; Talleyville; Fairfax; Christiana Care (Wilmington Hospital); Downtown Wilmington	Limited	Limited	No	Considered a limited pattern of Route 2
40	Glasgow/US Routes 13 & 40/Wilmington	Peoples Plaza Park & Ride (Glasgow)	Downtown Wilmington	Fox Run; Sparrow Run; Governors Square; Wilton; Airport Plaza; Wilmington Transit Center	Yes	Yes	Yes	
46	Newark/Glasgow/Middletown/Odessa Park & Ride	Newark Transit Hub	Odessa Park & Ride or Peoples Plaza Park & Ride (Glasgow)	Newark Train Station; DE 896 & 4 Park & Ride; Pencader Corporate Center; Peoples Plaza Park & Ride (Glasgow); North Middletown Park & Ride; Amazon (PHL 7 & PHL 9)	Yes	Yes	No	
51	New Castle Ave./DE 273/Christiana Mall	Christiana Mall Park & Ride	Downtown Wilmington	Christiana Fashion Center; Community Plaza; Airport Plaza; New Castle Farmers Market; Amazon (New Castle PHL 1); Centerpoint Business Complex; New Castle; Twin Spans Business Park; Buttonwood; New Castle Avenue	Yes	No	No	
53	Delaware City DMV/Newark Transit Hub	Wrangle Hill Park & Ride/Delaware City DMV	Newark Transit Hub	Fox Run Shopping Center; Pencader Plaza	Limited	No	No	
54	Fairplay Station/Wilton	Fairplay station	Wilton	Christiana Care Hospital; Christiana Mall Park & Ride; Christiana Fashion Center; DE 273 & 7 Park & Ride; Liberty Terrace; Springmill; Governors Square Shopping Center; Fairwinds Trailer Park	Yes	Yes	No	
55	Newark/Old Baltimore Pike/Christiana Mall	Newark Transit Hub	Christiana Mall Park & Ride	Marrows Road; South Chapel Street Industrial Parks; Old Baltimore Pike; Christiana; Christiana Fashion Center	Yes	Yes	No	
61	Naamans Road	Claymont Transportation Center	Brandywine Town Center	Northtowne Plaza; Naamans Road; F&N Shopping Center	Yes	No	No	
64	Glasgow/Governor's Square/Christiana Mall	Peoples Plaza Park & Ride (Glasgow)	Fairplay station (Note: Destination is not served on Sunday or holiday trips.)	Fox Run; Sparrow Run; Governors Square Shopping Center; DE 273 & 7 Park & Ride; Christiana Fashion Center; Christiana Mall Park & Ride; Christiana Care Hospital	Yes	Yes	Yes	
DC-2	DART Connect Newark	—N/a	—N/a	Newark; Brookside	Yes	No	No	Microtransit (see DART Connect)

== Kent County ==
Number	Name	Terminals		via	Service levels			Notes
Number	Name	Terminals		via	Weekday	Saturday	Sunday	Notes
101	Walker Road/Dover High School	Dover Transit Center	Dover High School	Silver Lake Plaza; Greentree Village; Gateway West	Yes	Yes	No	
102	Gateway West	Dover Transit Center	Gateway West Shopping Center	Modern Maturity; Easter Seals; Eden Hill Medical Center	Yes	No	No	
104	Camden Walmart	Dover Transit Center	Camden Walmart	Bayhealth Hospital; Wyoming	Yes	Yes	No	
105	Gateway South/Dover AFB	Dover Transit Center	Dover Air Force Base	Bayhealth Hospital; Eagle Meadows	Yes	Yes	No	
107	Luther Village	Dover Transit Center	Luther Village Apartments	James Williams State Service Center; Blue Hen Corporate Center	Yes	No	No	
108	East Dover	Dover Transit Center	Dover Mall	Edgehill Shopping Center; Capital Commons; North Dover Center	Yes	Yes	No	
109	Dover Mall	Dover Transit Center	US 13 near Sam's Club	Capital Commons; North Dover Center; Bally's Hotel and Casino; Dover Mall	Yes	Yes	No	
112	Delaware Tech	Dover Transit Center	Scarborough Road Park & Ride	DSU Downtown Campus; Delaware State University; Bally's Hotel and Casino; Dover Mall; Delaware Tech – Dover Campus	Yes	Yes	No	
117	Harrington / Camden	Camden Walmart	Clarks Corner Harrington	Paris Villa; Felton; Delaware State Fairgrounds	Yes	No	No	

== Sussex County ==
Number	Name	Terminals		via	Service levels			Notes
Number	Name	Terminals		via	Weekday	Saturday	Sunday	Notes
201	Red Line - Rehoboth Beach	Lewes Transit Center	Rehoboth Beach	Rehoboth Park & Ride	Yes	Yes	Summer only	
204	Yellow Line - Lewes-Cape May Lewes Ferry Terminal	Lewes Transit Center	Cape May–Lewes Ferry Terminal	The Villages of Five Points; Downtown Lewes; Lewes Beach	Yes	Yes	Summer only	Extends to Rehoboth Park & Ride during the summer
206	Green Line - Georgetown-Lewes Transit Center	Lewes Transit Center	Georgetown Transit Hub	Harbeson; Downtown Georgetown	Yes	Yes	Summer only	
208	Blue Line - Ocean City	Lewes Transit Center	Ocean City, MD (144th Street Transit Center)	Rehoboth Park & Ride; Dewey Beach; Bethany Beach; South Bethany; Fenwick Island	Summer only	Summer only	Summer only	
210	Milford Circulator	Bayhealth Sussex Campus	Milford Super Walmart	Downtown Milford	Yes	No	No	
212	Georgetown/Bridgeville/Seaford/Blades/Laurel/Delmar	Georgetown Transit Hub	Delmar	Bridgeville; Seaford; Blades; Laurel	Yes	Yes	No	
215	Purple Line - Rehoboth/Millsboro	Rehoboth Beach	Millsboro	Long Neck; Pot-Nets; Massey's Landing	Yes	Yes	Summer only	
903F	Flex - Seaford Loop	Seaford Village Shopping Center	—N/a	Downtown Seaford	Yes	No	No	
DC-1	DART Connect Georgetown-Millsboro	—N/a	—N/a	Georgetown; Millsboro	Yes	No	No	Microtransit (see DART Connect)

== Intercounty ==
Number	Name	Terminals		via	Service levels			Notes
Number	Name	Terminals		via	Weekday	Saturday	Sunday	Notes
301	Wilmington/Dover	Downtown Wilmington	Dover Transit Center	Christiana Mall Park & Ride; Boyd's Corner Park & Ride; Odessa Park & Ride; Middletown; Smyrna Park & Ride	Yes	Yes	No	
302	Middletown/Dover	North Middletown Park & Ride	Dover Transit Center	Amazon (Middletown); Townsend; Smyrna; Cheswold	Yes	Yes	No	
303	Dover/Georgetown	Georgetown Transit Hub	Dover Transit Center	Harbeson; Milton; Ellendale; Lincoln; Milford; Frederica; Magnolia	Yes	No	No	
305	Beach Connection/Magenta Line - Wilmington/Lewes	Lewes Transit Center	Wilmington Transit Center	Scarborough Road Park & Ride (Dover); Odessa Park & Ride; Christiana Mall Park & Ride	Summer holidays only (Note: Route 305 does not ordinarily run on weekdays. However, because it operates on Sundays, the route also operates on Memorial Day, Independence Day, and Labor Day.)	Summer only	Summer only	
307	Lewes Transit Center/Dover	Lewes Transit Center	Dover Transit Center	Milford; South Frederica	Yes	No	No	
