= Delaware Association of Independent Schools =

The Delaware Association of Independent Schools (DAIS) is a non-profit consortium of schools that work together to promote independent education and to support and strengthen the administrative activities of independent member schools by providing professional development, cooperative efforts, and inter-school collaboration. Members include:

- Albert EInstein Academy
- Archmere Academy
- Centreville Layton School
- The College School
- Hockessin Montessori
- The Independence School
- Padua Academy
- The Pilot School
- Salesianum School
- Sanford School
- St. Andrew's School
- St. Anne's Episcopal School
- St. Edmond's Academy
- St. Elizabeth's High School
- St. Mark's High School
- The Tatnall School
- Tower Hill School
- Ursuline Academy
- Westtown School
- Wilmington Christian School
- Wilmington Friends School
- Wilmington Montessori School
