= Cecil Transit =

Public transit system in Maryland, US

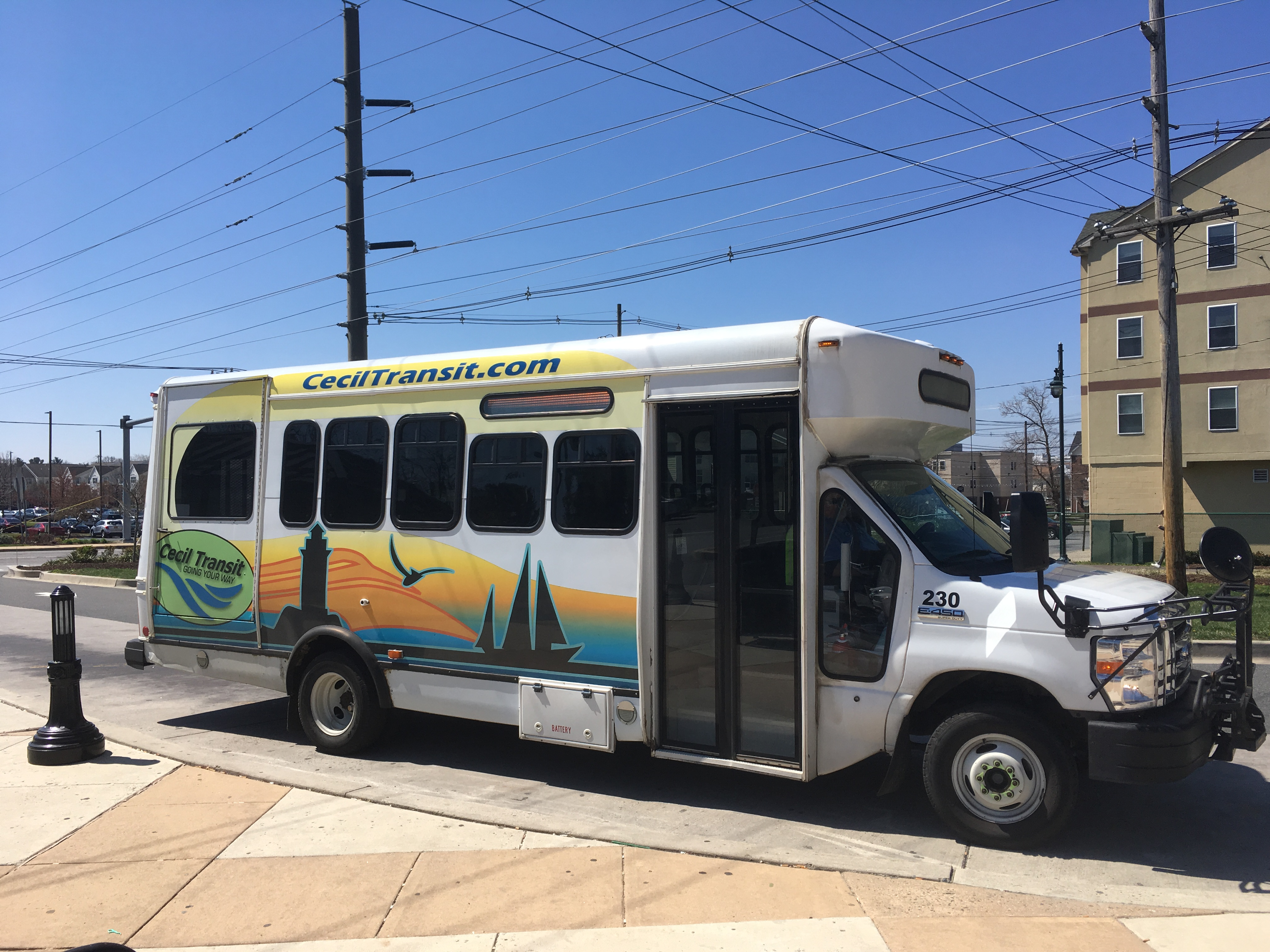
- Cecil Transit bus 230 at the Newark Transit Hub on the Route 4 line
- Parent: Cecil County
- Headquarters: 200 Chesapeake Boulevard; Elkton, MD 21921
- Service area: Cecil County, Maryland
- Service type: Bus service
- Routes: 3
- Website: ccgov.org/government/community-services/cecil-transit

Cecil Transit is a public transit agency providing bus service in Cecil County in the US state of Maryland. The agency, which is owned by Cecil County, operates fixed-route bus service along three routes serving the Cecil County towns of Elkton, North East, and Perryville along with service to Glasgow and Newark in Delaware.

Cecil Transit offers connections to Harford Transit bus service and MARC's Penn Line service in Perryville, DART First State bus service in Glasgow and Newark, and SEPTA Regional Rail's Wilmington/Newark Line service in Newark. The fixed-route service allows for deviations of up to 3/4 mile (1.2 km) through advance reservations. The agency also operates a door-to-door demand responsive transport service called Demand Response for the general public, senior citizens, and disabled people.

== History ==
Bus service between Newark and Elkton was previously operated by DART First State as Route 65. On June 30, 2014, DART First State discontinued Route 65 due to low ridership. On January 20, 2015, Cecil Transit began its Elkton Newark Connection route to provide service between Newark and Elkton. In November 2017, Cecil Transit added a Demand Response route between Cecilton and Middletown, Delaware. On May 2, 2018, Cecil Transit started the Commuter Connection, a bus route running between the Perryville MARC station and the Newark SEPTA station with an intermediate stop at Cecil College. The route is intended to bridge a gap between the two commuter rail systems, the only gap in a continuous 460 mi (740 km) chain of commuter rail systems along the Northeast Corridor from Virginia to Connecticut, while also improving access to commuter trains for Cecil County residents. The Route 5 Commuter Connection bus has been discontinued.

== Routes ==
Route	Line Name	Terminals		Places Served	Notes	Source
1	Glasgow Connection	150 East Main Street in Elkton	150 East Main Street in Elkton	Union Hospital, Maryland Route 213, Redner's, U.S. Route 40, Elkton Walmart, Chesapeake Boulevard, Kohl's, Glasgow, Peoples Plaza, U.S. Route 40, Elkton Food Lion, Acme at Big Elk Mall, Cecil County Library	operates Monday-Saturday, loop route	
2	Cross-County Connection	Acme at Big Elk Mall	Perry Point in Perryville	Cecil College-Elkton Station, Union Hospital, U.S. Route 40, North East, North East Food Lion, North East Walmart, Maryland Route 272, Cecil College, U.S. Route 40, Perryville Food Lion (westbound), Perryville MARC Station (eastbound)	operates Monday-Saturday	
4	Elkton Newark Connection	Cecil College-Elkton Station	Elkton Library	Union Hospital, Acme at Big Elk Mall, U.S. Route 40, Elkton Walmart, Chesapeake Boulevard, Glasgow, Peoples Plaza, ShopRite, Delaware Route 896, Newark Park and Ride, Newark Rail Station, Newark Transit Hub, Main Street in Newark, Elkton Road, Maryland Route 279	operates Monday-Friday, loop route	

== Demand Response ==
Cecil Transit operates a door-to-door demand responsive transport service called Demand Response for the general public, senior citizens, and disabled people, serving destinations within and outside of Cecil County. This service is available on a first-come, first-served basis through advance reservations. Among the Demand Response routes is a route running twice a month between Cecilton and Middletown, Delaware, providing residents of southern Cecil County access to shopping and healthcare in Middletown.

== Fares ==
The base cash fare for Cecil Transit fixed-route buses is $2.00, which must be paid in exact change. Senior citizens and disabled persons with a pass or Medicare card may ride the bus for $1.00. Up to two children under 46 inches (120 cm) in height may ride for free with a fare-paying adult. The fare is $4.00 for a route deviation. A bus pass offering 12 trips is available for $20.00 for regular fare or $10.00 for senior citizens and disabled persons.

The fares for Demand Response vary based on distance traveled. The service costs $5.00 for intracounty trips up to 25 miles (40 km) round trip, $10.00 for intracounty trips between 26 miles (42 km) and 50 miles (80 km) round trip, $20.00 for intracounty trips greater than 50 miles (80 km) round trip, and $40.00 for trips outside Cecil County. Senior citizens and disabled persons pay half fare for Demand Response service. The Cecilton-Middletown route costs $5.00 for the general public and $2.50 for senior citizens and disabled persons.
