= Wilmington Montessori School =

Coordinates: 39°48′12.98″N 75°28′58.11″W

Location
- 1400 Harvey Road; Wilmington, Delaware 19810; United States

Information
- Type: Nonprofit, Montessori, independent, preschool, elementary, private, daycare, middle school
- Motto: Today's Learners; Tomorrow's Leaders
- Established: 1964
- Board Chair: Paul Sakaguchi
- Head of School: Sarah Williams
- Grades: Toddler (12 months) – 8th grade
- Enrollment: 162
- Colors: Navy blue, gold and white
- Mascot: Monty the Meerkat
- Accreditation: American Montessori Society, Middle States Association of Colleges and Schools
- Contact: (302) 475-0555
- Website: wmsde.org

Wilmington Montessori School is a Montessori school located in New Castle County, Delaware, United States, serving ages 12 months through eighth grade. Its campus is partially in Ardencroft and partially in an unincorporated area. It is named after, but is not located in, Wilmington.

It is the state's oldest and largest independent Montessori school. Its facility has more than 30 classrooms, a library/learning commons, gymnasium, indoor and outdoor performance stages, music and arts rooms, three age-appropriate makerspaces, outdoor playing fields, and wooded walking paths.

The curriculum is rooted in the principles of the Montessori Method.

== History ==
In 1963, the school was initiated by a group of Delaware parents. It began as Wilmington Montessori Association with fourteen children in a storefront in downtown Wilmington, and was incorporated in January 1964. The school later moved to the Buzz Ware Village Center in Arden.

On November 14, 2008, Wilmington Montessori initiated a school-wide single-stream recycling program to help the school reduce its carbon footprint and to teach students the habit of recycling and the benefits to the Earth. The program was supplemented with a grant from Delaware's Department of Natural Resources & Environmental Control.

In 2016, Wilmington Montessori School was named a U.S. Department of Education Green Ribbon School.

In October 2017, Wilmington Montessori School announced that it would acquire PRIED Middle School and begin a middle-school program, effective in September 2018.

== Notable faculty ==
- Marie M. Dugan was the founding head of Wilmington Montessori School. She served as the Interim Executive Director of the American Montessori Society in 2004. She is the Chair of the AMS Centennial Campaign Committee and the AMS Archives Committee, and was the Keynote Committee for the Montessori Centennial Conference in 2007. She is a former President of AMS, former Accreditation Commission member and former Chair of the AMS Heads of Schools Section, having served on the Board of Directors of AMS for 13 years. She is the co-representative to the United Nations as an NGO. Dugan was the Head of the Wilmington Montessori School in Wilmington, Delaware for 25 years before retiring in 2000. She returned to WMS as interim head of school from 2012 until 2014. She is an educational consultant, serving CMTE/NY and AMS in both independent and public schools.
- In 2007, teacher Lisa Wilson-Riblett shared first place as "Teacher from a Center or Preschool" in the 9th Annual Governor's Awards for Excellence in Early Care and Education.
- In 2005, teacher Angie Meadows was one of 100 educators in the country chosen as an "Unsung Hero" by ING Financial Services.

== Accreditation ==
- American Montessori Society
- Commission on International and Trans-Regional Accreditation
- Middle States Association of Colleges and Schools

== Memberships ==
- Delaware Association of Independent Schools
- American Montessori Society
- Montessori Teachers' Association of Delaware
- National Association of Independent Schools
- Association of Delaware Valley Independent Schools
- Delaware Alliance for Non-Profit Advancement
