= Wilmington Christian School =

Location
- 825 Loveville Road; Hockessin, Delaware 19707; United States
- 39.7781°N 75.6658°W

Information
- Type: Christian college preparatory school
- Motto: ... like a tree planted by streams of water, that yields its fruit in season... Psalm 1:3
- Religious affiliation: Non-denominational Christian
- Established: 1945 (81 years ago)
- CEEB code: 080213
- Head of school: Jonathan Nazigian
- Enrollment: 432
- Student to teacher ratio: 16:1
- Campus type: Suburban
- Colors: Red, white, black
- Athletics: Soccer, volleyball, basketball, cross country, wrestling, lacrosse, track & field, field hockey
- Mascot: Warriors
- Website: wilmingtonchristian.org

Wilmington Christian School (WCS) is a private, non-denominational college preparatory Christian school. Founded in 1946 in the city of Wilmington, Delaware, it has since consolidated its elementary and secondary schools to a 15-acre (61,000 m^{2}) campus in the suburban Hockessin area and enrolls over 400 students in Pre-K3 through 12th grade.

WCS is a parent-based corporation represented by nearly 100 local churches in Delaware, Maryland, New Jersey, and Pennsylvania, with oversight provided by an elected Board of Directors. They list as their mission to provide "a Christ-centered, challenging academic program with instruction based on the Biblical view of God and the world," and encourage students to integrate biblical truth into their daily life and to impact the culture for Jesus Christ.

WCS is accredited by the Middle States Association of Colleges and Schools, and a member of the Mid-Atlantic Christian School Association (MACSA), and the Delaware Association of Independent Schools.

WCS competes in the Delaware Independent School Conference for interscholastic sports.
