= John A. H. Sweeney =

American museum curator and author (1930–2007)

- Born: May 7, 1930; Wilmington, Delaware, US
- Died: May 17, 2007 (aged 77); Wilmington, Delaware
- Resting place: St. Joseph on the Brandywine Cemetery, Wilmington, DE
- Education: Tower Hill School
- Alma mater: Yale University (BA); University of Delaware (MA)
- Occupation(s): Curator, scholar, writer
- Employer: Winterthur Museum, Garden and Library (1954–1991)

John A. H. Sweeney (May 7, 1930 – May 17, 2007) was an American curator, scholar, and writer specializing in the American decorative arts. He spent his career in curatorial and leadership positions at the Winterthur Museum, Garden and Library.

== Early life and education ==
Sweeney was born and raised in Wilmington, Delaware, where he graduated from the Tower Hill School, a private preparatory school. He received a Bachelor of Arts degree in fine arts from Yale University in 1952 and received a Master of Arts degree in 1954 from the University of Delaware, where he was a member of the first graduating class of the Winterthur Program in Early American Culture.

== Career at Winterthur ==
Beginning his career at the Winterthur Museum, Garden and Library as a curatorial assistant on August 1, 1954, Sweeney became an assistant curator in 1955, associate curator in 1956, and senior curator in 1960, serving in the latter position through 1966. He received a promotion to deputy director for collections and interpretation from 1967 to 1976 and then served as assistant to the director from 1976 until his retirement in 1991, when he received the title of curator emeritus. He continued to attend events at the museum until his death. Henry Francis du Pont mentored Sweeney and, after Jacqueline Kennedy appointed du Pont to chair the Fine Arts Advisory Committee tasked with renovating the White House's decorations and furnishings, appointed Sweeney to serve on the committee in 1961. Sweeney played an influential role in turning du Pont's personal collection of American decorative arts into one of the leading decorative arts museums in the United States. He also recommended the establishment of the Joseph Downs Manuscript Collection to honor Winterthur's founding curator, who died in 1954. He collected American redware pottery as a personal pursuit.

Sweeney was instrumental in founding the Society of Winterthur Fellows (alumni of the Winterthur Program in Early American Culture) in 1974. He served on the boards of the Decorative Arts Trust, the Victorian Society in America, the University of Delaware Library, and Rockwood Museum and Park. He served on advisory committees for the Delaware Antiques Show and the Philadelphia Antiques Show and was active in organizations such as the Friends of Winterthur and Winterthur’s Port Royal Society.

== Personal life ==
Sweeney died from leukemia complications at Christiana Hospital in Wilmington on May 17, 2007. He never married and had no children. He was survived by two brothers (Robert H. Sweeney and C. Leslie Sweeney) and seven nieces and nephews. His remains were interred at St. Joseph on the Brandywine in Greenville, Delaware.

== Publications ==
Sweeney was a scholar and author who published three books that received positive reviews in the scholarly and popular press, along with several articles and reviews.

- Sweeney, John A. H. (1964). "The Evolution of Winterthur Rooms". Winterthur Portfolio. 1: 106–120. doi:10.1086/495736. ISSN 0084-0416. JSTOR 1180468. S2CID 162285855.
- Sweeney, John A. H. (1963). The Treasure House of Early American Rooms. Viking Press. ISBN 9780393016017. OCLC 1321828.
- Sweeney, John A. H. (1963). Winterthur Illustrated. Henry Francis du Pont Winterthur Museum. OCLC 228670634.
- Sweeney, John A. H. (1959). Grandeur on the Appoquinimink: The House of William Corbit at Odessa, Delaware. University of Delaware Press. OCLC 2922369.
