= Newark Transit Hub =

Bus terminal in Newark in New Castle County, Delaware

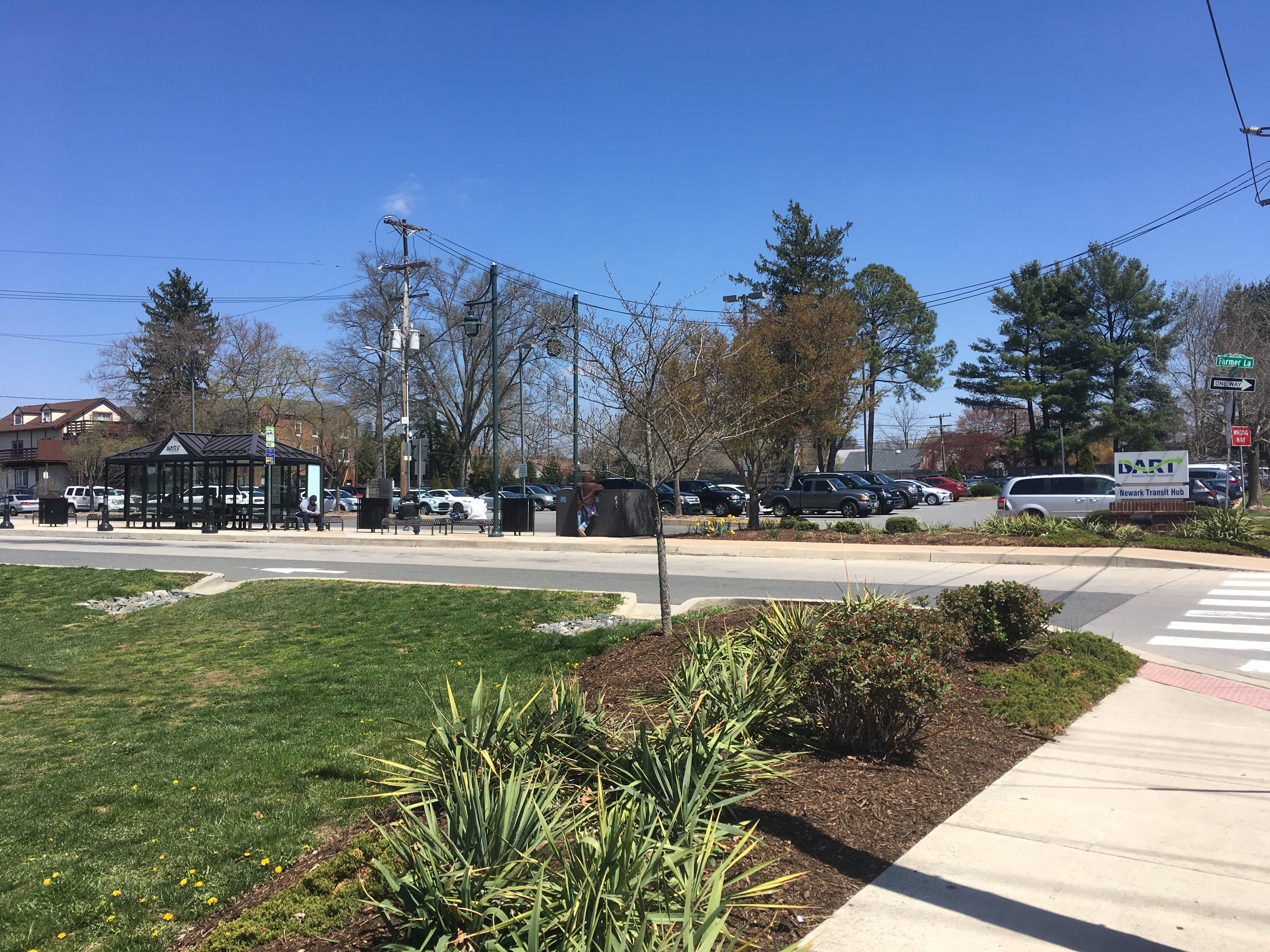
- Newark Transit Hub

General information
- Location: East Delaware Avenue; Newark, DE 19711
- Coordinates: 39.6824813°N 75.7435°W
- System: DART First State bus terminal
- Bus routes: 6
- Bus operators: DART First State; Cecil Transit

Construction
- Cycle facilities: Bicycle racks
- Accessible: yes

History
- Opened: June 2008
Location

The Newark Transit Hub is a bus terminal located in the city of Newark in New Castle County, Delaware. The transit hub serves DART First State buses, with service provided by five local bus routes serving New Castle County. In addition to DART First State buses, the Newark Transit Hub also serves Cecil Transit buses providing service to Elkton, Maryland. The transit hub opened in 2008.

== Location and layout ==
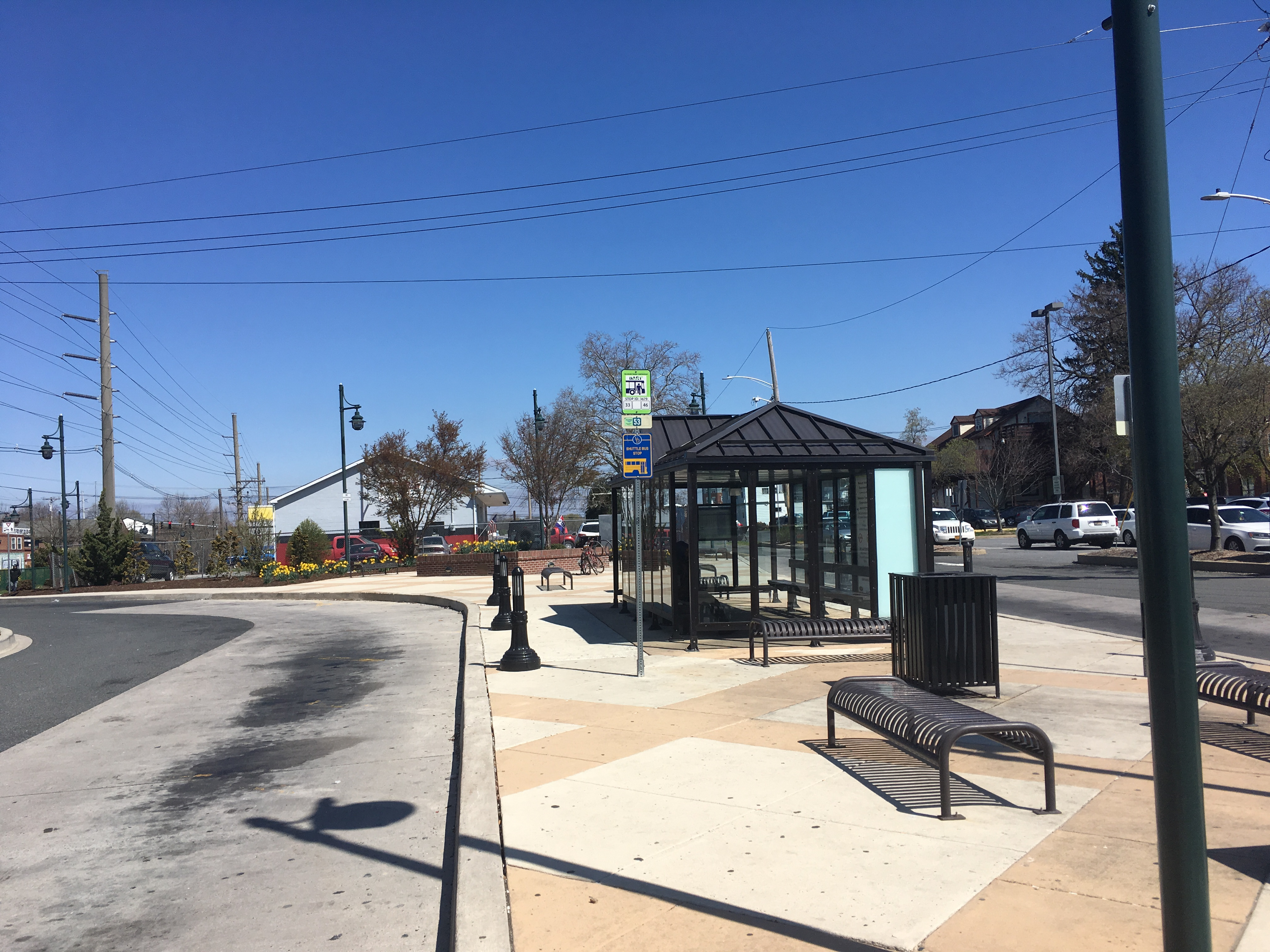
Bus shelter at Newark Transit Hub

The Newark Transit Hub is located in the eastern part of the city of Newark in northern New Castle County, Delaware a short distance east the downtown area and the University of Delaware campus. The bus terminal is situated north of East Delaware Avenue, which carries eastbound Delaware Route 273, and south of East Main Street, which carries westbound Delaware Route 273. The Pomeroy and Newark Rail Trail passes north–south to the west of the transit hub. The transit hub is located on the north side of East Delaware Avenue and consists of a bus shelter with benches and trash cans on the sidewalk adjacent to the roadways serving the buses. The Newark Transit Hub also has bicycle racks available. Two roads serve the bus terminal, with northbound Pomeroy Lane running along the west side and southbound Farmer Lane running along the east side.

== History ==
Prior to the construction of the Newark Transit Hub, DART First State buses serving Newark made several stops along the streets of downtown Newark, contributing to traffic congestion. As a result, the Newark Transit Hub was planned in order to consolidate the bus stops into a centralized location to allow for easier transfers and to reduce congestion along streets. On March 24, 2008, construction began on the Newark Transit Hub. Construction of the transit hub cost $1.2 million and was funded 80 percent by the federal government and 20 percent by the state government. DART First State buses began serving the Newark Transit Hub in June 2008, with the routing of several bus routes modified as a result of the bus terminal opening. A formal opening ceremony for the Newark Transit Hub was held on August 21, 2008, with Delaware Department of Transportation secretary Carolann Wicks, Newark Mayor Vance A. Funk III, State Senator Liane Sorenson, State Representatives John Kowalko and Terry Schooley, and Newark City Council member Doug Tuttle in attendance.

== Services ==
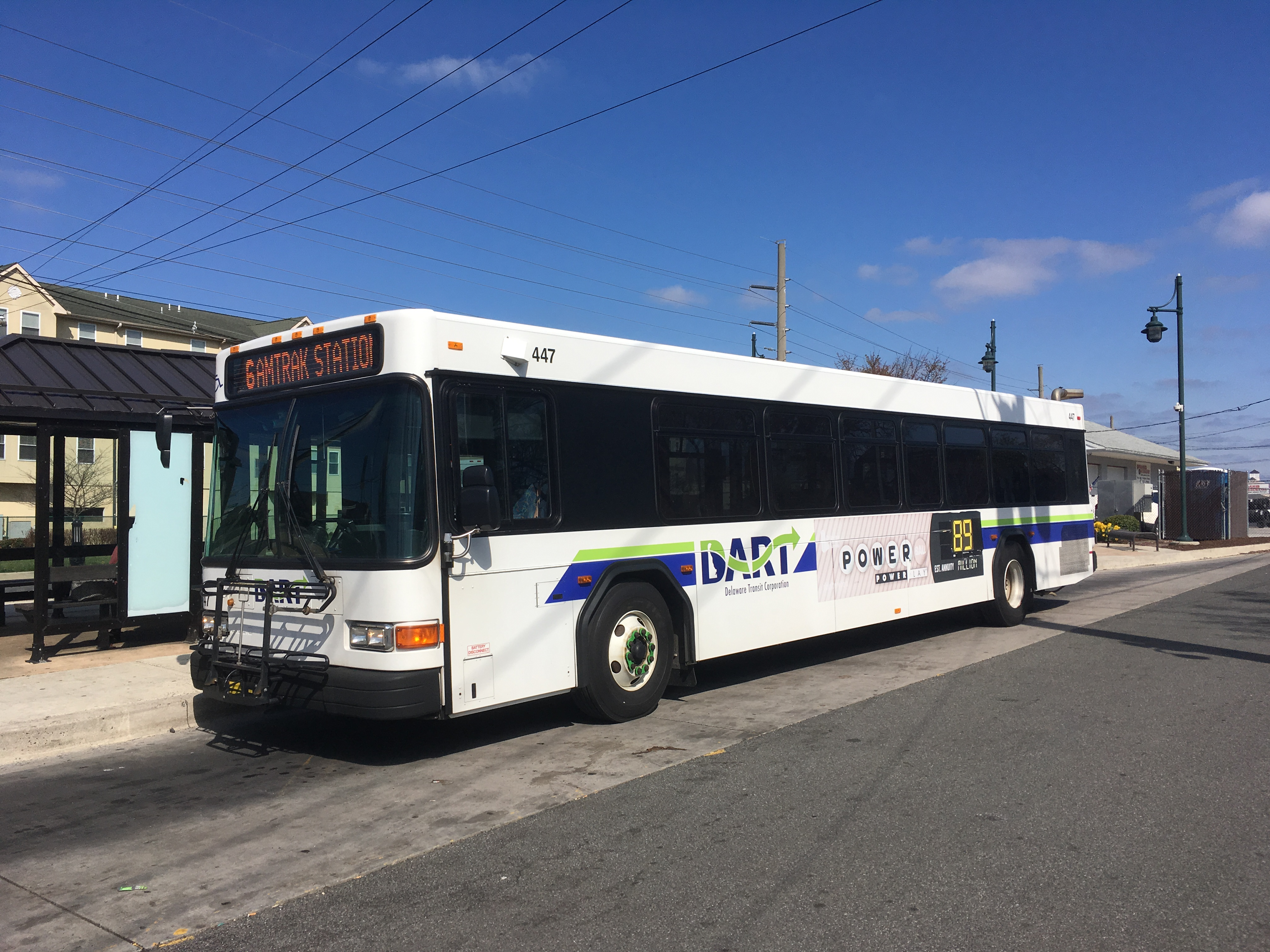
DART First State bus 447 at the Newark Transit Hub on the Route 6 line

There are five local bus routes operated by DART First State that connect the Newark Transit Hub to points in New Castle County. The Route 6 bus connects the transit hub to the Wilmington train station in Wilmington via Delaware Route 2. The Route 33 bus connects the transit hub with the Christiana Mall and downtown Wilmington. The Route 46 bus connects the transit hub to Glasgow and Middletown. The Route 53 bus connects the Newark Transit Hub to the DMV in Delaware City. The Route 55 bus links the transit hub with the Christiana Mall via Old Baltimore Pike. Cecil Transit's Route 4, which runs along a loop route providing service to and from Elkton, Maryland, also serves the Newark Transit Hub.
