= Christiana Mall Park & Ride =

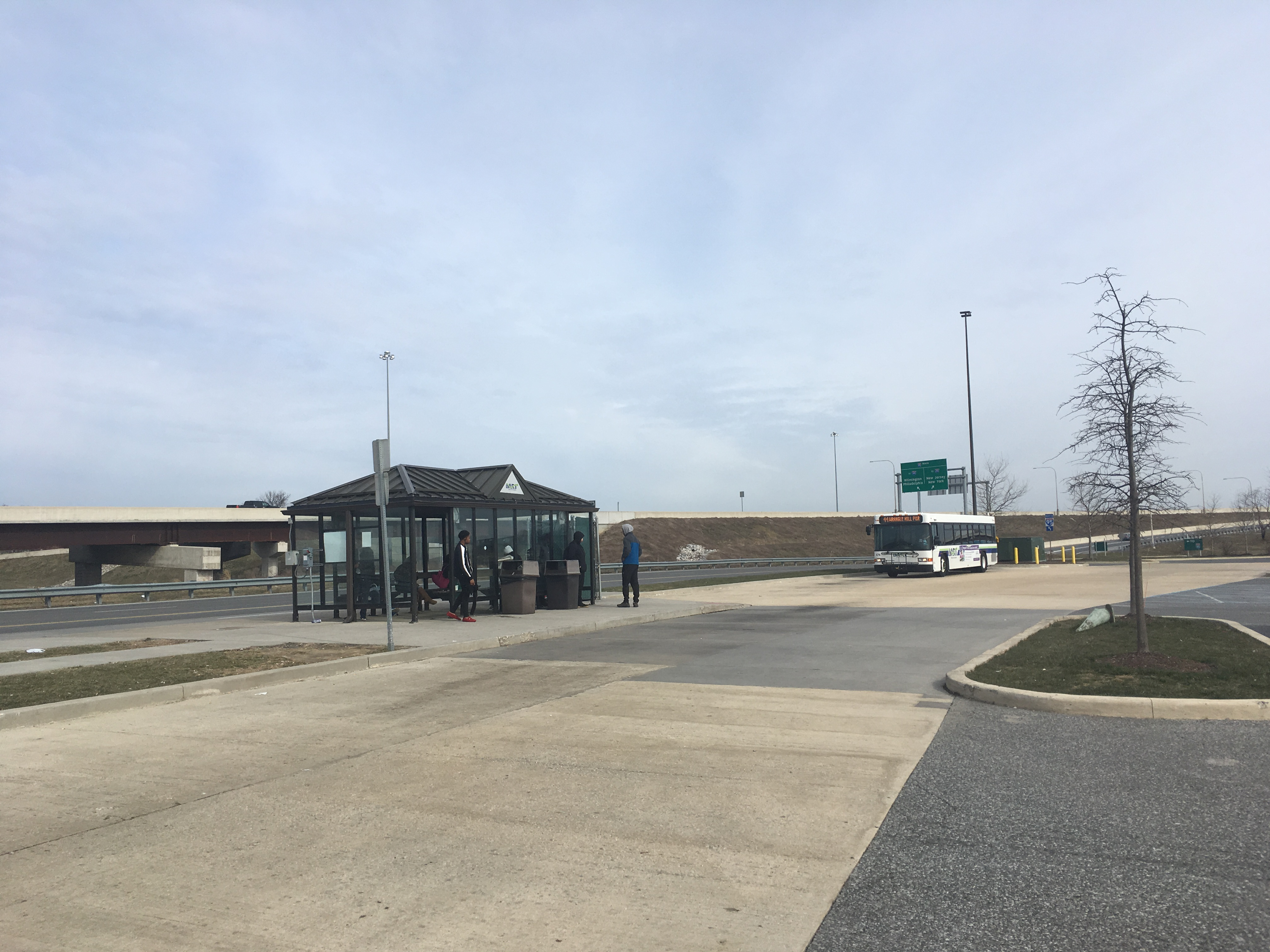
- Bus shelter at Christiana Mall Park & Ride

General information
- Location: Christiana Mall; Newark, DE 19702
- Coordinates: 39.680°N 75.6558°W
- System: DART First State bus terminal
- Bus routes: 8
- Bus operators: DART First State

Construction
- Accessible: yes
Location

The Christiana Mall Park & Ride is a park and ride lot and bus terminal located at the Christiana Mall in the unincorporated community of Christiana between Wilmington and Newark in New Castle County, Delaware. The park and ride serves DART First State buses, with service provided by 6 local bus routes serving New Castle County and two inter-county bus routes that provide service to Dover and seasonal service to Lewes.

== Location and layout ==
The Christiana Mall Park & Ride is located at the Christiana Mall, a shopping mall located southeast of the interchange between Interstate 95 and Delaware Route 1/Delaware Route 7 in the unincorporated community of Christiana, situated between Wilmington and Newark in northern New Castle County, Delaware. The park and ride is located in the parking lot of the mall on the west side near Nordstrom. The Christiana Mall Park & Ride consists of a bus shelter with benches, bus schedules, and trash cans adjacent to the roadway. A sidewalk connects the park and ride to the mall entrance near Nordstrom. The parking spaces for the park and ride are located in the mall's parking lot, with yellow paint used to delineate the park and ride area.

== History ==
The Christiana Mall Park & Ride was originally located along the mall's ring road to the north of the mall, where Cabela's is currently located. On July 21, 2013, the park and ride was relocated to its current location to the west of Nordstrom.

== Services ==
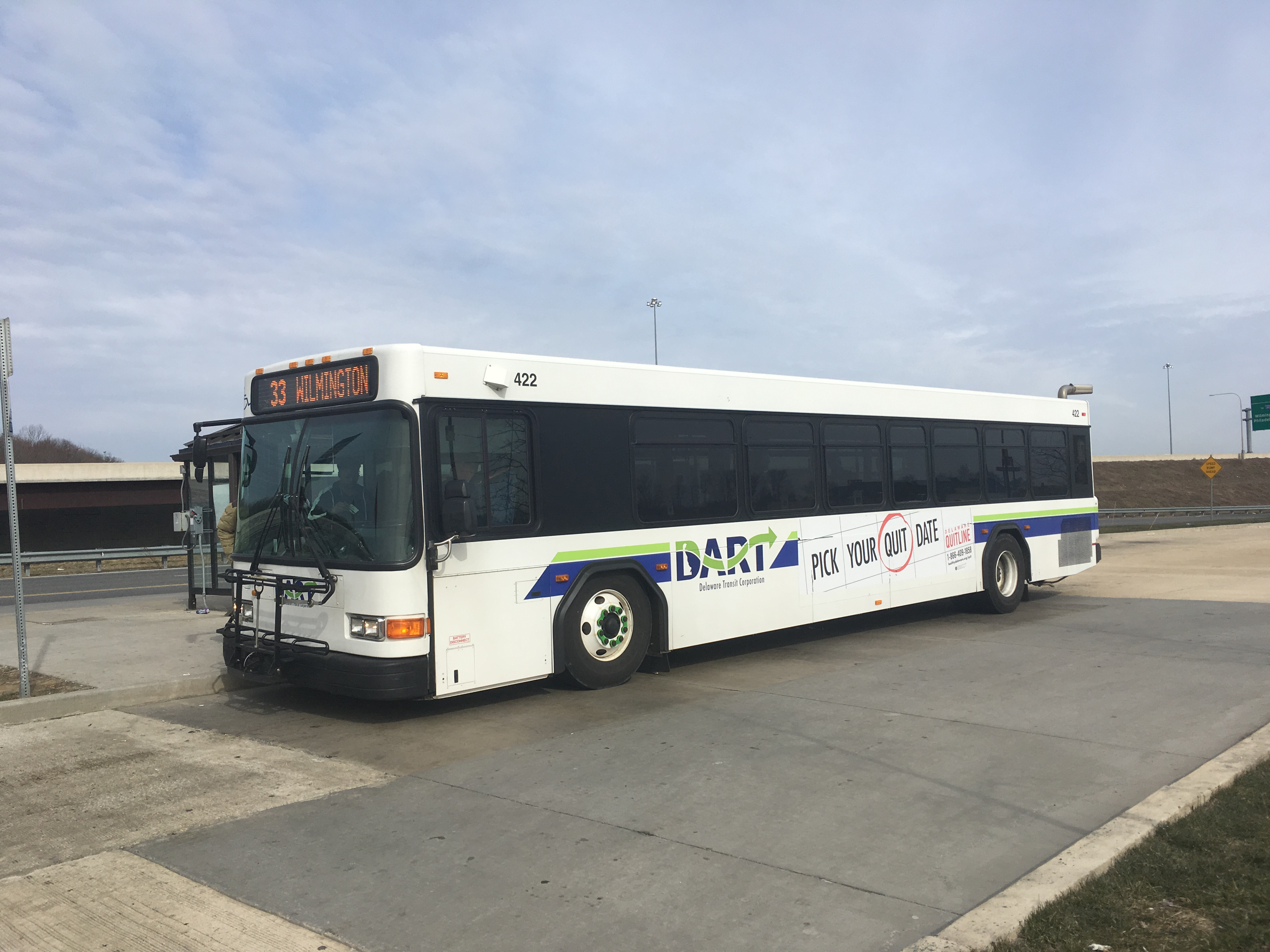
DART First State bus 422 at the Christiana Mall Park & Ride on the Route 33 line

Six local bus routes connect the Christiana Mall Park & Ride to points in New Castle County. The Route 5 bus connects the park and ride to Delaware Park Racetrack, Stanton, Newport, and downtown Wilmington. The Route 15 bus connects the Christiana Mall Park & Ride to New Castle and downtown Wilmington. The Route 33 bus connects the park and ride with the downtown areas of Wilmington and Newark. The Route 51 bus connects the Christiana Mall Park & Ride to New Castle and downtown Wilmington. The Route 55 bus links the Christiana Mall Park & Ride with downtown Newark via Old Baltimore Pike. The Route 64 bus connects the park and ride to Churchmans Crossing station, Bear, and Glasgow. Two inter-county bus routes stop at Christiana Mall Park & Ride along their routes between Wilmington and points in southern Delaware. The Route 301 bus provides service from the Christiana Mall to Dover while the Route 305 "Beach Connection" bus provides seasonal weekend and holiday service in the summer months to Lewes. The Christiana Mall also has a bus stop near Target that serves Routes 5, 15, and 51.
