= Delaware Independent School Conference =

The Delaware Independent School Conference (DISC) is a high-school athletic conference, whose members are private schools located primarily in Delaware.

Its members include:

- Sanford School
- St. Andrew's School
- The Tatnall School
- Tower Hill School
- Wilmington Christian School (joined in 2017)
- Wilmington Friends School

Pennsylvania's Westtown School was a member of the DISC from 1968 until 2015.
