= Lewes Transit Center =

Bus terminal in Delaware, United States

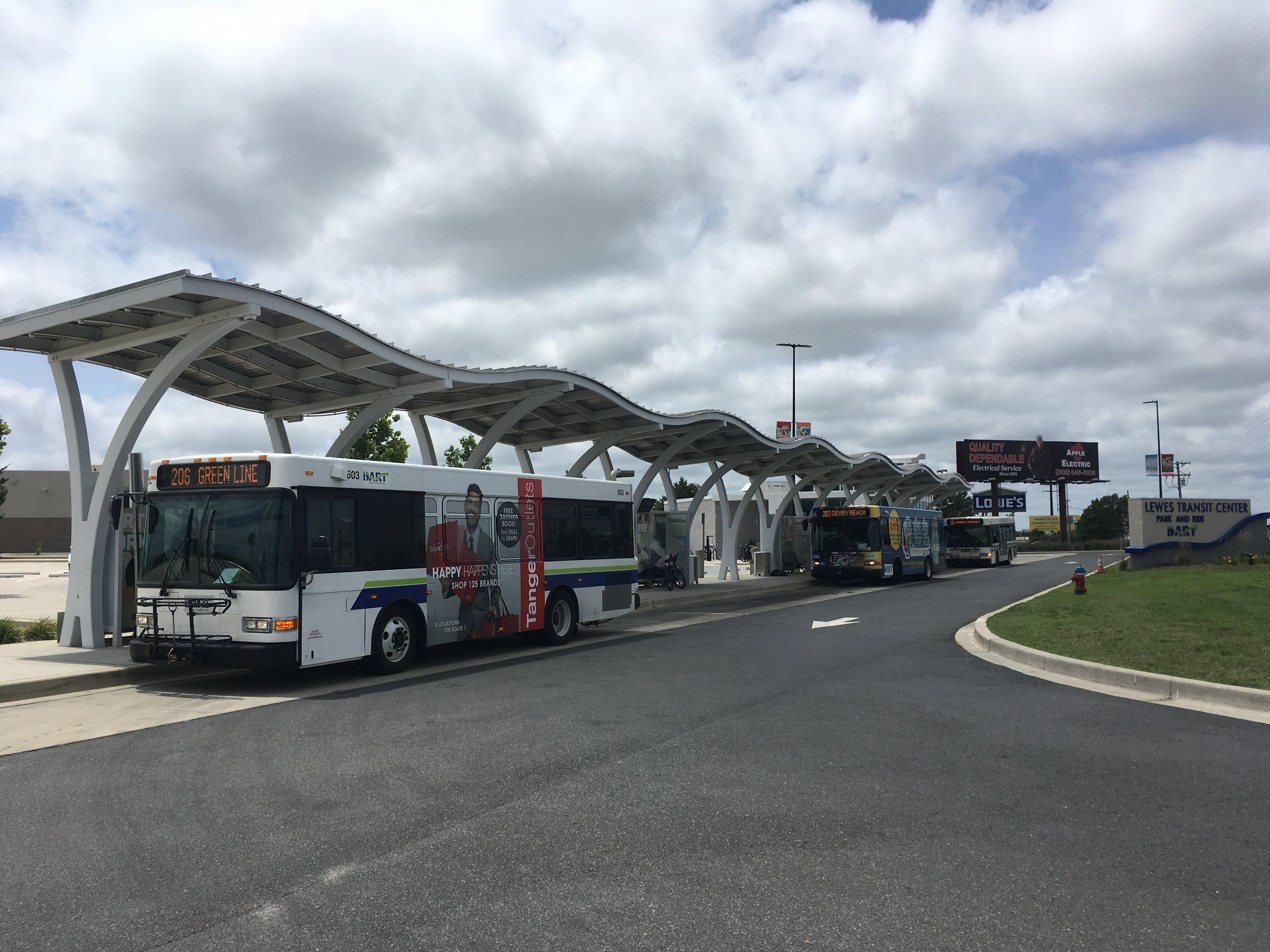
- Lewes Transit Center

General information
- Location: 17616 Coastal Highway; Lewes, DE 19958
- Coordinates: 38.7476953°N 75.1695°W
- System: DART First State bus terminal
- Bus routes: 6
- Bus operators: DART First State

Construction
- Parking: 248 spaces
- Cycle facilities: Bicycle racks
- Accessible: yes

History
- Opened: May 6, 2017
Location

The Lewes Transit Center is a park and ride lot and bus terminal owned by the Delaware Department of Transportation (DelDOT) that is located near the Five Points intersection southwest of the city of Lewes in Sussex County, Delaware. The transit center serves DART First State buses, with service provided by four local bus routes, three of which operate year-round, with expanded service during the summer months, and one of which operates seasonally during the summer months, serving Sussex County and the Delaware Beaches. The bus terminal also serves two inter-county bus routes that provide year-round service to Dover and summer weekend and holiday service from Wilmington. The Lewes Transit Center opened in 2017.

== Location and layout ==
The Lewes Transit Center is located southwest of the city of Lewes in Sussex County, Delaware. The transit center is located along the south side of U.S. Route 9/Delaware Route 1 (Coastal Highway) a short distance east of the Five Points intersection, with access from the southbound lanes. The park and ride is located at the northern edge of the Delaware Beaches region, allowing for transfer to bus services before motorists reach heavier traffic along DE 1 approaching Rehoboth Beach. Buses utilize bus lanes along DE 1 between the Lewes Transit Center and Rehoboth Beach, bypassing traffic congestion. The Lewes Transit Center features a bus loop that buses pull into, to pick up and drop off passengers. Located south of the bus stop is a park and ride lot with 248 parking spaces along with an indoor passenger facility featuring seating, restrooms, a ticket sales office, and monitors displaying real-time bus information. Other amenities at the Lewes Transit Center include bicycle racks, benches that feature solar-powered charging stations, and an electric vehicle charging station.

== History ==
On June 11, 2012, a public workshop was held on constructing a park and ride lot and a bus maintenance facility in Lewes. A groundbreaking ceremony for the Lewes Transit Center was held on March 9, 2016, with Governor Jack Markell, DelDOT secretary Jennifer Cohan, and DART First State CEO John Sisson in attendance. The first phase of the transit center constructed a park and ride lot and bus stop. Construction of the transit center cost $16.5 million. A total of 80 percent of the funding came from the Federal Transit Administration, which included a $5 million State of Good Repair grant, while the remaining 20 percent came from the Delaware Transportation Trust Fund. On May 6, 2017, DART First State began bus service to the Lewes Transit Center. A formal ribbon-cutting ceremony for the transit center was held on May 12, 2017, with U.S. Representative Lisa Blunt Rochester, DelDOT secretary Cohan, and DART First State CEO Sisson in attendance. By November 2017, construction was underway on the second phase of the Lewes Transit Center, which will build permanent structures for the facility including a 170 ft (52 m) canopy for passengers with digital signs displaying bus information and a visitor center. The passenger canopy was completed by May 2018 while the visitor center was finished by mid-summer 2018. The third phase of the Lewes Transit Center will build a bus maintenance facility which will allow for more year-round bus service in eastern Sussex County that will start in 2018. On May 21, 2018, a groundbreaking ceremony for the bus maintenance facility was held, with DelDOT secretary Cohan, DART First State CEO Sisson, and State Tourism Director Elizabeth Keller in attendance. On May 20, 2019, an indoor passenger facility opened at the Lewes Transit Center featuring seating, restrooms, a ticket sales office, and monitors displaying real-time bus information.

== Services ==
There are four local bus routes that connect the Lewes Transit Center to the Delaware Beaches and Sussex County. Three of the local routes operate year-round, with expanded service from May to September as part of DART First State's Beach Bus service, while the fourth local route operates seasonally from May to September as part of the Beach Bus service. The Route 201 bus provides year-round service from the Lewes Transit Center to the Tanger Outlets and the boardwalk in Rehoboth Beach. The Route 204 bus provides year-round service from the Lewes Transit Center to Lewes and the Cape May–Lewes Ferry terminal and south to Rehoboth Beach. The Route 206 bus operates year-round, providing service from the transit center to Georgetown. The Route 208 bus operates seasonally from the transit center to Rehoboth Beach, Dewey Beach, Bethany Beach, Fenwick Island, and Ocean City, Maryland. There are also two inter-county bus routes that provides service to the Lewes Transit Center from other parts of Delaware. The Route 305 "Beach Connection" provides seasonal service on weekends and holidays from May to September to the transit center from Wilmington, the Christiana Mall, Middletown, and Dover. The Route 307 bus provides year-round service from the Lewes Transit Center to Milford and Dover.
