= Dunleith, Delaware =

Unincorporated community in Delaware, United States

- Unincorporated community
- Location within Delaware Location within the United States
- Coordinates: 39°42′31″N 75°33′20″W
- Country: United States
- State: Delaware
- County: New Castle
- Elevation: 56 ft (17 m)
- Time zone: UTC-5 (Eastern (EST))
  - Summer (DST): UTC-4 (EDT)
- Area code: 302
- GNIS feature ID: 213916

Dunleith is a suburb of Wilmington, in New Castle County, Delaware, United States. It was built in the early 1950s, and was the first housing development marketed for African-Americans in Delaware. In 1990, the population was 2,600.

== Geography ==
Dunleith is located at 39°42′31″N 75°33′20″W (39.708724, -75.555479). It is two miles (3.2 km) south of Wilmington and the Delaware Memorial Bridge is two miles (3.2 km) SE.

== History ==
The community was named after the Rogers and Du Pont family's estate, "Dunleith Mansion". In 1949 (Housing Act of 1949), Delaware Community Homes bought the approximately 85 acres (340,000 m^{2}), and the homes were constructed by housing developer Leon Weiner. Many World War II veterans, blue-collar workers, and teachers became homeowners for the first time. The streets were named after prominent African-Americans such as Jackie Robinson, Ralph Bunche and George Washington Carver. Subsequently, two churches were built; Coleman Memorial Methodist Church on Anderson Drive and Community Presbyterian Church on Rogers Road. The Dunleith Community School was founded in 1956.

== Gallery ==
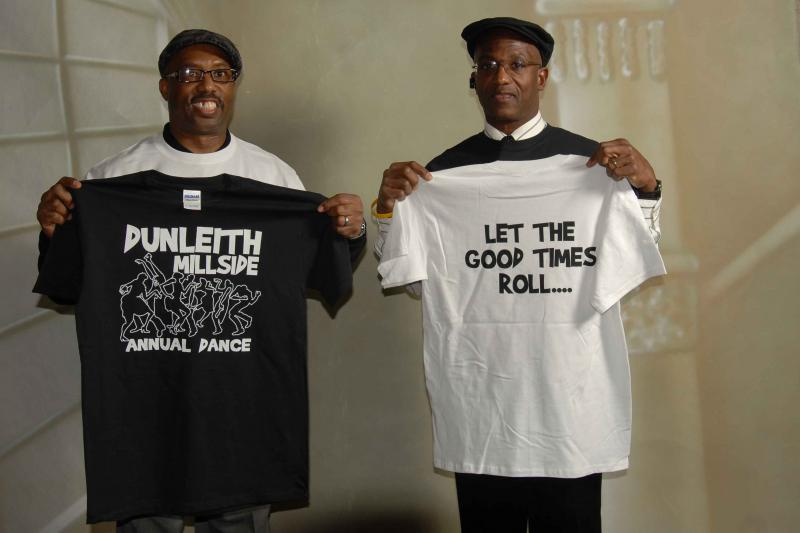
Tee shirts created for Homecoming Festival created by H&M Teez

== Sources ==
- WDEL 1150AM - Historical marker to be unveiled in Dunleith
- Maurice Howard/ Freelance Photographer - Around Delaware
- "Preservationists work to recognize subdivisions built for blacks", International Herald Tribune, Associated Press (February 13, 2008).
