= Dover Transit Center =

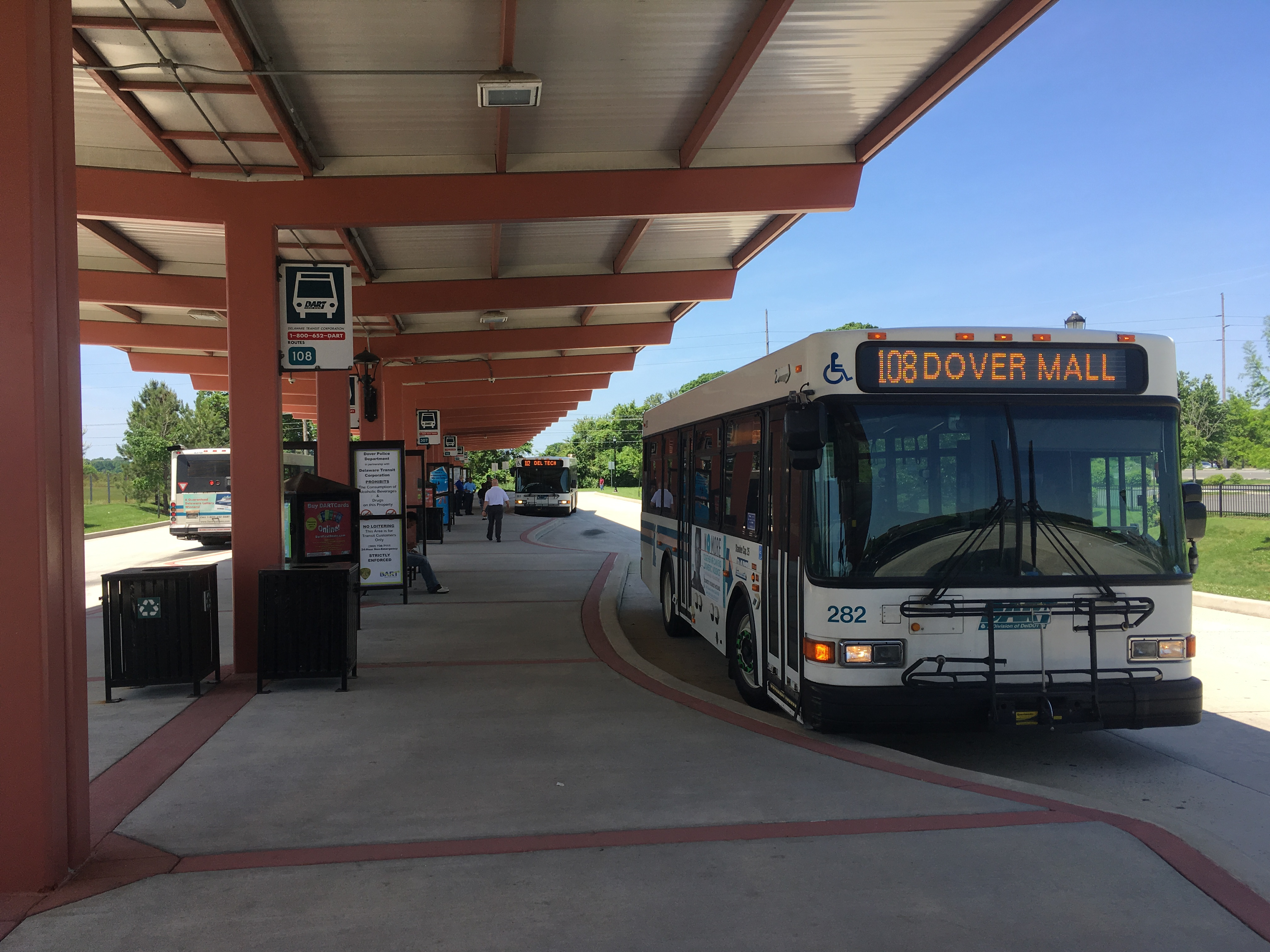
- Dover Transit Center

General information
- Location: 468 West Water Street; Dover, DE 19901
- Coordinates: 39.1526361°N 75.529°W
- System: DART First State bus terminal
- Bus routes: 11
- Bus stands: 14
- Bus operators: DART First State

Construction
- Accessible: yes

History
- Opened: December 13, 2010
Location

The Dover Transit Center is a park and ride lot and bus terminal located in the city of Dover in Kent County, Delaware. The transit center serves DART First State buses, with service provided by eight local bus routes serving Dover and Kent County and four inter-county bus routes that provide service to Wilmington, Newark, Georgetown, and Lewes. The Dover Transit Center opened in 2010 to replace the Water Street Transfer Center as the main bus terminal for DART First State in Dover.

== Location and layout ==
The Dover Transit Center is located south of the downtown area of the city of Dover in Kent County, Delaware. The transit center is located along the south side of West Water Street between South West Street and South Queen Street. The Dover Transit Center features two bus loops that buses pull into to pick up and drop off passengers; the bus loops can accommodate a total of 14 buses. One bus loop heads east from South West Street and serves the north side of the passenger waiting area before turning north to West Water Street while the other bus loop heads west from South Queen Street to South West Street to serve the south side of the passenger waiting area. The passenger waiting area is located between the bus loops and features a canopy to protect passengers from the elements, bus schedules, monitors displaying real-time bus information, benches, and trash cans. A park and ride lot is located north of the bus stop, with access to the lot from West Water Street.

== History ==
Before the Dover Transit Center was built, the main bus terminal for DART First State buses in Dover was the Water Street Transfer Center, a small bus terminal located along West Water Street between South Governors Avenue and South State Street. The Delaware Department of Transportation made plans to replace the Water Street Transfer Center by constructing the Dover Transit Center, a larger bus terminal that could accommodate more buses and lead to the expansion of bus service in the Dover area. The location of the new transit center near a railroad line also makes it possible to serve as a train station should a project bring passenger rail service to Dover in the future. The transit center was proposed to be built on a site formerly belonging to George & Lynch. The first phase of the Dover Transit Center, which included the bus loops, shelters, and park and ride lot, received $5.7 million in funding from the American Recovery and Reinvestment Act of 2009. A construction contract of $4.46 million to build the first phase of the transit center was awarded to Richard E. Pierson Construction Co. on November 20, 2009. Construction on the Dover Transit Center began on the week of May 31, 2010. DART First State began bus service to the Dover Transit Center on December 13, 2010, relocating from the Water Street Transfer Center. The transit center site allows for construction of a 30,000-square-foot (2,800 m^{2}) office building in the future.

== Services ==
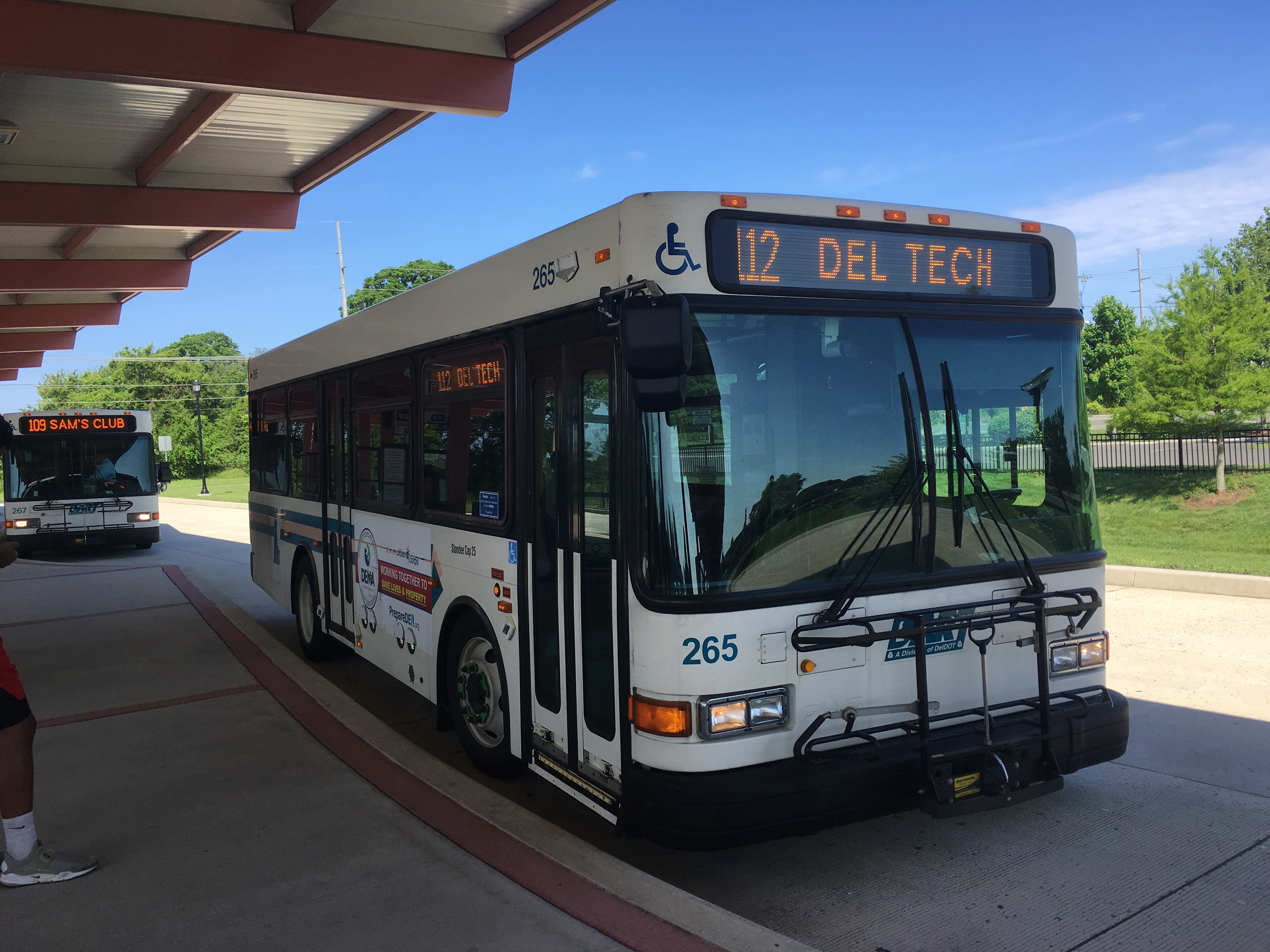
DART First State bus 265 at the Dover Transit Center on the Route 112 line

There are seven local bus routes that connect the Dover Transit Center to points in Dover and Kent County. The Route 101 bus runs from the transit center via Walker Road to Dover High School, the Greentree Village Shopping Center, and the Gateway West Shopping Center in West Dover. The Route 104 bus runs from the Dover Transit Center south to Rodney Village and Camden, where it ends at the Walmart in Camden. The Route 105 bus runs from the transit center south via South State Street to the Moores Lake Shopping Center, Gateway South Shopping Center, and Dover Air Force Base. The Route 107 bus operates from the bus terminal to the State Capitol Complex, the Blue Hen Corporate Center, and Luther Village. The Route 108 bus runs from the Dover Transit Center to Towne Point and the Dover Mall. The Route 109 bus runs from the transit center to the Dover Mall and the Sam's Club in North Dover. The Route 112 bus operates from the bus terminal via West Dover to Delaware Technical Community College and the Scarborough Road Park & Ride. There are also four inter-county bus routes that run from the Dover Transit Center to other parts of Delaware. The Route 301 bus runs from the Dover Transit Center north to Wilmington. The Route 302 bus operates from the transit center north to Middletown. The Route 303 bus runs from the bus terminal south to Georgetown via Milford and Milton. The Route 307 operates from the Dover Transit Center to Lewes via Milford.
