= Webster Farm, Delaware =

Unincorporated community in Delaware, United States

- Unincorporated community
- Location within Delaware Location within the United States
- Coordinates: 39°47′40″N 75°30′39″W
- Country: United States
- State: Delaware
- County: New Castle
- Elevation: 276 ft (84 m)
- Time zone: UTC-5 (Eastern (EST))
  - Summer (DST): UTC-4 (EDT)
- Area code: 302
- GNIS feature ID: 217109

Webster Farm is an unincorporated housing development in New Castle County, Delaware, United States. It was founded in 1958 and consists of 117 houses.

== Location ==
Webster Farm is located southwest of the intersection of Delaware Route 3 and Wilson Road northeast of Wilmington. Entrances to the community are on Wilson and Marsh Road. It is bordered by Mayfield and Lynnfield.

== History ==
Originally an apple orchard, Webster Farm was first built in 1958 by the Malin & Skura company, owned by Joseph J. Malin and his son-in-law, Gabriel Santillo. 100 homes were originally planned, and the first houses opened to the public on October 26, 1958. The Journal–Every Evening reported, "The first three of more than 100 new custom grade homes will be opened for inspection tomorrow at Webster Farm on Marsh Road, Brandywine Hundred. Built by Malin & Skura, the homes are of the traditional Colonial Revival style, story and a half and two-story type."

The first homes, titled "The Webster", opened between 1958 and 1960. Their civic association was formed in 1960. The 38th house, a Cape Cod, was completed in 1961. By the fourth year of development about 40 homes were completed, out of an expanded plan of 115. The community was completed a few years later and consisted of 117 houses.
