= DART First State =

Delaware's public transport system operator

DART First State (Delaware Transit Corporation)

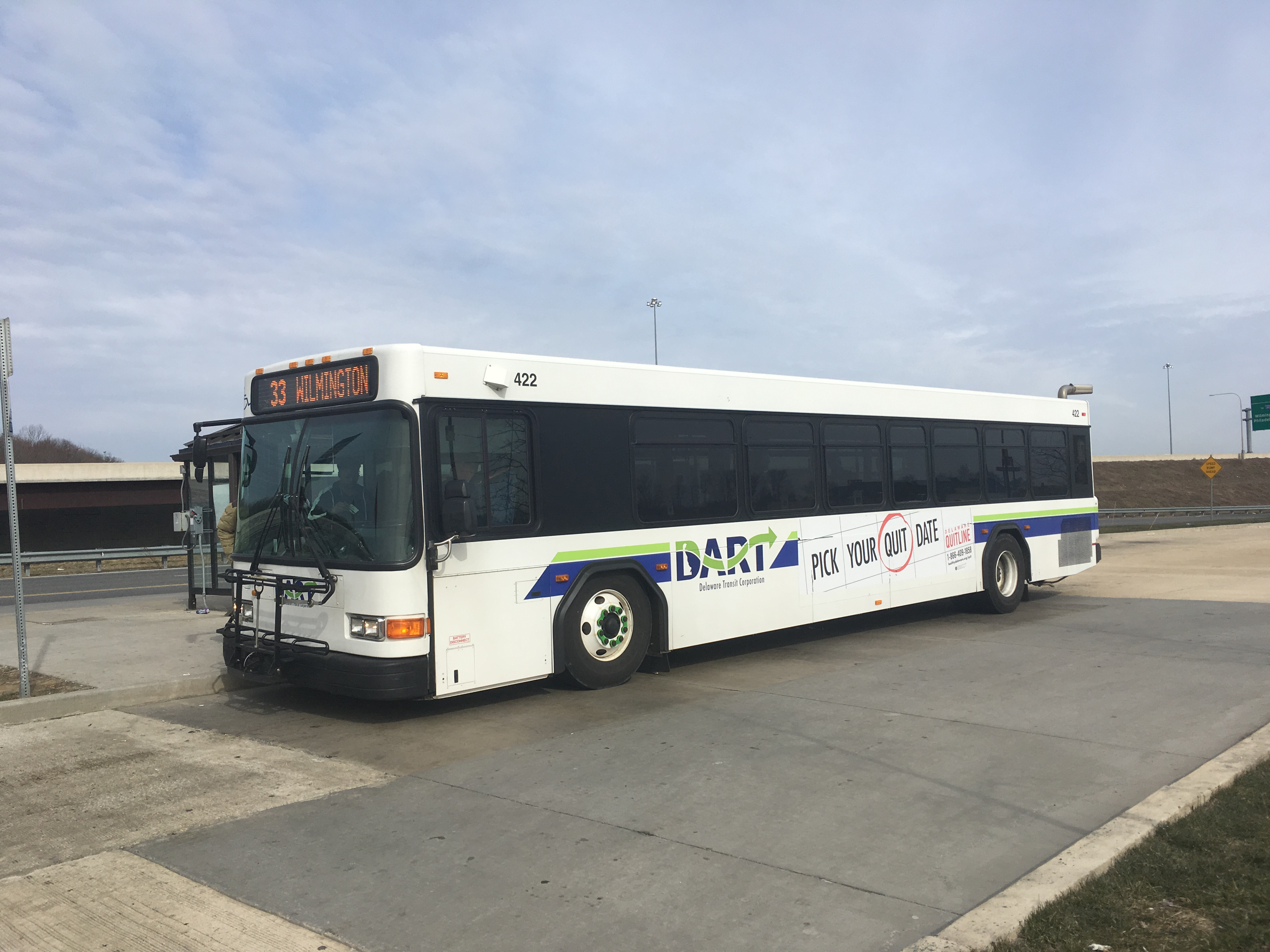
- A DART First State bus at Christiana Mall Park & Ride
- Parent: Delaware Department of Transportation
- Founded: 1994
- Headquarters: 900 Public Safety Boulevard; Dover, Delaware; 119 Lower Beech Street; Wilmington, Delaware, U.S.
- Locale: Delaware
- Service area: Delaware
- Service type: Local and intercity bus service
- Routes: 54 bus 3 on-demand zones
- Stops: 2,295 (April 2024)
- Fleet: 246 bus 286 paratransit
- Daily ridership: 32,400 (weekdays, Q4 2025)
- Annual ridership: 8,059,700 (2025)
- Chief executive: John Sisson
- Website: dartfirststate.com

The Delaware Transit Corporation, operating as DART First State, is the only public transportation system that operates throughout the U.S. state of Delaware. DART First State provides local and inter-county bus service throughout the state and also funds commuter rail service along SEPTA Regional Rail's Wilmington/Newark Line serving the northern part of the state. The agency also operates statewide paratransit service for people with disabilities. DART First State is a subsidiary of the Delaware Department of Transportation (DelDOT).

Although most of its bus routes run in and around Wilmington and Newark in New Castle County, DART operates bus route networks in the Dover area of Kent County; seven year-round bus routes serving Georgetown and Sussex County; and additional seasonal routes connecting Rehoboth Beach, other beach towns in Sussex County, and Ocean City, Maryland. In 2025, the system had a ridership of 8,059,700, or about 32,400 per weekday as of the fourth quarter of 2025.

DART was awarded the prestigious Public Transportation System Outstanding Achievement Award by the American Public Transportation Association in 2003.

== History ==
Former logo, still used on some buses

DART First State traces its origins back to June 30, 1864, when the Wilmington City Railroad Company began trolley service powered by horses and mules along city streets in Wilmington. The Wilmington City Railroad Company introduced electric trolley service in 1888, the first such service in Delaware. Motor buses were first introduced in 1925. The electric trolleys were replaced with trackless electric trolleys in 1938. Bus service operated by Delaware Coach Company replaced the trackless electric trolleys in 1958 and would operate for over a decade. Delaware was also served by several private bus operators. Among these was Short Line, which provided seasonal service to Rehoboth Beach along with service to Oxford, Kennett Square, and West Chester in Pennsylvania. These private bus services were discontinued in the early 1960s.

The Delaware General Assembly created the Delaware Authority for Regional Transit (DART) in 1969 to take over bus service in the Wilmington area from the Delaware Coach Company. DART bus service originally operated under the Greater Wilmington Transportation Authority, but in 1971 the Delaware Department of Transportation (DelDOT) became the governing agency of DART. The Delaware Transit Authority oversaw the Central Delaware Transit (CDT) bus service in the Dover area and the Resort Transit bus service at the Delaware Beaches, which both began in 1990.

In 1994, the Delaware Transit Corporation (DTC) was created by the Delaware General Assembly to manage and operate DART, the Delaware Administration for Specialized Transportation, the Delaware Railroad Administration, and the Commuter Services Administration. DTC operates DART First State bus service throughout the state along with contracting with SEPTA Regional Rail to provide commuter rail service along the Wilmington/Newark Line in New Castle County.

DART First State was named "Most Outstanding Public Transportation System" in 2003 by the American Public Transportation Association.

In 2016, DART First State received a $2 million grant from the Federal Transit Administration (FTA) for six battery electric buses to be used in the Dover area. In 2017, the agency received a $1 million grant from the FTA for ten battery electric buses, eight of which would be used in New Castle County while the other two would be used in Sussex County. The FTA gave DART First State a $2.6 million grant to purchase more electric buses in 2019. DART First State's fleet of battery electric buses are manufactured by Proterra and Gillig.

== Fixed-route bus service ==
=== New Castle County ===
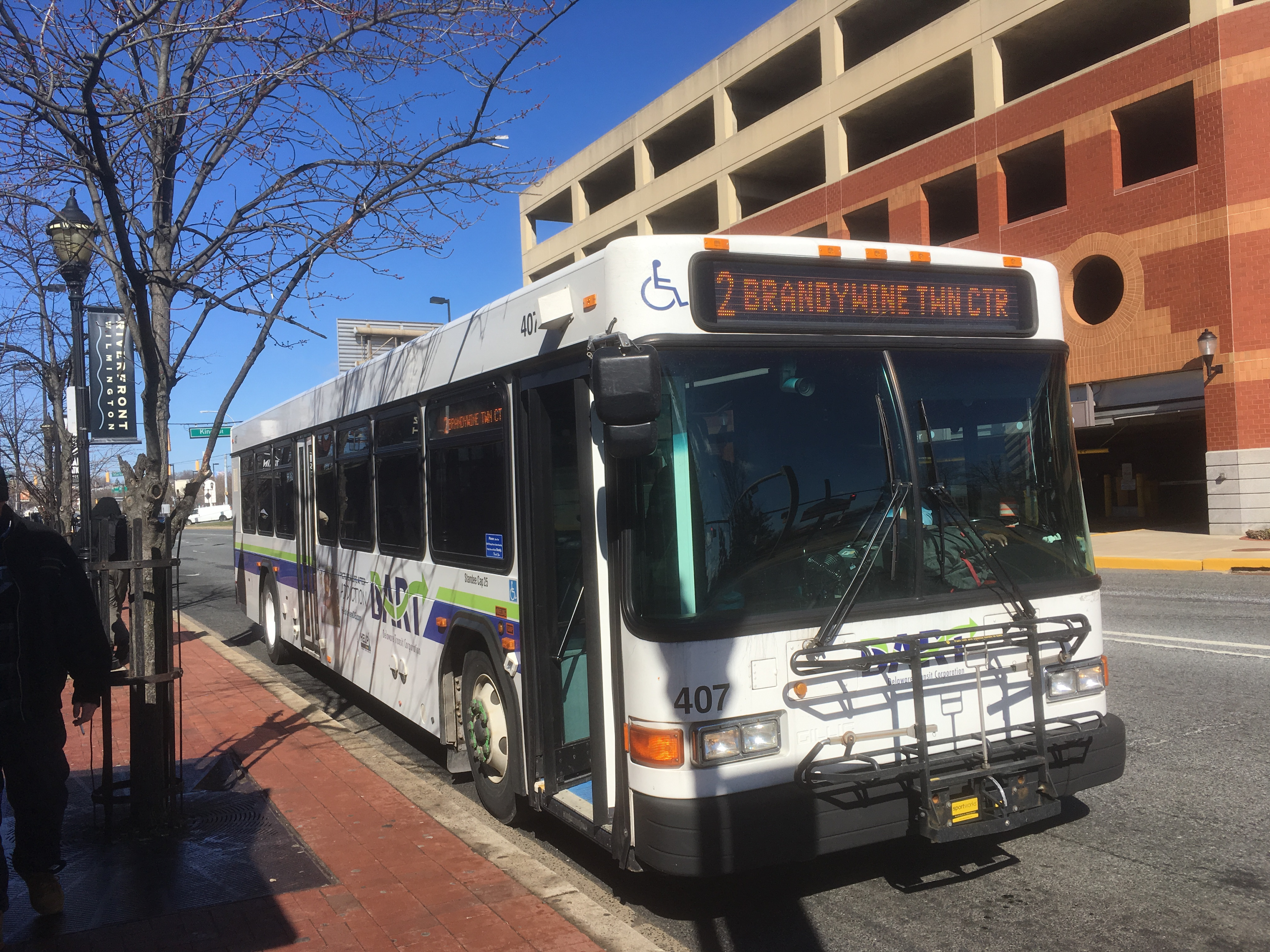
DART First State bus 407 at Wilmington station on the Route 2 line

DART First State operates thirty fixed route bus routes throughout New Castle County, serving Wilmington, Newark, New Castle, and Middletown. The majority of the routes hub in downtown Wilmington, with many of those routes serving the Wilmington Transit Center adjacent to the Wilmington train station. Other major bus hubs in New Castle County include Newark Transit Hub in Newark and the Christiana Mall Park & Ride at the Christiana Mall. Most routes operate Monday through Saturday with some Sunday service. These routes have 1- and 2-digit numbers. All of these routes are directly operated by DART First State, with the exceptions of routes 61 and 62, operated by Transdev.

=== Kent County ===
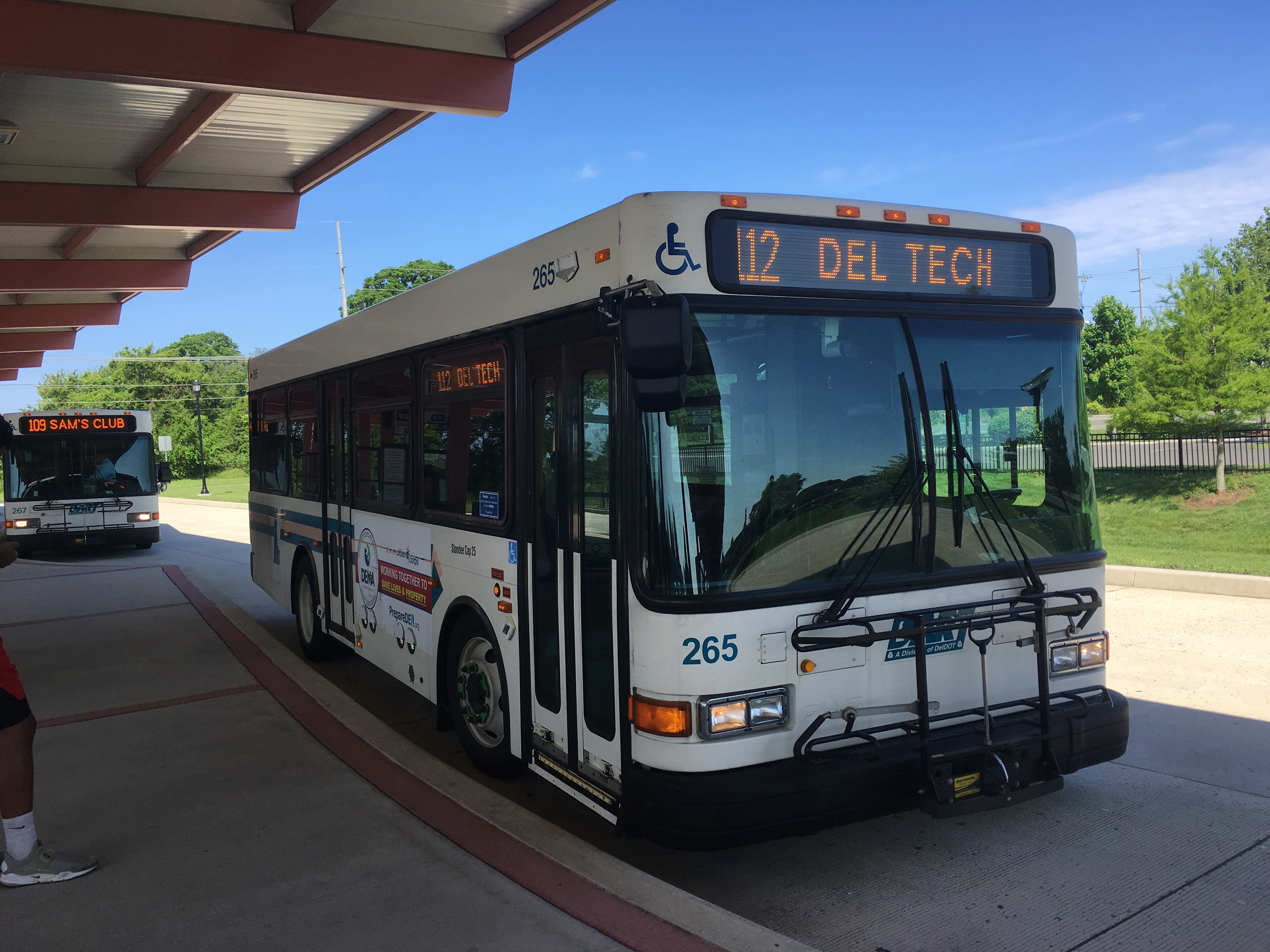
DART First State bus 265 at the Dover Transit Center on the Route 112 line

DART First State operates ten fixed route bus routes within the Dover area in Kent County serving points within Dover along with other communities in Kent County including Camden, Wyoming, Felton, Harrington, and Smyrna. These bus routes operate Monday through Friday with some Saturday service out of the Dover Transit Center in downtown Dover as a hub-and-spoke system. These routes are numbered in the 100-series.

=== Sussex County ===
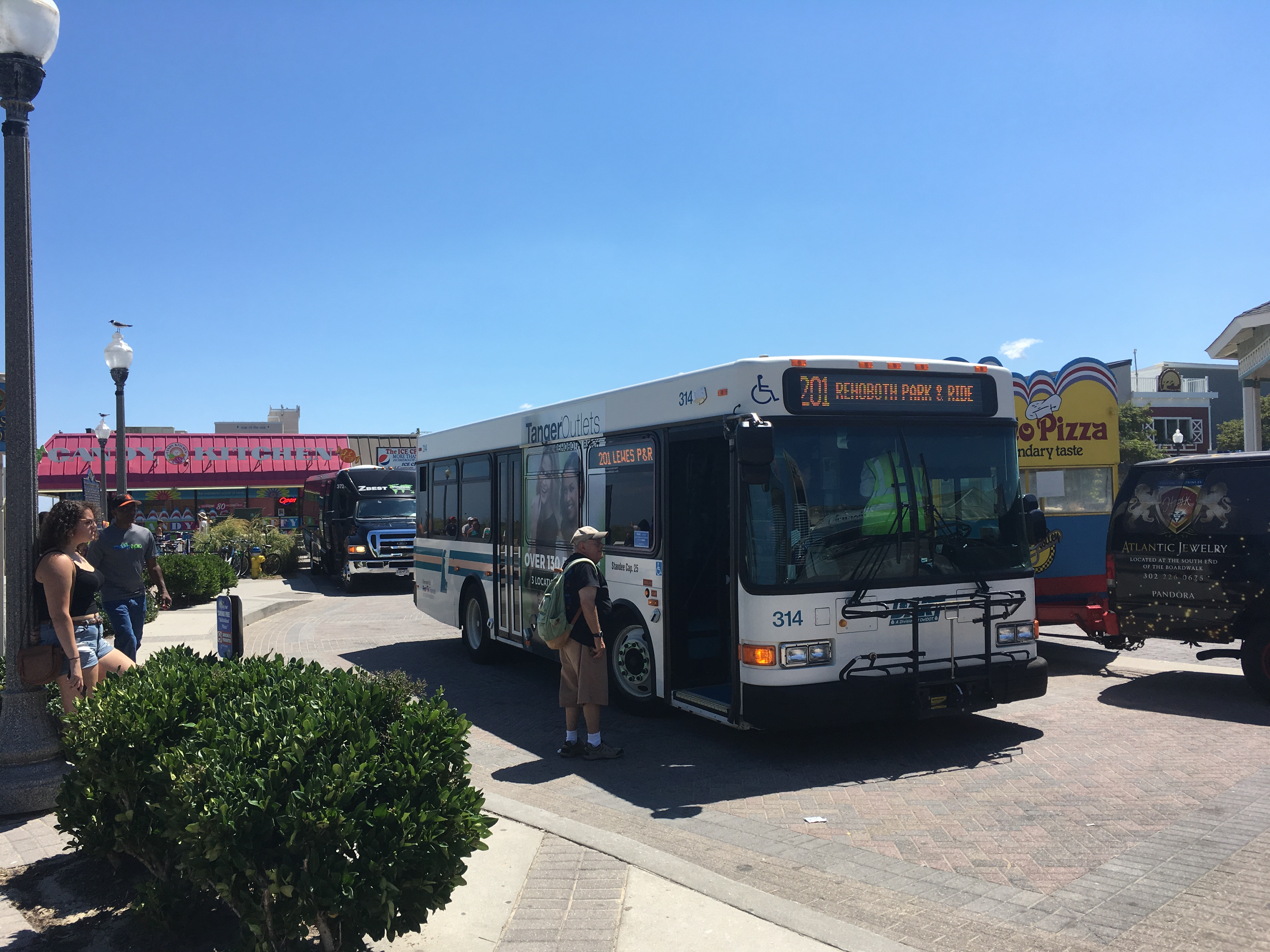
DART First State bus 314 in Rehoboth Beach on the Route 201 line

DART First State operates a total of nine bus routes within Sussex County. Seven of these routes offer year-round fixed route bus service within Sussex County, serving Georgetown, Lewes, Rehoboth Beach, Millsboro, Bridgeville, Seaford, Laurel, Delmar, and Milford. These bus routes operate Monday through Friday with some Saturday service. These routes are numbered in the 200-series. Bus service in Sussex County is operated under contract by Transdev.

==== Beach Bus ====
During the summer months, DART operates expanded service on four of its year-round routes in addition to two summer-only routes, collectively branded as "Beach Bus" services. These buses hub at the Rehoboth Beach Park and Ride and Lewes Transit Center park and ride lots, offering connecting service to coastal communities along the Delaware Beaches and to Ocean City, Maryland daily from May to September.

=== Intercounty service ===
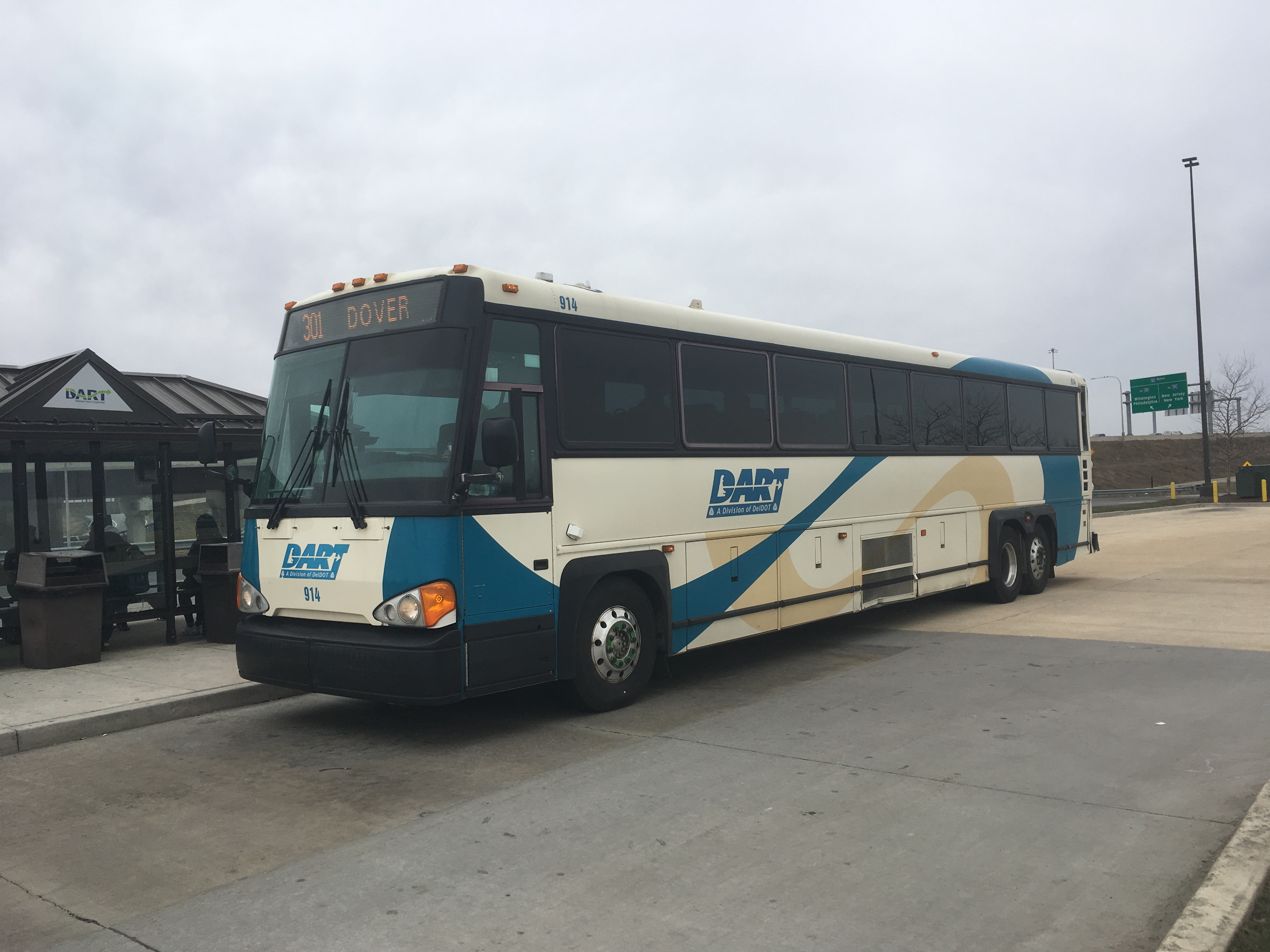
DART First State bus 914 at the Christiana Mall Park & Ride on the Route 301 line

DART First State operates four intercounty bus routes which connect the three counties. These routes are numbered in the 300-series. All year-round intercounty routes terminate at the Dover Transit Center, running to Wilmington, Middletown, Georgetown, and the Lewes Transit Center. During the summer months, an additional route connecting Wilmington with Lewes via Christiana Mall, Odessa, and North Dover runs on weekends and holidays. DART First State directly operates all these routes except Route 303, which is operated under contract by Transdev.

== DART Connect ==
DART Connect is a microtransit service operated by DART First State in the city of Newark in New Castle County and the Georgetown and Millsboro areas in Sussex County. The service operates similar to a rideshare and provides on-demand service using minibuses, as opposed to a traditional bus service that follows a published schedule. Rides can be booked using the DART Connect app or over the phone. Fares are the same as traditional bus service. DART Connect service is offered Monday-Friday year-round. DART Connect service began in the Georgetown and Millsboro areas on April 12, 2021, replacing Flex Routes 901F and 902F. In August 2023, DART Connect service began in Newark, replacing the UNICITY bus service that ended service on September 29, 2023.

== Paratransit service ==
DART First State offers paratransit service for people with disabilities who are unable to use fixed-route bus service in accordance with the Americans with Disabilities Act (ADA). Paratransit trips that begin and end within 3/4 mile (1.2 km) of fixed-route bus service when such service operates are considered ADA Paratransit trips while all other trips are considered non-ADA Demand Response trips.

== Rail service ==
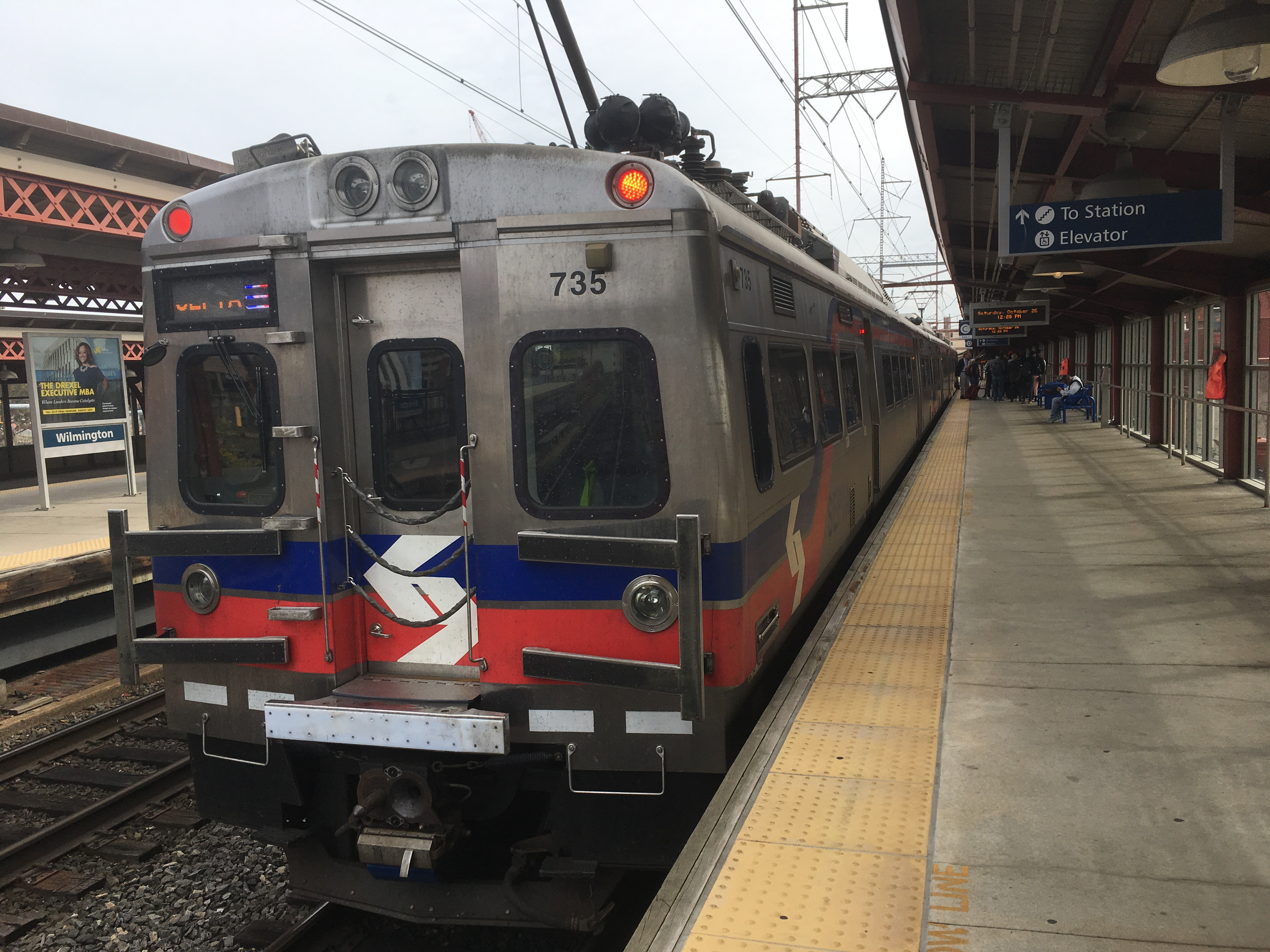
SEPTA Regional Rail train along the Wilmington/Newark Line at Wilmington station

DART First State, through DelDOT, funds the segment of the Wilmington/Newark Line of SEPTA Regional Rail within the state of Delaware. SEPTA operates the service under contract with DART First State. Signage at the Delaware stations differs from that at other SEPTA Regional Rail stations, as the stations are owned by DART First State and not SEPTA. These trains originate in Philadelphia and operate to Wilmington station in Wilmington, with an intermediate stop at Claymont station. Some weekday rush-hour trains continue on to Newark station in Newark, with an intermediate stop at Churchmans Crossing station, located near the Delaware Park horse racing track and casino.

== Park and ride lots ==
There are 37 park and ride lots located throughout the state of Delaware, primarily in New Castle County, that allow motorists to park and transfer to DART First State buses or meet a carpool. There are also 12 park and pool lots in the state where motorists can park and meet a carpool.

== Delaware Commute Solutions ==
Delaware Commute Solutions
- Company type: Subsidiary
- Industry: Commuter benefits
- Founded: 1997
- Headquarters: Wilmington, DE
- Area served: Delaware residents, employees, and students
- Parent: DART First State
- Website: delawarecommutesolutions.org

Delaware Commute Solutions was formed by DART First State in 1997 in order to reduce traffic and encourage alternative transportation arrangements. It helps form carpools and vanpools and offers commuter programs, such as a Guaranteed Ride Home and a rewards program. The program is supported by state and federal funds as part of Delaware's efforts to maintain air quality.

== Fares ==
Most DART First State bus routes have a base fare of $2 per zone. Routes 61 and 62 have a base fare of $1. Cash fares must be paid in exact change. DART First State bus fares may also be paid with DART Pass, a smartphone app. A reduced fare of $0.80 per zone is available for senior citizens, Medicare card holders, and disabled persons. Kids below 46" (limit two per adult) and the blind ride for free. A student fare of $1 per zone is available, with a student ID required for students age 17 and older. DART First State does not issue transfers. DART First State offers a Daily Pass for $4 per zone, a 7-Consecutive Day Pass for $16 per zone, a 30-Consecutive Day Pass for $60 per zone, and a 20-Ride Pass (DART Pass app only) for $26 per zone. DART First State has three fare zones which correspond with the three counties of Delaware.

The fare for ADA Paratransit trips is $4 while the fare for non-ADA Demand Response Trips is $6. A County Connector fee of $4 is charged on paratransit trips that cross into another county. Paratransit fares must be paid in cash with exact change or with paratransit strip tickets. DART First State offers $2 paratransit strip tickets available as a strip of 6 tickets for $12.

=== Former fare payment methods ===
Until February 2021, DART First State offered a stored value card called DARTCard that could be used to pay for single-ride bus fares or a Daily Pass. DARTCards were available in six denominations (Gold, Blue, Yellow, Green, Purple, and Platinum) ranging from $9.60 to $65 for regular fares along with a $14 Red DARTCard for reduced fares for senior citizens and disabled persons. DARTCards provided a discount off the regular fare, with the discount increasing the more expensive the card is. For example, the Gold DARTCard cost $9.60 and had a value of $12 for a 20% discount; while the Platinum DARTCard cost $65 and had a value of $108 for a 40% discount. The reduced fare DARTCard cost $14 and had a value of $46 for a 70% discount. DARTCards were not rechargeable and a new one must be purchased once the value is used up. DARTCards were available from DART First State by purchasing over the phone, by mail, or online; they were also available at select retailers across the state.

SEPTA Trail Passes on a SEPTA Key card were formerly allowed to be used on buses in northern New Castle County. On January 1, 2021, SEPTA Key cards were no longer accepted on DART First State buses, as the fareboxes cannot read the card to confirm the purchase of a TrailPass and due to widespread fraudulent use.

== Fleet ==
DART First State's bus fleet consists of 246 fixed-route buses (shown in the table below) and 286 paratransit buses. The fixed route bus fleet consists of Gillig Low Floor diesel, hybrid electric, and battery electric buses, Proterra Catalyst battery electric buses, and MCI D4500CT diesel buses used exclusively for intercounty service. The agency also owns four rail cars used by SEPTA: Silverliner V 735, 736, 871, and 872.

Fleet number(s)	Year	Manufacturer	Model	Powertrain	Transmission
151-157	2012	Gillig	Low Floor HEV 40'	Cummins ISL9	Allison H 40 EP hybrid system
168	2012	Gillig	Low Floor HEV 35'	Cummins ISL9	Allison H 40 EP hybrid system
283–284, 286	2009	Gillig	Low Floor 29'	Cummins ISL	Allison B400R
301–310, 312–322	2010	Gillig	Low Floor 29'	Cummins ISL9	Allison B400R
401–438, 440, 442–472	2014	Gillig	Low Floor 40'	Cummins ISL9	Allison B400R
473–474	2015	Gillig	Low Floor 40'	Cummins ISL9	Allison B400R
501–518, 520–522	2020	Gillig	Low Floor 40'	Cummins ISL9	ZF EcoLife 6AP1400B
601–606	2016	Gillig	Low Floor 29'	Cummins ISL9	Allison B400R
607–610	2017	Gillig	Low Floor 29'	Cummins L9	Allison B400R
611–613	2019	Gillig	Low Floor 29'	Cummins L9	ZF EcoLife 6AP1400B
614–626	2020	Gillig	Low Floor 29'	Cummins L9	ZF EcoLife 6AP1400B
707–714	2019	Proterra	Catalyst BE35	Electric drive	Eaton EEV-7202
715–716	2020	Proterra	Catalyst BE40	Electric drive	Eaton EEV-7202
717–720	2021	Gillig	Low Floor EV 40'	Electric drive	Eaton EEV-7202
721–732	2023	Proterra	Catalyst BE35	Electric drive	Eaton EEV-7202
914-919	2012	MCI	D4500CT	Cummins ISL9	Allison B500R
920–923	2017	MCI	D4500CT	Cummins ISX12	Allison B500R
1776–1777	2017	Ford	E450	V10 Propane	6spd Auto
21001–21021	2021	Gillig	Low Floor 40'	Cummins L9	ZF EcoLife 6AP1400B
22001–22014	2022	Gillig	Low Floor 29'	Cummins L9	ZF EcoLife 6AP1420B
22015–22030	2023	Gillig	Low Floor 40'	Cummins L9	ZF EcoLife 6AP1420B
23901–23904	2024	Gillig	Low Floor 40' suburban	Cummins L9	ZF EcoLife 6AP1420B
24001-24004	2025	Gillig	Low Floor 29'	Cummins L9	ZF EcoLife 6AP1420B
