= Christiana Mall =

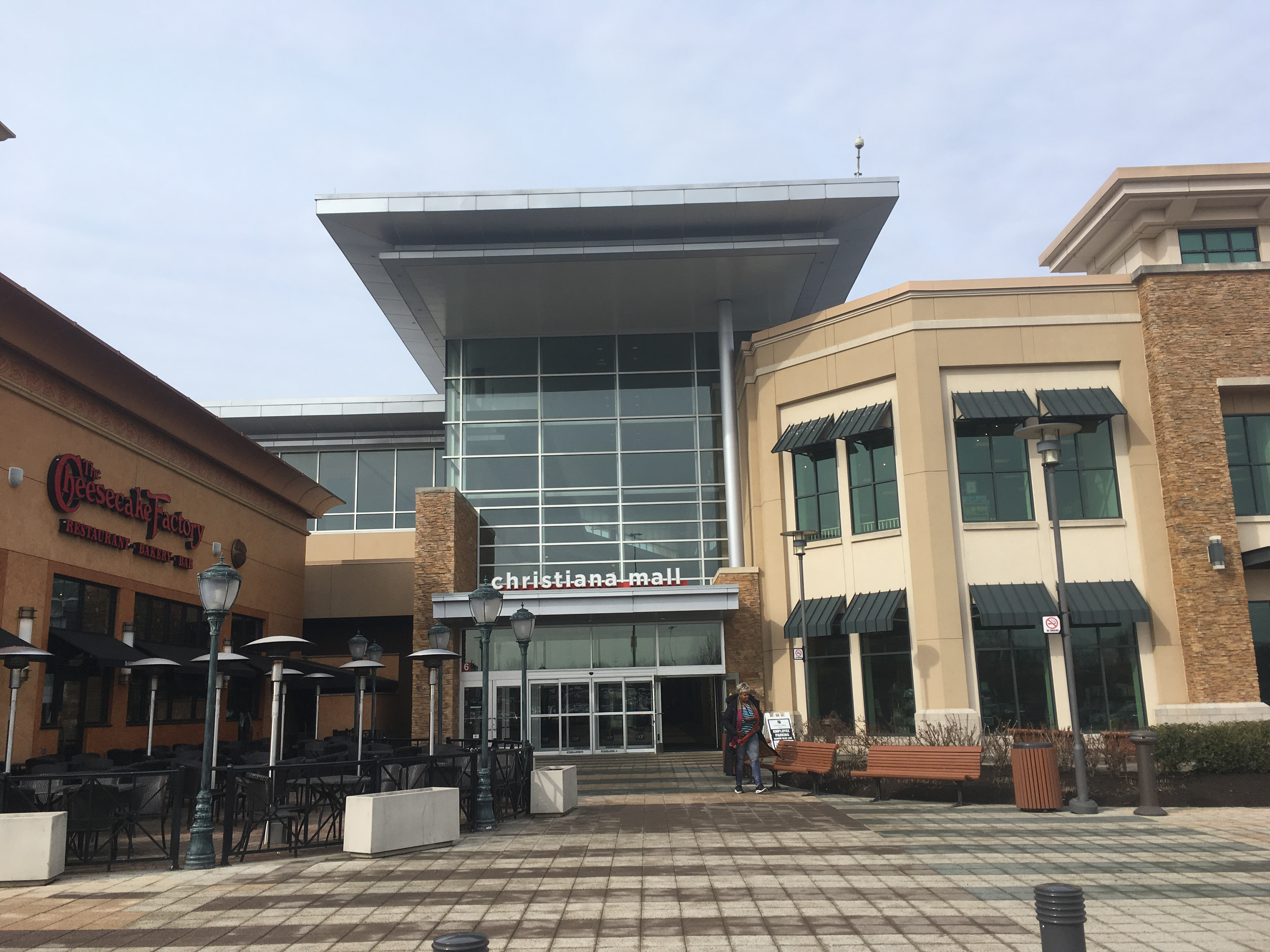
- Entrance to the food court, 2018
- Location: Christiana, Delaware, United States
- Coordinates: 39°40′43″N 75°39′10″W
- Address: 132 Christiana Mall; Newark, DE 19702
- Opened: October 12, 1978; 48 years ago
- Developer: The Rubin Organization and New Castle Associates
- Manager: GGP
- Owner: GGP
- Num. of stores: 179
- Num. of anchor tenants: 5
- Floor area: 1,267,241 square feet (117,731 m^{2})
- Floors: 1 (2 in Barnes & Noble, former Forever 21, JCPenney, H&M, Macy's, and former Nordstrom)
- Parking: Parking lot with 6,300 spaces
- Public transit: DART First State bus: 5, 15, 33, 51, 55, 64, 301, 305 at the Christiana Mall Park & Ride
- Website: christianamall.com

Christiana Mall is a shopping mall located in Christiana, Delaware between the cities of Newark and Wilmington. The one-level, enclosed super-regional mall is situated at the intersection of Interstate 95 (exit 4A) and Delaware Route 1/Delaware Route 7 (DE 1 exit 164) near the center of the Northeast megalopolis.

Christiana Mall has three anchor stores - Macy's, JCPenney, and Target - along with Barnes & Noble as a junior anchor and Cabela's and Cinemark Theatres as outparcels. The mall contains 179 shops, and is owned and managed by GGP, a subsidiary of BGRE. It has 1,267,241 square feet (117,731 m^{2}) of gross leasable area. Christiana Mall is the largest shopping mall in the state of Delaware. The Christiana Mall is located nearly 40 miles (64 km) southwest of Center City, Philadelphia. Due to the lack of sales tax in Delaware, the mall attracts numerous shoppers from neighboring states.

== Location ==
The Christiana Mall is located in an unincorporated area of northern New Castle County, Delaware near the community of Christiana between the Delaware cities of Wilmington and Newark and the larger cities of Philadelphia and Baltimore. The mall is situated southeast of an interchange between Interstate 95 and Delaware Route 1/Delaware Route 7. Access to the mall is from exit 164 of DE 1, which connects to Mall Road, the ring road around the mall. Exit 4A of I-95 provides access to southbound DE 1 and Mall Road. The trade area surrounding Christiana Mall has a population of 680,804.

Christiana Mall is served by DART First State bus routes 5, 15, 33, 51, 55, and 64 providing local bus service to Wilmington, Newark, and other points in New Castle County along with inter-county bus service along Route 301 to Dover and seasonal service along Route 305 to Lewes. All buses serving the Christiana Mall stop at the Christiana Mall Park & Ride near the former Nordstrom while routes 5, 15, and 51 also serve the bus stop near Target.

== Description ==
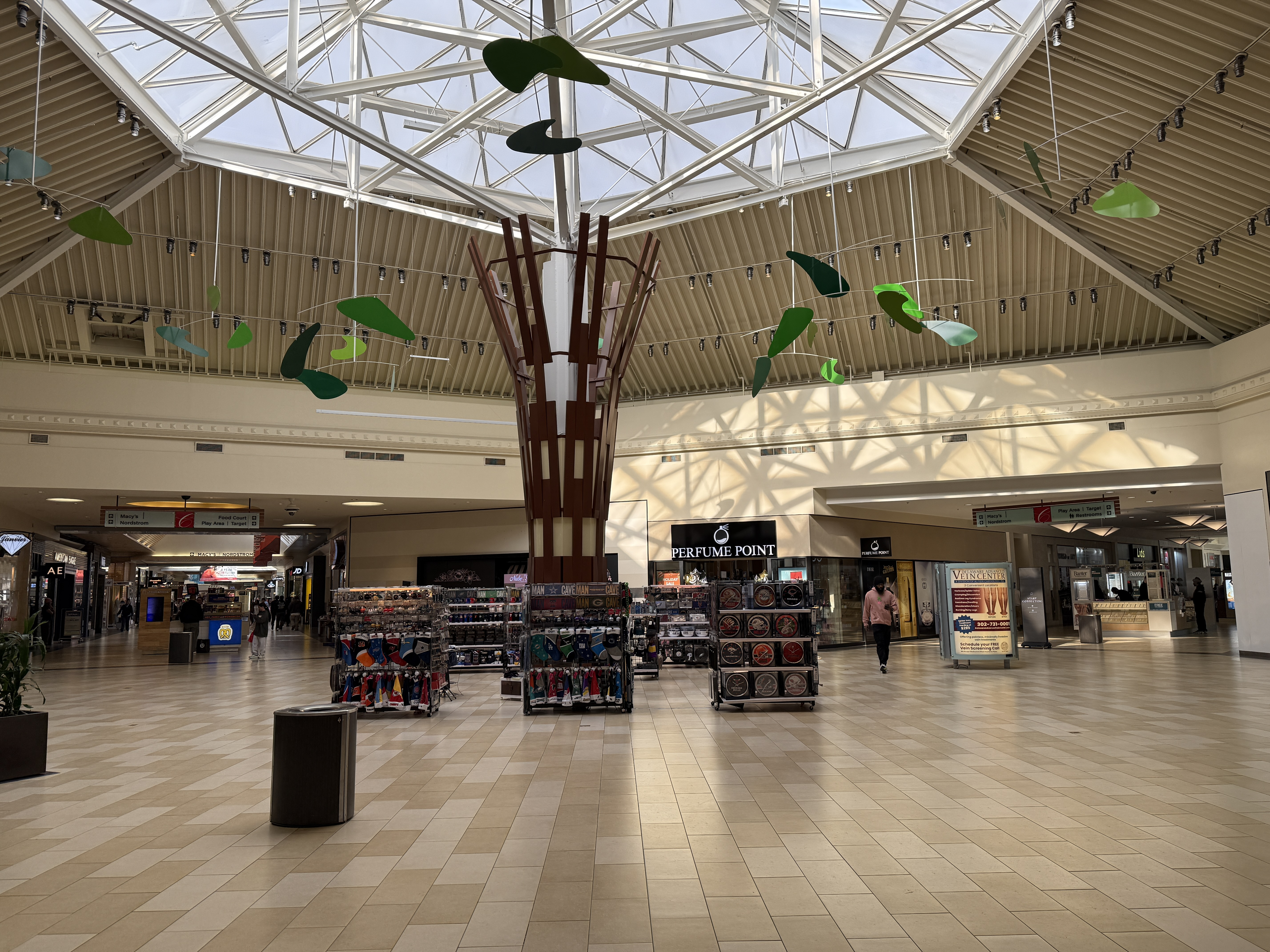
Christiana Mall from JCPenney

Christiana Mall contains 1,267,241 square feet (117,731 m^{2}) of retail space and has 182 stores. The mall is anchored by JCPenney, Macy's and Target, with Barnes & Noble serving as a junior anchor and Cabela's and Cinemark Theatres serving as outparcels. The mall also includes major inline tenants such as the Apple Store, Lululemon, & White House Black Market. Christiana Mall has various dining options including a 13-bay food court and full-service restaurants such as P.F. Chang's and The Cheesecake Factory.

The Christiana Mall is a popular destination for shoppers in the Philadelphia metropolitan area while also attracting visitors from the New York, Baltimore, and Washington, D.C. areas looking for tax-free shopping. The mall attracts over 20 million visitors annually. Christiana Mall is one of the top producing malls in the United States. The Apple Store at the Christiana Mall claims to sell more iPhones than any other location in the chain. The Christiana Mall has an appraised value of over $1 billion.

Basketball player Charles Barkley's daughter, Christiana, was named after the mall. In a 2021 podcast, he explained, "...I just liked the mall."

== Anchor stores ==
- JCPenney – (2 floors, opened in 1978, original anchor)
- Macy's – (2 floors, opened in 1986, previously Bamberger's)
- Target – (1 floor, opened in 2010, built on the site of the former 2 floor Lord & Taylor, Hecht's and Wanamaker's)
- Barnes & Noble – (2 floors, opened in 2009)
- Akira – (1 floor, with unused second floor, formerly Forever 21 from 2009-2025)
- Dick’s House of Sport - (coming soon, 2 floors, formerly Nordstrom from 2011-2026)

== History ==
=== Early history ===
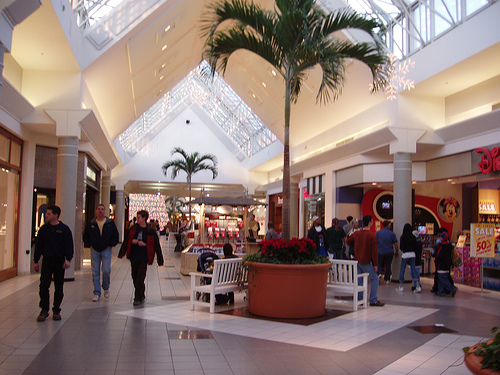
Wanamaker's/Lord & Taylor (now Target) wing, prior to renovations

Christiana Mall was developed in the late 1970s by The Rubin Organization and New Castle Associates to compete with the smaller Triangle Mall (later New Castle Square Mall) and Castle Mall (Pencader Plaza) a few miles away. The land that the mall was built on consisted of four family farms; the main building of the mall was the Lynam family farm, the Cabela's site and parts of I-95 was the Morgan farm, and adjacent retail developments consisted of land from the Clayville and Carroll farms.

Strawbridge & Clothier was the first store to open in September, 1978. It included a tall clock tower outside, a fountain under the escalators, second floor restaurant with balcony, and a large cascading fountain in the mall court. Shortly after, on October 12, 1978, the first phase of the mall opened to the public which included small shops from Strawbridge & Clothier to the Bamberger's court (which is now Macy's) which included a second fountain. Bamberger's and the wing to and including JCPenney was constructed in phase 2 which opened in 1979 and later added the Cupboard food court, Christiana Cinemas I-V and Galaxy Arcade.

=== Department store changes ===
The 1990s brought a lot of department store changes for Christiana Mall. In 1991, Wanamaker's opened a 2 level anchor store at the mall. It was the last Wanamaker's store to be built. In 1995, Hecht's of Washington, DC, a division of the May Department Stores Company of St. Louis, acquired the Wanamaker's chain, converting all locations to Hecht's. A year later, Hecht's also acquired the Strawbridge & Clothier chain, which was historically Wanamaker's main rival (and co-anchor at Christiana Mall). Since the renamed Wanamaker's did not do as well as projected with the Hecht's name, the decision was made to keep the Strawbridge's name, although the Clothier was dropped. The 190,000-square-foot (18,000 m^{2}) former Wanamaker's store was refitted for Lord & Taylor in 1997. It was the only Lord & Taylor location in Delaware.

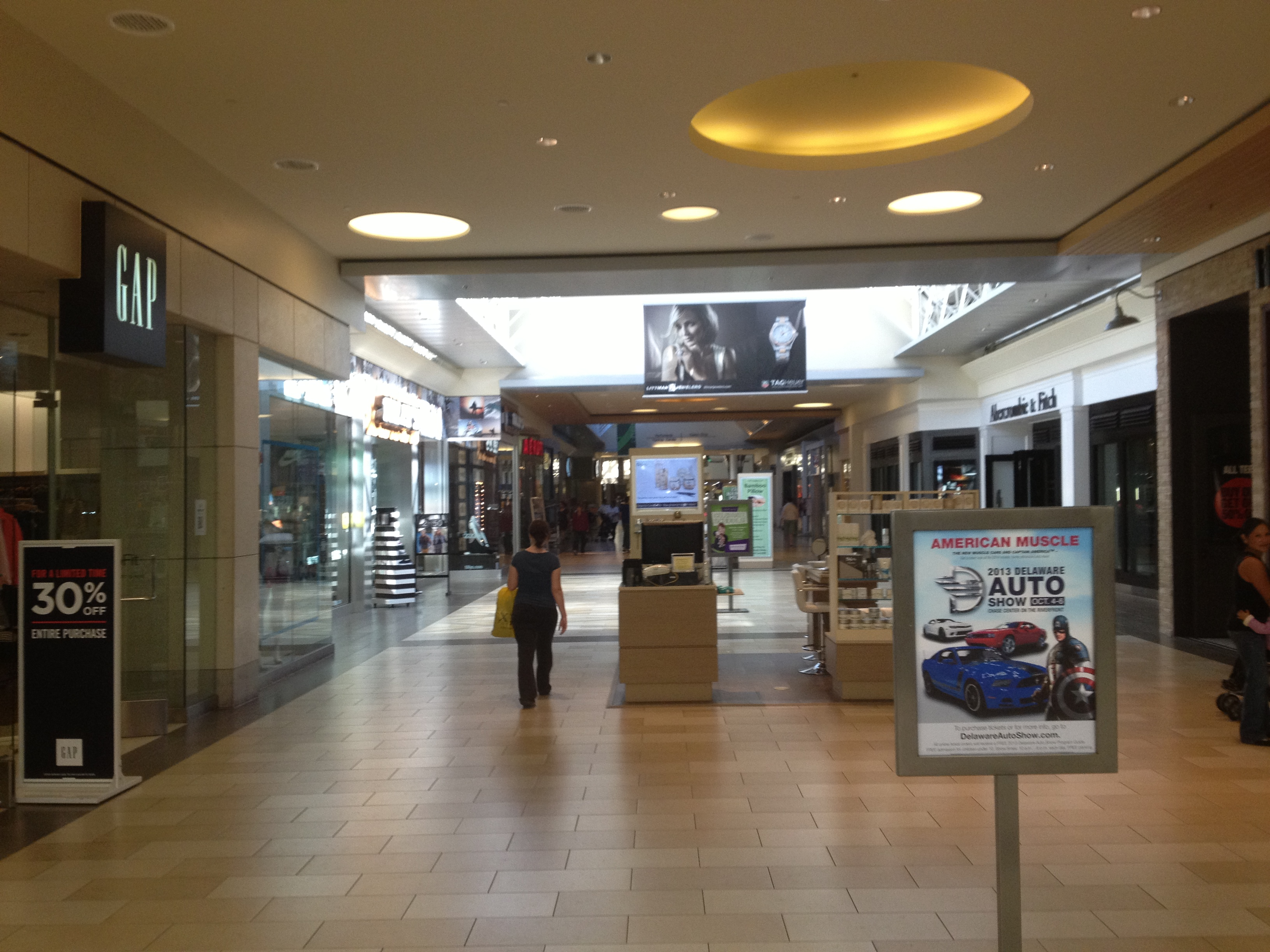
Christiana Mall between Macy's and JCPenney

Things calmed down until 2005 when Federated Department Stores, which owned Macy's and Bloomingdales, bought the May department store chains. The purchase left Federated with three of the four anchor stores at Christiana Mall: Macy's, Strawbridge's, and Lord & Taylor. Federated closed Strawbridge's and the Lord & Taylor location in 2006. Mall owner General Growth Properties acquired the Strawbridge's building for an undisclosed price, but no definite plans were announced at that time for the former Lord & Taylor space.

The vacant Lord & Taylor was ultimately demolished in early 2010 to build a one-level Target store. Target opened for business later that year, on October 10, 2010.

The vacant Strawbridge's store was demolished in 2008. A 123,000-square-foot (11,400 m^{2}) Nordstrom store, along with a new wing of additional high-end retailers, was built to replace Strawbridge's. Nordstrom opened on April 8, 2011, as the first store in the state of Delaware and third in the Philadelphia area.

In 2013, construction began on the outside of the ring road opposite Nordstrom on a 100,000-square-foot (9,300 m^{2}) Cabela's store. Cabela's opened in May 2014.

Additional construction was completed for a new 12-screen cinema Cinemark Theatres complex, which opened in November 2014.

On February 28, 2026, it was announced that the Nordstrom store at Christiana Mall will close on April 30. In July 2026, Dick's Sporting Goods purchased the former Nordstrom anchor space for $8.79 million.

=== Ownership changes ===
In March 2003, The Rouse Company agreed with PREIT to acquire 50% stake in Christiana. Rouse received its stake in Christiana and $225 million in cash in exchange PREIT would receive six malls and assume $285 million in mortgage debt. PREIT would also hand over $38 million worth of stock to a partnership controlled by its executives that held the stake in Christiana. The six malls Rouse traded were older properties anchored by such stores as Strawbridge's, Sears and JCPenney. The malls were Cherry Hill Mall, Moorestown Mall, Plymouth Meeting Mall, The Gallery at Market East, Exton Square Mall and Echelon Mall. Rouse's strategy in the trade was to upgrading their assets. By acquiring Christiana, which is one of the top-production malls in the United States, Rouse achieved this mission while shedding properties that better fit into PREIT's portfolio.

=== 1991 redevelopment ===
The first renovation and expansion of the mall was completed in 1991. It consisted of the triangular Wanamaker's concourses extending from Macy's and JCPenney. Where the two converged was an atrium of full-ceiling skylights and a new fountain, becoming the new center court where the majority of events take place.

=== 2008–2011 redevelopment ===
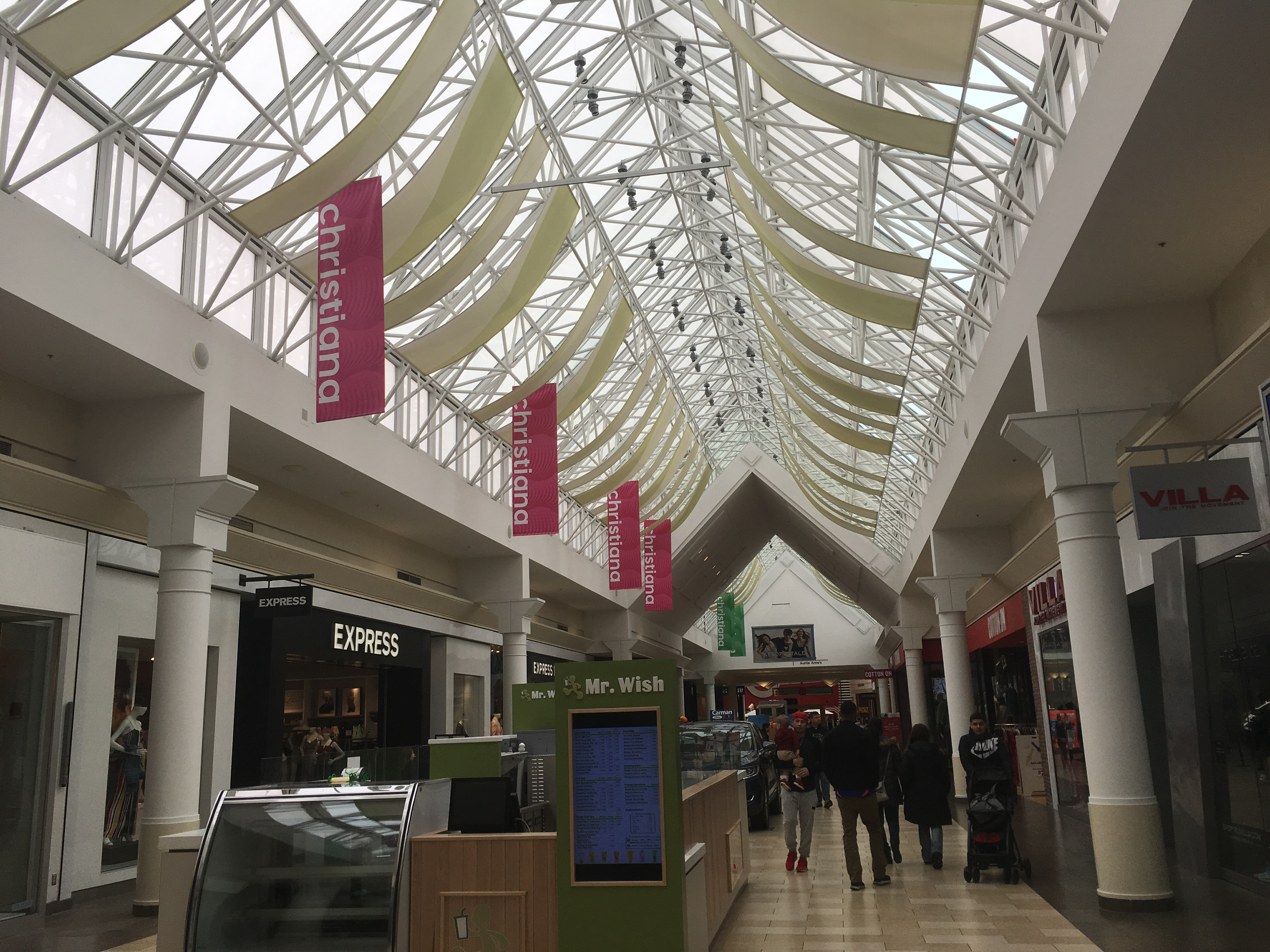
Christiana Mall between Macy's and Target

General Growth Properties purchased the former Lord & Taylor store, planning a new concept known as "The Epicenter Collection", an Internet catalog showroom. Those plans were abandoned by December 2008, when the empty anchor was sold to Target Corporation. The building was demolished in March 2010 and Target opened October 10, 2010. A new food court opened in Spring 2009 in space previously occupied by a movie theater. The original food court was converted to retail space. Plans for expansion included demolishing the 214,000-square-foot (19,900 m^{2}) Strawbridge's store and building a new two-story wing connected to a two-level 140,000-square-foot (13,000 m^{2}) Nordstrom. The new addition opened on April 8, 2011 without the second floor.

An outdoor "avenue style" retail space was added to two sides of the center. Additions included new lighting, flooring, seating areas and two-story high entrances, along with new restaurants. The project moved, updated, or replaced up to 100 of the center's stores.

=== 2013–2014 redevelopment ===
In 2013, work began on development of a 100,000-square-foot (9,300 m^{2}) square foot Cabela's store, a 50,000-square-foot (4,600 m^{2}) square foot 12-screen Cinemark Theatres both as outparcels to the mall. As a part of this exterior development project the mall's ring-road will be widened and additional parking will be added. The I-95 flyover ramps were completed in the fall of 2013 and dedicated by Governor Jack Markell on October 17, 2013.

Exterior development projects were completed in 2014. Cabela's opened in May and the 12-screen Cinemark Theatre opened in November. In the spring and summer of 2014, Christiana Mall added many new stores to the interior of the mall while many existing stores remodeled.
