= Churchmans Crossing station =

Rail station in Newark, Delaware, US

Churchmans Crossing
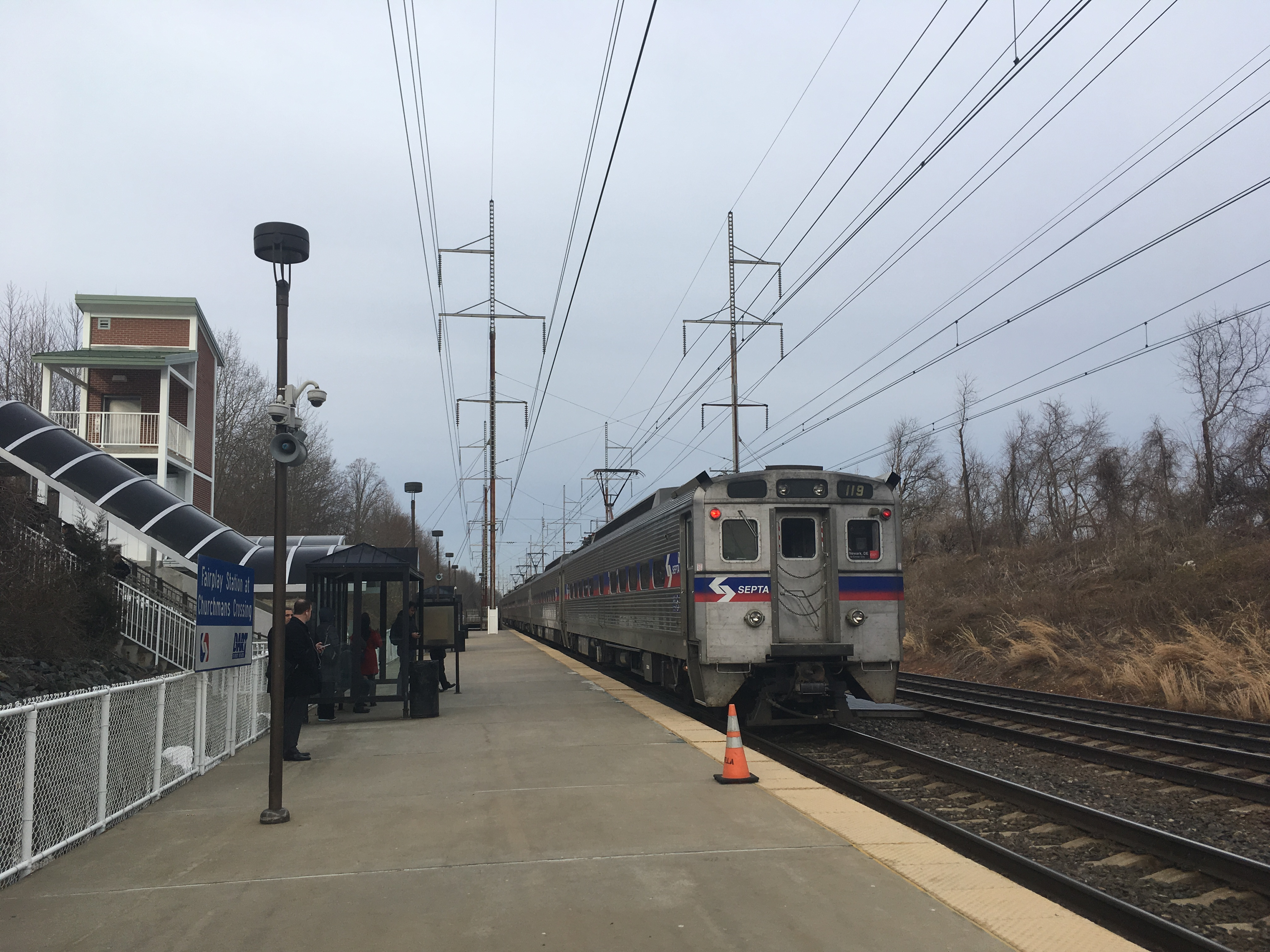
- Churchmans Crossing station platform

General information
- Other names: Fairplay Station at Churchmans Crossing
- Location: 1 Fairplay Boulevard; Newark, Delaware
- Coordinates: 39°41′38″N 75°40′21″W
- Owner: DART First State
- Platforms: 1 side platform
- Tracks: 3
- Connections: DART First State: 64

Construction
- Parking: 230 spaces
- Cycle facilities: 5 rack spaces
- Accessible: Yes

Other information
- Fare zone: 4

History
- Opened: June 29, 2000
- Electrified: 1935

Passengers
- 2017: 321 boardings, 330 alightings (weekday average)
- Rank: 83 of 146

Services
Preceding station	SEPTA	Following station
Newark Terminus	Wilmington/Newark Line	Wilmington toward Temple University
Location

Churchmans Crossing station is a SEPTA Regional Rail station in Newark, Delaware. Located at 1 Fairplay Boulevard, it serves the Wilmington/Newark Line. The station lies on the property of the Delaware Park Racetrack, and has a 125-space parking lot. It is served by SEPTA on weekdays only. Churchmans Crossing station is referred to as Fairplay Station at Churchmans Crossing by DART First State.

Churchmans Crossing station consists of six plexiglass shelters within the parking lot. Access to the platform is available from a staircase leading down an embankment which runs parallel to the Delaware Park Boulevard bridge over the tracks. An elevator next to the staircase provides handicapped accessibility. The station opened in 2000.

== Station layout ==
Churchmans Crossing consists of a side platform adjacent to Track 1 that serves all SEPTA trains.
