= Tower Hill School =

Prep school in Wilmington, Delaware, US

- Tower Hill School

Location
- 2813 West 17th Street; Wilmington, Delaware 19806; United States; 39°45′53″N 75°34′38″W

Information
- School type: Private College Preparatory School
- Motto: Multa Bene Facta (Many Things Done Well)
- Religious affiliation: Non-denominational
- Founded: 1919 (107 years ago)
- Founders: Walter S. Carpenter Jr., R. Ruliph M. Carpenter, Irénée du Pont, Lammot du Pont, Eugene E. du Pont, Alexis Felix du Pont, Josiah Marvel, Hugh Rodney Sharp, William Winder Laird, Charles Marshall Barton, and Dr. Albert Robin
- CEEB code: 080205
- Chair: Ben duPont
- Head of school: Sarah Baker
- Grades: Preschool K–12
- Gender: Coeducational
- Enrollment: 867
- Student to teacher ratio: 7:1
- Schedule: Day
- Colors: Kelly green and white
- Athletics: Independent Conference(DISC); Delaware Interscholastic Athletic Association (DIAA)
- Mascot: White Tiger and Hiller
- Publication: The Dial
- Website: www.towerhill.org

Tower Hill School is a private college preparatory school in Wilmington, Delaware, offering instruction for pre-school through 12th grade.

== History ==
Tower Hill was founded in 1919. Its main building was designed by Wilmington architects Brown & Whiteside and completed in 1920. The school is situated at the high point of Wilmington's neighborhood, The Highlands, where the dominant landmark is Rockford Tower, erected in 1901 to control the city's water supply. Tower Hill, in London, is the birthplace of William Penn, the founder of Pennsylvania, who landed in Delaware, in 1682.

== Recognition ==
The school is a member of the Delaware Independent School Conference. The school offered US$2,000,000 a year of need-based financial aid to 28% of its students for the 2016–2017 school year. The Wall Street Journal ranked Tower Hill 24th in the nation and 1st in Delaware, in percentage of students attending eight top colleges. Tower Hill School is ranked 47th in the nation for best private day schools.

== Notable alumni ==
- Adrienne Arsht, philanthropist and attorney
- Michael N. Castle, Governor of Delaware (1985–1992) and US Congressman (Delaware) (1993–2011)
- Alfred D. Chandler, distinguished and innovative historian, Harvard University
- Chris Coons, US Senator (Delaware)
- Crawford Hallock Greenewalt Jr., leading archaeologist University of California, Berkeley
- Kathryn Day, opera singer
- Harry G. Haskell Jr., US Congressman (Delaware) (1957–1959) and Mayor of Wilmington (1969–1973)
- Deborah Kean, former First Lady of New Jersey (1982–1990)
- Orin Kerr, law professor at UC Berkeley School of Law
- Ellen J. Kullman, former chief executive officer of DuPont and vice chair of the Tower Hill School board of trustees
- Jim Morris (film producer), President of Pixar Animation Studios
- Mehmet Oz, host of The Dr. Oz Show, cardiologist, Republican Party nominee in the 2022 United States Senate election in Pennsylvania, the 17th administrator of the Centers for Medicare & Medicaid Services (CMS) since 2025.
- Donnan Plumb, Olympic equestrian
- Virginia A. Seitz, former assistant attorney general and distinguished appellate lawyer
- John A. H. Sweeney, museum curator and author
- Pat Williams, Orlando Magic senior vice president
