= Oldest railroads in North America =

List of earliest railroads in North America

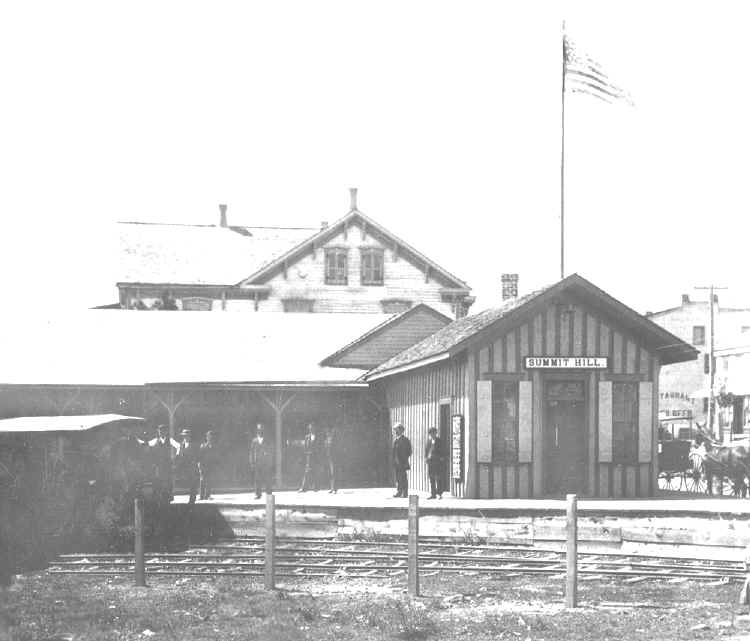
A Gilded Age train station sits at the summit terminus of what was one of the most important nine miles of railroad in the United States in the 1830s: the Mauch Chunk and Summit Hill Railroad, which later became the Mauch Chunk Switchback Railway. The Victorian building replaced the original offices, becoming one of the first train stations to host travelers. The first documented passenger traffic arrived in the later half of 1827 when the area down to Mauch Chunk, Pennsylvania was known as "the Switzerland of America"; regular passenger trains transported urban tourists from 1829 until early 1932.

This is a list of the earliest railroads in North America, including various railroad-like precursors to the general modern form of a company or government agency operating locomotive-drawn trains on metal tracks.

== Railroad-like entities (1700s–1810s) ==
- 1720: A railroad was reportedly used in the construction of the French fortress in Louisbourg, Nova Scotia, Canada.
- 1764: Between 1762 and 1764, at the close of the French and Indian War, a gravity railroad (mechanized tramway) (Montresor's Tramway) was built by British military engineers up the steep riverside terrain near the Niagara River waterfall's escarpment at the Niagara Portage, which the local Senecas called Crawl on All Fours, in Lewiston, New York. Before the British conquest, under French control the portage had employed nearly 200 Seneca porters. However, once the British took control of the area, they installed a cable railway using sledges (heavy sleds without wheels) to hold the track between the rails. The sleds were capable of carrying 12 to 14 barrels at a time (a serious weight capacity even if only small shoulder-hoistable/mule-compatible keg-sized barrels, taken along with its longevity) indicating that it was a funicular design with two tracks. With barrels as the primary Up load's configuration and they also provided a ready-made counterweight with addition of sufficient Niagara River water as the likely mass used to adjust the lifting force. Designed by Captain John Montresor, the new railway replaced manual labor performed by the Seneca and touched off what might be the first labor rebellion in North America when the Seneca became unemployed; in September 1763, the Senecas revolted and killed many British soldiers and workers in what is called the Devil's Hole Massacre. The tramway was in use until the early 1800s
- 1799–1805: Boston developers began to reduce the height of Mount Vernon before building streets and homes. Silas Whitney constructed a gravity railroad to move excavated material down the hill to fill marshy areas to create new land from the Back Bay. Frederick C. Gamst, a professor of anthropology at the University of Massachusetts, believed this to be the same railroad equipment as used by Bulfinch on his Beacon Hill railway, given the relations of both men to the land speculation syndicate.
- 1809: (Note: Ganst's: No.- 03) A three-quarter-mile wooden tracked railway is built in Nether Providence Township, Pennsylvania by Thomas Leiper to deliver stone from his quarries to market. The track, with a 4-foot (1.2 m) gauge, had a grade of 1½ inches to the yard (1:24 or about 4%) over its total length of 60 yards (54.9 m) and proves satisfactory when tested with a loaded car.

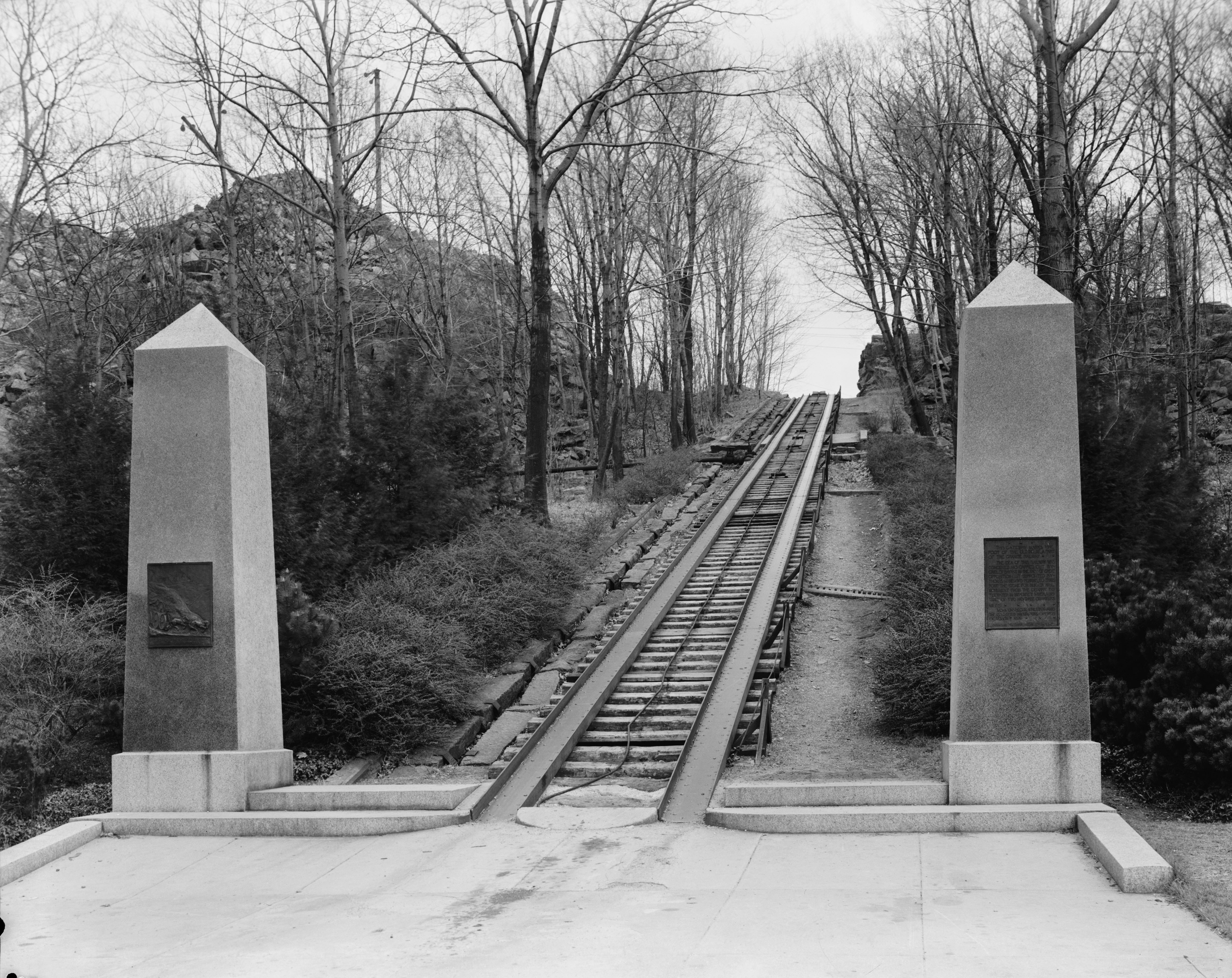
1934 photo of the incline section of the Granite Railway

- 1810: (Note: Ganst's: No.- 04) The animal-powered Leiper Railroad followed after the preceding successful experiment – designed and built by merchant Thomas Leiper, the railway connects Crum Creek to Ridley Creek, in Delaware County, Pennsylvania. It was used until 1829, when it was temporarily replaced by the Leiper Canal, then is reopened to replace the canal in 1852. This became the Crum Creek Branch of the Baltimore and Philadelphia Railroad (part of the Baltimore and Ohio Railroad) in 1887. This is the first railroad meant to be permanent, and the first to evolve into trackage of a common carrier after an intervening closure.See the 1826 Granite Railway (pictured) for comparison.
- 1811: George Magers designed and built a one-mile (1.6 km) wooden gravity railroad between a gunpowder mill and its powder storage bunker at Falling's Creek, Virginia.
- 1815: New Jersey granted a charter on February 6, 1815, for a company to "erect a rail-road from the river Delaware near Trenton, to the river Raritan, at or near New Brunswick"—that is, to connect the water ports so boats could ferry riders the last distance connecting Philadelphia & Trenton to (19th-century) New York City and Brooklyn & Queens on Long Island via New York Harbor, as proposed by inventor and railway builder John Stevens (1749–1838). This New Jersey Railroad Company was the first passenger carrier railroad chartered in the United States, but failed to attract investors and was never built. Its rights would be passed to the Camden and Amboy Railroad (below), chartered in 1830 and also having Stevens as president.
- 1816: A railroad was reportedly used at Kiskiminetas Creek, Pennsylvania.
- 1818: An iron-smelting furnace at Bear Creek, Armstrong County, Pennsylvania, reportedly had a wooden railroad in operation.

== Early railroad companies (1820s–1830s) ==
Granite, coal and cotton railroads

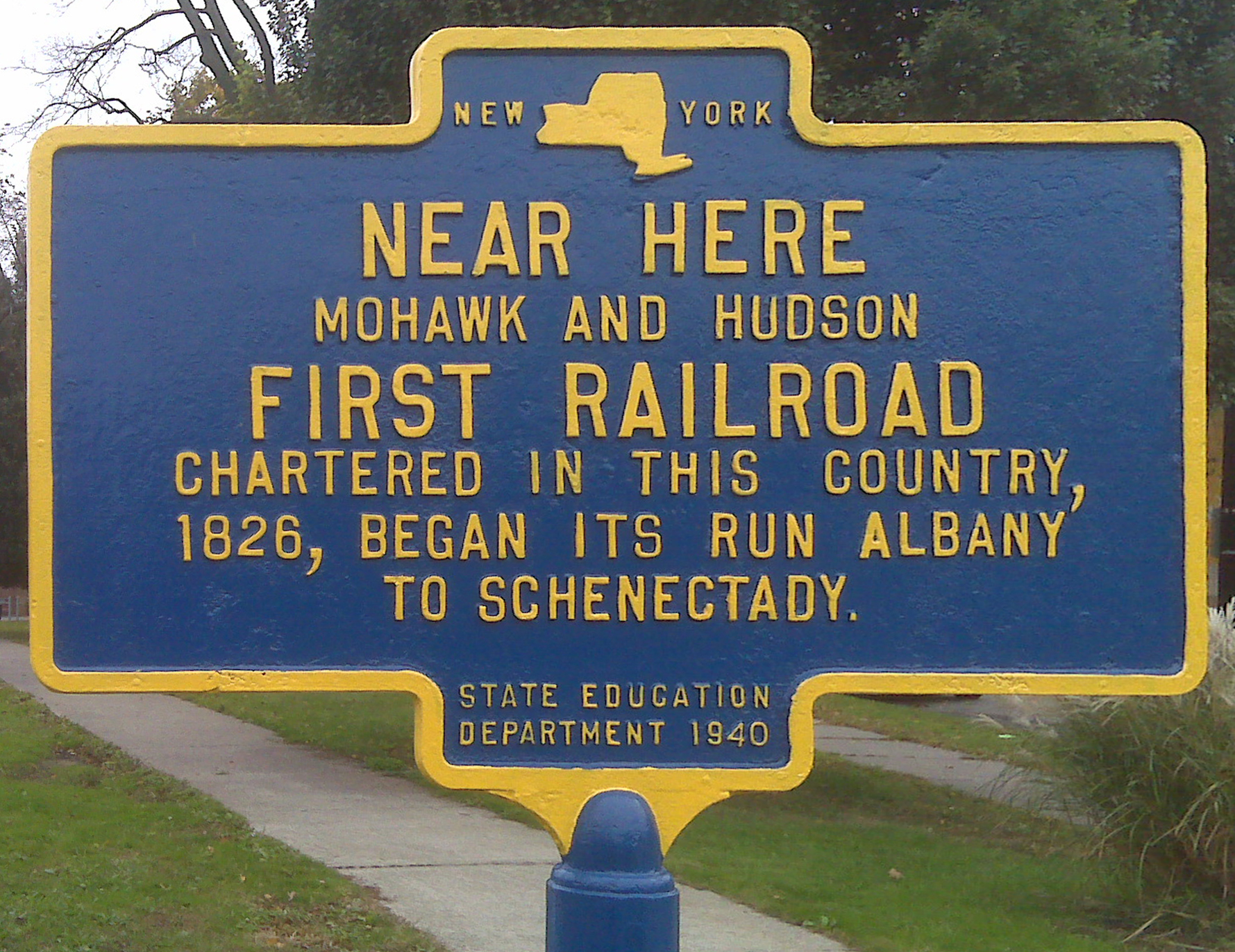
Historical Marker of the Mohawk and Hudson Railroad, incorporated in 1826 and opened in 1831

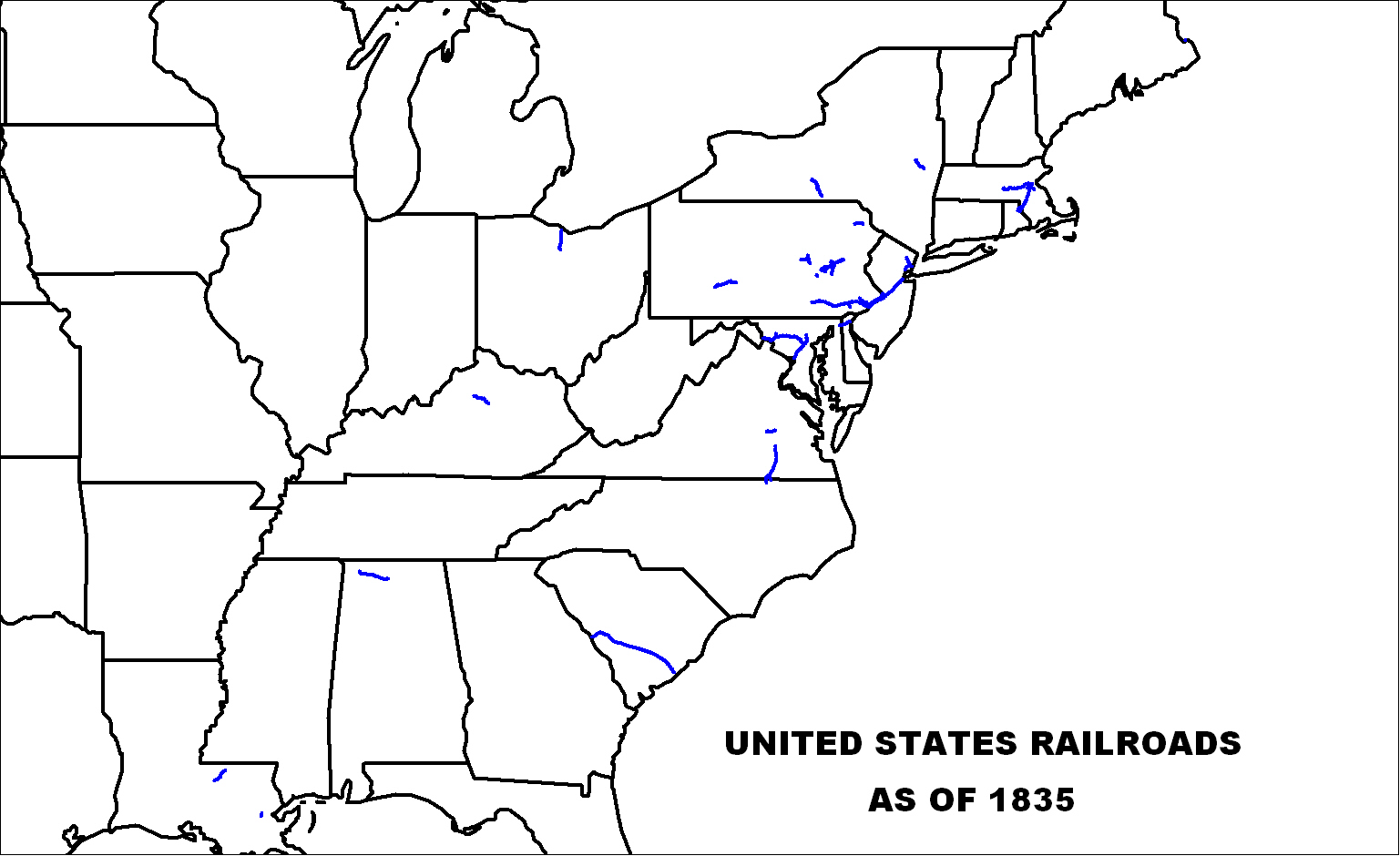
U.S. railroads in 1835

- 1826: The Granite Railway in Massachusetts was incorporated by Thomas Handasyd Perkins and Gridley Bryant. Construction began on April 1, and operations began on October 7. It later became a branch of the Old Colony and Newport Railway, which was later absorbed into the New York, New Haven and Hartford Railroad. This is often called the first commercial railroad in the U.S., as it was the first to evolve into a common carrier without an intervening closure. See the 1810 Leiper Railroad for comparison.
- 1826: On April 9, the Mohawk and Hudson Railroad was incorporated as the first railroad chartered in New York State (marker pictured), and the first railroad in the United States designed to be powered by a locomotive engine as opposed to horse-drawn or gravity railroads. It opened on August 9, 1831, using steam locomotive DeWitt Clinton.
- 1827: The Summit Hill and Mauch Chunk Railroad, often just called The Switchback or the Mauch Chunk Switchback Railroad, Pennsylvania's first railroad and first anthracite carrier initially a 9-mile (14 km) gravity railroad with animal powered return of cars, is built between Summit Hill and Mauch Chunk (now Jim Thorpe), Pennsylvania when rails are laid on top of the existing mule-haul road graded to be nearly uniform in grade from its establishment in 1819–20. Designed by founder Josiah White to drop evenly over its length and superintended in both evolutions by founder Erskine Hazard of the Lehigh Coal & Navigation Company, the railway—as the world's first roller coaster, also became a famous tourist attraction—as were leisure cruises on the company's Lehigh Canal. The road carried cargo as a common carrier back up to Summit Hill almost from the start, but by 1829, the new railed road was carrying passengers flocking out from Philadelphia to enjoy its attractions. It was built to haul anthracite coal from the mines to the Lehigh Canal on the Lehigh River and was the first railroad of this type.
- 1829: On August 8, the Delaware and Hudson Canal Company's gravity railroad in northeast Pennsylvania opened using Stourbridge Lion, the first locomotive to run on rails in the United States. It was also a coal railroad. The canal company, chartered in 1823, referred to itself as "America's oldest continually operated transportation company."
- 1829: The South Carolina Canal and Rail Road Company was chartered December 19, 1827, and was also known as the Charleston & Hamburg Road. An experimental track was installed in February 1829 to haul bales of cotton in downtown Charleston, South Carolina. On April 1, 1830, a double-tracked 3,800-foot-long (1,200 m) railroad was in full operation. By 1833, this railroad had been completed to Hamburg, South Carolina for a total length of 137 miles (220 km). At that time, it was the longest railroad in the world. This was the first railroad to use steam locomotives regularly. It later became part of the Southern Railway, now part of Norfolk Southern.
- 1829: The Mill Creek & Mine Hill Navigation & Railroad Company was chartered on February 7, 1828. The 4.09-mile (6.58 km) main line from Palo Alto, Pennsylvania to Wolf Creek, Pennsylvania was completed in 1829 with branches added in 1829 and 1830 for a total of 8.29 miles (13.34 km). It was another coal hauling railroad.
- 1830: The Schuylkill Valley Navigation and Railroad Company was chartered on April 14, 1828. It ran 9.23 miles (14.85 km) from Port Carbon, Pennsylvania to Tuscarora and was completed in 1830. It was built to carry coal from mines to Port Carbon.
- 1830: The Union Canal Company Railroad was a 3.5-mile (5.6 km) railroad constructed by the Union Canal (Pennsylvania) Company and was chartered on March 3, 1826. The company was in the canal business, but due to the topography, it could not extend its canal to the coal fields north of Pine Grove, Pennsylvania. Its solution was to build this short coal-hauling railroad, which was completed in 1830.
- 1830: The Little Schuylkill Navigation, Railroad and Coal Company was chartered on February 28, 1826. The LSRR operated between Tamaqua, Pennsylvania and Port Clinton beginning in 1831 using horse-drawn cars. Two steam locomotives were acquired by the railroad in 1833; however, the wooden tracks were unable to support the weight of the engines. Iron "T" rails replaced the wooden ones in 1845, and the locomotives were then returned to regular service. It completed a junction with the Catawissa Railroad at Tamanend, also called Little Schuylkill Junction, in 1854. In 1857, the Lehigh South Pennsylvania Railroad (LSRR) built a roundhouse in Tamaqua, housing 21 locomotives and a turntable. In 1863, the company was leased by the Reading Railroad for 93 years. It formally merged with the Reading in 1952.
- 1830: The Tuscumbia Railway was chartered on January 16, 1830, and proceeded to build a 2.1-mile (3.4 km) railroad from downtown Tuscumbia, Alabama to the docks on the Tennessee River west of Sheffield. This was the first railroad chartered/constructed west of the Appalachian Mountains. In 1832, this railroad was renamed the Tuscumbia, Courtland and Decatur Railroad, and was extended 41.9 miles (67.4 km) to connect the two Alabama cities of Tuscumbia and Decatur.
- 1831: The Mount Carbon Railroad was completed in 1831 running from Mount Carbon, Pennsylvania through Pottsville where it split into two branches, one going to what is now Seltzer and the other to the current Wadesville, Pennsylvania. This was a coal-hauling railroad, 6.26 miles (10.07 km) in length.
- 1831: The Mine Hill and Schuylkill Haven Railroad completed the first part of its railroad from Schuylkill Haven, Pennsylvania to Minersville with a branch line up the West Branch of the Schuylkill River, a distance of 13.5 miles (21.7 km).
- 1831: The Room Run Railroad was completed along the path of an unsuccessful gravity road, running a distance 5.26 miles (8.47 km) from Nesquehoning to the Lehigh Canal loading docks at Mauch Chunk, Pennsylvania.
- 1831: The Chesterfield Railroad (sometimes called the Manchester Railroad) began operations by September 1831 in Chesterfield County, Virginia.
- 1836 – Lake Wimico and St. Joseph Canal and Railroad Company – was the first railroad to enter into actual operation in Florida.
- 1837 – Tallahassee – St. Marks Rail Road – was the first railroad "Chartered" in Florida (in 1831), but was the second to be completed and begin cargo-hauling operations.
- 1839: Albion Railway serving coal mines around Stellarton, Nova Scotia, first railway in Canada to use iron rails and run year-round; home of Samson, the oldest surviving locomotive in Canada.

== Early common carriers (1820s–1830s) ==
While private railroads are legally free to choose their jobs and customers, common carriers must charge fair rates to all comers.

Any effort to arrange early common-carrier railroads in chronological order must choose among various possible criterion dates, including applying for a state charter, receiving a charter, forming a company to build a railroad, beginning construction, opening operations, and so forth.

Name	Chartered	State	Opened	Notes
Union Canal Company of Pennsylvania	March 3, 1826	Pennsylvania	1830	Chartered on May 30, 1811, to build a canal; authorized to build a railroad on March 3, 1826
Granite Railway	March 4, 1826	Massachusetts	October 7, 1826	Only authorized to carry freight until April 16, 1846
Delaware and Hudson Canal Company	April 5, 1826	Pennsylvania	October 9, 1829	Chartered on March 13, 1823, to build a canal; authorized to build a railroad on April 5, 1826
Danville and Pottsville Railroad	April 8, 1826	Pennsylvania	September 24, 1834	
Mohawk and Hudson Railroad	April 17, 1826	New York	September 24, 1831	Carried only passengers for first few years of operation due to competition from the adjacent Erie Canal.
Baltimore and Ohio Railroad	February 28, 1827	Maryland	January 7, 1830	First common carrier in the United States, chartered from its inception to haul freight and passengers on timetabled trains over vast distances with steam power, first to open for public service
South Carolina Canal and Railroad Company	December 19, 1827	South Carolina	December 1830	Operated first steam hauled passenger train in the United States on a schedule. Known to the public as the Charleston & Hamburg Railroad.
Ithaca and Owego Railroad	January 28, 1828	New York	April 1, 1834	
Mill Creek and Mine Hill Navigation and Railroad Company	February 7, 1828	Pennsylvania	November 3, 1829	
Tioga Navigation Company	February 7, 1828	Pennsylvania	1839	Chartered on February 20, 1826, to build a canal or slack-water navigation; authorized to build a railroad on February 7, 1828
Baltimore and Susquehanna Railroad	February 13, 1828	Maryland	July 4, 1831	
Chesterfield Railroad	February 27, 1828	Virginia	July 1831	
New Castle and Frenchtown Turnpike and Railroad Company	March 14, 1828	Maryland	February 28, 1832	Chartered on January 6, 1810, as the New Castle and Frenchtown Turnpike Company to build a turnpike; renamed and authorized to build a railroad on March 14, 1828
Philadelphia and Columbia Railroad	March 24, 1828	Pennsylvania	October 18, 1832	Part of the state-owned Main Line of Public Works
Schuylkill Valley Navigation Company	April 14, 1828	Pennsylvania	1830	Chartered on March 20, 1827, to build a canal; authorized to build a railroad on April 14, 1828; renamed Schuylkill Valley Navigation and Railroad Company on January 15, 1829
Schuylkill East Branch Navigation Company	April 14, 1828	Pennsylvania	November 18, 1831	Chartered on February 20, 1826, to build a lock navigation; authorized to build a railroad on April 14, 1828; renamed Little Schuylkill Navigation, Railroad and Coal Company on April 23, 1829
Mine Hill and Schuylkill Haven Railroad	April 15, 1829	Pennsylvania	April 1831	
Northern Liberties and Penn Township Railroad	April 23, 1829	Pennsylvania	April 1834	
Mount Carbon Railroad	July 15, 1829	Pennsylvania	1831	
Tuscumbia Railway	January 15, 1830	Alabama	June 12, 1832	
Pontchartrain Railroad	January 20, 1830	Louisiana	April 23, 1831	
Lexington and Ohio Railroad	January 27, 1830	Kentucky	August 15, 1832	
Camden and Amboy Railroad and Transportation Company	February 4, 1830	New Jersey	October 1, 1832	
Petersburg Railroad	February 10, 1830	Virginia	October 1832	
Lykens Valley Railroad and Coal Company	April 7, 1830	Pennsylvania	April 1834	
Beaver Meadow Railroad and Coal Company	April 7, 1830	Pennsylvania	November 5, 1836	
Canajoharie and Catskill Railroad	April 19, 1830	New York	1839	
Boston and Lowell Railroad	June 5, 1830	Massachusetts	June 24, 1835	
Petersburg Railroad	January 1, 1831	North Carolina	1833	
Paterson and Hudson River Railroad	January 31, 1831	New Jersey	1834	
Elizabethtown and Somerville Railroad	February 9, 1831	New Jersey	August 13, 1836	
Saratoga and Schenectady Railroad	February 16, 1831	New York	July 12, 1832	
West Chester Railroad	February 18, 1831	Pennsylvania	October 1, 1832	
West Feliciana Railroad	March 5, 1831	Louisiana	January 1835	
Philadelphia and Columbia Railroad	March 21, 1831	Pennsylvania	March 18, 1834	Part of the state-owned Main Line of Public Works
Southwark Railroad	April 2, 1831	Pennsylvania	1835	
Cumberland Valley Railroad	April 2, 1831	Pennsylvania	August 16, 1837	
Philadelphia and Delaware County Railroad	April 2, 1831	Pennsylvania	January 17, 1838	Renamed Philadelphia, Wilmington and Baltimore Railroad on March 14, 1836
Philadelphia, Germantown and Norristown Railroad	April 5, 1831	Pennsylvania	June 6, 1832	First common carrier in Pennsylvania. Earlier railroads were operated to haul minerals like coal and iron, but later in the decade would become modern common carrier systems hauling passengers and public goods.
Winchester and Potomac Railroad	April 8, 1831	Virginia (now partially West Virginia)	March 1836	
New York and Harlem Railroad	April 25, 1831	New York	November 26, 1832	
Boston and Providence Railroad	July 22, 1831	Massachusetts	July 28, 1835	
Boston and Worcester Railroad	June 23, 1831	Massachusetts	April 16, 1834	
Clinton and Vicksburg Railroad	December 19, 1831	Mississippi	May 15, 1838	Reorganized by the Commercial and Railroad Bank of Vicksburg on 25 December 1833. Reorganized on 9 March 1850 as the Vicksburg and Jackson Railroad. Reorganized in January 1857 as the Southern Railroad of Mississippi. Reorganized on 28 January 1867 as the Vicksburg and Meridian Railroad. On 22 October 1885, the five foot gauge of the entire line from Meridian to Vicksburg, 152 miles including sidings, was changed to standard gauge of 4 feet 6 inches in about 16 hours. From 1889 the Meridian-Vicksburg Railway line was known as the Alabama & Vicksburg Railway line of the Queen and Crescent Route.
Mad River and Lake Erie Railroad	January 5, 1832	Ohio	1838	
Tuscumbia, Courtland and Decatur Railroad	January 13, 1832	Alabama	August 20, 1833	
Wilmington and Susquehanna Railroad	January 18, 1832	Delaware	July 14, 1837	
Lawrenceburg and Indianapolis Railroad	February 2, 1832	Indiana	July 4, 1834	
Ohio and Indianapolis Railroad	February 3, 1832	Indiana	1851	Renamed Jeffersonville Railroad on February 3, 1849
Philadelphia and Trenton Railroad	February 23, 1832	Pennsylvania	November 14, 1833	
Baltimore and Port Deposit Railroad	March 5, 1832	Maryland	July 6, 1837	
New Jersey Railroad and Transportation Company	March 7, 1832	New Jersey	September 15, 1834	
Portsmouth and Roanoke Railroad	March 8, 1832	Virginia	July 27, 1834	
New Jersey, Hudson and Delaware Railroad	March 8, 1832	New Jersey	1872	Merged into the New Jersey Midland Railway on April 26, 1870
Franklin Railroad	March 12, 1832	Pennsylvania	September 10, 1839	
Delaware and Maryland Railroad	March 14, 1832	Maryland	July 14, 1837	Merged into the Wilmington and Susquehanna Railroad on April 18, 1836
York and Maryland Line Railroad	March 14, 1832	Pennsylvania	August 23, 1838	
Liggett's Gap Railroad	April 7, 1832	Pennsylvania	October 20, 1851	Renamed Lackawanna and Western Railroad on April 14, 1851
Rensselaer and Saratoga Railroad	April 14, 1832	New York	April 19, 1836	
Saratoga and Fort Edward Railroad	April 17, 1832	New York	October 15, 1848	Reorganized as the Saratoga and Washington Railroad on May 2, 1834
New York and Albany Railroad	April 17, 1832	New York	December 31, 1848	Sold to the New York and Harlem Railroad on March 9, 1846
Watertown and Rome Railroad	April 17, 1832	New York	October 1849	
Tonawanda Railroad	April 24, 1832	New York	May 1837	
New York and Erie Railroad	April 24, 1832	New York	September 23, 1841	
Brooklyn and Jamaica Railroad	April 25, 1832	New York	April 18, 1836	Leased by the Long Island Rail Road from opening
Hudson and Berkshire Railroad	April 26, 1832	New York	September 26, 1838	
Boston, Norwich and New London Railroad	May 1, 1832	Connecticut	1840	Merged into the Norwich and Worcester Railroad on June 22, 1836
New York and Stonington Railroad	May 14, 1832	Connecticut	November 17, 1837	Merged into the New York, Providence and Boston Railroad on July 1, 1833
Portsmouth and Lancaster Railroad	June 9, 1832	Pennsylvania	September 16, 1836	Renamed Harrisburg, Portsmouth, Mountjoy and Lancaster Railroad on March 11, 1835
Williamsport and Elmira Railroad	June 9, 1832	Pennsylvania	January 12, 1837	
Strasburg Rail Road	June 9, 1832	Pennsylvania	1837	Still in operation as a shortline freight hauler and tourist railroad. Recognized as the oldest, continuously operating railroad in the United States as it still operates under its original 1832 charter.
New York, Providence and Boston Railroad	June 23, 1832	Rhode Island	November 17, 1837	
Detroit and St. Joseph Railroad	June 29, 1832	Michigan	February 3, 1838	Sold to the Central Railroad of Michigan on April 22, 1837

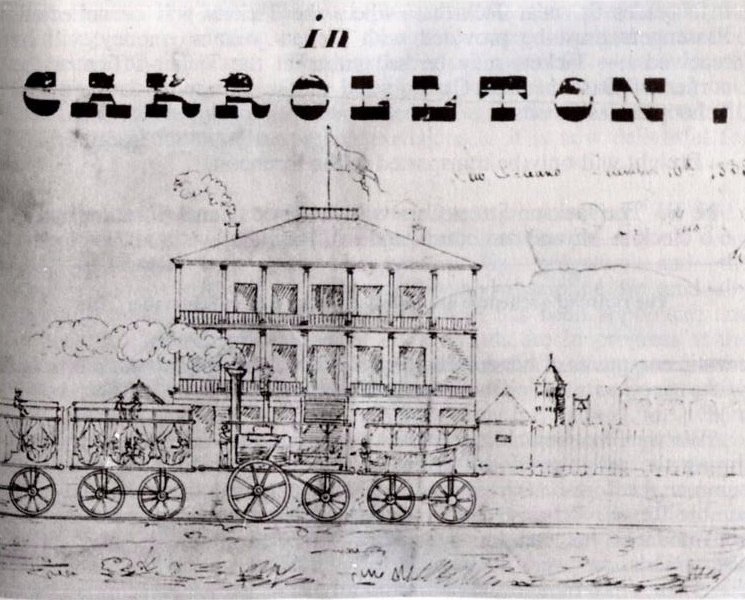
The New Orleans and Carrollton Railroad in 1835

Selected railroads chartered since 1832:

- 1835: The New Orleans and Carrollton Railroad began operation after four years of work; rail route still in operation as the St. Charles Streetcar Line in New Orleans.
- 1836: The Lake Wimico and St. Joseph Canal and Railroad Company was the first steam railroad in Florida, opening on September 5.
- 1836: The Champlain and St. Lawrence Railroad opened in Quebec, Canada.
- 1838: The Northern Cross Railroad opens in Central Illinois; to this day, part of the NCR still operates under the Norfolk Southern Railway.

== Tunnels and bridges ==
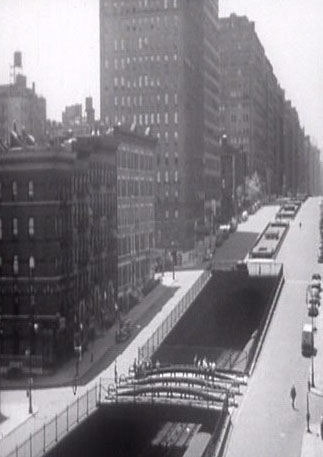
The expanded Park Avenue Tunnel in 1941

- 1829: Carrollton Viaduct built of stone for Baltimore & Ohio Railroad, 312 ft (95 m) over Gwynns Falls River in Baltimore, Maryland
- 1831 Farnsworth Avenue Stone Arch Carriage Bridge over the Camden & Amboy RR. Bordentown NJ: First bridge completed over Stevens' newly designed rolled iron inverted T-rails made in Wales. Today trains still pass under the arch on new rails of similar design. Roadway is still used above the stone arch. Designed by Wilson. Keystone date 1831. Made of Stockton Sandstone
- 1833 (June): The Staple Bend Tunnel, the first railroad tunnel in the U.S., completed in June 1833 as part of the Allegheny Portage Railroad which opened in March 1834. Trains stopped running through the Staple Bend Tunnel in 1857, and it is now part of the Allegheny Portage Railroad National Historic Site.
- 1833 (December): Wadesville Tunnel, built by Danville and Pottsville Railroad at Wadesville, Pennsylvania.
- 1835: Thomas Viaduct built of stone for Baltimore & Ohio Railroad, 614 ft (187 m) over Patapsco River in Relay, Maryland
- 1835: Canton Viaduct built of stone for Boston & Providence Railroad, 615 ft (187 m), over Canton River in Canton, Massachusetts
- 1837: The Yorkville Tunnel opened on October 26, for the New York and Harlem Railroad. It was absorbed in the 1870s by the longer and wider Park Avenue Tunnel, and is used by all Metro-North Railroad commuter trains. The old tunnel carries the two center tracks, and two new tunnels carry outer tracks.
- 1837: The Taft Tunnel opened in 1837 for Norwich and Worcester Railroad in Lisbon, Connecticut, north of Norwich, Connecticut. This is the oldest tunnel still in use in its original form in the U.S.
- 1837: The Howard Tunnel in York County, Pennsylvania. Considered the second-oldest tunnel still in use in its original form in the U.S.
- 1842: The Potomac Creek Bridge, 400 ft (120 m) long, was built across the Potomac Creek in Stafford County, Virginia.
- 1848: Starrucca Viaduct built of stone for the Erie Railroad 1,040 ft (320 m) over Starrucca Creek in Lanesboro, Pennsylvania
- 1850: The Henryton Tunnel on the Baltimore and Ohio Railroad.
- 1850: The Chetoogeta Mountain Tunnel on the Western and Atlantic Railroad, Tunnel Hill, Georgia. 1,477 feet long and the first major railroad tunnel in the south.
- 1856: The Blue Ridge Tunnel, 4,263 ft (1,299 m), considered a world marvel of engineering when opened.
- 1872: The Hauto Tunnel 3,800 ft (1,200 m) enabled a saving of over 14.5 miles (23.3 km), most (12.5 miles (20.1 km)) with steep grades, of the former Nesquehoning & Mahanoy Railroad for the several millions of tons/annum of anthracite shipped by the Lehigh Coal & Navigation Company from its Lansford and Coaldale breakers in the Panther Creek Valley. The tunnel allowed retirement and conversion of the famous Switchback Railroad (the Summit Hill & Mauch Chunk Railroad) into a tourism-only railroad owned by the Mauch Chunk, Summit Hill Switch-Back Railway Company

== West of the Mississippi River ==
- 1841: The Red River Railroad between Alexandria and Cheneyville in Louisiana was operational by 1841.
- 1852: The first section of the Pacific Railroad, later part of the Missouri Pacific Railroad, opened near St. Louis, Missouri.

== See also ==
- History of rail transport in Canada
- History of rail transport in the United States
- Rail transport in Mexico#History
