= Danville and Pottsville Railroad =

Overview
- Locale: Central Pennsylvania

History
- Opened: 1831
- Closed: 1842

Technical
- Line length: 13 mi (21 km)
- Track gauge: 1,435 mm (4 ft 8 1/2 in)
- Electrification: None

The Danville and Pottsville Railroad (D&P) was an early anthracite coal railroad constructed in central Pennsylvania during the 1830s. Promoters envisioned the D&P as a means to move anthracite westward from the coal fields around Pottsville to the Susquehanna at Sunbury for further shipment downstream via state canals. It was among the earliest attempts in the United States to establish a rail connection between the anthracite coal regions and eastern markets using fixed-track rail transport. Sections of the road opened from 1834 to 1838, but financial constraints, engineering difficulties, and the rise of competing lines prevented full realization of the original plan, and what lasted was folded into the Pennsylvania Railroad system. Although never completed to its intended scope, the D&P project would have a lasting impact in the development of railroads in Pennsylvania.

== Construction and engineering ==
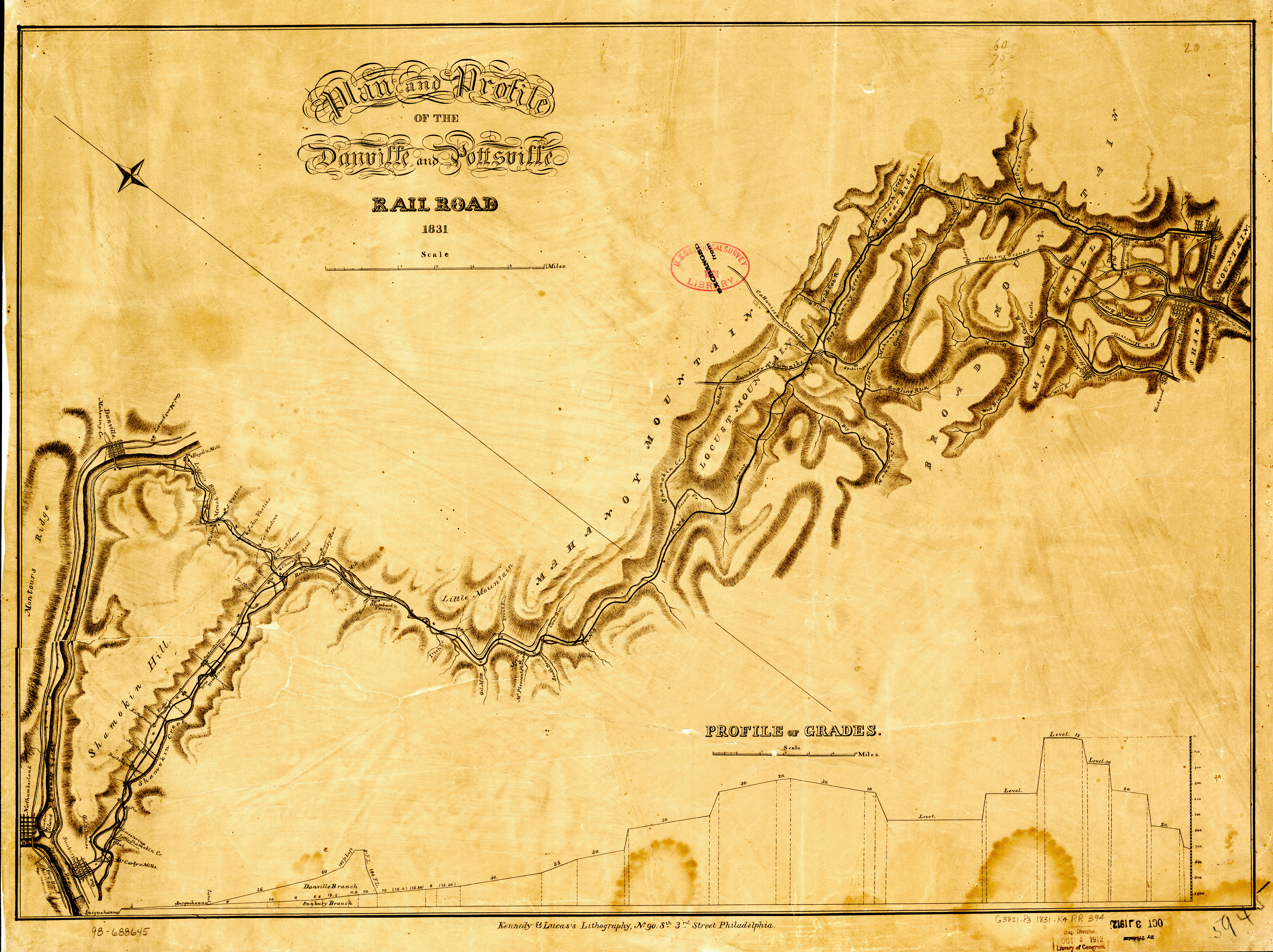
1831 Danville and Pottsville railroad

At the time of its charter in 1826, Danville provided access to the West Branch of the Susquehanna River and served as a planned junction in the Pennsylvania canal system. It was under these auspices that the D&P was chartered, intent to link the Schuylkill and the Susquehanna, but in time, as the company saw opportunity in the then-untapped route to Sunbury, other companies were chartered to take the route to Danville, and the D&P changed from its original intended terminus to Sunbury. The intended final route then would have stretched northward from a junction with the East Branch of the Mount Carbon Railroad, through Minersville, Ashland, and Mount Carmel before descending along the Shamokin Creek to the Susquehanna near Sunbury. The railroad’s alignment reflected an early internal improvements logic that prioritized inter-regional connections and waterborne trade routes, rather than direct access to Philadelphia.

In 1831, construction began on the first segment of the line, from the junction at Wadesville to Girardville. This section included six inclined planes, a rare and ambitious feature for the time. Four ascended and two descended, and all were double-tracked to permit simultaneous haulage and descent. Some planes used stationary steam engines to assist with grades. One such plane near Pottsville was curved and featured iron-capped rails to reduce wear. Also included on the road was the second railroad tunnel in all of the United States, the Wadesville Tunnel, extending from the first plane at Wadesville to St. Clair, constructed from 1831 to 1833.

Revenue service on this section of the Danville and Pottsville Railroad commenced in 1834. The easternmost section, constructed with far less ambition required, opened from Sunbury to Paxinos in November 1835, and thence to Shamokin in 1838.

== Fate ==
Almost immediately after opening, the insufficiency of the infrastructure on the eastern segment was readily apparent. The Mahanoy plane, the largest plane descending from Frackville, was intended to be powered by counterbalancing cars with cars filled with water, but at its first demonstration, they proved insufficient at providing enough energy to balance the system, and soon thereafter the plane was powered by steam engine. Even so, the challenges of the planes were never overcome, and service on the line was ended in 1836. By 1838, the physical condition of the line had already deteriorated. Portions near Girardville and Ashland were incomplete or abandoned. Structural settling was so severe that wooden shoring had to be added to the original masonry piers. It wasn't long after the line was abandoned that the bed of the road from Frackville to St. Clair was turned into a public road; this eventually evolved into modern-day PA 61. The Wadesville Tunnel was eventually consumed by strip mining.

The section from Shamokin to Sunbury had a more successful fate. Unencumbered by the technical challenges of its eastern counterpart, the road remained in service long after construction, and the road outlasted the company that constructed it, being sold after the D&P Co. went bankrupt. After reorganizing in 1851 as the Philadelphia and Sunbury Railroad, this new company re-laid the line with T-rail and reopened the line in 1853, extending it to Mount Carmel in 1855. A second foreclosure and reorganization led to the Shamokin Valley and Pottsville Railroad in 1858, which finally completed a link between the Susquehanna and the Schuylkill via a connection to a new link in the Mine Hill and Schuylkill Haven Railroad in 1860. This company was soon folded into the Pennsylvania Railroad system, first via the Philadelphia and Erie, and then the Northern Central. In 1862, what was left of the eastern section was sold to the Philadelphia and Reading Railroad. The western section lived on for another century before passenger service ended in 1963.

Although later eclipsed by larger systems such as the Philadelphia and Reading and the Pennsylvania, the Danville and Pottsville Railroad remains a valuable example of early American railroading, illustrating both the technological ambition and organizational limitations that characterized pre-1840 rail ventures. Though never completed to its intended scope, the D&P "was not just another failed early railroad project" but rather a distinctive venture in which "ambition, topographical challenge, and private initiative intersected in a formative experiment," with engineers who would later play key roles in Pennsylvania's rail system.
