= Mount Carbon Railroad =

Map

The Mt. Carbon Railroad (MC) was one of what was known as lateral railroads (another term for branch railroads) built in Schuylkill County, Pennsylvania in the 1820s and 1830s, and which were first constructed to accommodate the Schuylkill Canal with coal produced from the coal district south of the Mine Hill and east of the West Branch Schuylkill River, covering an area of between sixty and seventy square miles. The MC opened on April 19, 1831, between the settlement of Mount Carbon, Pennsylvania, on the Schuylkill Canal, north to the Norwegian Creek confluence, and following that tributary to beyond both the East and West Norwegian Creeks. In 1842, the Philadelphia and Reading Railway Company (P&RR) made Mt. Carbon a termination point for its railroad line from Philadelphia in direct competition with the Schuylkill Canal. The P&RR leased the MC on May 16, 1862, and merged it into the parent organization on June 13, 1872.

== Development ==
The company was authorized by the legislature of Pennsylvania as the Norwegian Creek Slackwater Company, on April 14, 1827. Subsequently, when railroads began to replace canals, the company became the Mt. Carbon Railroad on April 29, 1829.

The MC extended from the navigation (canal) at Mt. Carbon (south of Pottsville) to the confluence of the Norwegian Creek and then followed that tributary to the numerous coal mines northwest of Pottsville. It extended in a Y-shaped configuration, about two miles up each branch of Norwegian Creek towards Mine Hill – to the Mt. Laffee area in the west and Wadesville in the East, all through coal deposits.

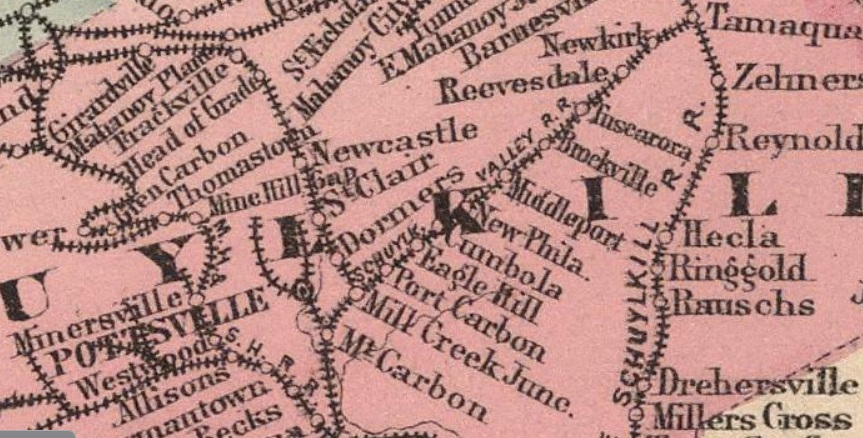
The Mount Carbon Railroad shown in an 1877 map with its distinctive Y configuration between Mt. Carbon and Mine Hill through Pottsville. At this time the MC was already merged into the Philadelphia and Reading Company.

This railroad had a common gauge of 56 1/2 inches and was built in a more substantial manner than either the Mill Creek or Schuylkill Valley railroads (which predated it). The first three miles along the Schuylkill River were double track, and the balance single track arranged to accommodate substantial traffic. Engineer William R. Hopkins began construction during October of 1829. The Company was under the corporate presidency of John R. White, a mine owner and operator since 1821, whose mines were located on the west branch of this railroad.

In 1832, the line was equipped with wood and strap rails. There were three 6 in × 4 in (150 mm × 100 mm) oak tracks on the canal docks, while the traffic bearing line coming down Norwegian Creek had 6 in × 10 in (150 mm × 250 mm) white oak and pine rails, 16 feet long, capped with iron. Ties, on 8-foot (2.4 m) centers, rested on 2-inch (51 mm) oak blocks set at right angles to the rail. The light up-track had 6 in × 8 in (150 mm × 200 mm) rails. The 3-mile (4.8 km) average haul delivered, in 1832, 57,234 short tons (51,922 t) of anthracite to the Schuylkill Navigation Canal at Mt. Carbon.

Rolling stock consisted of 150 cars of one ton capacity. The Mt. Carbon Railroad was about 4 miles long; the average distance of hauling on its tracks was about 3 miles.

== Successor railroads ==
The MC was the entrance for the Danville & Pottsville Railroad (1826) from the Mahanoy Valley, built in 1834 (at Wadesville), and the P&RR to Pottsville when in 1842, the P&RR had made Mt. Carbon a termination point of its main railroad line from Philadelphia in direct competition with the Schuylkill Canal. The canal company was leased by the railroad in 1870, and the canal north of Port Clinton was abandoned at the signing of the lease.

In about 1848, iron T-rail replaced the wood and strap rail, but mule power, other than on the section used by the P&RR, prevailed until 1862. A switchback at Mt. Laffee linked Beechwood Colliery, in 1868–69, with the line on the west branch of Norwegian Creek.

The P&RR leased the Mt. Carbon on May 16, 1862, and merged the line into the parent organization on June 13, 1872, in which year trackage was the same as in the 1830s (except for material), seven miles, with four double/racked. Many branches to collieries were built, but MC never extended the main lines beyond their original chartered limits. Coal traffic through stripping operation caused the east branch to be rebuilt after World War II. The Danville & Pottsville Railroad tunnel and its Plane 1 above Wadesville disappeared in the renovation.

== Related articles ==
- Mahanoy Creek & Valley
- Oldest railroads in North America
- Pottsville, Pennsylvania
- Schuylkill County, Pennsylvania
- West Branch Schuylkill River
