= List of United States Supreme Court cases, volume 228 =

Supreme Court of the United States
- Interactive map of Supreme Court of the United States
- 38°53′26″N 77°00′16″W
- Established: March 4, 1789; 236 years ago
- Location: Washington, D.C.
- Coordinates: 38°53′26″N 77°00′16″W
- Composition method: Presidential nomination with Senate confirmation
- Authorised by: Constitution of the United States, Art. III, § 1
- Judge term length: life tenure, subject to impeachment and removal
- Number of positions: 9 (by statute)
- Website: supremecourt.gov

This is a list of cases reported in volume 228 of United States Reports, decided by the Supreme Court of the United States in 1913.

== Justices of the Supreme Court at the time of volume 228 U.S. ==
The Supreme Court is established by Article III, Section 1 of the Constitution of the United States, which says: "The judicial Power of the United States, shall be vested in one supreme Court . . .". The size of the Court is not specified; the Constitution leaves it to Congress to set the number of justices. Under the Judiciary Act of 1789 Congress originally fixed the number of justices at six (one chief justice and five associate justices). Since 1789 Congress has varied the size of the Court from six to seven, nine, ten, and back to nine justices (always including one chief justice).

When the cases in volume 228 were decided the Court comprised the following nine members:

Portrait	Justice	Office	Home State	Succeeded	Date confirmed by the Senate (Vote)	Tenure on Supreme Court
	Edward Douglass White	Chief Justice	Louisiana	Melville Fuller	December 12, 1910 (Acclamation)	December 19, 1910 – May 19, 1921 (Died)
	Joseph McKenna	Associate Justice	California	Stephen Johnson Field	January 21, 1898 (Acclamation)	January 26, 1898 – January 5, 1925 (Retired)
	Oliver Wendell Holmes Jr.	Associate Justice	Massachusetts	Horace Gray	December 4, 1902 (Acclamation)	December 8, 1902 – January 12, 1932 (Retired)
	William R. Day	Associate Justice	Ohio	George Shiras Jr.	February 23, 1903 (Acclamation)	March 2, 1903 – November 13, 1922 (Retired)
	Horace Harmon Lurton	Associate Justice	Tennessee	Rufus W. Peckham	December 20, 1909 (Acclamation)	January 3, 1910 – July 12, 1914 (Died)
	Charles Evans Hughes	Associate Justice	New York	David Josiah Brewer	May 2, 1910 (Acclamation)	October 10, 1910 – June 10, 1916 (Resigned)
	Willis Van Devanter	Associate Justice	Wyoming	Edward Douglass White (as Associate Justice)	December 15, 1910 (Acclamation)	January 3, 1911 – June 2, 1937 (Retired)
	Joseph Rucker Lamar	Associate Justice	Georgia	William Henry Moody	December 15, 1910 (Acclamation)	January 3, 1911 – January 2, 1916 (Died)
	Mahlon Pitney	Associate Justice	New Jersey	John Marshall Harlan	March 13, 1912 (50–26)	March 18, 1912 – December 31, 1922 (Resigned)

== Citation style ==
Under the Judiciary Act of 1789 the federal court structure at the time comprised District Courts, which had general trial jurisdiction; Circuit Courts, which had mixed trial and appellate (from the US District Courts) jurisdiction; and the United States Supreme Court, which had appellate jurisdiction over the federal District and Circuit courts—and for certain issues over state courts. The Supreme Court also had limited original jurisdiction (i.e., in which cases could be filed directly with the Supreme Court without first having been heard by a lower federal or state court). There were one or more federal District Courts and/or Circuit Courts in each state, territory, or other geographical region.

The Judiciary Act of 1891 created the United States Courts of Appeals and reassigned the jurisdiction of most routine appeals from the district and circuit courts to these appellate courts. The Act created nine new courts that were originally known as the "United States Circuit Courts of Appeals." The new courts had jurisdiction over most appeals of lower court decisions. The Supreme Court could review either legal issues that a court of appeals certified or decisions of court of appeals by writ of certiorari.

On January 1, 1912, the effective date of the Judicial Code of 1911, the old Circuit Courts were abolished, with their remaining trial court jurisdiction transferred to the U.S. District Courts.

Bluebook citation style is used for case names, citations, and jurisdictions.

- "# Cir." = United States Court of Appeals
  - e.g., "3d Cir." = United States Court of Appeals for the Third Circuit
- "C.C.D." = United States Circuit Court for the District of . . .
  - e.g.,"C.C.D.N.J." = United States Circuit Court for the District of New Jersey
- "D." = United States District Court for the District of . . .
  - e.g.,"D. Mass." = United States District Court for the District of Massachusetts
- "E." = Eastern; "M." = Middle; "N." = Northern; "S." = Southern; "W." = Western
  - e.g.,"C.C.S.D.N.Y." = United States Circuit Court for the Southern District of New York
  - e.g.,"M.D. Ala." = United States District Court for the Middle District of Alabama
- "Ct. Cl." = United States Court of Claims
- The abbreviation of a state's name alone indicates the highest appellate court in that state's judiciary at the time.
  - e.g.,"Pa." = Supreme Court of Pennsylvania
  - e.g.,"Me." = Supreme Judicial Court of Maine

== List of cases in volume 228 U.S. ==
Case Name	Page & year	Opinion of the Court	Concurring opinion(s)	Dissenting opinion(s)	Lower Court	Disposition
Abilene Nat'l Bank v. Dolley	1 (1913)	Holmes	none	none	C.C.D. Kan.	affirmed
United States ex rel. Knight v. Lane	6 (1913)	VanDevanter	none	none	D.C. Cir.	affirmed
United States v. George	14 (1913)	McKenna	none	none	D. Neb.	affirmed
The Fair v. Kohler D. & S. Co.	22 (1913)	Holmes	none	none	C.C.N.D. Ill.	affirmed
Friend v. Talcott	27 (1913)	White	none	none	7th Cir.	affirmed
Plested v. Abbey	42 (1913)	White	none	none	C.C.D. Colo.	affirmed
United States v. Anderson	52 (1913)	White	none	none	D. Or.	reversed
Metropolis T. Co. v. City of Chicago	61 (1913)	McKenna	none	none	Ill.	affirmed
Chicago et al. R.R. v. Cram	70 (1913)	McKenna	none	none	Neb.	affirmed
Chicago et al. R.R. v. Kyle	85 (1913)	McKenna	none	none	Neb.	affirmed
United States v. Pacific et al. Co.	87 (1913)	McKenna	none	none	D. Alaska	reversed
Frosch v. Walter	109 (1913)	Holmes	Pitney	none	D.C. Cir.	reversed
McDermott v. Wisconsin	115 (1913)	Day	none	none	Wis.	reversed
Bogart v. Southern P.R.R. Co.	137 (1913)	Day	none	none	C.C.E.D.N.Y.	dismissed
Ettor v. City of Tacoma	148 (1913)	Lurton	none	none	Wash.	reversed
United States v. Reading Co.	158 (1913)	Lurton	none	none	C.C.E.D. Pa.	mandate modified
Houghton v. Burden	161 (1913)	Lurton	none	none	2d Cir.	affirmed
Gulf et al. R.R. Co. v. McGinnis	173 (1913)	Lurton	none	none	Tex. App.	reversed
Santa Fe et al. R.R. Co. v. Grant Bros. C. Co.	177 (1913)	Hughes	none	none	Ariz.	reversed
G.A. Fuller Co. v. McCloskey	194 (1913)	Hughes	none	none	D.C. Cir.	affirmed
Hebert v. Crawford	204 (1913)	Lamar	none	none	5th Cir.	reversed
Lyle v. Patterson	211 (1913)	Lamar	none	none	8th Cir.	affirmed
Wilson v. Snow	217 (1913)	Lamar	none	none	D.C. Cir.	affirmed
Pico v. United States	225 (1913)	Lamar	none	none	Phil.	affirmed
Sweeney v. Erving	233 (1913)	Pitney	none	none	D.C. Cir.	affirmed
Donnelly v. United States	243 (1913)	Pitney	none	Holmes	C.C.N.D. Cal.	affirmed
McLaughlin Bros. v. Hallowell	278 (1913)	Pitney	none	none	Iowa	dismissed
McCoach v. Minehill et al. R.R. Co.	295 (1913)	Pitney	none	Day	3d Cir.	affirmed
McGowan v. Parish	312 (1913)	White	none	none	D.C. Cir.	appeal allowed
Texas & P.R.R. Co. v. Harvey	319 (1913)	Day	none	none	5th Cir.	affirmed
Consolidated T. Co. v. Norfolk et al. R.R. Co.	326 (1913)	Lurton	none	none	Va.	dismissed
Sy Joc Lieng v. Sy Quia	335 (1913)	VanDevanter	none	none	Phil.	affirmed
Rexford v. Brunswick B.C. Co.	339 (1913)	VanDevanter	none	none	4th Cir.	reversed
Michigan T. Co. v. Ferry	346 (1913)	Holmes	none	none	8th Cir.	reversed
Texas & P.R.R. Co. v. Stewart	357 (1913)	Day	none	none	5th Cir.	affirmed
Slocum v. New York L. Ins. Co.	364 (1913)	VanDevanter	none	Hughes	3d Cir.	affirmed
Ex parte Dante	429 (1913)	White	none	none	D.C. Cir.	mandamus denied
Seaboard A.L.R.R. Co. v. Moore	433 (1913)	White	none	none	5th Cir.	affirmed
Jordan v. Roche	436 (1913)	McKenna	none	none	2d Cir.	certification
Bradford v. United States	446 (1913)	McKenna	none	none	Ct. Cl.	affirmed
Madera W.W. v. Madera	454 (1913)	Holmes	none	none	C.C.S.D. Cal.	affirmed
Johnson v. United States	457 (1913)	Holmes	none	none	E.D. Pa.	affirmed
Burlingham v. Crouse	459 (1913)	Day	none	none	2d Cir.	affirmed
Everett v. Judson	474 (1913)	Day	none	none	2d Cir.	affirmed
Andrews v. Partridge	479 (1913)	Day	none	none	3d Cir.	reversed
Northern P.R.R. Co. v. Boyd	482 (1913)	Lamar	none	Lurton	9th Cir.	affirmed
Ex parte First Nat'l Bank	516 (1913)	White	none	none	D.C. Cir.	mandamus denied
Union Tr. Co. v. Westhus	519 (1913)	White	none	none	C.C.E.D. Mo.	dismissed
United States v. Chavez	525 (1913)	White	none	none	W.D. Tex.	reversed
United States v. Mesa	533 (1913)	White	none	none	W.D. Tex.	reversed
Clarke v. Rogers	534 (1913)	McKenna	none	none	1st Cir.	affirmed
Tiaco v. Forbes	549 (1913)	Holmes	none	none	Phil.	affirmed
Chicago et al. R.R. Co. v. Hackett	559 (1913)	Lurton	none	none	Ill. App. Ct.	affirmed
Title et al. Co. v. United States ex rel. Harlan	567 (1913)	White	none	none	C.C.M.D. Pa.	affirmed
Adams v. City of Milwaukee	572 (1913)	McKenna	none	none	Wis.	affirmed
Bugajewitz v. Adams	585 (1913)	Holmes	none	none	D. Colo.	affirmed
Schwartz v. Adams	592 (1913)	Holmes	none	none	D. Colo.	affirmed
Norfolk & W.R.R. Co. v. Dixie T. Co.	593 (1913)	Holmes	none	none	Va.	affirmed
Consolidated T. Co. v. Norfolk & O.V.R.R. Co.	596 (1913)	Lurton	none	none	Va.	rehearing denied
Bailey v. Sanders	603 (1913)	VanDevanter	none	none	9th Cir.	affirmed
Lewis P. Co. v. Wyman	610 (1913)	Pitney	none	none	8th Cir.	affirmed
Southern P.R.R. Co. v. United States	618 (1913)	White	none	none	9th Cir.	affirmed
Merchants Nat'l Bank v. Sexton	634 (1913)	White	none	none	2d Cir.	affirmed
Cramp & Sons v. International C.M.T. Co.	645 (1913)	White	none	none	3d Cir.	reversed
Ex parte Spencer	652 (1913)	McKenna	none	none	Pa.	habeas corpus denied
Susquehanna C. Co. v. City of South Amboy	665 (1913)	McKenna	none	none	C.C.D.N.J.	affirmed
Wood v. Chesborough	672 (1913)	McKenna	none	none	Miss.	dismissed
Chicago D. & C. Co. v. Fraley	680 (1913)	McKenna	none	none	Ill.	affirmed
Brooks v. Central S.J.	688 (1913)	Holmes	none	none	D.P.R.	affirmed
Francis v. McNeal	695 (1913)	Holmes	none	none	3d Cir.	affirmed
St. Louis et al. R.R. Co. v. Hesterly	702 (1913)	Holmes	none	none	Ariz.	affirmed
Sanford v. Ainsa	705 (1913)	Holmes	none	none	Ariz.	affirmed
Donnelly v. United States	708 (1913)	Pitney	none	none	C.C.N.D. Cal.	rehearing denied
