= M. I. Parcell =

American politician

Member of the Washington House of Representatives for the 38th district
- In office 1891–1893

Personal details
- Born: 1854 Minersville, Schuylkill County, Pennsylvania, United States
- Died: May 13, 1916 (aged 62) Port Angeles, Washington, United States
- Party: Republican
- Occupation: coal miner

Mordecai I. Parcell (1854 – May 13, 1916) was an American politician in the state of Washington. A Republican, he served in the Washington House of Representatives from 1895 to 1897.
