= The Fair v. Kohler Die & Specialty Co. =

- Supreme Court of the United States

Decided March 6, 1913
- Full case name: The Fair v. Kohler Die & Specialty Co.
- Citations: 228 U.S. 22 (more)

Holding
- Federal question jurisdiction is based on the affirmative pleadings of the plaintiff and their choices of what law to use, not on the federal defenses that the plaintiff anticipates the defendant might use or that the defendant actually uses.

Court membership
- Chief Justice Edward D. White Associate Justices Joseph McKenna · Oliver W. Holmes Jr. William R. Day · Horace H. Lurton; Charles E. Hughes · Willis Van Devanter; Joseph R. Lamar · Mahlon Pitney

Case opinion
- Majority: Holmes, joined by unanimous

The Fair v. Kohler Die & Specialty Co., 228 U.S. 22 (1913), was a United States Supreme Court case in which the court held that federal question jurisdiction is based on the affirmative pleadings of the plaintiff and their choices of what law to use, not on the federal defenses that the plaintiff anticipates the defendant might use or that the defendant actually uses.

== Background ==
The plaintiff sued the defendant for patent infringement. After being sued, the defendant appeared specially to challenge jurisdiction, but they did so with a factual defense. That is, the defendant said the court could not take the case because it had no chance of succeeding on the merits. Because this was not an appropriate challenge to jurisdiction, the court sustained its jurisdiction and the case continued. However, the defendant did not file any kind of answer to the complaint other than the special appearance. The court therefore entered a default judgment in the plaintiff's favor. The defendant appealed the finding of jurisdiction.

== Opinion of the court ==
The Supreme Court issued an opinion on March 6, 1913.

== Later developments ==
The case has been noted for its connection to the legal principle that "the plaintiff is the master of his case." In his opinion, Justice Holmes said "the party who brings a suit is master to decide what law he will rely upon". This principle is encapsulated in the well-pleaded complaint rule.
