= Tuscumbia Railway =

American railway

- Approximate route of the Tuscumbia Railway. Courtesy: OpenHistoricalMap

Overview
- Headquarters: Tuscumbia, Alabama
- Locale: North Alabama
- Dates of operation: 1830–1832

The Tuscumbia Railway was chartered on January 16, 1830, and a 2.1 mile railroad was built from downtown Tuscumbia, Alabama, to the docks on the Tennessee River, west of Sheffield. This was the first railroad chartered or constructed west of the Appalachian Mountains. The purpose of this railroad was to allow transport of cotton bales to a new wharf on the Tennessee River.

With the success of this small railroad, a new railroad was built from Tuscumbia to Decatur via Courtland. Before the impounding of Wilson Lake, the Tennessee River had a stretch of shallow rapids between these points known as the Muscle Shoals, which made river transport impossible. This railroad was designed to bypass that obstacle. Thus, the line was extended, and the Tuscumbia, Courtland and Decatur Railroad came into being two years later.

== See also ==
- Oldest railroads in North America
