= Tuscumbia, Courtland and Decatur Railroad =

- System map, courtesy OpenHistoricalMap

Overview
- Locale: North Alabama
- Dates of operation: 1832–1850
- Predecessor: Tuscumbia Railway
- Successor: Memphis and Charleston Railroad

Technical
- Track gauge: 5 ft (1,524 mm)

The Tuscumbia, Courtland and Decatur Railroad was a railroad in Alabama, the United States.

The railroad was chartered on January 13, 1832 by David Hubbard, the founder of the Tuscumbia Railway in partnership with Benjamin Sherrod, a wealthy planter from Courtland. Sherrod became president, and Hubbard served as secretary.

The railway was planned to continue the Tuscumbia Railway, which had been built 2 years earlier to give Tuscumbia, Alabama access to the Tennessee River. The vision was a railroad that ran from Decatur to Tuscumbia, providing a new route around the Muscle Shoals enabling goods to be transported further up the Tennessee River.

Construction began in mid-1832, the first segment between Tuscumbia and Leighton was completed August 20, 1833. Traffic between those two cities began at the day of completion. The second segment between Leighton and Courtland was completed in July of 1834. The final segment to Decatur was completed December 15, 1834.

Construction was speedy because of the large cotton industry in North Alabama. Barges could not pass through the rapids caused by the Shoals along the Tennessee River between Florence and Decatur. The Shoals Canal was congested and the state pursued funding for a railroad between The Shoals and the calmer waters in Decatur.

Following the Panic of 1837, the railroad faced immense financial difficulty. Hubbard and Sherrod struggled to keep the line open, and eventually had to pay back a bond issued by the state totaling $300,000 USD, which Sherrod paid out of his own money.

In 1850 it was incorporated into the Memphis and Charleston Railroad which eventually merged into the Southern Railway, a predecessor of Norfolk Southern. The line is still operated by Norfolk Southern Railway and serves as a vital railroad link between The Shoals, and the city of Decatur.

== See also ==
- Oldest railroads in North America
- Benjamin Sherrod, president
