= Mill Creek and Mine Hill Navigation and Railroad Company =

Map

The Mill Creek & Mine Hill Navigation and Railroad Co. was the second railroad built in Pennsylvania and the third in the United States, beginning operations in mid–1829. It was a short four mile line (eventually with about five miles of lateral connections) extending from Port Carbon, Pennsylvania along the Mill Creek towards active anthracite coal mines. Its purpose was to transport mined coal to Port Carbon which was the terminus for the Schuylkill Canal, the conduit to markets in Philadelphia.

== History ==
A legislative act authorizing the incorporation of the Mill Creek and Mine Hill Navigation and Railroad Company was passed by the Pennsylvania legislature on February 7, 1828. This proposed horse-powered railroad was to extend from near the mouth of Mill Creek in Port Carbon, Pennsylvania to a point on the Center turnpike near the foot of Broad mountain towards St. Clair, Pennsylvania, to transport coal from mines along its route to Port Carbon where the commodity could be transferred to the Schuylkill Navigation (Canal) system and ultimately transported to Philadelphia and beyond.

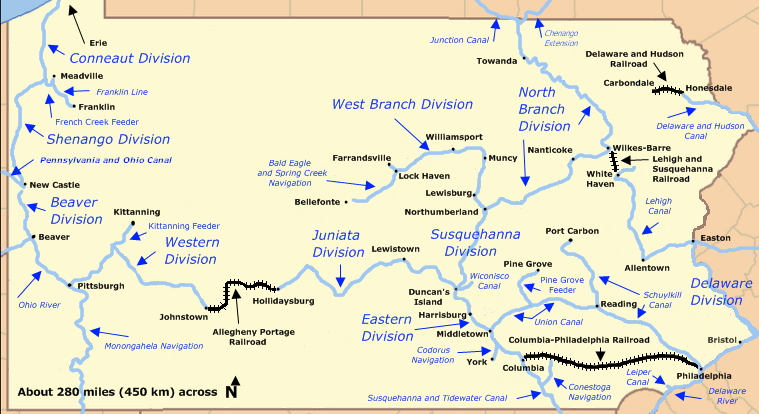
The Schuylkill Canal extended from Philadelphia to Port Carbon. The Canal above Reading was constructed primarily to transport coal and timber from the source to Philadelphia

In May, 1829, work began on the two-mile, 40-inch gauge railroad. By July 4, 1829, it was near completion and coal was being transported and passed to the canal in that same year, prior to its completion, making it the third commercial operational railroad in the United States. The railroad utilized English strap rail which enabled a single horse to easily pull six tons in six cars, and the Mill Creek R. R. was the first line in operation in the Southern Anthracite Coal Field. From its opening date, between150 to 225 tons of mined coal were carried over the line daily. The finished railroad initially had a four-mile main line and three miles of laterals.

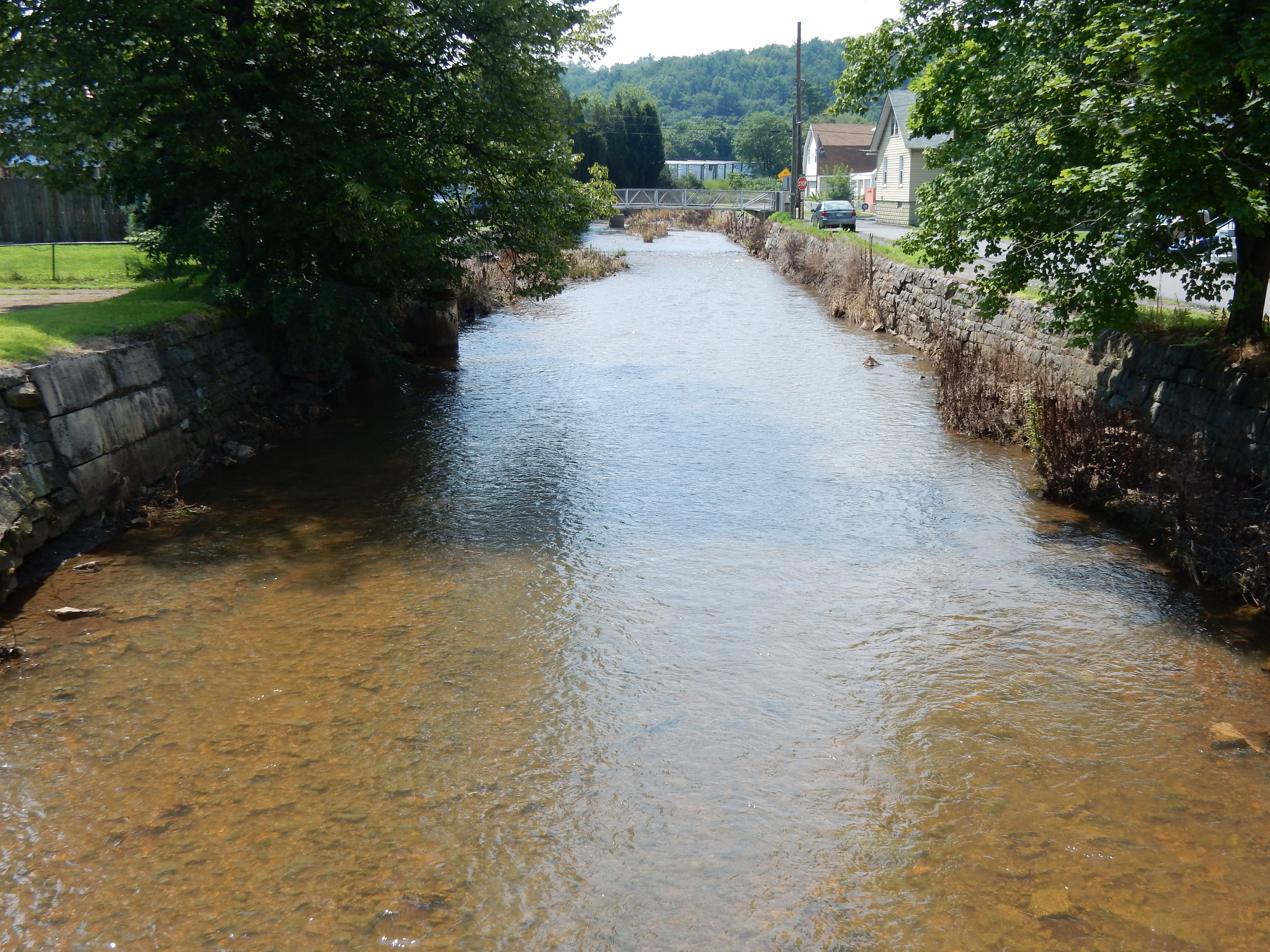
Mill Creek flowing through present day Port Carbon, PA.

Philadelphia rail advocate George W. Smith described the Mill Creek railroad in 1832, as quickly and cheaply built without direction of an engineer and in the infancy of railroads. Eventually it had nine lateral branches totaling five miles. It carried 30,300 tons of coal, in 1831, for an average haul of three miles.

Horse power and the 40-inch gauge prevailed on the Mill Creek until 1844 when a link with the Philadelphia and Reading Railroad (P&R) brought implementation of iron T-rails and standard gauge. The P&R had constructed a 2.5 mile railroad to Port Carbon to connect with its terminal at Mount Carbon, Pennsylvania and offering mine operators alternative railroad transportation for mined coal. In 1849, the Mill Creek R. R. distribution to the Schuylkill Canal and the P&R was over 100,000 tons of coal to the canal and 140,000 tons to the railroad. An 1857 charter supplement authorized the Mill Creek R. R. to build branches to the Mahanoy Valley in the Second Coal Region, but an unassociated corporation, the Mahanoy & Broad Mountain Railroad, instead built that line, which was leased and operated by the P&R. This expansion allowed coal from the Mahanoy Valley collieries to be transported south through St. Clair, Pennsylvania to the markets.
