= Port Carbon, Pennsylvania =

Borough in Pennsylvania, US

- Borough
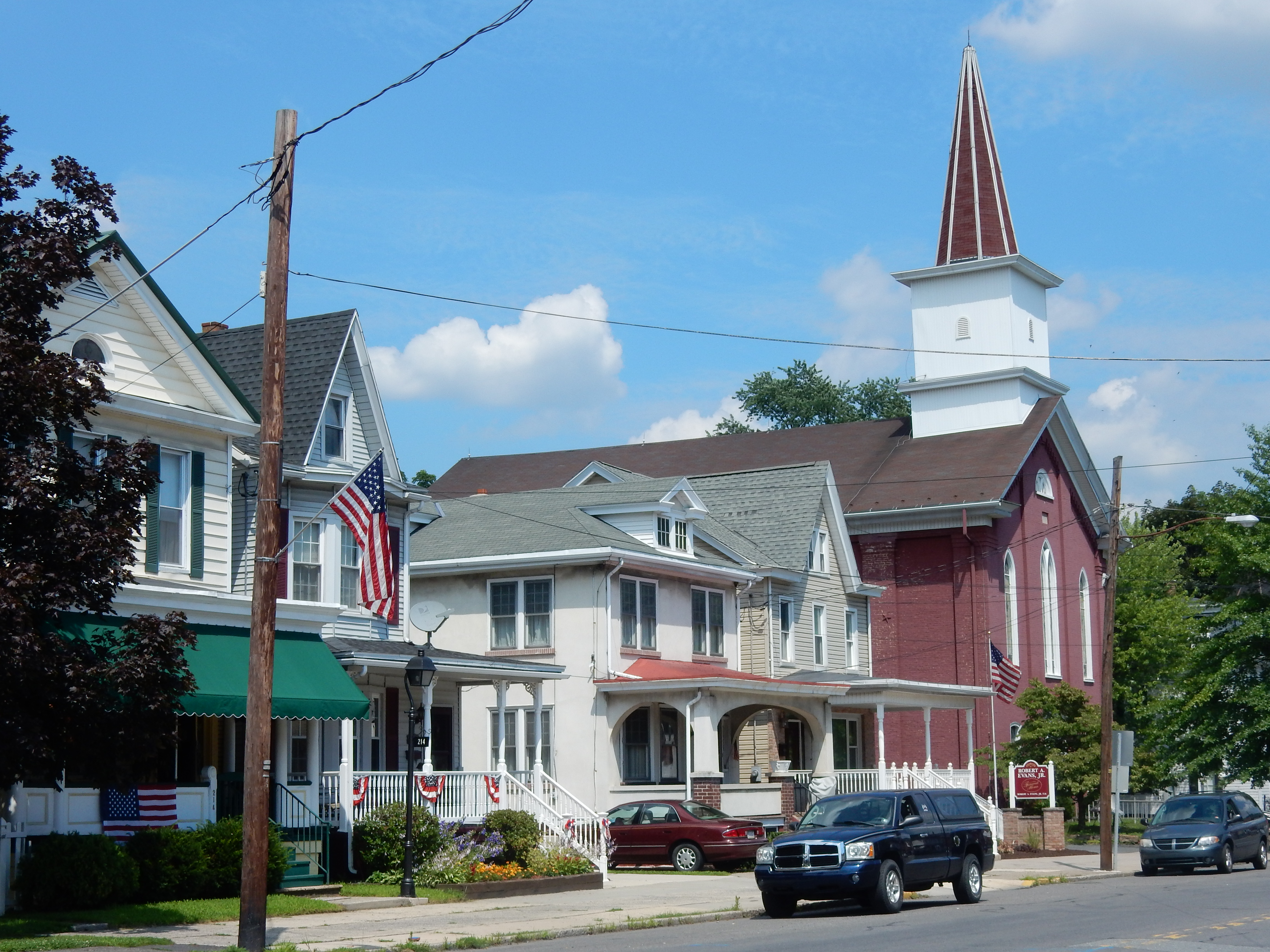
- Pike Street in Port Carbon

- Location of Port Carbon in Schuylkill County, Pennsylvania.

- Location in Pennsylvania Port Carbon (the United States)
- Coordinates: 40°41′50″N 76°10′00″W
- Country: United States
- State: Pennsylvania
- County: Schuylkill
- Settled: 1826
- Incorporated: 1852

Government
  - Type: Borough Council
  - Mayor: chase Snyder

Area
  - Total: 0.75 sq mi (1.95 km^{2})
  - Land: 0.75 sq mi (1.95 km^{2})
  - Water: 0 sq mi (0.00 km^{2})

Population (2020)
  - Total: 1,806
  - Density: 2,395/sq mi (924.6/km^{2})
- Time zone: UTC-5 (Eastern (EST))
  - Summer (DST): UTC-4 (EDT)
- Zip code: 17965
- Area code: 570
- FIPS code: 42-62128
- Website: https://portcarbonborough.org/

Port Carbon is a borough of Schuylkill County, Pennsylvania, United States, located two miles (3 km) northeast of Pottsville. It is in a coal-mining area. In the past, ironworks had been a feature of the borough. In 1900, 2,168 people lived here and, in 1910, 2,678. The population was 1,815 at the 2020 census.

== Geography ==
Port Carbon is located at 40°41′50″N 76°10′0″W (40.697210, -76.166734).

According to the United States Census Bureau, the borough has a total area of 0.8 square miles (2.1 km^{2}), all land.

== Demographics ==
Historical population
Census	Pop.	Note	%±
1830	900		—
1840	912		1.3%
1850	2,142		134.9%
1860	1,904		−11.1%
1870	2,251		18.2%
1880	2,346		4.2%
1890	1,976		−15.8%
1900	2,168		9.7%
1910	2,678		23.5%
1920	2,882		7.6%
1930	3,225		11.9%
1940	3,279		1.7%
1950	3,024		−7.8%
1960	2,775		−8.2%
1970	2,717		−2.1%
1980	2,576		−5.2%
1990	2,134		−17.2%
2000	2,019		−5.4%
2010	1,889		−6.4%
2020	1,806		−4.4%
2021 (est.)	1,815	▲	0.5%

As of the 2022 American Community Survey estimates, there were 1,748 people and 798 households. The population density was 2,318.3 inhabitants per square mile (895.1/km^{2}). There were 877 housing units at an average density of 1,163.1 per square mile (449.1/km^{2}). The racial makeup of the city was 92.7% White, 2.7% Black or African American, 2.2% some other race, and 0.5% Asian, with 1.9% from two or more races. Hispanics or Latinos of any race were 2.3% of the population.

Of the 798 households, 21.9% had children under the age of 18 living with them, 42.0% had seniors 65 years or older living with them, 48.9% were married couples living together, 8.6% were couples cohabitating, 21.4% had a male householder with no partner present, and 21.1% had a female householder with no partner present. The median household size was 2.19 and the median family size was 2.89.

The age distribution was 18.3% under 18, 4.6% from 18 to 24, 23.3% from 25 to 44, 29.9% from 45 to 64, and 23.8% who were 65 or older. The median age was 48.4 years. For every 100 females, there were 93.4 males.

The median income for a household was $54,706, with family households having a median income of $68,839 and non-family households $34,805. The per capita income was $28,989. Out of the 1,748 people with a determined poverty status, 7.6% were below the poverty line. Further, 0.9% of minors and 8.7% of seniors were below the poverty line.

In the survey, residents self-identified with various ethnic ancestries. People of German descent made up 19.6% of the population of the town, followed by Irish at 18.4%, Polish at 11.6%, Italian at 9.6%, Lithuanian at 5.4%, Slovak at 4.9%, Ukrainian at 3.4%, American at 3.3%, Welsh at 2.9%, Dutch at 1.9%, English at 1.7%, Arab at 1.1%, Scottish at 0.9%, Sub-Saharan African at 0.7%, and French at 0.6%.

== History ==
Port Carbon was founded by Abraham Pott, a son of John Pott who founded Pottsville in 1806.

Port Carbon was the site of the first lock on the Schuylkill Canal, on its route for transport of coal mined in the region to Philadelphia. Robert Allison, a local industrialist, purchased the first commercially manufactured automobile, a Winton.

== Notable person ==
- Peggy Maley, former actress

== Gallery ==
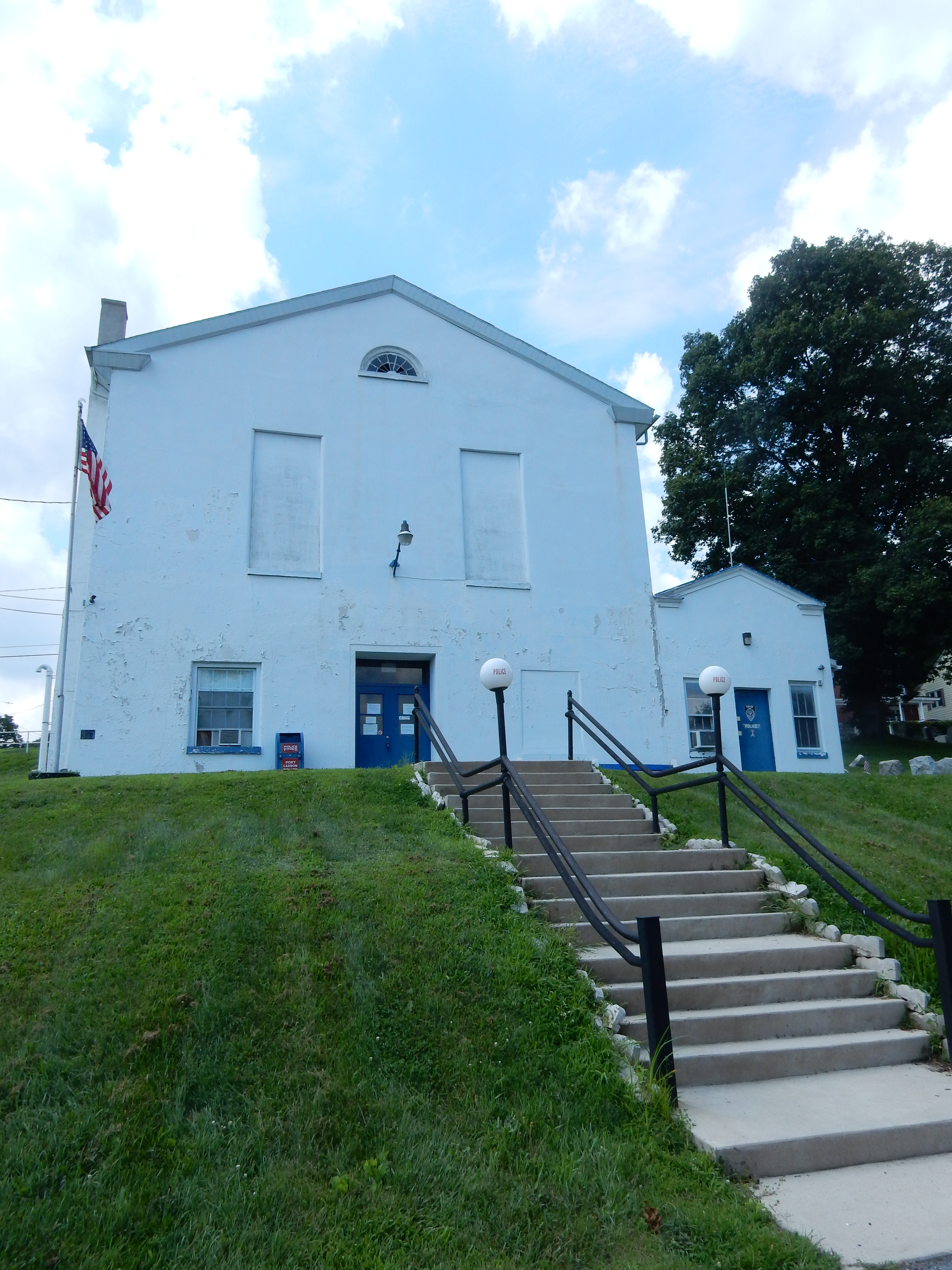
Port Carbon Borough Hall

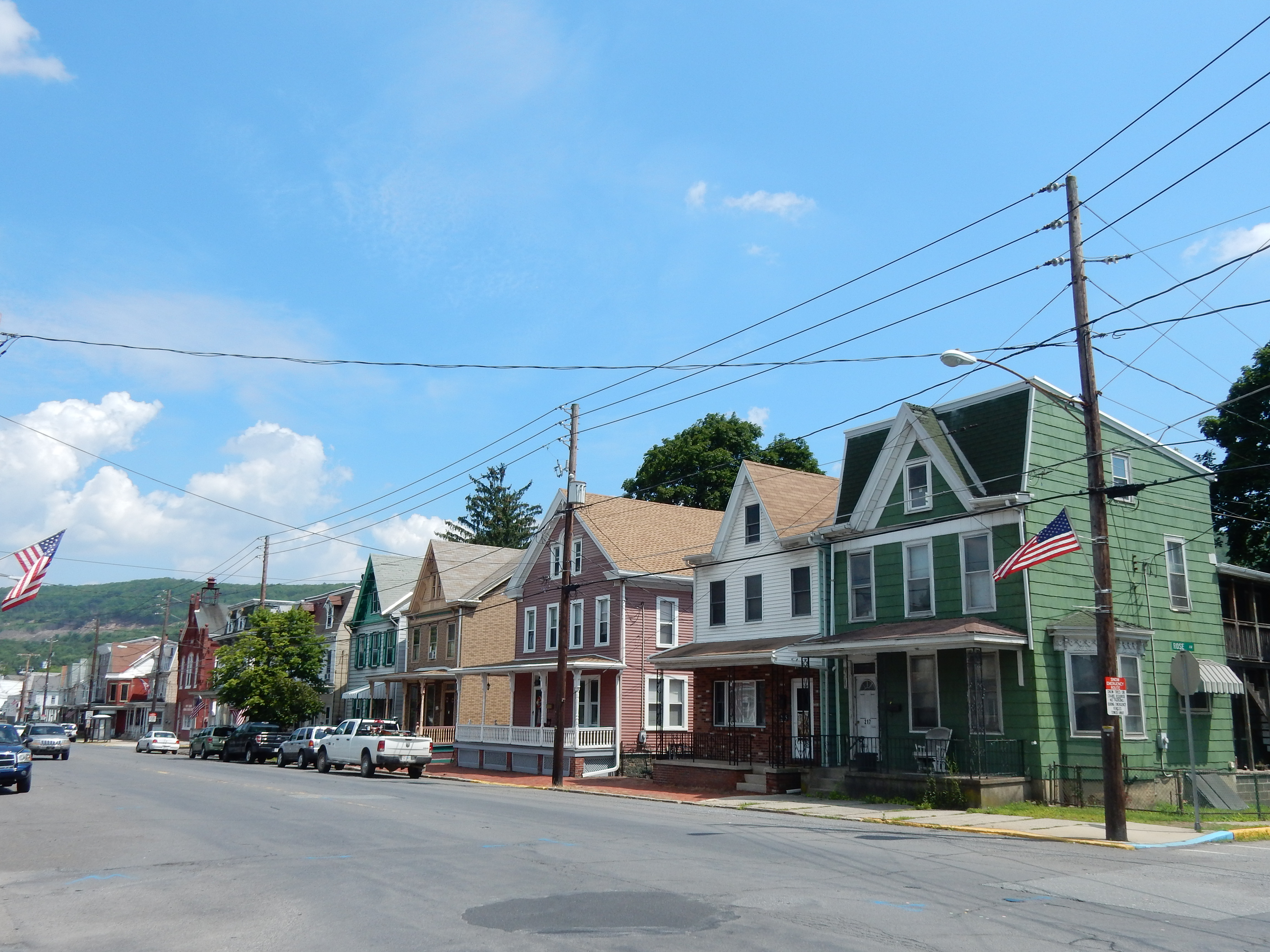
Pike Street

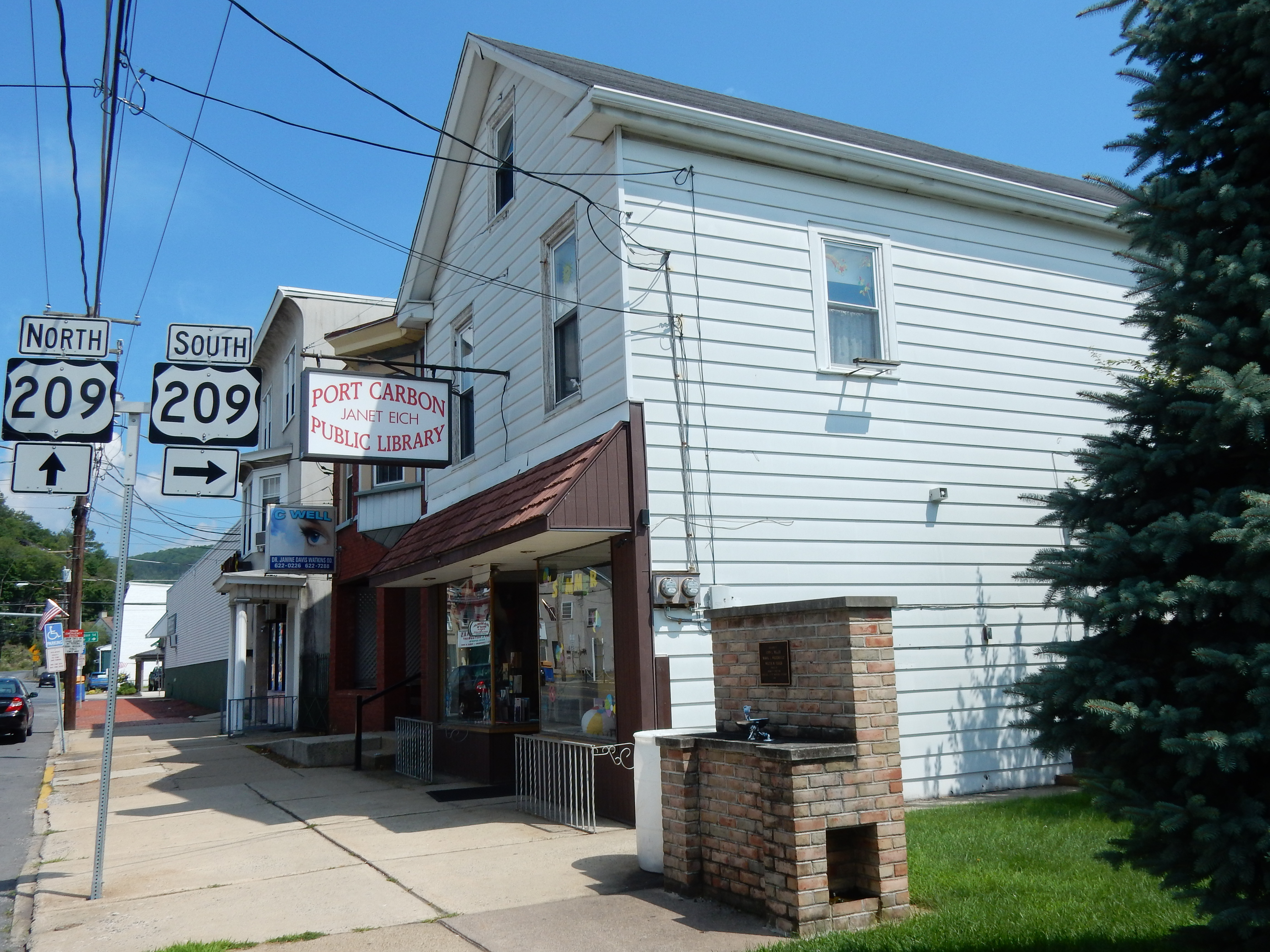
Public library

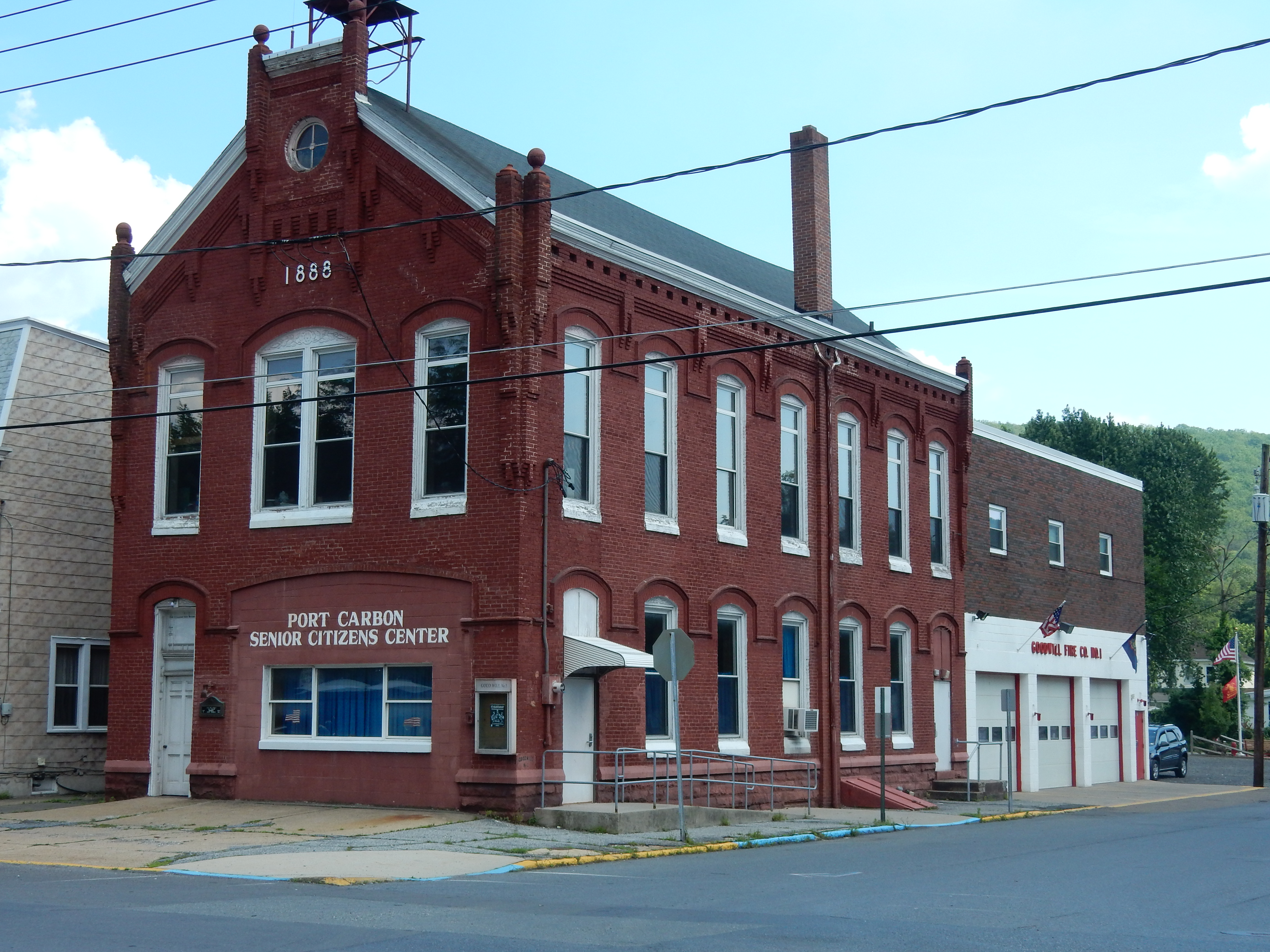
Port Carbon Senior Citizens Center

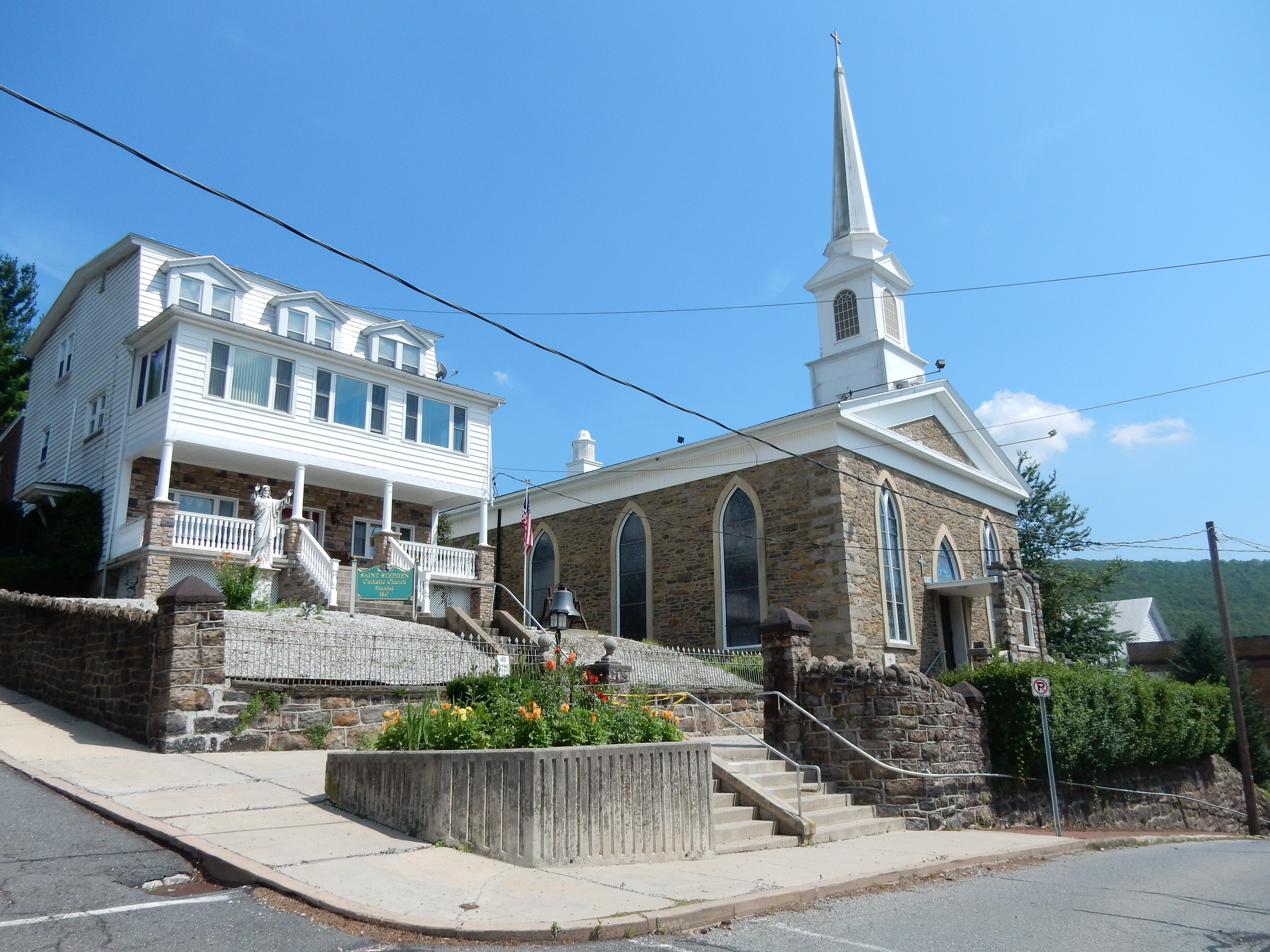
St. Stephen's Catholic Church
