= Mine Hill and Schuylkill Haven Railroad =

Map

The Mine Hill & Schuylkill Haven Railroad (MH&SH) was operating by April 1831 in Schuylkill County, Pennsylvania, from above Mine Hill Gap (north of Minersville) to Schuylkill Haven on the Schuylkill Canal. This railroad was developed by the New York and Schuylkill Coal Co., and was one of the important early "lateral" railroads of Schuylkill County which were constructed to accommodate the Schuylkill canal (in this case located at Schuylkill Haven) with coal tonnage from the more remote areas where mines were operating. In 1862 the MH&SH was leased by the Philadelphia and Reading Railroad Company (P&RR) and became part of its operation system.

== Development of the railroad ==
The MH&SH was incorporated by the Pennsylvania legislature on March 24, 1828. The New York and Schuylkill Coal Co., with extensive land holdings on the West Branch Schuylkill River, began to plan for its construction prior to legislative approval - running surveys for the railroad along the West Branch and, on November 3, 1827, announcing plans to award contracts for railroad construction within six to eight weeks. The railroad ultimately organized on May 21, 1828, with Burd Patterson and Samuel H. Kneass, who visited England with Strickland, the engineer, among its managers. The trip to England was to obtain first-hand knowledge of the latest railroad technology.

By April 1831, the heavy downstream track carried coal about 10 miles (16 km), from above Mine Hill Gap to Schuylkill Haven. A light return track was built. In 1831, the line carried 17,559 tons of anthracite to the canal. The railroad carried over 1,500,000 tons in 1859. The line followed the valley of the West Branch, as near grade as possible. Thus the route was a succession of curves with frequent small bridges. The rails were strap iron, although a pear-shaped rail, similar to that used on the Philadelphia and Columbia Railroad, was eventually utilized.

== Ashland Extension ==
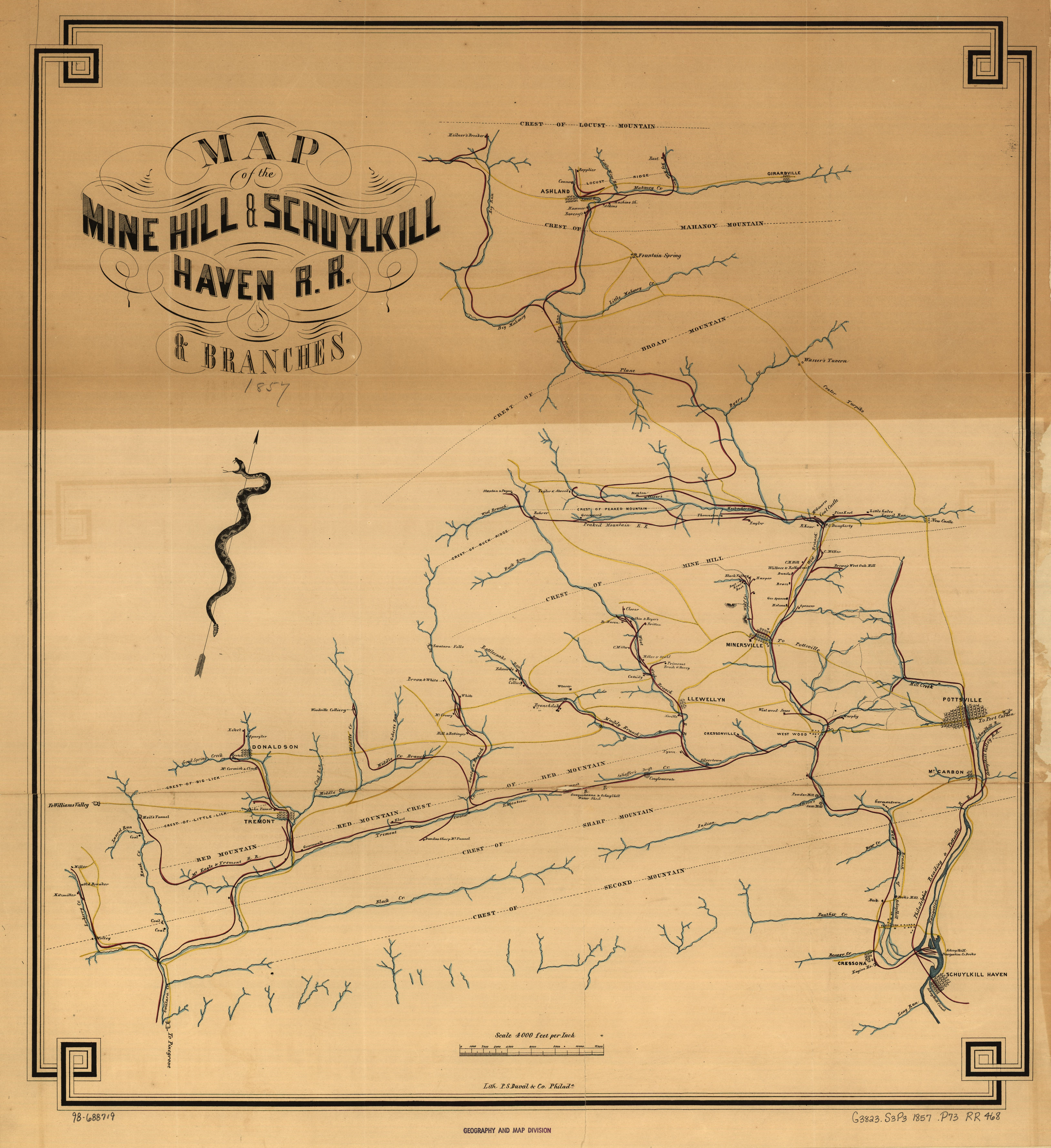
1857 Map of the Routes of the MH&SH RR including the Ashland Extension

Although the New York and Schuylkill Coal Co. was legislated out of existence in 1832 and its land holding sold, the MH&SH expanded. Lateral construction to Deep Run and Mine Hill soon covered 60 to 70 square miles (160 to 180 km^{2}) of productive coal lands. The company developed the 22-mile (35 km) Muddy Run Branch in 1836, and purchased the Wolf Creek branch from mine owners in 1838. In 1836, the Legislature authorized new capitalization and the use of locomotives. Despite this, animal power was used until 1847. Use of locomotives decreased the number of trainsets, and the town of Cressona was laid out with engine houses, shops, and stores for railroad material to accommodate the change.

Passenger traffic was begun in 1848, with two trains running each way between Schuylkill Haven and Minersville, and one train to and from Tremont.

After constructing these branches to most of the available points south of Broad Mountain and west of Pottsville, the MH&SH was asked in 1848 to extend their main line across Broad Mountain into the Middle (or Second) coal field (to be known as the "Ashland Extension"). The effort to do this had once before been made in the partial construction of the Danville and Pottsville Railroad (1826). This prior effort had proved a failure and was abandoned altogether in the 1830s.

An extension survey began in 1848. The MH&SH extension was to connect with the Philadelphia & Sunbury Railroad (formerly the Danville and Pottsville). The extension was to include two inclined planes (Gordon Planes) on the north of the mountain to hoist the loaded cars with stationary machines. However, design problems (and cost estimate overruns) led to delays. The 1852 P&RR Annual Report noted that two lateral railroads would tap the Second Coal Region during 1853 (neither of which proved accurate). The MH&SH would join with the Philadelphia & Sunbury, the old Danville and Pottsville, to carry the Danville iron trade. The second line was to have been the 1853-chartered East Mahanoy Tunnel line of the Little Schuylkill Railroad, which was not opened until a decade later.

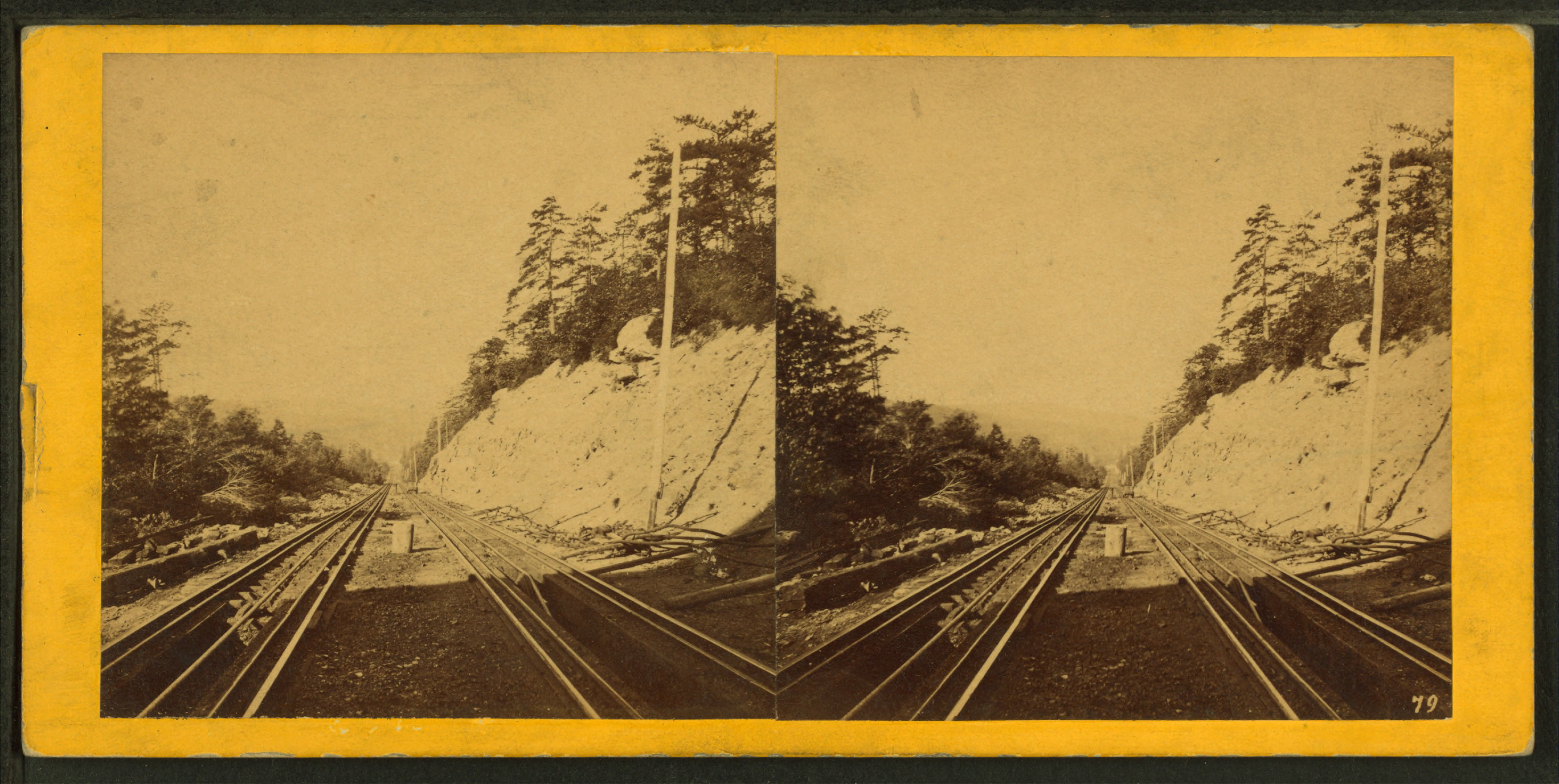
Upper Gordon Plane, Ashland Extension of the MH&SH Railroad

The extension was not competed until September 16, 1864. An engine and trainset of coal cars, with a small passenger car, travelled from Cressona to the terminus at Big Mine Run. The machines for hoisting and lowering cars at the inclined planes were not ready, and the descent was made by the use of brakes on the cars.

The MH&SH also expanded service from these new tracks during construction. The Big Run Branch was extended northwestward from Gordon to Locustdale, west of Ashland, in 1856. Four years later the Locust Mountain Coal Company requested that the Big Run Branch be extended to their coal basin north of Locust Mountain, a rise of 300 feet (91 m) in less than a mile. Rather than build a switchback, the MH&SH erected a self-acting plane, which eventually opened the Centralia area and was in service after 1883. Also, in 1860, the MH&SH completed a connection to Sunbury, by extending the Big Run Branch from Locustdale to the Shamokin Valley & Pottsville Road.

Passenger service was also available over the Gordon Planes, which continued until 1865, when the Reading inaugurated service from Ashland over the Mahanoy & Broad Mountain, the East Mahanoy, the Little Schuylkill and the P&RR Railroads to Philadelphia. During 1862, the company extended also westward from Tremont via a merger.

== Mahanoy & Broad Mountain Railroad ==
While the MH&SH was expanding into the Mahanoy Valley between 1848 and 1864, the Mahanoy & Broad Mountain Railroad (M&BM) was chartered on March 29, 1859, to build from the Mt. Carbon & Mine Hill Railroad (a P&RR backed enterprise) into the Mine Run, Shenandoah, Mahanoy, and New Boston coal basins to essentially compete with the MH&SH. The new railroad was intended to be a rival of the MH&SH in that region, and the transportation charges were reduced below those of the latter company, to adversely affect its revenues. A conflict began between the rival interests, and litigation ensued, resulting in a confirmation of what had been suspected, that the P&RR had been behind the scenes to ultimately gain control of the MH&SH, and cripple the canal as a coal-carrying rival.

MH&SH decided to oppose the P&RR by sending its coal to New York by a direct connection via Lizard Creek to the Lehigh Valley. Alexander W. Rae had surveyed the route of the Schuylkill Haven & Lehigh Railroad in 1856. By December 16, 1862, the MH&SH had completed the new outlet's location and had awarded building contracts. The alarmed Canal Company, almost entirely dependent on the MH&SH for its coal tonnage but unable to finance a long-term lease, used its influence with the MH&SH — there were interlocking corporate boards — to arrange a lease with the P&RR, insuring the Canal of its share of traffic.

After this agreement, work on the Lehigh extension ended in May 1864. On the very same day, the P&RR leased the MH&SH and thereby gained control of the company.
