= Minersville, Pennsylvania =

Borough in Pennsylvania, US

- Borough
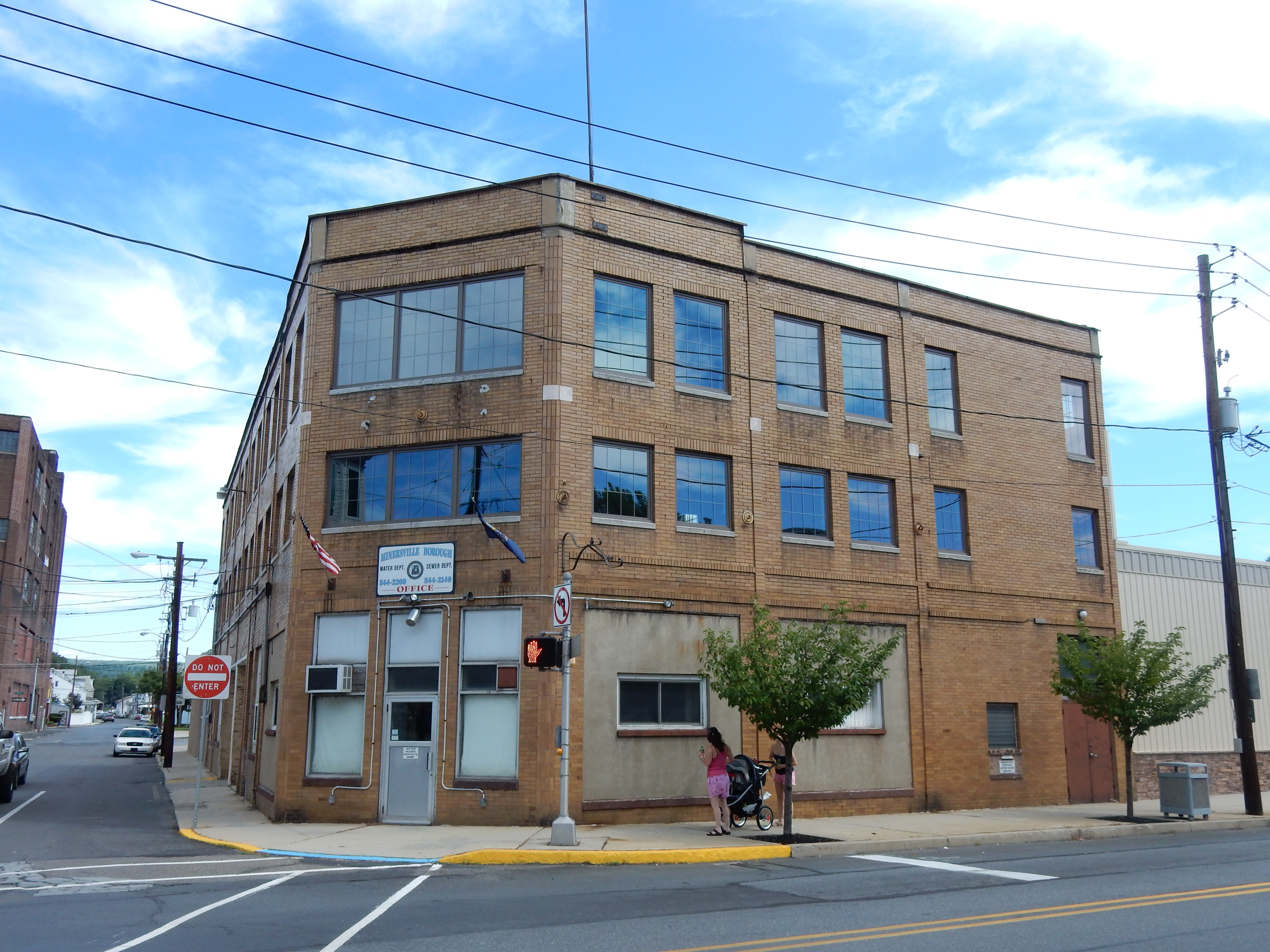
- Minersville Borough Office on Sunbury Street

- Location of Minersville in Schuylkill County, Pennsylvania.

- Location in Pennsylvania Minersville (the United States)
- Coordinates: 40°41′26″N 76°15′37″W
- Country: United States
- State: Pennsylvania
- County: Schuylkill
- Settled: 1783
- Incorporated: 1831

Government
  - Type: Borough Council
  - Mayor: Sean Palmer

Area
  - Total: 0.66 sq mi (1.70 km^{2})
  - Land: 0.66 sq mi (1.70 km^{2})
  - Water: 0 sq mi (0.00 km^{2})

Population (2020)
  - Total: 4,370
  - Density: 6,653.6/sq mi (2,568.97/km^{2})
- 420
- Time zone: UTC-5 (Eastern (EST))
  - Summer (DST): UTC-4 (EDT)
- Zip code: 17954
- Area code: 570
- FIPS code: 42-50088
- Website: https://minersvillepa.gov/

Minersville is a borough in Schuylkill County, Pennsylvania, United States. Anthracite coal deposits are plentiful in the region. The population was 4,388 at the 2020 census.

Minersville is located 50.8 miles (81.8 km) west of Allentown, 100 miles (160 km) northwest of Philadelphia, and 138.4 miles (222.7 km) west of New York City.

== History ==
In the year 1783, a settler by the name of Adolph Oliver Busch traveled through the valley between the Thomaston Mountains and the Gap Rocks. At this junction, several mountain streams converged where this settler built a log cabin and a sawmill on the west Branch of the Schuylkill River, just below the mouth of Wolf Creek. Shortly thereafter, he built a tavern on the South Side of the Sunbury Trail on the present site of the Saint Michael the Archangel Church.

This tavern was referred to as the "Half Way House", because it was half-way between Reading and Sunbury. The Sunbury Trail was the first road through Schuylkill County and was known as the Kings Highway which was authorized by the Crown of England, King George III in 1770. The early settlers engaged in timbering as their first livelihood, but experienced difficulty in transporting the heavy logs out of the valley. The rough timber was floated by raft to Schuylkill Haven to the Schuylkill Canal and on to Reading where it was sold or traded for other products. By local tradition the hunter Necho Allen discovered coal in the area, but it was not until about 1814 that any actual mining took place. Dr. McFarland, a scientist, opened a vein at York Farm near Pottsville. Later, in 1818, Jacob Reed, son of the original founder, opened another vein in the Minersville Area.

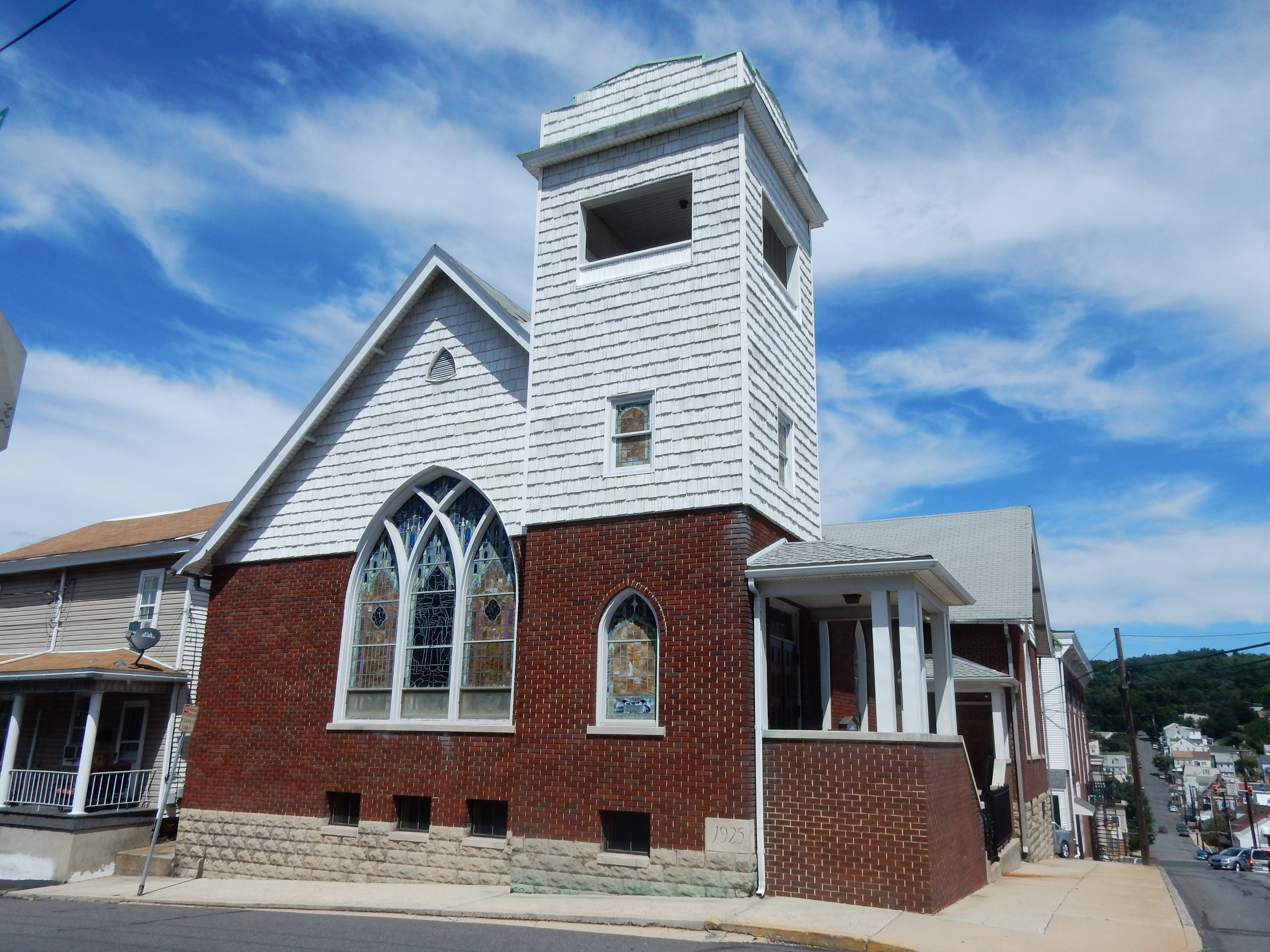
English Baptist Church.

The completion of the Schuylkill Haven and Mine Hill Railroad provided the means to transport the coal produced in the region. The development of the coal industry grew rapidly and attracted many immigrants. Experienced English and Welsh miners arrived first from their respective countries. The next arrivals were Germans and Irish immigrants, soon to be followed by many other ethnic groups that make up the community.

The influx of inhabitants to the community promoted the need to begin municipal planning. Titus Bennett laid out the town in 1830 on parts of two tracts of land patented to Lawrence Lewis and Robert M. Lewis on July 20, 1829, at that time part of Branch Township. On May 2, 1830, Minersville citizens held an election at the home of David Buckwater for the purpose of electing a Burgess. Samuel Richert was elected to this position, as well as the following men who served on the first Council: John Provst, John Patrick, Dr. Anthony Steinberger, John L. Swaine, John B. Hahn, David Buckwater and Daniel R. Bennet. The first president of the town council was Daniel R. Bennet; first treasurer, Thomas J. Harman, Clerk, and Milligan G. Gable, High Constable. Minersville was incorporated as a borough on April 1, 1831 by Act of the legislature approved by Governor George Wolf. Minersville School District was involved in a national court case gaining much attention; Minersville School District v. Gobitis, 1940. This case dealt with a family whose children would not salute the flag or recite the Pledge of Allegiance because of their religious beliefs (they were Jehovah's Witnesses). This case would put Minersville "on the map," as it reached all the way to the Supreme Court. The final verdict was that the school district could, in fact, make students stand, salute, and recite the Pledge of Allegiance. This decision came under much scrutiny and would not stay long, as it would be overturned shortly thereafter by West Virginia State Board of Education v. Barnette.

== Geography ==
Minersville is located at 40°41′26″N 76°15′37″W (40.690455, -76.260242).

According to the United States Census Bureau, the borough has a total area of 0.7 square miles (1.8 km^{2}), all land.

== Demographics ==
Historical population
Census	Pop.	Note	%±
1840	1,265		—
1850	2,951		133.3%
1860	4,024		36.4%
1870	3,699		−8.1%
1880	3,249		−12.2%
1890	3,504		7.8%
1900	4,815		37.4%
1910	7,240		50.4%
1920	7,845		8.4%
1930	9,392		19.7%
1940	8,686		−7.5%
1950	7,783		−10.4%
1960	6,606		−15.1%
1970	6,012		−9.0%
1980	5,635		−6.3%
1990	4,877		−13.5%
2000	4,552		−6.7%
2010	4,397		−3.4%
2020	4,370		−0.6%
2021 (est.)	4,393	▲	0.5%

The borough was founded in 1831.

=== 2020 census ===
As of the 2020 census, Minersville had a population of 4,370. The median age was 40.3 years. 22.7% of residents were under the age of 18 and 17.3% of residents were 65 years of age or older. For every 100 females there were 93.7 males, and for every 100 females age 18 and over there were 91.5 males age 18 and over.

100.0% of residents lived in urban areas, while 0.0% lived in rural areas.

There were 1,941 households in Minersville, of which 26.2% had children under the age of 18 living in them. Of all households, 28.9% were married-couple households, 26.0% were households with a male householder and no spouse or partner present, and 34.4% were households with a female householder and no spouse or partner present. About 39.0% of all households were made up of individuals and 16.9% had someone living alone who was 65 years of age or older.

There were 2,269 housing units, of which 14.5% were vacant. The homeowner vacancy rate was 2.8% and the rental vacancy rate was 7.7%.

Racial composition as of the 2020 census
Race	Number	Percent
White	3,894	89.1%
Black or African American	106	2.4%
American Indian and Alaska Native	7	0.2%
Asian	34	0.8%
Native Hawaiian and Other Pacific Islander	1	0.0%
Some other race	106	2.4%
Two or more races	222	5.1%
Hispanic or Latino (of any race)	276	6.3%

=== 2000 census ===
As of the census of 2000, there were 4,552 people, 2,041 households, and 1,226 families residing in the borough. The population density was 6,948.9 inhabitants per square mile (2,683.0/km^{2}). There were 2,312 housing units at an average density of 3,529.4 per square mile (1,362.7/km^{2}). The racial makeup of the borough was 98.51% White, 0.44% African American, 0.07% Native American, 0.18% Asian, 0.02% Pacific Islander, 0.07% from other races, and 0.72% from two or more races. Hispanic or Latino of any race were 0.57% of the population.

There were 2,041 households, out of which 23.8% had children under the age of 18 living with them, 42.1% were married couples living together, 13.6% had a female householder with no husband present, and 39.9% were non-families. 35.5% of all households were made up of individuals, and 21.0% had someone living alone who was 65 years of age or older. The average household size was 2.22 and the average family size was 2.86.

In the borough the population was spread out, with 21.4% under the age of 18, 6.5% from 18 to 24, 27.4% from 25 to 44, 20.8% from 45 to 64, and 23.9% who were 65 years of age or older. The median age was 41 years. For every 100 females, there were 85.8 males. For every 100 females age 18 and over, there were 80.8 males.

The median income for a household in the borough was $28,373, and the median income for a family was $36,759. Males had a median income of $32,073 versus $19,898 for females. The per capita income for the borough was $15,623. About 10.8% of families and 15.0% of the population were below the poverty line, including 17.5% of those under age 18 and 19.9% of those age 65 or over.

== Government and infrastructure ==
Schuylkill Federal Correctional Institute is in the Minersville area.

== Education ==
The school district is Minersville Area School District.

== Miscellaneous ==
- Minersville celebrated its 175th anniversary in 2006. A commemoration parade was held in the borough on August 26.
- Minersville was the birthplace of pool champion Joe Balsis (1921–1995).
- American Civil War Union general Benjamin C. Christ was a native of Minersville.
- Big Diamond Raceway is located in Minersville. It is home to seasonal weekly dirt track racing.
- The Pottsville Maroons played professional football at Minersville Park during the 1920s.
- Minersville is the setting of the 2010 film Bereavement.
- Minersville is also home to Railway Restoration Project 113, caretakers of both the Minersville Railway Station and the Central Railroad of New Jersey #113 steam locomotive. The locomotive has recently been restored to operational status and occasionally powers excursions in conjunction with the Lehigh Gorge Scenic Railway (a subsidiary of the Reading, Blue Mountain & Northern Railroad).

== Notable people ==
- M. I. Parcell (1854–1916) – politician

== Gallery ==
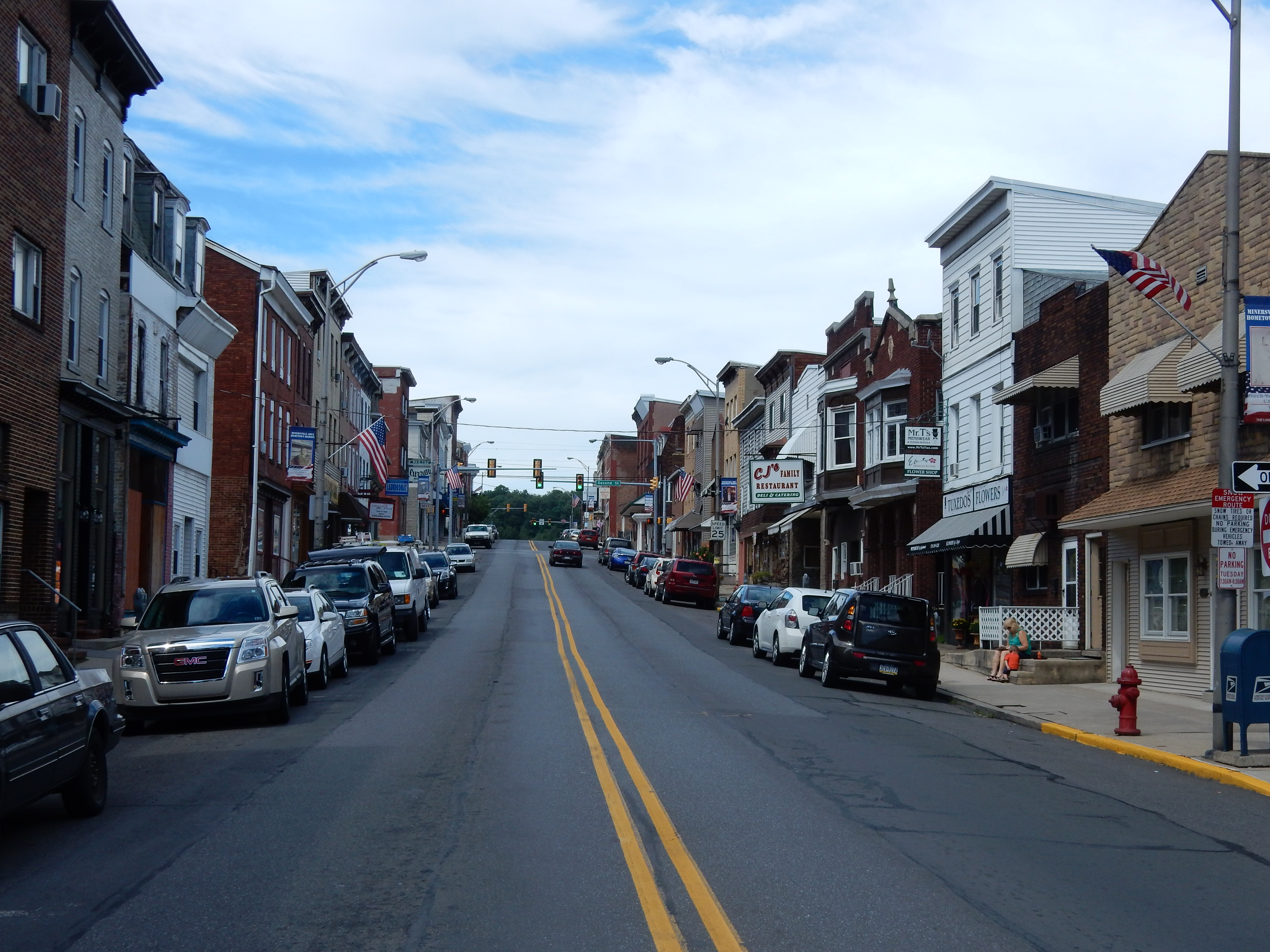
Sunbury Street (PA 901) in Minersville.

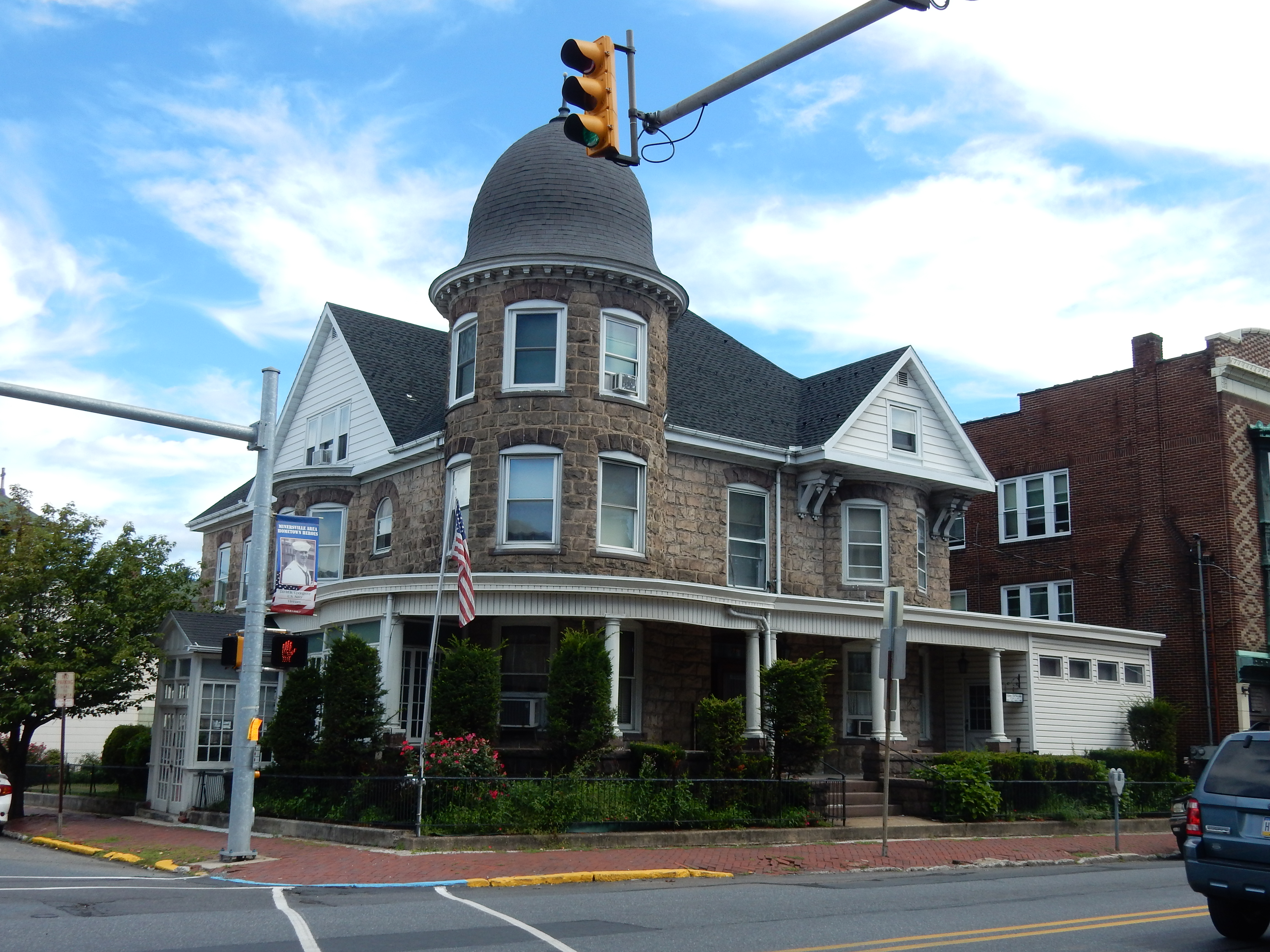
Betty and Arthur DiNicola Residence.

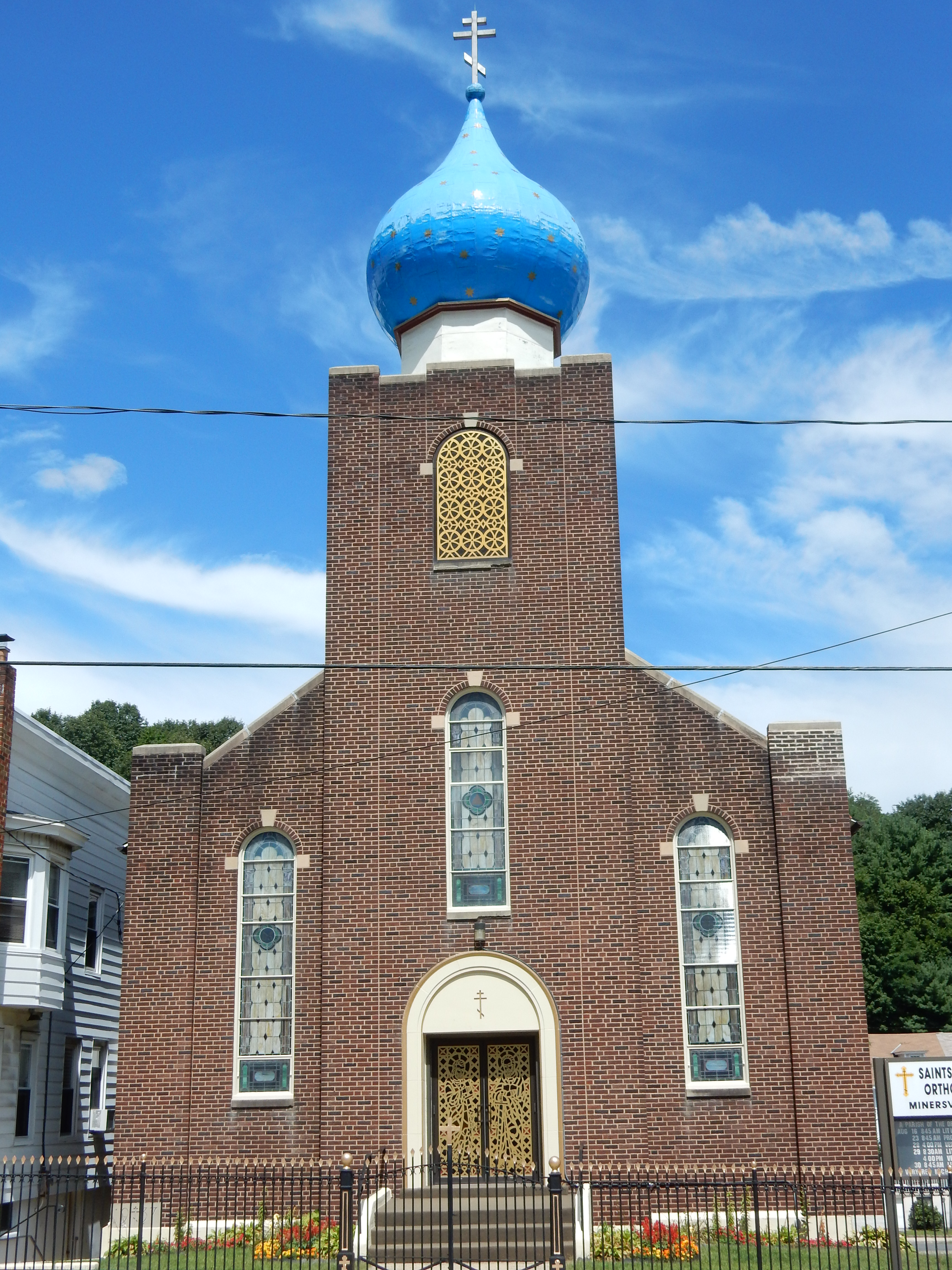
Saints Peter and Paul Orthodox Church.

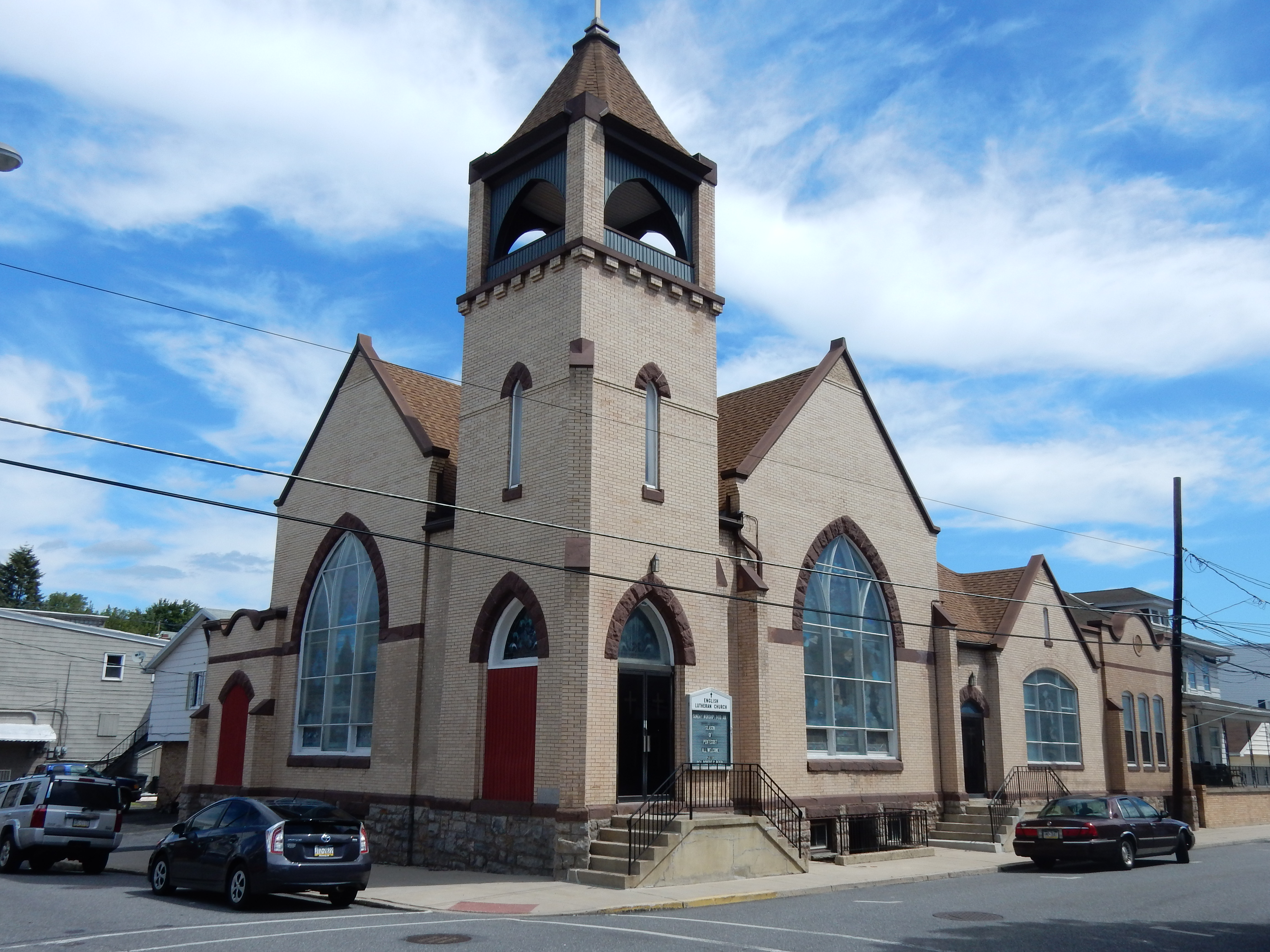
English Lutheran Church.

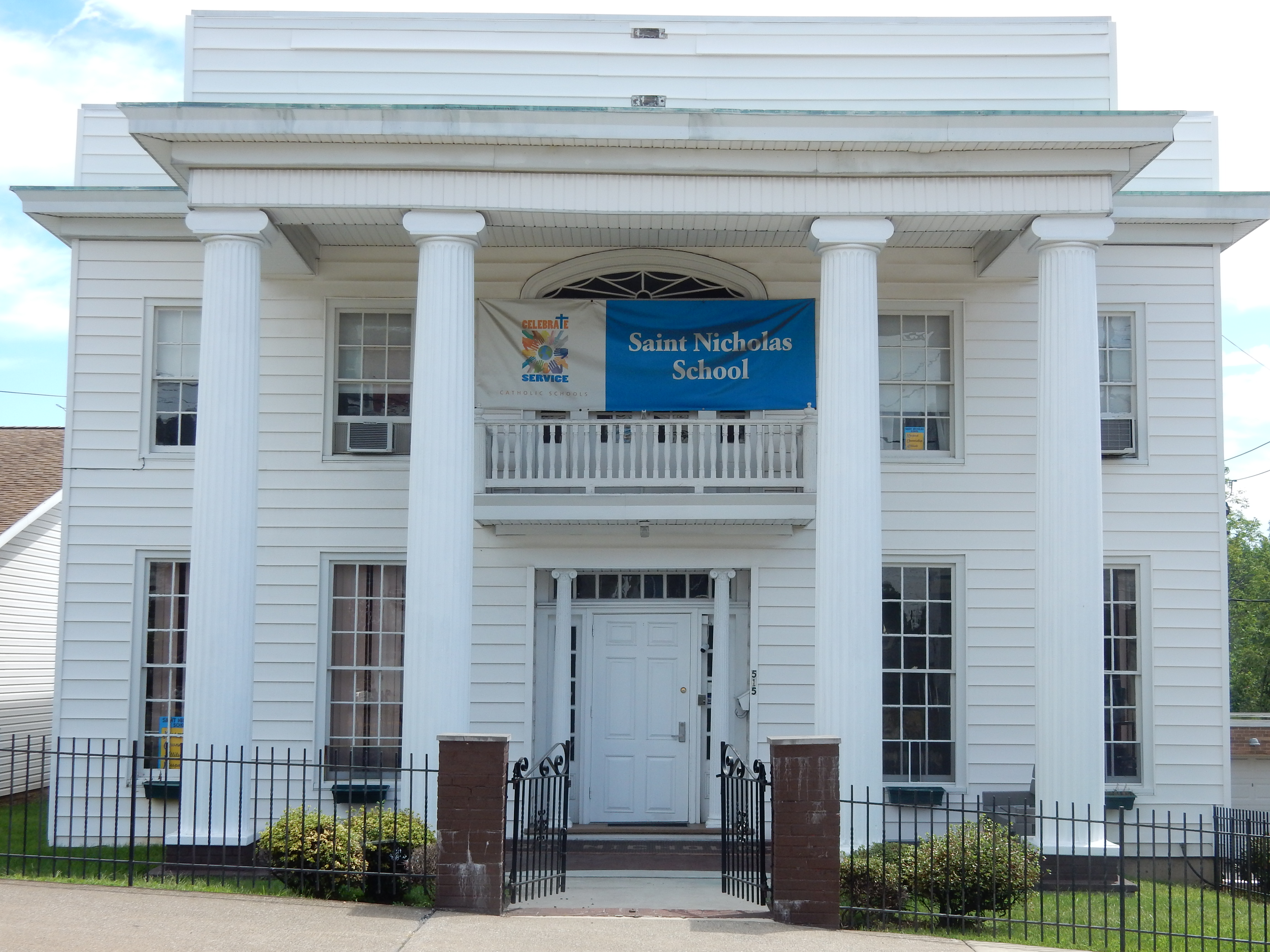
St. Nicholas School.
