= Hidalgo Early College High School =

High school in Texas, United States

Coordinates: 26.0981°N 98.2531°W

Location
- 910 East Pirate Drive; Hidalgo, (Hidalgo County), Texas 78557; United States

Information
- Type: Public high school
- Principal: Darren Earhart
- Staff: 81.11 (FTE)
- Grades: 9-12
- Enrollment: 1,074 (2023-24)
- Student to teacher ratio: 13.24
- Colors: Navy and gold
- Nickname: Pirates
- Website: Hidalgo Early College High School

Hidalgo Early College High School (HECHS), formerly Hidalgo High School, is a public high school in Hidalgo, Texas. It is the only high school in the Hidalgo Independent School District. As of 2007, the school had 810 students. The school was the recipient of a $1.2 million grant that allows students to earn high school and college credits concurrently.

It, the sole high school in the district, serves most of Hidalgo and the city of Granjeno as well as small portions of McAllen, Pharr (including sections of Las Milpas), and San Juan. It southern boundary is the Rio Grande along the U.S.-Mexico border. It serves many colonias.

== The school ==
Hidalgo High School has an enrollment of 810, and the ethnicity is 100 percent Hispanic origin. Roughly 50% of its students' parents never finished high school. Despite this, the school has a 94% graduation rate and was rated as #11 on the U.S. News & World Report's 2007 list of the best public high schools, the highest ranking of any high school in the state of Texas.

Hidalgo High School is one of four U.S. high schools that have blue artificial turf installed in lieu of the traditional green turf at their stadium.

In 2001-2002, The National Center of Education Statistics recognized Hidalgo High School as one of the top ten high school for student achievement. In 2002-2003, The Texas Business Education Coalition/Just 4 the Kids recognized Hidalgo HS as a top thirteen high school for student achievement. In 2003-2004, The College Board recognized Hidalgo HS as a top eight high school for student success in Advanced Placement and percent of students continuing post secondary education. In 2004-2005, the Texas Educational Excellence Project named Hidalgo HS as a top 25 for quality and equity in educating all students.

In 2006, Hidalgo High School was given a $1.2 million grant by the Bill and Melinda Gates Foundation to set up a partnership with the University of Texas Pan American, which would enable students to earn up to 60 college credit hours prior to graduation. The program would allow students to concurrently earn both a high school diploma and an associate degree.

== Notable people ==
=== Alumni ===
- Victoria González, professional wrestler for the WWE under the ring name Raquel Rodriguez.
- Gerardo Reyes, professional baseball player for the San Diego Padres, Los Angeles Angels, and Oakland Athletics.
