= Cristela Alonzo =

American comedian and actress (born 1979)

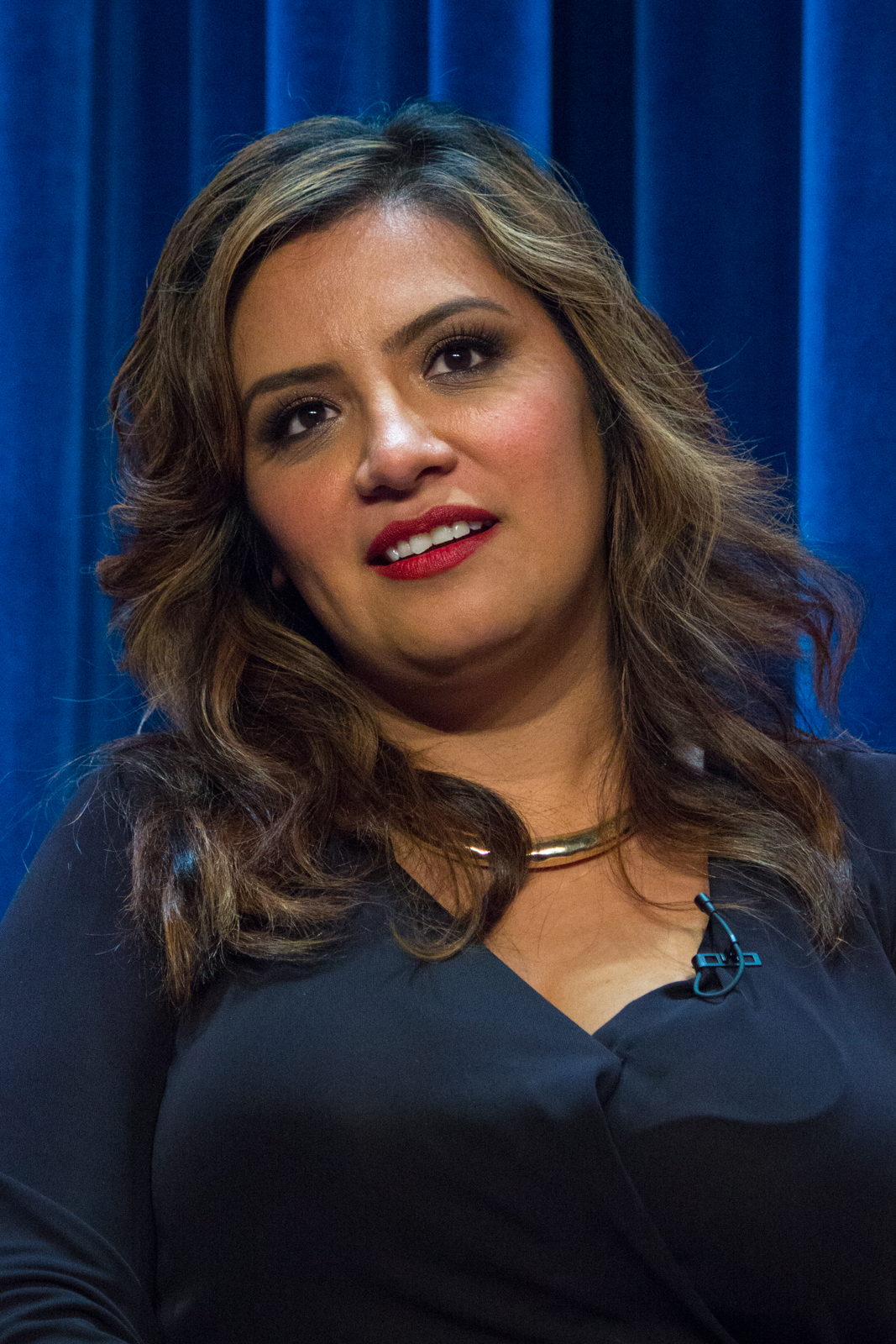
- Alonzo at the PaleyFest preview for Cristela
- Born: January 6, 1979 (age 47); Hidalgo, Texas, U.S.

Comedy career
- Years active: 1995–present
- Medium: Stand-up, television, film
- Genres: Observational comedy, blue comedy, physical comedy, surreal humor, satire
- Subjects: Latin American culture, everyday life, sex, racism, social awkwardness
- Website: cristelaalonzo.com

Cristela Alonzo (born January 6, 1979) is an American stand-up comedian, actress, writer, and producer, who created and starred in the ABC sitcom Cristela. This made Alonzo the first Mexican American woman to create, produce, write, and star in her own American primetime comedy.

== Early life ==
Cristela Alonzo was born on January 6, 1979 in Hidalgo, Texas. She was raised in San Juan, Texas, the youngest of four children of mother Natalia Gonzalez, who worked double shifts at a Mexican restaurant for about 20 years, and father Adalberto Alonzo, both of whom were from Mexico. When Alonzo's mother was pregnant with Alonzo, she left her abusive husband and raised the children alone. Alonzo has explained that she never met her father, who died in 2009.

She has three siblings, older sister Julisa Maria Alonzo and older brothers Eloy Eduardo Alonzo and Ruben G. Alonzo. Alonzo's mother came from the small village of El Zancarron in San Luis Potosi, Mexico. Throughout her childhood, on her mother's weekly day off, Alonzo spent time with her paternal grandmother in Reynosa, Mexico, just across the border.

For the first eight years of Alonzo’s life, the family squatted in an abandoned diner, and were homeless and destitute, even with her mother working double shifts as a waitress. She often went hungry, and had problems with skin pigment due to a lack of nutrition. Alonzo said her mother often used humor to offset the abject poverty. Alonzo learned English from watching TV as her family spoke only Spanish at home; her mother never learned to speak English. Television was a way for the family to stay inside, avoiding the violence from drug trafficking in their neighborhood. Alonzo would translate American shows into Spanish and act them out for her mother. Alonzo and her mother were inseparable. Alonzo and her mother shared a bed until Alonzo turned 18.

Alonzo was raised in a very strict Catholic household. Because her older sister married young, she spent much of her childhood hanging out with her older brothers and became interested in comic books, trading playing cards, a lot of Star Trek: The Next Generation, Dungeons & Dragons, and metal music. Alonzo entered and won theater competitions across South Texas while in high school. She graduated from Pharr-San Juan-Alamo High School.

At age 18, Alonzo left home to attend Webster University to study theater in St. Louis. However, Alonzo dropped out because she could no longer afford school. She went back to Dallas and moved in with her sister, where she took care of her mother who was sick and her sister's children. Alonzo's mother died in 2002.

== Career ==
In 2003, a year after her mother died, Alonzo got a job as an office manager at the Addison Improv and started doing stand-up. Alonzo said that she started doing stand-up as a way to process her grief and talk about her mom and her family. She was part of a small Dallas scene. Alonzo eventually moved to Los Angeles to become a stand-up comedian.

In 2006, Alonzo got her first break in Los Angeles when she was hired to write on the Honduran-born American comedian Carlos Mencia's Mind of Mencia, a Comedy Central show. Alonzo spent two years traveling on a bus with Mencia and five other male comics. Alonzo ended up leaving the tour.

Alonzo then spent a lot of time on the road doing college comedy shows, where she found a lot of success.

In 2010, Alonzo was a semi-finalist on the TV show Last Comic Standing, which raised her visibility and led to a May 2011 segment in the comedy showcase Legally Brown.

Alonzo did a 30-minute segment of Comedy Central's The Half Hour on June 7, 2013. She has appeared on Conan, Late Late Show with Craig Ferguson, Gabriel Iglesias Presents Stand Up Revolution, The Late Show with Stephen Colbert and Live at Gotham.

=== Cristela ===
In 2013, with TV producer Becky Clements, Alonzo created her own semi-autobiographical comedy pilot Cristela for ABC. She wrote the pilot with her writing partner, Kevin Hench. It was not greenlit as a part of the 2013–2014 television season. In an unusual move, they decided to plan to shoot a pilot presentation with the penalty money (a 30% fee they got when the network initially passed). On February 26, 2014, they shot a pilot presentation, filmed on the stage of Last Man Standing with much of that show's crew to save money; it got a strong testing response from the audience.

On May 10, 2014, ABC picked up the pilot to series for the 2014–15 television season. After an initial order of 13 episodes, nine additional episodes were ordered, bringing the total count of episodes for season 1 to 22. Cristela was a multi-camera show, shot in front of a live audience. The series concluded on May 7, 2015, and has since been cancelled.

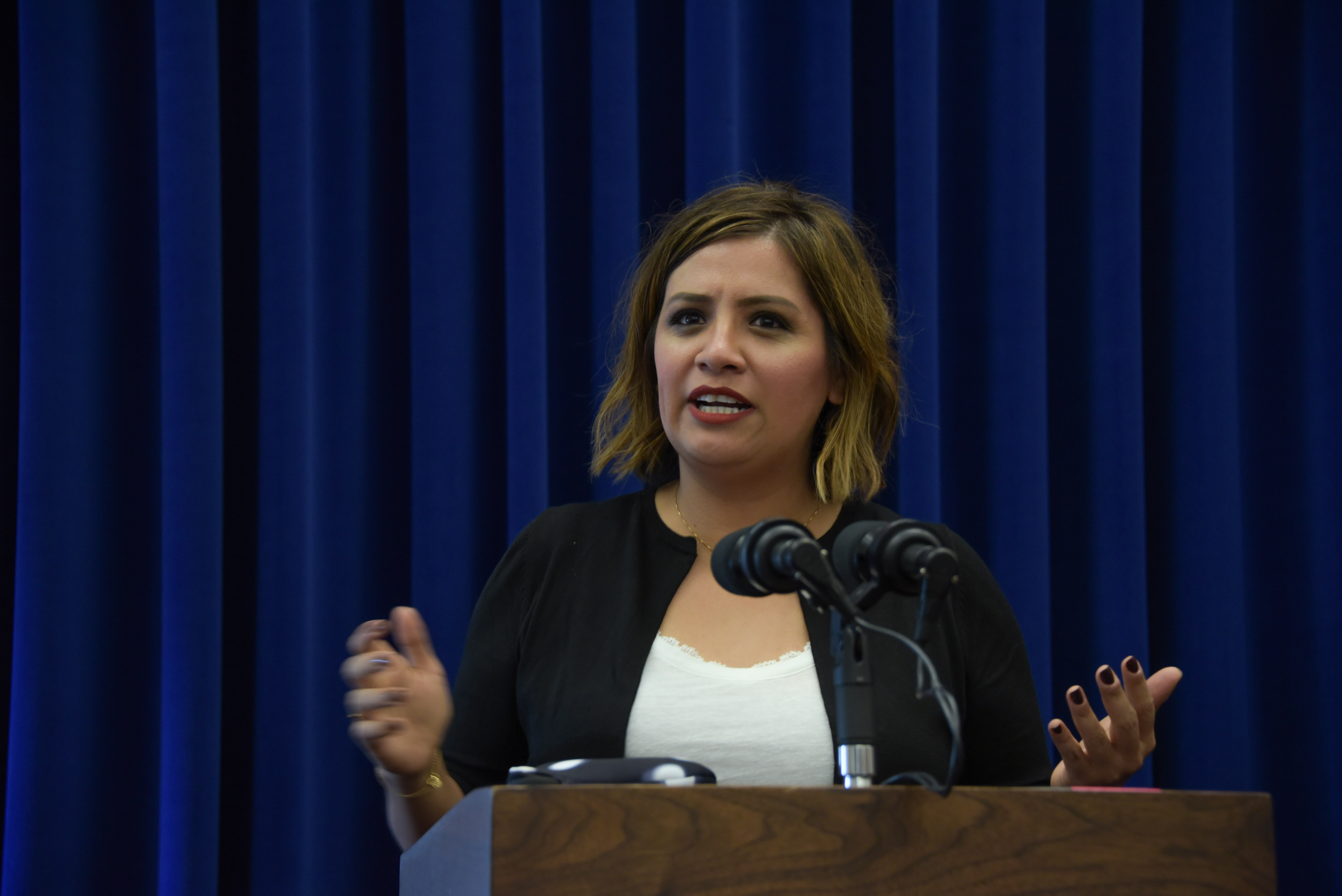
Alonzo in 2016

=== Post-Cristela ===
In 2017, Alonzo voiced the character of Cruz Ramirez in the Disney-Pixar film Cars 3.

In 2017, Alonzo released a Netflix stand-up special called Cristela Alonzo: Lower Classy.

In 2019, Alonzo published a memoir called Music to My Years: A Mixtape-Memoir of Growing Up and Standing Up. The memoir release is accompanied by a stand-up tour called My Affordable Care Act.

In 2020, in association with Vox Media Podcast Network, Alonzo hosted and voiced the 11-episode podcast Chicano Squad, which details the story of a five-man Latino homicide investigation squad who worked to resolve police injustice in the Houston area during the 1970s. The podcast first aired in December 2020 and recorded its final episode on March 16, 2021.

Alonzo is a frequent guest player on the game show 25 Words or Less.

In 2021, it was announced that Alonzo would host The CW's revival of the 1990s game show Legends of the Hidden Temple.

In 2022, Alonzo released a Netflix stand-up special called Cristela Alonzo: Middle Classy. In 2025, she followed that up with Cristela Alonzo: Upper Classy, also on Netflix. She was interviewed by Fresh Air's Terry Gross in September of 2025.

=== Comedic style ===
Alonzo has a trademark, raucous laugh: "If I’m laughing, you know I’m either very happy or very sad", she said. "I cope with things with jokes." She is an observational comic who reflects on stories in her own life, and was inspired by Bill Cosby and Roseanne Barr and her favorite childhood shows (The Cosby Show and Roseanne).

== Activism ==
After the 2016 election, Alonzo has stated that with the mentorship and encouragement of Dolores Huerta and poet Sonia Sanchez, she became more politically active, with a focus on immigration and healthcare. She supported Julian Castro for his 2020 presidential campaign. Alonzo has been outspoken as to the lack of representation of Latino candidate Castro on Saturday Night Live in their coverage of Democratic candidates. Julian Castro's twin brother Congressman Joaquin Castro introduced Alonzo on-stage on in-video in her 2022 comedy special Middle Classy, referring to her as "my badass friend".

Alonzo was criticized for celebrating the death of Rush Limbaugh on Twitter on February 17, 2021, when she tweeted out the post "Happy Rush Limbaugh is Dead Day. I didn't even get the chance to put my tree up!" She was further criticized for saying that she was "Not sorry...".

== Filmography ==
=== Film ===
| Year | Title | Role | Notes |
|---|---|---|---|
| 2013 | Hot Pursuit | Connie | Short film |
| 2016 | The Angry Birds Movie | Shirley | Voice |
| 2017 | Cars 3 | Cruz Ramirez | Voice |
| 2018 | That's Harassment | Costumer Dresser | Short film |
| 2019 | The Laundromat | Special Agent Kilmer | |
| 2020 | Coast | Debora Avila | |

=== Television ===
| Year | Title | Role | Notes |
|---|---|---|---|
| 2006 | Mind of Mencia | | Writer, 15 episodes |
| 2011 | Sons of Anarchy | Latin Woman | Episode: "Fruit for the Crows" |
| 2012 | Ladies Room Diaries | Bathroom Attendant | producer, writer, 3 episodes: "Rubik's Cubicle", "Okey Dokey Karaoke", "Hide n' Cake" |
| 2012 | Hey It's Fluffy! | | 4 episodes |
| 2012 | The Book Club | Cobra Chai / Cristela | Episodes: "The Warrior Reads On", "All Valley" |
| 2014–15 | Cristela | Cristela | 22 episodes, creator, executive producer, writer |
| 2015 | General Hospital | Natalia Rodriguez | 1 episode |
| 2019–22 | His Dark Materials | Hester | Voice role; Recurring role |
| 2020 | The Casagrandes | Camila | Voice role; episode: "Grandparent Trap" |
| 2021 | The Upshaws | Anna | 2 episode |
| 2021–22 | Legends of the Hidden Temple | Host | |
| 2021 | Earth to Ned | Herself | Episode: "Growing Up Ned" |
| 2021 | Launchpad | Lupe Garcia | Episode: "Growing Fangs" |
| 2022 | Cars on the Road | Cruz Ramirez | Voice role; episode: "Gettin' Hitched" |
| 2023 | Is It Cake? | Herself / Judge | Episode: "S'more Cake Please" |

=== Video games ===
- 2026: Disney Speedstorm, Cruz Ramirez

=== Shorts ===
- 2007: Carpet Diem, writer
- 2007: Cookie de Mayo, writer
- 2008: Life After, writer
- 2008: Recycled, writer
- 2009: TGIF: The Musical, writer, story
- 2011: The North Council, writer
- 2017: Miss Fritter's Racing Skoool, actor as Cruz Ramirez

=== Theme parks attractions ===
- 2021: Cars: Road Trip, Cruz Ramirez

=== Stand up ===
- 2007: Live at Gotham, episode: "Episode #2.7"
- 2009: Stand-Up 360: Muy Caliente Edition 2
- 2010: Ladies Night Out
- 2010: Last Comic Standing, episodes 7.7 and 7.1
- 2011: Gabriel Iglesias Presents Stand Up Revolution, episode: "Cristela Alonzo/Larry Omaha/Maz Jobrani"
- 2011: Legally Brown
- 2012: Conan, episode: "Dracula Meets the Mummy, & the Two Hit It Off Swimmingly"
- 2013: The Half Hour
- 2014: @midnight, episode 2.5
- 2014: Just for Laughs: All-Access, episode: "Jimmy Carr"
- 2014: Conan, episode 4.80
- 2017: Cristela Alonzo: Lower Classy Netflix standup special
- 2022: Cristela Alonzo: Middle Classy Netflix standup special
- 2025: Cristela Alonzo: Upper Classy Netflix standup special

== Works and publications ==
- Alonzo, Cristela (2019). Music to My Years: A Mixtape-Memoir of Growing Up and Standing Up. New York: Atria Books. ISBN 978-1-501-18920-3. OCLC 1121187767.

== Recognition ==
In January 2014, Alonzo was named as one of "10 L.A. Comedy Acts to Watch in 2014" by L.A. Weekly. She was also named one of "13 Funny Women to Watch in 2014" by Cosmopolitan. McAllen, Texas gave her the Key to the City in 2019.
