= Las Milpas, Pharr, Texas =

American colonia in Pharr, Texas

Las Milpas (Spanish: "the milpas (cornfields)") is a colonia in the City of Pharr, in central Hidalgo County, Texas in the Rio Grande Valley. It was previously an unincorporated area. Las Milpas is located off of U.S. Highway 281, 5 miles (8.0 km) south of the city center of Pharr, and between McAllen and the United States-Mexico border.

== History ==
Las Milpas, like many colonias, was established in the 1960s. In 1962 it had multiple dwellings, platted streets, and a church. By 1976 the community had 77 dwellings and about 424 residents.

In a period before 1987 the larger community had almost 5,000 residents. The community received media coverage that used it as an example of the lifestyles of residents in American colonias during the mid-to-late 1980s. In 1987 the City of Pharr annexed the community. Some residents of Las Milpas opposed the annexation. On December 19, 1987, the City of Pharr annexed the final 634 acres (257 ha) of Las Milpas.

In 1990 Las Milpas and Hidalgo Park, another colonia, had a combined population of 4,178. By 1995 the community had 12,000 residents. Chris Kelley of The Dallas Morning News wrote that year that Las Milpas "helps make the case that Pharr is the most distressed city in America."

Lynn Brezosky of the Associated Press wrote that Las Milpas and Pueblo de Palmas, around 1997, "were Calcutta on the Rio Grande, poverty-stricken places that became filthy, stinking, disease-ridden expanses awash in mud and sewage whenever it rained heavily." By 2007 the community grew to over 17,000 residents and many illegal immigrants in the community became U.S. citizens and began applying political pressure to the federal and state governments to get aid for the community. Brezosky wrote that Las Palmas's "transformation into a proud, largely well-tended community" was "an immigrant success story."

== Demographics ==
It was part of the Las Milpas-Hidalgo Park CDP which first appeared in the 1980 United States census. It was annexed to the city of Pharr prior to the 1990 U.S. census.

As of 2016 the area poverty rate was 62.1% and 40% of the inhabitants did not receive a high school diploma.

== Education ==
The Pharr-San Juan-Alamo Independent School District operates public schools. The South Pharr Elementary School was scheduled to open on September 3, 2007, after the start of the school year on August 27. In early 2013 it was renamed Carmen Anaya Elementary School after the co-founder of the Valley Interfaith organization. Persons zoned to Anaya are also zoned to Jaime Escalante Middle School and PJSA Southwest Early College High School.

Many children who reside in the Las Milpas area also attend schools in the Hidalgo Independent School District. J. C. Kelly Elementary School serves sections of Las Milpas in Hidalgo ISD. All residents of Hidalgo ISD are zoned to Ida Diaz Jr. High School and Hidalgo Early College High School.

Some children attend school in the Valley View Independent School District.

In addition, South Texas Independent School District operates magnet schools that serve the community.
