= Gerardo Reyes (baseball) =

Mexican baseball player (born 1993)

Diablos Rojos del México – No. 51
- Pitcher
- Born: May 13, 1993 (age 33); Ciudad Victoria, Mexico
- Bats: Right Throws: Right

MLB debut
- April 12, 2019, for the San Diego Padres

MLB statistics (through 2024 season)
- Win–loss record: 4–0
- Earned run average: 7.13
- Strikeouts: 50
- Stats at Baseball Reference

Teams
- San Diego Padres (2019); Los Angeles Angels (2022–2023); Oakland Athletics (2024)
Medals
Men's baseball
Representing Mexico
World Baseball Classic
Bronze medal – third place	2023 Miami	Team

Gerardo Reyes (born May 13, 1993) is a Mexican professional baseball pitcher for the Diablos Rojos del México of the Mexican League. He has previously played in Major League Baseball (MLB) for the San Diego Padres, Los Angeles Angels, and Oakland Athletics.

== Career ==
Reyes attended Hidalgo High School in Hidalgo, Texas. He attended Galveston College in Galveston, Texas. He appeared in four games his freshman season of 2013, but missed his sophomore season due to injury.

=== Tampa Bay Rays ===
Reyes signed as an undrafted free agent out of a tryout camp by the Tampa Bay Rays on August 11, 2013. He made his professional debut in 2014 with the Hudson Valley Renegades of the Low–A New York-Penn League, pitching to a 2–1 win–loss record with a 4.09 earned run average (ERA) in 33 innings pitched.

=== San Diego Padres ===
On December 19, 2014, Reyes was traded to the San Diego Padres in a three team trade between Tampa Bay, San Diego and the Washington Nationals that included Wil Myers, Trea Turner, and Steven Souza among the eleven players traded. After missing the 2015 season, he split the 2016 season between the Fort Wayne TinCaps of the Single–A Midwest League and the Lake Elsinore Storm of the High–A California League, accumulating a 4–5 with a 3.59 ERA in 52 2/3 innings. He spent 2017 back with Lake Elsinore, going 3–3 with a 2.63 ERA in 61 2/3 innings. He split the 2018 season between Lake Elsinore and the San Antonio Missions of the Double-A Texas League, accumulating a 1–3 with a 2.77 ERA in 55 innings.

The Padres added him to their 40-man roster after the 2018 season. He opened the 2019 season with the El Paso Chihuahuas of the Triple-A Pacific Coast League, going 4–2 with a 3.57 ERA over 45 1/3 innings. On April 12, 2019, he was promoted to the major leagues for the first time. He made his debut that night, pitching 2/3 innings in relief and earning the win. With the Padres in 2019, Reyes went 4–0 with a 7.62 ERA and 38 strikeouts over 26 innings.

=== Los Angeles Angels ===
On August 30, 2020, Reyes was traded to the Los Angeles Angels for Jason Castro. He did not play in a game for the Angels due to the cancellation of the minor league season because of the COVID-19 pandemic. On March 5, 2021, Reyes was outrighted off of the 40-man roster. After suffering a sprain of the ulnar collateral ligament of the elbow, on March 11, it was announced that Reyes would undergo Tommy John surgery and miss the 2021 season as a result. Reyes was assigned to the Triple-A Salt Lake Bees in 2022 upon his return from injury. In 46 appearances, he posted a 3-4 record and 3.74 ERA with 58 strikeouts and 6 saves in 45 2/3 innings pitched.

On August 26, 2022, Reyes was selected to the 40-man roster and added to the active roster. Taylor Ward, Aaron Loup, and Ryan Tepera were placed on the restricted list due to being unvaccinated against COVID-19 and were unable to travel to Canada to play the Toronto Blue Jays. Reyes allowed one run on three hits and three walks in two innings pitched across two relief appearances. He was removed from the 40-man roster and returned to Triple-A on August 29. He elected free agency following the season on November 10.

On December 19, 2022, Reyes re-signed with the Angels on a minor league contract. In 19 appearances for Triple–A Salt Lake in 2023, he logged a 4.64 ERA with 32 strikeouts in 21 1/3 innings pitched. On June 10, 2023, Reyes was added to major league roster after Ben Joyce was placed on the injured list. In 8 games for the Angels, he struggled to a 7.45 ERA with 10 strikeouts in 9 2/3 innings of work. On September 14, Reyes was designated for assignment by Los Angeles. He cleared waivers and was sent outright to Triple–A Salt Lake on September 17. Reyes elected free agency on October 13.

=== Oakland Athletics ===
On December 15, 2023, Reyes signed a minor league contract with the Oakland Athletics. In 31 appearances for the Triple–A Las Vegas Aviators, he recorded a 3.82 ERA with 48 strikeouts across 33 innings of work. On July 30, 2024, the Athletics selected Reyes' contract, adding him to their active roster. In 3 games for Oakland, he logged a 4.50 ERA with 2 strikeouts over 4 innings pitched. On August 7, Reyes was designated for assignment by the Athletics. He cleared waivers and was sent outright to Las Vegas on August 9. Reyes elected free agency on October 1.

=== Diablos Rojos del México ===
On March 3, 2025, Reyes signed with the Diablos Rojos del México of the Mexican League. He made 35 appearances for México, registering a 4-0 record and 6.68 ERA with 46 strikeouts across 33 2/3 innings pitched. With the team, Reyes won the Serie del Rey.
