= Pharr-San Juan-Alamo High School =

PSJA Early College High School
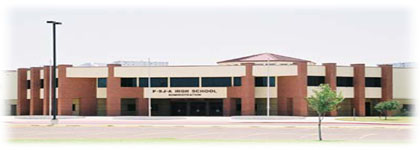

Location
- 805 West Ridge Road; San Juan, Texas; United States
- Coordinates: 26.17681°N 98.16835°W

Information
- Type: Public
- Established: 1919
- School district: Pharr-San Juan-Alamo Independent School District
- Principal: Dr. Rowdy Vela
- Staff: 145.52 (FTE)
- Grades: 9-12
- Enrollment: 2,239 (2017-18)
- Student to teacher ratio: 15.39
- Colors: Maroon & White
- Mascot: Bear
- Website: www.psjaisd.us/bears

Pharr-San Juan-Alamo (PSJA) Early College High School is a public school in San Juan, Texas (United States). It is part of the Pharr-San Juan-Alamo Independent School District and is one of the district's six high schools. It educates over 2,500 students.

== Student demographics ==
As of the 2007–2008 school year, PSJA High had a total of 2,528 students (98.7% Hispanic, 1.1% White, 0.1% African American, and less than 0.1% Native American). 90.6% of the students are considered economically disadvantaged.

== Attendance area and feeder patterns ==
The school's attendance boundary includes much of San Juan, as well as the PSJAISD section of the census-designated place of Lopezville.

Feeder elementary schools include Arnold Cantu, Carman, Clover, Doedyns, Garza-Pena, Reed Mock, and Sorenson. Feeder middle schools include Austin and R. Yzaguirre.

== Accountability rating ==
Based on the accountability ratings released by the Texas Education Agency on August 2, 2007, PSJA High is currently rated "Academically Acceptable". The school has received a TEA Recognized Campus status as of 2008.

== Extra Curriculums ==
- Drill Team
- Baseball
- Basketball
- Cross Country
- Football
- Powerlifting
- Golf
- Soccer
- Softball
- Tennis
- Track
- Volleyball
- Wrestling
- Band
- Theater
1. PSJA High School is the only high school in the Rio Grande Valley area to go to the Texas State Championship back to back during the years of 1962 and 1963.

== Notable alumni ==
- Cristela Alonzo
- David Barrera

== See also ==
- Pharr-San Juan-Alamo Memorial High School
- Pharr-San Juan-Alamo North High School
