= Pharr-San Juan-Alamo North High School =

Public school in Texas, United States

PSJA North Early College High School

Location
- 500 East Nolana Loop; Pharr, Texas; United States

Information
- Type: Public
- School district: Pharr-San Juan-Alamo Independent School District
- Principal: Liza Diaz
- Staff: 154.03 (FTE)
- Grades: 9-12
- Enrollment: 2,162 (2017-18)
- Student to teacher ratio: 14.04
- Colors: Black & silver
- Mascot: Raider
- Website: www.psjaisd.us/raiders

Pharr-San Juan-Alamo North Early College High School is a public school in Pharr, Texas (United States). It is part of the Pharr-San Juan-Alamo Independent School District and is one of the district's six high schools. It is classified as a 6A school by the UIL. For the 2024-2025 school year, the school received an overall rating of "A" from the Texas Education Agency.

Located at 500 E. Nolana Loop, the school serves students in grades nine through twelve.

== Student demographics ==
As of the 2005–2006 school year, PSJA North had a total of 2,209 students (98.2% Hispanic, 1.4% White, 0.3% African American, and less than 0.1% Asian/Pacific Islander). 86.6% of the students are considered economically disadvantaged.

== Attendance area and feeder patterns ==
The school's attendance boundary includes most of Pharr and sections of McAllen.

Feeder elementary schools include Arnold, Ford, Kelly-Pharr, Dr. Long, Longoria, Palmer, and Ramirez. Feeder middle schools include Lyndon B. Johnson and Liberty.

== National recognition ==
PSJA North High School was one of the three recipients of the College Board's Inspiration Award in 2011. Former principal Narciso Garcia, several teachers, and two seniors represented the school at the College Board's annual forum in New York City in October 2011. The two seniors delivered speeches in front of over 2,000 educators from across the nation.

== See also ==
- Pharr-San Juan-Alamo High School
- Pharr-San Juan-Alamo Memorial High School

== Notable alumni ==
Roger Huerta — MMA fighter with the UFC and Bellator
