= Granjeno, Texas =

- City
- Location of Granjeno, Texas

- Location within Texas Location within the United States
- Coordinates: 26°8′18″N 98°18′13″W
- Country: United States
- State: Texas
- County: Hidalgo

Government
  - Mayor: Yvette Cabrera

Area
  - Total: 0.31 sq mi (0.79 km^{2})
  - Land: 0.31 sq mi (0.79 km^{2})
  - Water: 0 sq mi (0.00 km^{2})
- Elevation: 108 ft (33 m)

Population (2020)
  - Total: 283
  - Density: 930.9/sq mi (359.43/km^{2})
- Time zone: UTC-6 (Central (CST))
  - Summer (DST): UTC-5 (CDT)
- ZIP code: 78572
- Area code: 956
- FIPS code: 48-30608
- GNIS feature ID: 1336821
- Website: cityofgranjeno.com

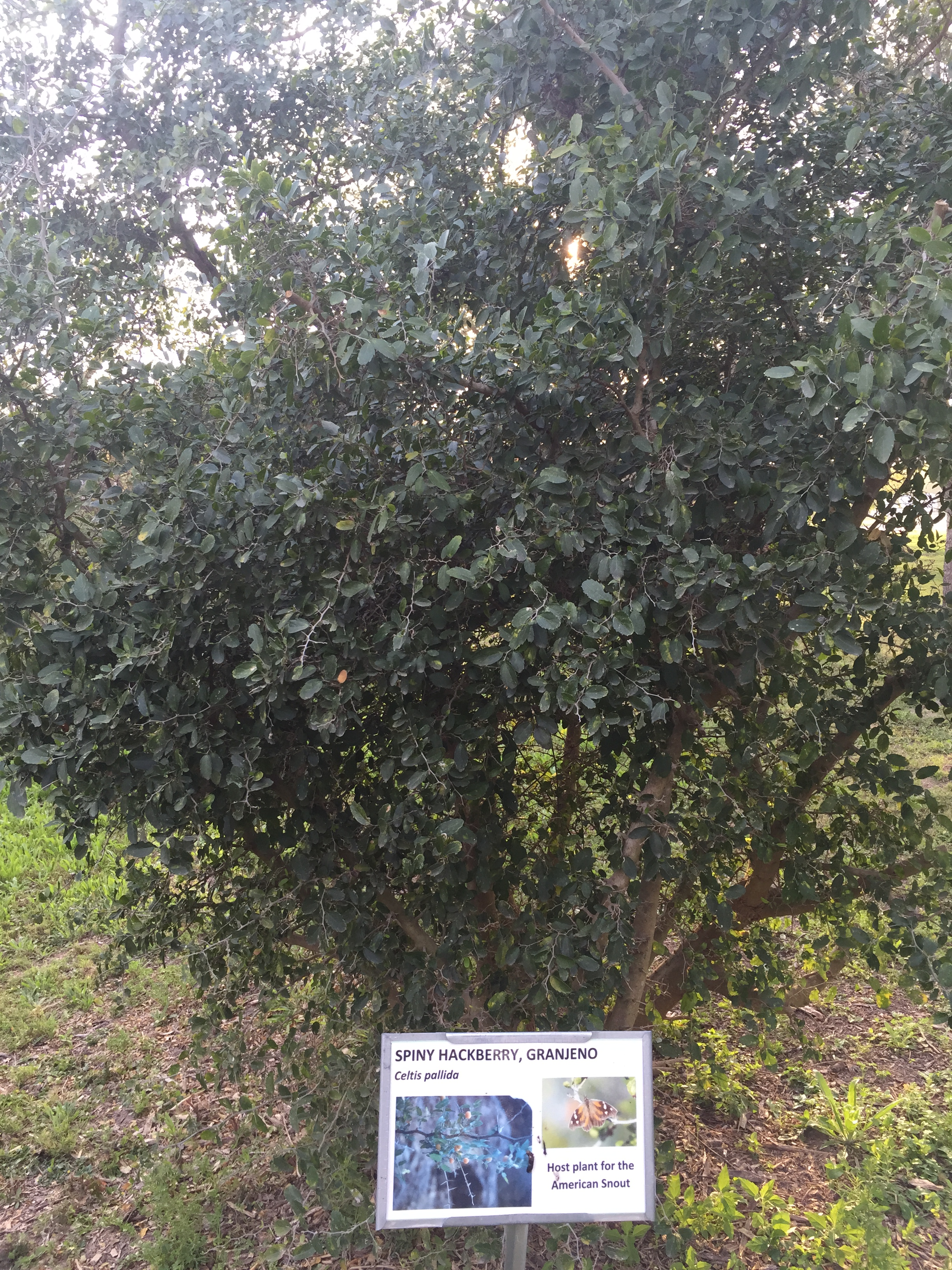
Spiny hackberry or granjeno (Celtis pallida)

Granjeno is a city in Hidalgo County, Texas, United States. The population was 283 at the 2020 census. The city sits on the banks of the Rio Grande, near the border with Mexico. Its name comes from the granjeno tree (Celtis pallida) or spiny hackberry.

== History ==
Founded in the late 18th century, Granjeno has a history that predates Texas statehood. Granjeno Cemetery was established in 1872 with burials from both sides of the Rio Grande. By the mid-1930s, the community consisted of several dwellings. A school established in Granjeno by 1948. Our Lady of Fatima Church was established in 1954 on land donated by Jose Concepcion Anzaldua. During the 1960s, growth in the community was stimulated by the development of a colonia. The population was estimated at 545 in 1976. Ten years later, that figure had decreased to 450. On January 26, 1993, Granjeno was incorporated as a city. The population was just over 300 in 2000. Mayor (Yvette Cabrera) and two commissioners (Jennifer Alvarez and Mike Cisneros)

Granjeno is adjacent to the Anzalduas County Park, which is known for its moss-covered trees. Construction on the nearby Anzalduas International Bridge began in mid-2007 and the bridge became operational in late 2009.

El Granjeno Cemetery (Texas Historic Landmark) was established in 1872 with the burial of Don Antonio Garza. His brother, Don Juan Garza Escheverria, donated the surrounding land for use by the communities of El Granjeno and nearby Madero. A native of Reynosa, Mexico, Don Juan (born 1854) is buried there, along with many of his descendants. Specific instructions were spelled out in historic documents that the rear of the cemetery was to be reserved only for the burial of direct descendants of Don Juan Garza Escheverria. Also interred there are veterans of the Civil War, World War I and the Vietnam War.

== Geography ==
Granjeno is situated off the junction of FM 494 and Old Military Road in southern Hidalgo County, approximately four miles southwest of McAllen. According to the United States Census Bureau, the city has a total area of 0.3 square miles (0.78 km^{2}), all land.

== Demographics ==
Historical population
Census	Pop.	Note	%±
2000	313		—
2010	293		−6.4%
2020	283		−3.4%
U.S. Decennial Census

Granjeno is part of the McAllen–Edinburg–Mission and Reynosa–McAllen metropolitan areas.

=== 2020 census ===
As of the 2020 census, Granjeno had a population of 283. The median age was 35.9 years. 24.7% of residents were under the age of 18 and 12.0% of residents were 65 years of age or older. For every 100 females there were 93.8 males, and for every 100 females age 18 and over there were 86.8 males age 18 and over.

92.9% of residents lived in urban areas, while 7.1% lived in rural areas.

There were 89 households in Granjeno, of which 39.3% had children under the age of 18 living in them. Of all households, 37.1% were married-couple households, 24.7% were households with a male householder and no spouse or partner present, and 30.3% were households with a female householder and no spouse or partner present. About 18.0% of all households were made up of individuals and 6.8% had someone living alone who was 65 years of age or older.

There were 97 housing units, of which 8.2% were vacant. The homeowner vacancy rate was 0.0% and the rental vacancy rate was 0.0%.

Racial composition as of the 2020 census
Race	Number	Percent
White	128	45.2%
Black or African American	0	0.0%
American Indian and Alaska Native	2	0.7%
Asian	0	0.0%
Native Hawaiian and Other Pacific Islander	1	0.4%
Some other race	47	16.6%
Two or more races	105	37.1%
Hispanic or Latino (of any race)	275	97.2%

=== 2000 census ===
At the 2000 census, there were 313 people, 93 households and 77 families residing in the city. The population density was 896.2 inhabitants per square mile (346.0/km^{2}). There were 107 housing units at an average density of 306.4 per square mile (118.3/km^{2}). The racial makeup of the city was 97.44% White, 0.32% Asian, 1.92% from other races, and 0.32% from two or more races. Hispanic or Latino of any race were 99.36% of the population.

There were 93 households, of which 46.2% had children under the age of 18 living with them, 57.0% were married couples living together, 21.5% had a female householder with no husband present, and 17.2% were non-families. 17.2% of all households were made up of individuals, and 11.8% had someone living alone who was 65 years of age or older. The average household size was 3.37 and the average family size was 3.81.

33.9% of the population were under the age of 18, 10.2% from 18 to 24, 28.8% from 25 to 44, 15.3% from 45 to 64, and 11.8% who were 65 years of age or older. The median age was 30 years. For every 100 females, there were 90.9 males. For every 100 females age 18 and over, there were 80.0 males.

The median household income was $19,423 and the median family income was $19,904. Males had a median income of $16,705 and females $21,250. The per capita income was $9,022. About 40.4% of families and 51.5% of the population were below the poverty line, including 71.7% of those under age 18 and 39.6% of those age 65 or over.

== Education ==
Public education in the city of Granjeno is provided by the Hidalgo Independent School District. It is zoned to Salinas Elementary School, Ida Diaz Jr. High School, and Hidalgo Early College High School.

In addition, South Texas Independent School District operates magnet schools that serve the community.
