= David Barrera =

American actor (born 1968)

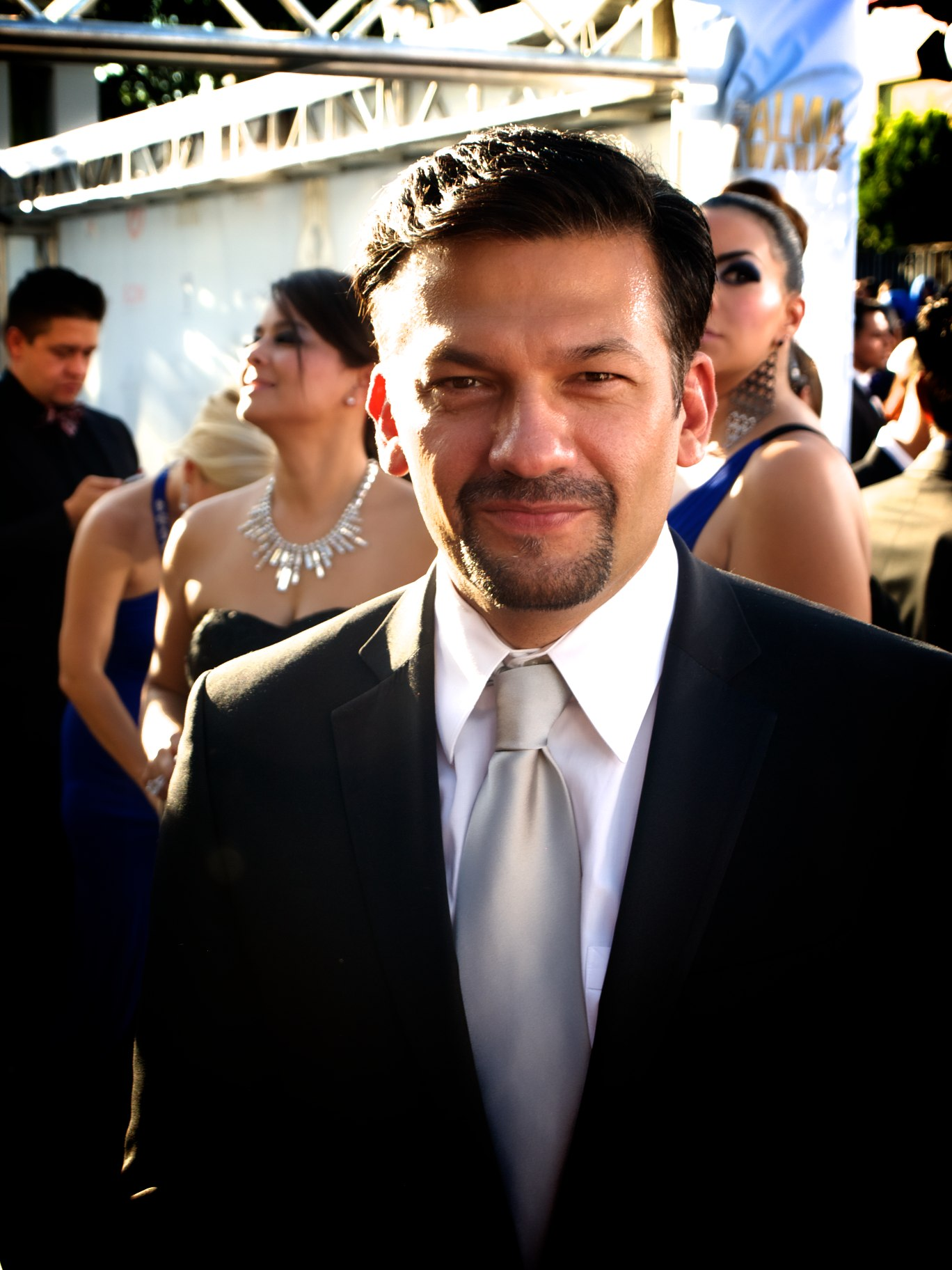
- Barrera at the 2012 ALMA Awards
- Born: David Joel Barrera; December 28, 1968 (age 57); San Juan, Texas, U.S.
- Education: Southern Methodist University (BFA); University of California, San Diego (MFA)
- Occupation: Actor
- Years active: 1990–present
- Spouse: Maria Canals (m. 1999)
- Children: 2
- Website: Official website

David Joel Barrera (born December 28, 1968) is an American actor. He is best known for his role as Gunnery Sgt. Ray 'Casey Kasem' Griego in Generation Kill. He has appeared in television series including Grimm, Heroes, CSI: Miami, Boston Legal, Medium, Nip/Tuck, NYPD Blue, Murder One, Without a Trace, The West Wing, The Big Bang Theory and 24 for which he got nominated for an ALMA Award.

Barrera is a graduate of Pharr-San Juan-Alamo High School in his hometown, San Juan, Texas, where he was part of the Theater Club. This high school is part of the Pharr-San Juan-Alamo Independent School District. Barrera is a graduate of Southern Methodist University, and went on to study in the graduate acting program at the University of California, San Diego. He is currently an Adjunct Faculty member teaching acting at Azusa Pacific University.

Barrera appeared in Universal's family comedy Evan Almighty, further he worked on films like Infinity, No Way Back and The United States of Leland (First Officer).

Barrera guest starred in the episode, "Alex Gives Up", as Carlos Cucuy in a Disney Channel Original Series live-action sitcom, Wizards of Waverly Place in which his wife, Maria, was one of the main cast members. In 2015, Barrera guest starred in the episode, "Flicker", as Dr. Kaplan in the fifth season of American Horror Story.

== Personal life ==
Barrera has been married to fellow actress Maria Canals since 1999, and they have two daughters, Bridget and Madeleine.

== Filmography ==
=== Film ===
Year	Title	Role	Notes
1995	Now Way Back	FBI Agent Brodie	
1996	Eye for an Eye	Precinct Officer	
1996	Infinity	Chepa	
1998	Almost Heroes	Ferdinand	
1999	My Little Assassin	Figueroa	Television film
2000	Ballad of a Soldier	Johnny	
2001	The Barrio Murders	Richards	
2003	The United States of Leland	First Officer	
2003	Perfect Girl	Sonny	Short film
2005	How the Garcia Girls Spent Their Summer	Sal's Uncle	
2005	Girls Never Call	Luis	
2007	Evan Almighty	Ark Reporter	
2009	Cruzando	The Matador	Also associate producer
2010	Boyle Heights	Frank	
2011	Bright	Nunez	Short film
2011	Carbone: Breaking Point	Juarez	Short film
2012	The Asset	Roberto Serrano	Television film
2013	Night of the Hipsters	Dick	Short film
2014	Death Clique	Mr. Ramirez	Television film
2014	10.0 Earthquake	Hector	
2014	The Curious Story of Spurious Falls	Man on the Hill	
2015	I Am Gangster	Carlos	
2015	Schmoolie the Deathwatcher	Burro	Short film
2016	2 Lava 2 Lantula!	Colombian Thug #2	Television film
2016	Run the Tide	T.J.	
2017	Perception	Hector Jimenez	Short film
2018	Crave: The Fast Life	Antonio	
2018	Ready Player One	Guy on Bus	Uncredited
2021	No One Gets Out Alive	Beto	
2022	Strong Fathers, Strong Daughters	Carlos Flores	
2022	Swamp Lion	Fatboy	

=== Television ===
Year	Title	Role	Notes
1995	First Time Out	David	2 episodes
1996	Space: Above and Beyond	2nd Lieutenant James Herrick	Episode: "Toy Soldiers"
1996	Moloney	Paul	Episode: "Pilot"
1996–97	L.A. Firefighters	Captain Aleman	2 episodes
1997	Renegade	Carlos	Episode: "Top Ten with a Bullet"
1997	Diagnosis Murder	Eddie Moreno	Episode: "Blood Brothers Murder"
1997	Murder One	Richard Higueras	4 episodes
1997	Pensacola: Wings of Gold	Miguel Toledo	Episode: "Yesterday, Upon the Stair...: Part 2"
1997	The Pretender	Fernando Ramos	Episode: "Back from the Dead Again"
1997	Murder One: Diary of a Serial Killer	Richard Higueras	Miniseries (6 episodes)
1998	Four Corners	George	Episode: "Betrayals"
1998	NYPD Blue	Dr. Sampson	Episode: "I Don’t Wanna Dye"
1998–2001	NYPD Blue	Dr. Victor Carreras	Recurring role (6 episodes)
1999	Millennium	Sheriff Tommy Briggs	Episode: "Nostalgia"
1999	JAG	Lieutenant Achuleta	Episode: "True Callings"
2000	Pacific Blue	Unknown role	Episode: "A Thousand Words"
2000	City of Angels	Father Carillo	2 episodes
2001	Strong Medicine	Charlie Perez	Episode: "Maternity"
2001	Family Law	Unknown role	Episode: "LIar's Club: Part 1"
2001	That's Life	Sanchez	3 episodes
2001	24	Philips	Episode: "4:00 a.m.–5:00 a.m."
2002	American Family	David	Episode: "The Star"
2002	The Division	Daniel Torres	Episode: "Full Moon"
2002	ER	Felix Hernandez	Episode: "Walk Like a Man"
2003	Nip/Tuck	Policeman	Episode: "Megan O'Hara"
2003	Without a Trace	Gorge Rodriguez	Episode: "A Tree Falls"
2004	CSI: NY	Jose Figueroa	Episode: "Outside Man"
2005	Boston Legal	Office Joe Garrett	Episode: "Tortured Souls"
2005	Justice League Unlimited	Thanagarian #2 (voice)	Episode: "Hunter's Moon"
2005	Medium	Fr. Santiago	Episode: "The Song Remains the Same"
2005	Veronica Mars	Carlos Oliveres	Episode: "Ahoy, Mateys!"
2006	The West Wing	Jorge Santos	Episode: "Running Mates"
2006	CSI: Miami	Lorenzo Argenta	Episode: "Death Eminent"
2006–08	Shark	Medical Examiner Mickey Cuz-Alvarez	3 episodes
2007	NCIS	Charlie Mills	Episode: "Sharif Returns"
2007	Heroes	Federal Agent Quesda	Episode: "Chapter Eighteen 'Parasite'"
2007	Smith	David Owens	2 episodes
2008	Ylse	Rick	Unknown episodes
2008	Generation Kill	Gunnery Sergeant Ray "Casey Kasem" Griego	Recurring role (7 episodes)
2008	The Closer	Commandante Martin Vasquez	Episode: "Tijuana Brass"
2009	Raising the Bar	Alberto Capulet	Episode: "Beating a Dead Horse"
2009	Three Rivers	Unknown role	Episode: "Ryan's First Day"
2010	The Mentalist	Frank Rodriguez	Episode: "Blood in, BLood Out"
2010	In Plain Sight	Jack Suarez	Episode: "Her Days Are Numbered"
2010	Wizards of Waverly Place	Carlos Cucuy	Episode: "Alex Gives Up"
2011	Human Target	Julio Escalante	Episode: "A Problem Like Maria"
2011	The Defenders	Detective Fierro	Episode: "Nevada v. Dough the Mule"
2011	Generator Rex	Esteban (voice)	2 episodes
2011	The Trainee	Shadow Knight	3 episodes
2012	Southland	Officer Jim Lopez	2 episodes
2012	Fairly Legal	Eddie Salinas	Episode: "Gimme Shelter"
2012	Grimm	Luis	Episode: "La Llorona"
2014	The Night Shift	Detective Gonzalez	Episode: "Save Me"
2014	The Big Bang Theory	Officer Hernandez	Episode: "The Locomotion Interruption"
2014	The Bridge	Domingo	Recurring role (6 episodes)
2014	Castle	Principle Joe Silva	Episode: "Child's Play"
2014	I Didn't Do It	Officer Rivera	Episode: "Bicycle Thief"
2015	Mom	Gary	Episode: "Benito Poppins and a Warm Pumpkin"
2015	American Horror Story	Doctor Kaplan	Episode: "Flicker"
2016	NCIS: Los Angeles	Captain Vargas	Episode: "Where There's Smoke..."
2016	Gamer's Guide to Pretty Much Everything	Sheriff	Episode: "The Luchador"
2016	Shut Eye	Mike Diaz	2 episodes
2017	Criminal Minds	Mario Casteneda	Episode: "Spencer"
2017	The Orville	Vasquez	Episode: "About a Girl"
2017	Chance	Detective Sid Velerio	3 episodes
2018	Bosch	Detective Stan Pipes	Recurring role (4 episodes)
2018	Animal Kingdom	Jeff Stewart	Episode: "Prey"
2018	Dirty John	Palmer	Episode: "Approachable Dreams"
2019	SEAL Team	Jeff Walker	Episode: "Things Not Seen"
2019	What/If	Javi Ruiz	Recurring role (4 episodes)
2020	Selena: The Series	Hector	Episode: "Daydream"
2021	PEN15	Dr. Robins	Episode: "Grammy"
2022	Killing It	Carlos	2 episodes
2022	Dahmer – Monster: The Jeffrey Dahmer Story	Chief Arreola	Recurring role

=== Theatre ===
Year	Play Title	Role	Director	Theatre	Playwright
2001	A Bicycle Country	Pepe	Richard Hochberg	Marilyn Monroe Theatre at the Lee Strasberg Creative Center	Nilo Cruz
unknown	Street of the Sun			Taper, Too	
unknown	The Seductions of Johnny Diego			Taper, Too	

=== Video games ===
Year	Title	Role	Notes
2003	Need for Speed: Underground	Jose	
2005	Midnight Club 3: Dub Edition	Oscar	
2005	Ridge Racer 6	Actor	
2006	Saints Row	Stilwater's Resident	

== Awards ==
While at the University of California, San Diego graduate acting program, Barrera was awarded the Princess Grace Award in acting.
