= Cali Carranza =

American singer

Cali Carranza (March 29, 1953 – May 1, 2012) was an American Tejano (Spanish for "Texan") musician. Born in Pharr, Texas he began playing the drums and accordion in his father's band at eight years old. Carranza joined Conjunto Bernal in 1973, before becoming a founding member of Roberto Pulido y Los Clasicos. In 1976, Carranza formed his own band, Los Formales, with his brothers, Nito and Ruben.

Los Formales recorded several albums and were known for their harmonies and live performances. Cali Carranza won awards for Song of the Year 1983, 1985 and 1994. He also received nominations for multiple awards including Tejano Band of the Year, Album of the Year, Male Vocalist of the Year, Song of the Year and Video of the Year from various Tejano music outlets. In 2009, he was inducted into the Tejano Roots Hall of Fame and 2010, he received the Tejano Music Academy's Lifetime Achievement Award.

On May 1, 2012, Cali Carranza died at the age of 59 after a protracted battle with ALS (Amyotrophic lateral sclerosis), also known as Lou Gherig's disease.
