= Hidalgo Independent School District =

School district in Texas, United States

Address
- 324 East Flora Street Hidalgo, Texas, 78557; United States

District information
- Grades: PK–12
- Schools: 6
- NCES District ID: 4823100

Students and staff
- Students: 3,019 (2023–2024)
- Teachers: 218.19 (on an FTE basis)
- Student–teacher ratio: 13.84:1

Other information
- Website: www.hidalgo-isd.org

The Hidalgo Independent School District is a public school district based in Hidalgo, Texas, United States. The district serves most of Hidalgo and the city of Granjeno as well as small portions of McAllen, Pharr (including sections of Las Milpas), and San Juan. It southern boundary is the Rio Grande along the U.S.-Mexico border. It serves many colonias.

In 2009, the school district was rated "academically acceptable" by the Texas Education Agency.

In 2018, J.C. Kelly Elementary was named a Blue Ribbon School by U.S. Department of Education.

== Schools ==
=== High schools ===
- Grades 9-12
  - Hidalgo Early College High School
  - Hidalgo Academy (Alternative school)

=== Junior high school ===
- Grades 6-8
  - Ida Diaz Junior High School

=== Elementary schools ===
- Grades PK-5
  - Hidalgo Elementary School
  - Hidalgo Park Elementary School
  - J.C. Kelly Elementary School
  - Dr. Alejo Salinas, Jr. Elementary School

== History ==
Hidalgo's first school was established in 1852. Schools were also established in the nearby communities of Junco, Capote, and Granjeno during the late 19th century. The Hidalgo Independent School District was created in 1925 by the Texas Legislature. Its boundaries, covering a thirty-six square mile area, were established at that time as well. Hidalgo ISD remained small and by the 1950s, the district made arrangements to transport high school students to neighboring McAllen ISD for their studies. As enrollment increased, however, a new Hidalgo High School was constructed and opened in 1976, serving grades 7-12.

Ida Diaz Junior High School and the district's second elementary campus (J.C. Kelly Elementary School) opened in the 1980s.

Growth slowed in the 1990s, due in part to the completion of a new high school in neighboring Valley View ISD. Students from that district had attended Hidalgo High since it was reestablished in 1976.

Dr. Alejo Salinas Jr. Elementary School opened in 1999. District enrollment topped 3,000 for the first time during the 2002-03 school year. An alternative high school, Hidalgo Academy, was established soon after and a fourth elementary campus (Hidalgo Park) opened in August 2004. Frequent renovations and other improvements have been made to accommodate the growing student population.

== Student demographics ==
The website City-Data.com stated that about 33% of the families in the district lived below the poverty line.

The following figures are as of the 2007-08 school year.

- Total District Enrollment: 3,395
- Student enrollment by campus
  - Hidalgo High School (893)
  - Ida Diaz Junior High School (696)
  - Hidalgo Elementary School (480)
  - Hidalgo Park Elementary School (421)
  - J.C. Kelly Elementary School (442)
  - Dr. Alejo Salinas Jr. Elementary School (423)
  - Hidalgo Academy (40)
- Student enrollment by ethnicity
  - Hispanic: 3,383 (99.65%)
  - White: 6 (0.18%)
  - African American: 4 (0.12%)
  - Asian/Pacific Islander: 2 (0.06%)
- Students by socio-economic status
  - Economically Disadvantaged: 3,050 (89.84%)
  - Limited English Proficient: 1,903 (56.05%)
  - Students w/Disciplinary Placements (2006–07): 29 (0.85%)
  - At-Risk: 2,445 (72.02%)

== See also ==
- List of school districts in Texas
