= Pharr-San Juan-Alamo Independent School District =

School district in Texas, United States

Address
- 601 E. Kelly Pharr, Texas, 78577; United States

District information
- Type: Public
- Grades: Pre-K–12
- Established: 1919; 107 years ago
- President: Jorge Zambrano
- Superintendent: Dr. Alejandro Elias
- Schools: Pre-K/Elementary: 27; Middle: 8; High: 6; Special purpose: 3
- NCES District ID: 4834860
- District ID: TX-108909

Students and staff
- Students: 32,682 (2018–19)
- Teachers: 2,148.32 (FTE) (2018–19)
- Student–teacher ratio: 15.21:1 (2018–19)

Other information
- Website: www.psjaisd.us

Pharr-San Juan-Alamo Independent School District is a public school district based in Pharr, Texas, United States in the Rio Grande Valley.

The district serves Pharr, San Juan, and Alamo, as well as a small portion of McAllen. PSJA ISD's total student enrollment for 2010 was 31,329 according to the Texas Education Agency's website. In 2009, the school district was rated "academically acceptable" by the Texas Education Agency. PSJA ISD's current superintendent is Dr. Jorge Arredondo.

In 2018, Carman Elementary in San Juan and Chavez Elementary in Pharr were named National Education Association Blue Ribbon Schools.

== History ==
On March 15, 1919, Common School District No. 4 in Hidalgo County became Pharr-San Juan Independent School District. Forty years later, Alamo merged with the district, establishing what is now known as the Pharr-San Juan-Alamo Independent School District, which serves over 31,000 students in the area.

PBS NewsHour showcased PSJA ISD nationally in a two-part series featuring the district's dropout recovery program success and early college high school work (July 2012).

On June 6, 2007, The Dallas Morning News reported that Arturo Guajardo, the superintendent of PSJA ISD, and board members Raul Navarro, Evangelina De Leon, and Rogelio Rodriguez, were indicted on corruption charges. On January 24, 2011, former PSJA superintendent Arturo Guajardo and board members Rogelio "Little Roy" Rodriguez, Rogelio "Big Roy" Navarro, and Evangelina "Vangie" De Leon pled guilty and were sentenced to probation, fines, and prison terms. Also, Arnulfo "Arnie" Olivarez (former insurance agent) and George Hernandez (former Donna ISD board president) pleaded guilty and were sentenced to probation, fines, and prison term for their role in the bribery and extortion scandal involving PSJA ISD's finances.

== Service area ==
The district serves portions of the cities of Pharr, San Juan, Alamo, and McAllen, as well as the census-designated place (CDP) of North Alamo, and a portion of the Lopezville CDP.

== Student information ==
In 2010, the district had 32,000 students, and in 2012 8,000 of them were attending senior high school.

As of 2012, the student body at PSJA ISD was 99% Hispanic, and 41% of the students were classified as English as a second language (ESL) students; with Spanish being the language spoken at home.

== TEA Academic Status ==
For the 2009–2010 school year, the Texas Education Agency designated 11 PSJA campuses with an "Exemplary" status and 19 as "Recognized", and the district was also designated as a "Recognized" School District.

== Curriculum ==
By 2012, PSJA ISD began using an early college model to encourage university admission among first-time, low-income, Hispanic, and ESL students. It is a model derived from that of the Hidalgo Independent School District; Superintendent Daniel P. King spearheaded this effort. After the initiative started, PSJA ISD had an increase in its university matriculation rates, and in a three-year span, the four-year graduation rate from the high schools increased to 87% as of 2012 from 62%. By 2012, about 2,000 students, making up 25% of all PSJA ISD high school students, took university-level courses.

PSJA has been identified as a national model for putting dropouts “Back on Track to College” by Jobs for the Future (JFF) out of Boston, MA. JFF is working to expand key components of the model to other states across the country. They also released a report in March 2012 featuring PSJA's College3 initiative and “College for All” strategy.

PSJA ISD has increased the number of yearly graduates by almost 100% from 966 in 2006–07 to over 1,900 in 2011–2012.

== Schools ==
=== High schools (grades 9-12) ===
- Pharr-San Juan-Alamo Early College High School (San Juan)
- Pharr-San Juan-Alamo Memorial Early College High School (Alamo)
- Pharr-San Juan-Alamo North Early College High School (Pharr)
- Pharr-San Juan-Alamo Southwest Early College High School (Pharr)
- Pharr-San Juan-Alamo Thomas Jefferson T-STEM Early College High School (Pharr)
- Pharr-San Juan-Alamo Daniel P. King Collegiate Early College High School (San Juan)

=== Middle schools (grades 6-8) ===
- Alamo Middle School (Alamo)
- Austin Middle School (San Juan)
- Audie Murphy Middle School (Alamo)
- Jaime Escalante Middle School (Pharr)
- Kennedy Middle School (Pharr)
- LBJ Middle School (Pharr)
- Liberty Middle School (Pharr)
- R. Yzaguirre Middle School (San Juan)

=== Elementary schools (prekindergarten - grade 5) ===
- PSJA Early Start Pre-K School (Pharr)
- Allen & William Arnold Elementary School (Pharr)
- Bowie Elementary School (Alamo)
- Buckner Elementary School (Pharr)
- Carman Elementary School (San Juan)
- Chavez Elementary School (Pharr)
- Clover Elementary School (San Juan)
- Doedyns Elementary School (San Juan)
- Dr. William Long Elementary School (Pharr)
- Farias Elementary School (Alamo)
- Ford Elementary School (Pharr)
- Marcia R. Garza Elementary School (Alamo)
- Garcia Elementary School (Pharr)
- Garza-Pena Elementary School (San Juan)
- Guerra Elementary School (Alamo)
- Kelly-Pharr Elementary School (Pharr)
- Long Elementary School (Pharr)
- Longoria Elementary School (Pharr)
- Napper Elementary School (Pharr)
- Santos Livas Elementary School (Alamo)
- Arnoldo Cantu Sr. Elementary School (San Juan)
- Palmer Elementary School (Pharr)
- Ramirez Elementary School (Pharr)
- Reed & Mock Elementary School (San Juan)
- Sorensen Elementary School (San Juan)
- South Pharr Elementary (Pharr)
- Trevino Elementary School (San Juan)
- Aida C. Escobar Elementary School (Pharr)
