= Rossy Evelin Lima =

Mexican-American writer, scholar, translator and activist

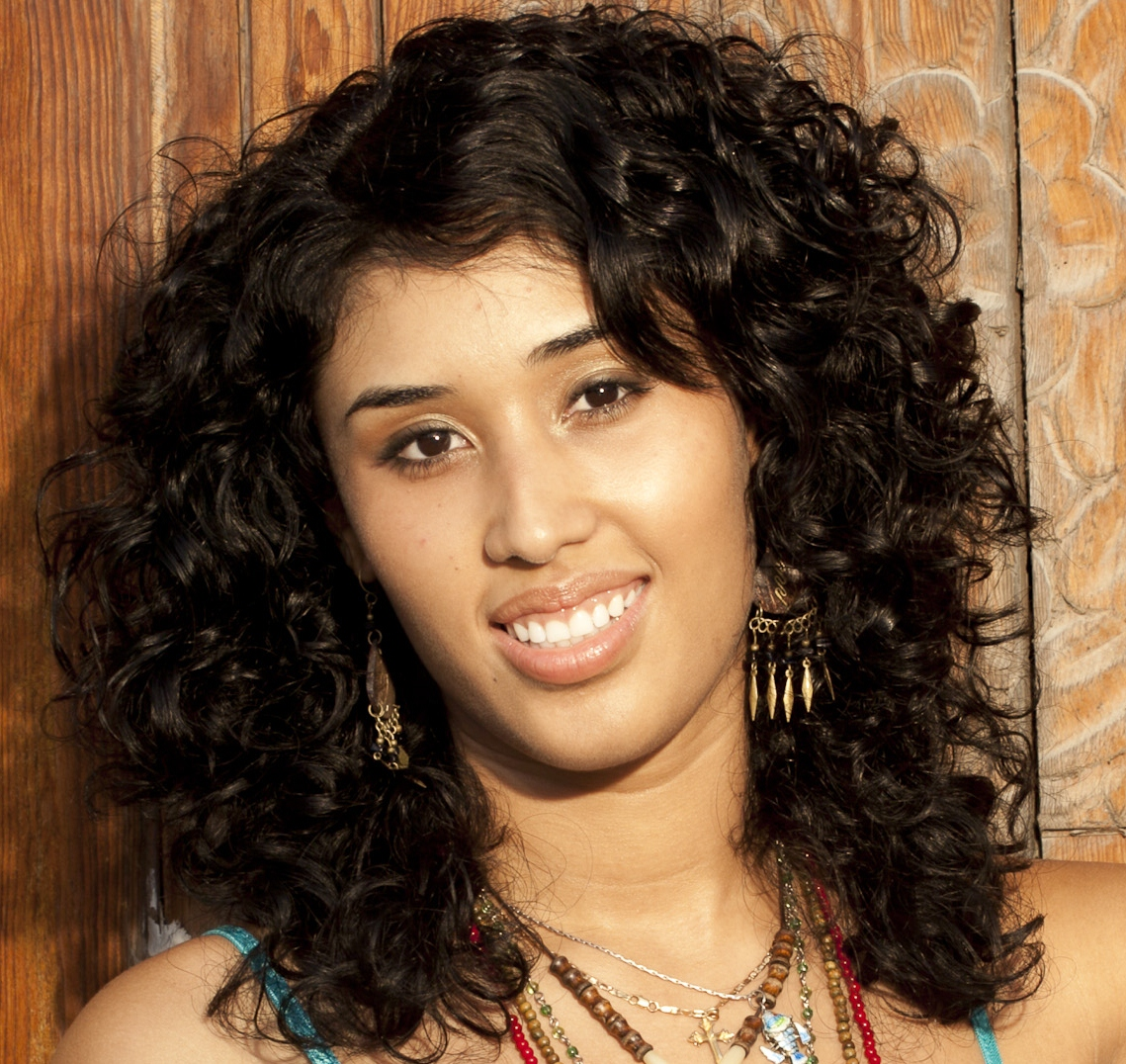
- Rossy Evelin Lima in Weslaco, Texas, 2012.
- Born: Rossy Evelin Lima-Padilla; August 18, 1986 (age 40); Veracruz, Mexico
- Education: PhD University of Houston; BA & MA University of Texas-Pan American
- Occupations: Poet and linguist
- Writing career
- Notable awards: Poet of the Year: The Americas Poetry Festival, New York, 2018 Premio Internazionale di Poesia La Finestra Eterea, 2017 Premio Orgullo Fronterizo Mexicano, 2016
- Website: www.rossylima.com

Rossy Evelin Lima-Padilla (born August 18, 1986) is a United States–based Mexican writer, scholar, translator and activist. She has published her work in numerous journals, magazines and anthologies in Europe, North America and South America.

== Biography ==
Lima was born in Veracruz, Mexico, to Mexican parents on August 18, 1986. At the age of thirteen her family immigrated into the United States at a river crossing. Her family settled in Texas where she struggled with the new education system. Lima has stated, "School was a new system for me, and it made me feel lonely and scared. I struggled to learn a new language to communicate, but my brain and my lips seemed disconnected, I murmured trembling words that my classmates and teachers could not understand."

During her struggling teenage years, Lima excelled in school and found her passion for literature and poetry. She graduated from PSJA Memorial High School in 2005.

In 2009, Lima graduated with a bachelor's in literature from the University of Texas-Pan American and earned her masters's in literature the next year from the same university. Lima went on to earn a PhD in linguistics from the University of Texas Rio Grande Valley.

In 2012, she entered into the DACA (Deferred Action for Childhood Arrivals) program.

In 2016, Lima co-founded Jade Publishing; a publishing company dedicated to the publication and promotion of emerging Latin American literary talent in both English and Spanish.

Lima is currently the director of the Spanish Heritage Language Program at Texas Tech University.

== Writing ==
Lima was recognized by the 2014 International Latino Book Awards for her work on Ecos de barro (2013). The Monitor wrote that her poems in Ecos de barro were "vibrant" and that "Lima demonstrates with effortless art, words have the power to transform us for good or ill."

Texas Review writes that Lima's personal journey as an immigrant and her own "roots" are central themes in the poetry of Aguacamino/Waterpath (2015). They write, "Lima's enlistment of her multifaceted identity allows her to actualize her immigrant and writing experiences, forming a visceral and critically needed prism."

In 2015, she was recognized in Venice for her poem, Citlalicue with an International poetry award (Premio Internazionale di Poesia Altino). She was awarded the Orgullo Fronterizo Mexicano award given by the Institute for Mexicans Abroad in 2016.

In 2017, she was awarded first place in the Concorso Internazionale di Poesia La Finestra Eterea in Milan in 2017.

Poet Laureate of the United States, Juan Felipe Herrera, wrote that Migrare, mutare (2017) is "A magnificent set of poems, in a most appropriate time."

== Selected bibliography ==
- Migrare, mutare/Migrate, Mutate. New York: Artepoética Press. 2017. ISBN 9781940075501.
- Aguacamino/Waterpath. Huntsville, Texas: Mouthfeel Press. 2015. ISBN 9780991208791.
- Ecos de barro. Brownsville, Texas: Otras Voces Publishing. 2013. ISBN 9780985737719.
