= Alamo, Texas =

- City
- Interactive map of Alamo, Texas
- Location within Texas Location within the United States Location within North America
- Coordinates: 26°11′6″N 98°7′4″W
- Country: United States of America
- State: Texas
- County: Hidalgo
- Incorporated: May 12, 1924
- Named for: Alamo Mission

Area
  - Total: 7.51 sq mi (19.45 km^{2})
  - Land: 7.51 sq mi (19.45 km^{2})
  - Water: 0 sq mi (0.00 km^{2})
- Elevation: 98 ft (30 m)

Population (2020)
  - Total: 19,493
  - Density: 2,596/sq mi (1,002/km^{2})
- Time zone: UTC-6 (Central (CST))
  - Summer (DST): UTC-5 (CDT)
- ZIP code: 78516
- Area code: 956
- FIPS code: 48-01576
- GNIS feature ID: 1329296
- Website: www.alamotexas.org

Alamo (/ˈæləmoʊ/ AL-ə-moh), located in the Rio Grande Valley is a city in the irrigated area of southern Hidalgo County, Texas, United States in an area of vegetable farming and citrus groves, and is a noted winter resort/retirement town near the Mexico–U.S. border. Alamo is one of the Rio Grande Valley's gateways to Mexico, via U.S. Route 281 and Nuevo Progreso, Tamaulipas, as well as a gateway to the Santa Ana National Wildlife Refuge. Alamo's population was 19,493 at the 2020 census.

== History ==
Alamo was laid out in 1909, and named after the Alamo Mission in San Antonio.

== Geography ==
Alamo is located in southern Hidalgo County at 26°11′6″N 98°7′4″W (26.185113, –98.117892). It is bordered to the west by the city of San Juan and to the east by the city of Donna.

According to the United States Census Bureau, Alamo has a total area of 7.1 square miles (18.4 km^{2}), all land.

== Demographics ==
Historical population
Census	Pop.	Note	%±
1930	1,018		—
1940	1,944		91.0%
1950	3,017		55.2%
1960	4,121		36.6%
1970	4,291		4.1%
1980	5,831		35.9%
1990	8,210		40.8%
2000	14,760		79.8%
2010	18,353		24.3%
2020	19,493		6.2%
U.S. Decennial Census

Alamo is part of the McAllen–Edinburg–Mission and Reynosa–McAllen metropolitan areas.

=== 2020 census ===
Alamo racial composition (NH = Non-Hispanic) (Note: Note: the US Census treats Hispanic/Latino as an ethnic category. This table excludes Latinos from the racial categories and assigns them to a separate category. Hispanics/Latinos can be of any race.)
Race	Number	Percentage
White (NH)	2,302	11.81%
Black or African American (NH)	28	0.14%
Native American or Alaska Native (NH)	14	0.07%
Asian (NH)	27	0.14%
Pacific Islander (NH)	2	0.01%
Some Other Race (NH)	48	0.25%
Mixed/Multi-Racial (NH)	67	0.34%
Hispanic or Latino	17,005	87.24%
Total	19,493	

As of the 2020 census, there were 19,493 people, 6,238 households, and 4,758 families residing in the city. The median age was 34.8 years; 28.8% of residents were under the age of 18 and 18.8% of residents were 65 years of age or older. For every 100 females there were 94.3 males, and for every 100 females age 18 and over there were 89.6 males age 18 and over.

99.8% of residents lived in urban areas, while 0.2% lived in rural areas.

There were 6,238 households in Alamo, of which 41.9% had children under the age of 18 living in them. Of all households, 51.8% were married-couple households, 14.3% were households with a male householder and no spouse or partner present, and 28.4% were households with a female householder and no spouse or partner present. About 18.5% of all households were made up of individuals and 10.9% had someone living alone who was 65 years of age or older.

There were 8,373 housing units, of which 25.5% were vacant. Among occupied housing units, 73.1% were owner-occupied and 26.9% were renter-occupied. The homeowner vacancy rate was 2.0% and the rental vacancy rate was 18.0%.

Racial composition as of the 2020 census
Race	Percent
White	38.2%
Black or African American	0.2%
American Indian and Alaska Native	0.7%
Asian	0.1%
Native Hawaiian and Other Pacific Islander	<0.1%
Some other race	20.2%
Two or more races	40.5%
Hispanic or Latino (of any race)	87.2%

=== 2000 census ===
As of the census of 2000, 14,760 people, 4,621 households, and 3,826 families resided in the city. The population density was 2,580.8 inhabitants per square mile (996.5/km^{2}). The 6,208 housing units averaged 1,085.5 per square mile (419.0/km^{2}). The racial makeup of the city was 83.61% White (including Hispanics or Latinos), 0.21% African American, 0.43% Native American, 0.09% Asian, 13.73% from other races, and 1.94% from two or more races. Hispanics or Latinos people of any race were 78.10% of the population.

Of the 4,621 households, 36.5% had children under the age of 18 living with them, 66.2% were married couples living together, 13.3% had a female householder with no husband present, and 17.2% were not families. About 15.1% of all households were made up of individuals, and 10.2% had someone living alone who was 65 years of age or older. The average household size was 3.19 and the average family size was 3.57.

In the city, the population was distributed as 30.0% under the age of 18, 9.8% from 18 to 24, 22.9% from 25 to 44, 17.5% from 45 to 64, and 19.8% who were 65 years of age or older. The median age was 33 years. For every 100 females, there were 93.4 males. For every 100 females age 18 and over, there were 88.7 males.

The median income for a household in the city was $23,928, and for a family was $24,827. Males had a median income of $17,476 versus $14,683 for females. The per capita income for the city was $10,564. About 24.9% of families and 32.4% of the population were below the poverty line, including 48.0% of those under age 18 and 12.9% of those age 65 or over.

== Education ==
=== Primary and secondary schools ===
Most of Alamo's population resides within the Pharr-San Juan-Alamo Independent School District (PSJAISD), although a portion does reside in the Donna Independent School District boundaries.

Elementary schools in the PSJAISD located in Alamo include Zeferino Farias Elementary, Agusto Guerra Elementary, Santos Livas (previously North Alamo) Elementary, Marcia R. Garza Elementary, and John McKeever Elementary. Middle schools: Alamo Middle School and Audie Murphy Middle all serve Alamo. Pharr-San Juan-Alamo Memorial High School is the zoned high school of PSJAISD Alamo.

Captain D. Salinas II Elementary, Sauceda Middle School, and Donna High School serve the Donna ISD portion.

In addition, all Alamo residents are allowed to apply to magnet schools operated by the South Texas Independent School District.

Valley Christian Heritage School is in Alamo.

Idea Public School District enrolls local students in any of a variety of area campuses in located in Alamo, San Juan, Pharr, Donna, and Edinburg.

=== Public libraries ===
Sergeant Fernando de la Rosa Memorial Library is located in Alamo. The library is named after United States Army Sergeant Fernando "Nando" De La Rosa, who died during a roadside bomb explosion on October 27, 2009, in the Arghandab River Valley in Afghanistan.

== Radio stations ==
- KFRQ (94.5 FM)
- KJAV (104.9 FM)
- KVLY (107.9 FM)
