= Valley Christian Heritage School =

Coordinates: 26°12′6.5″N 98°7′9″W

Valley Christian Heritage School (VCHS) is a private Christian K-12 school in Alamo, Texas, in the Rio Grande Valley.

It began operations in 1978, and in 1991 received accreditation from the National Christian Schools Association and the Texas Christian Schools Association.
