= Pharr-San Juan-Alamo Southwest High School =

Public school in Texas, United States

PSJA Southwest Early College High School

Location
- 300 E. Rancho Blanco Road; Pharr, Texas; United States
- Coordinates: 26.1569°N 98.18732°W

Information
- Type: Public
- Established: 2010
- School district: Pharr-San Juan-Alamo Independent School District
- Staff: 140.28 (FTE)
- Grades: 9-12
- Enrollment: 1,709 (2017-18)
- Student to teacher ratio: 12.18
- Colors: Navy, silver, and white
- Mascot: Javelina
- Website: www.psjaisd.us/javelinas

Pharr-San Juan-Alamo (PSJA) Southwest High School is a public school in Pharr, Texas (United States). It is part of the Pharr-San Juan-Alamo Independent School District and is one of the district's six high schools.

== Student demographics ==
As of the 2010–2011 school year, Southwest High School had a total of 351 students. 89.5% of the students are considered economically disadvantaged.

== Attendance area and feeder patterns ==
The school's attendance boundary includes much of southern Pharr, including the Las Milpas area.

Feeder elementary schools include C. Anaya, Cesar Chavez, Escobar, Garcia, Kelly-Pharr, Palmer, and B. Palacios. The two feeder middle schools are Edward M. Kennedy and Jaime Escalante.
