= Thomas Jefferson T-STEM Early College High School =

Location
- 714 East Business Highway 83; Pharr, Texas; United States
- Coordinates: 26.192699°N 98.175491°W

Information
- Type: Public
- School district: Pharr-San Juan-Alamo Independent School District
- Principal: Mrs. Bazan
- Staff: 42.13 (FTE)
- Grades: 9-12
- Enrollment: 805 (2017-18)
- Student to teacher ratio: 19.11
- Colors: Royal Blue & Gold
- Mascot: Titan
- Website: www.psjaisd.us/tstem

Thomas Jefferson T-STEM is a 4-year public early college high school located in Pharr, Texas. It is one of the six high schools located in the Pharr-San Juan-Alamo Independent School District. The school focuses on preparing students for university academics and a career in the STEM fields. Partnered with South Texas College, enrolled students have the opportunity to earn college credit towards an associate degree in various subjects.

== Dual enrollment ==
All students are eligible to graduate under the Distinguished Achievement Program (DAP) and participate in the dual enrollment program. Instruction for high school and college courses will be provided in a variety of settings including at various South Texas College campuses. During their four years of high school, students will obtain college credit. By their sophomore year, all students will be enrolled in college classes at STC. Transportation to and from the college is provided by the school district and STC waives tuition for all PSJA ISD Dual Enrollment courses. Enrolled students will be able to have access to the STC facilities such the library and research centers, science laboratories, computer labs and classrooms.

== Goals ==
The main goal and objective of T-STEM is to provide an instructional atmosphere that promotes college readiness through an academic design that articulates clear degree plans and pathways in the STEM fields. These degree plans will include the 42 credit hour academic core curriculum plus 18 credit hours in the specific fields of study.

== Degree plans offered ==
Students will be able to dual-enroll in one of the following degree plans (not all programs are listed):

- Biology
- Chemistry
- Engineering
- Mathematics
- Computer Science
- Interdisciplinary Studies
- Criminal justice
