= North Alamo, Texas =

Census-designated place in Texas, United States

- Census-designated place
- Coordinates: 26°12′53″N 98°7′27″W
- Country: United States of America
- State: Texas
- County: Hidalgo

Area
  - Total: 1.8 sq mi (4.6 km^{2})
  - Land: 1.8 sq mi (4.6 km^{2})
  - Water: 0 sq mi (0.0 km^{2})
- Elevation: 98 ft (30 m)

Population (2020)
  - Total: 3,722
  - Density: 2,100/sq mi (810/km^{2})
- Time zone: UTC-6 (Central (CST))
  - Summer (DST): UTC-5 (CDT)
- FIPS code: 48-51900
- GNIS feature ID: 1852743

North Alamo is a census-designated place (CDP) in Hidalgo County, Texas, United States. The population was 3,722 at the 2020 United States Census. It is part of the McAllen–Edinburg–Mission Metropolitan Statistical Area.

== Geography ==
North Alamo is located at 26°12′53″N 98°7′27″W (26.214649, -98.124075).

According to the United States Census Bureau, the CDP has a total area of 1.8 square miles (4.7 km^{2}), all land.

== Demographics ==
Historical population
Census	Pop.	Note	%±
2000	2,061		—
2010	3,235		57.0%
2020	3,722		15.1%
U.S. Decennial Census; 1850–1900 1910; 1920 1930 1940; 1950 1960 1970; 1980 1990 2000; 2010 2020

North Alamo first appeared as a census designated place in the 2000 U.S. census.

=== Racial and ethnic composition ===
North Alamo CDP, Texas – Racial and ethnic composition Note: the US Census treats Hispanic/Latino as an ethnic category. This table excludes Latinos from the racial categories and assigns them to a separate category. Hispanics/Latinos may be of any race.
Race / Ethnicity (NH = Non-Hispanic)	Pop 2000	Pop 2010	Pop 2020	% 2000	% 2010	% 2020
White alone (NH)	198	222	211	9.61%	6.86%	5.67%
Black or African American alone (NH)	0	2	4	0.00%	0.06%	0.11%
Native American or Alaska Native alone (NH)	0	0	3	0.00%	0.00%	0.08%
Asian alone (NH)	0	1	2	0.00%	0.03%	0.05%
Native Hawaiian or Pacific Islander alone (NH)	0	0	1	0.00%	0.00%	0.03%
Other race alone (NH)	0	0	13	0.00%	0.00%	0.35%
Mixed race or Multiracial (NH)	10	0	4	0.49%	0.00%	0.11%
Hispanic or Latino (any race)	1,853	3,010	3,484	89.91%	93.04%	93.61%
Total	2,061	3,235	3,722	100.00%	100.00%	100.00%

=== 2020 census ===
As of the 2020 census, North Alamo had a population of 3,722. The median age was 29.8 years. 29.8% of residents were under the age of 18 and 11.7% were 65 years of age or older. For every 100 females, there were 93.8 males, and for every 100 females age 18 and over, there were 93.6 males.

100.0% of residents lived in urban areas, while 0.0% lived in rural areas.

There were 999 households, 50.3% of which had children under the age of 18 living in them. Of all households, 55.9% were married-couple households, 13.7% had a male householder and no spouse or partner present, and 25.4% had a female householder and no spouse or partner present. About 14.7% of all households were made up of individuals, and 7.9% had someone living alone who was 65 years of age or older.

There were 1,174 housing units, of which 14.9% were vacant. The homeowner vacancy rate was 0.1% and the rental vacancy rate was 11.1%.

=== 2000 census ===
As of the 2000 census, there were 2,061 people, 565 households, and 496 families residing in the CDP. The population density was 1,148.9 inhabitants per square mile (443.6/km^{2}). There were 913 housing units at an average density of 509.0 per square mile (196.5/km^{2}). The racial makeup of the CDP was 96.70% White, 2.18% from other races, and 1.12% from two or more races. Hispanic or Latino of any race were 89.91% of the population.

There were 565 households, out of which 52.4% had children under the age of 18 living with them, 68.5% were married couples living together, 13.1% had a female householder with no husband present, and 12.2% were non-families. 11.2% of all households were made up of individuals, and 6.0% had someone living alone who was 65 years of age or older. The average household size was 3.65 and the average family size was 3.94.

In the CDP, the population was spread out, with 37.4% under the age of 18, 11.6% from 18 to 24, 27.9% from 25 to 44, 13.8% from 45 to 64, and 9.3% who were 65 years of age or older. The median age was 26 years. For every 100 females, there were 100.9 males. For every 100 females age 18 and over, there were 98.9 males.

The median income for a household in the CDP was $19,430, and the median income for a family was $19,357. Males had a median income of $21,250 versus $19,250 for females. The per capita income for the CDP was $8,857. About 47.1% of families and 53.6% of the population were below the poverty line, including 63.8% of those under age 18 and 34.8% of those age 65 or over.

== Education ==
North Alamo is served by the Pharr-San Juan-Alamo Independent School District.

Elementary schools which serve sections of the community include Sgt. Leonel Trevino (inside the North Alamo CDP), Augusto Guerra, and Santos Livas (North Alamo). Secondary schools serving North Alamo are Audie Murphy Middle School, and Pharr-San Juan-Alamo Memorial High School.

In addition, South Texas Independent School District operates magnet schools that serve the community.
