= Pharr, Texas =

- City
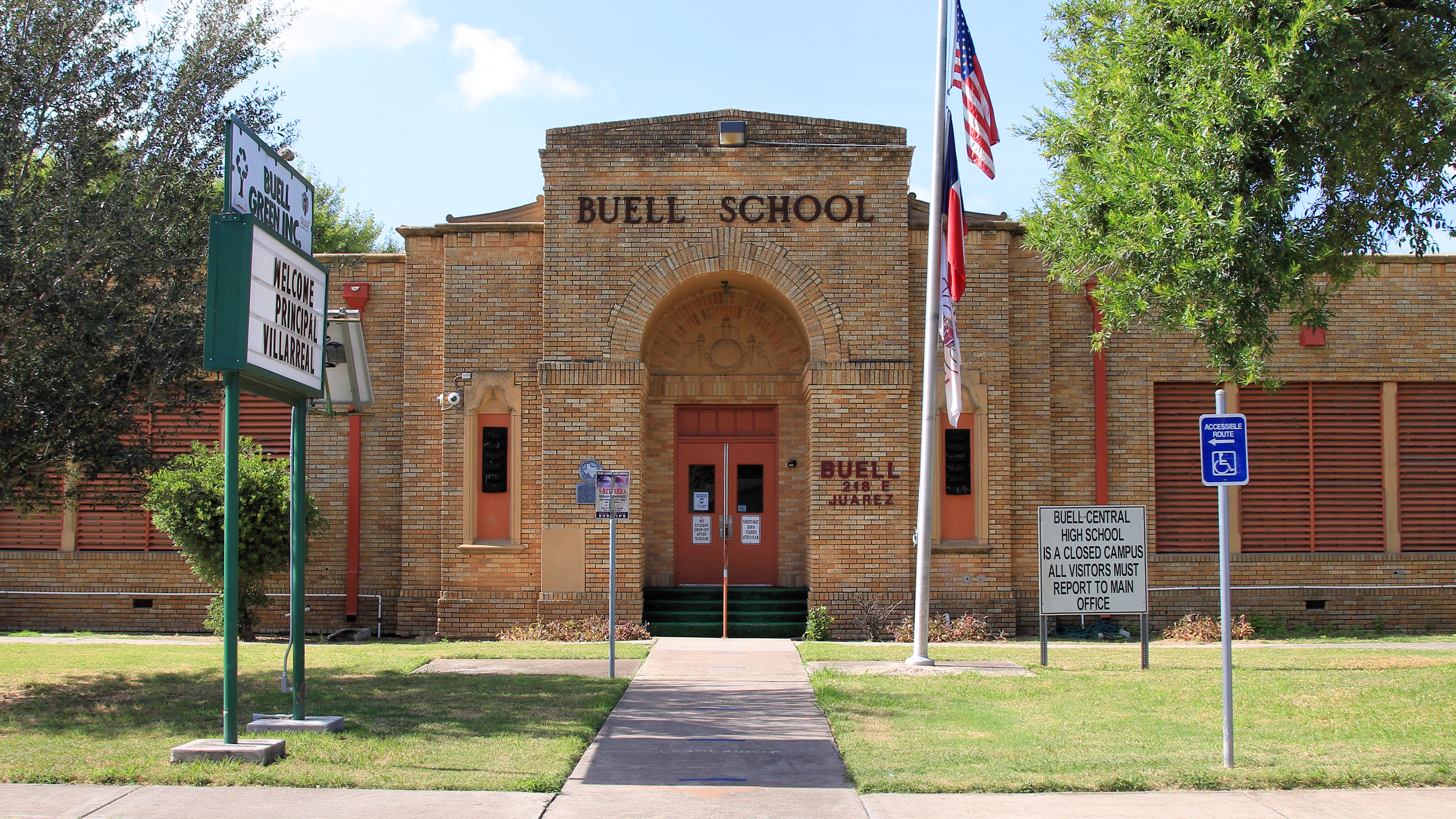
- The Buell School in Pharr, which was designated a Recorded Texas Historic Landmark in 1990.

- Flag

- Location of Pharr, Texas
- Coordinates: 26°12′23″N 98°11′7″W
- Country: United States
- State: Texas
- County: Hidalgo
- Incorporated: February 22, 1916

Government
  - Type: Council-manager
  - City Council: Mayor Dr Ambrosio "Amos" Hernandez. Michael Pacheco; Roberto "Bobby" Carrillo; Ramiro Caballero; Daniel Chavez; Ricardo Medina; Itza Flores
  - City Manager: Jonathan B. Flores

Area
  - Total: 23.65 sq mi (61.26 km^{2})
  - Land: 23.63 sq mi (61.19 km^{2})
  - Water: 0.027 sq mi (0.07 km^{2})
- Elevation: 112 ft (34 m)

Population (2020)
  - Total: 79,715
  - Estimate (2022): 80,187
  - Density: 3,348.5/sq mi (1,292.85/km^{2})
- Time zone: UTC-6 (Central (CST))
  - Summer (DST): UTC-5 (CDT)
- ZIP code: 78577
- Area code: 956
- FIPS code: 48-57200
- GNIS feature ID: 1343930
- Website: www.pharr-tx.gov

Pharr is a city in Hidalgo County, Texas, United States. As of the 2020 census, the city population was 79,715, and in 2022, the estimated population was 80,187. Pharr is connected by bridge to the Mexican city of Reynosa, Tamaulipas. Pharr is part of the McAllen–Edinburg–Mission and Reynosa–McAllen metropolitan areas.

== Geography ==
Pharr is located in southern Hidalgo County at 26°12′23″N 98°11′7″W (26.206334, –98.185174). It is bordered to the west by the city of McAllen, to the north by Edinburg, the county seat, to the east by San Juan, and to the southwest by Hidalgo. The Pharr city limits extend south in a narrow band to the Rio Grande and the Pharr–Reynosa International Bridge into Mexico.

According to the United States Census Bureau, Pharr has a total area of 23.4 square miles (60.7 km^{2}), of which 0.03 square miles (0.07 km^{2}), or 0.12%, is covered by water.

Communities:

- Las Milpas (annexed in 1987)

== History ==
The community was named after sugar planter Henry Newton Pharr (1872-1966). For a number of years, centering around early 1900, Henry N. Pharr was director of the State National Bank of New Iberia, Louisiana, and was a former president of the Louisiana–Rio Grande Sugar Company and the Louisiana–Rio Grande Canal Company, which at one time owned 8,000 acres (32.4 km^{2}) and which, in 1910, built the town of Pharr on this land. Pharr was the Republican nominee for Louisiana governor in 1908, as his father John Newton Pharr had been in 1896.

Pharr has grown rapidly since the late 20th century, from a population of 32,921 in 1990 to an estimated 77,320 in 2016 and 79,112 in 2019.

In 1987, Pharr annexed Las Milpas.

In 2006, Pharr received "The All-America City" award.

== Climate ==
Pharr has a humid subtropical climate, similar to that of the Tampa Bay Area of Florida, but with less precipitation and slightly higher summer maximum temperatures. The average high in January is 68 °F (20 °C), and the average low is 47 °F (8 °C). In August, the average high is 100 °F (38 °C), and the average low is 80 °F (27 °C). The warm season is long, with average highs and lows similar to August's from June through September.

The average annual precipitation is 21.0 inches (530 mm). Most precipitation occurs in the warm season, with the least precipitation distinctly occurring in the cooler winter. As September is the peak of the north Atlantic hurricane season and tropical storms and hurricanes occasionally drop copious amounts of rainfall on the region, this month tends to be by far the wettest, averaging 3.6 inches (91 mm) of precipitation. The driest month is March, with 0.7 inches (18 mm) of precipitation.

Despite frequent temperatures above 100 °F (38 °C), occasionally as early as February and as late as the end of October, the highest temperature ever recorded in Pharr is 110 °F (43 °C), once in 1998 and once in 1999. The lowest temperature ever recorded in Pharr is 13 °F (−11 °C), on January 12, 1962, which is far lower than would be expected at the same latitude in Florida or on the west coast of North America, due to Pharr's location closer to the middle of the continent.

== Demographics ==
Historical population
| Census | Pop. | Note | %± |
|---|---|---|---|
| 1920 | 1,565 | | — |
| 1930 | 3,225 | | 106.1% |
| 1940 | 4,784 | | 48.3% |
| 1950 | 8,690 | | 81.6% |
| 1960 | 14,106 | | 62.3% |
| 1970 | 15,829 | | 12.2% |
| 1980 | 21,381 | | 35.1% |
| 1990 | 32,921 | | 54.0% |
| 2000 | 46,660 | | 41.7% |
| 2010 | 70,400 | | 50.9% |
| 2020 | 79,715 | | 13.2% |
U.S. Decennial Census

=== 2020 census ===
As of the 2020 census, Pharr had a population of 79,715 and 18,420 families residing in the city.

The median age was 30.3 years; 31.0% of residents were under the age of 18, and 12.0% of residents were 65 years of age or older. For every 100 females there were 91.5 males, and for every 100 females age 18 and over there were 87.1 males age 18 and over.

99.9% of residents lived in urban areas, while 0.1% lived in rural areas.

There were 23,613 households in Pharr, of which 48.3% had children under the age of 18 living in them, 49.0% were married-couple households, 15.3% were households with a male householder and no spouse or partner present, and 30.6% were households with a female householder and no spouse or partner present; about 16.3% of all households were made up of individuals and 7.5% had someone living alone who was 65 years of age or older.

There were 27,029 housing units, of which 12.6% were vacant; the homeowner vacancy rate was 1.3% and the rental vacancy rate was 9.2%.

Pharr racial composition (NH = Non-Hispanic) (Note: Note: the US Census treats Hispanic/Latino as an ethnic category. This table excludes Latinos from the racial categories and assigns them to a separate category. Hispanics/Latinos can be of any race.)
| Race | Number | Percentage |
|---|---|---|
| White (NH) | 3,733 | 4.68% |
| Black or African American (NH) | 134 | 0.17% |
| Native American or Alaska Native (NH) | 23 | 0.03% |
| Asian (NH) | 293 | 0.37% |
| Pacific Islander (NH) | 3 | 0.0% |
| Some Other Race (NH) | 172 | 0.22% |
| Mixed/Multi-Racial (NH) | 158 | 0.2% |
| Hispanic or Latino | 75,199 | 94.33% |
| Total | 79,715 | |

=== 2000 census ===
As of the census of 2000, 46,660 people, 12,798 households, and 10,878 families were residing in the city. The population density was 2,240.2 people/sq mi (864.9/km^{2}). The 16,537 housing units averaged 794.0/sq mi (306.5/km^{2}). The racial makeup of the city was 79.46% White, 0.24% African American, 0.72% Native American, 0.23% Asian, 17.32% from other races, and 2.04% from two or more races. About 90.62% of the population was Hispanic or Latino of any race.

Of the 12,798 households, 47.1% had children under 18 living with them, 64.2% were married couples living together, 16.9% had a female householder with no husband present, and 15.0% were not families. About 13.3% of all households were made up of individuals, and 7.6% had someone living alone who was 65 or older. The average household size was 3.64 and the average family size was 4.02.

In the city, the age distribution was 34.8% under 18, 11.3% from 18 to 24, 26.3% from 25 to 44, 15.8% from 45 to 64, and 11.9% who were 65 or older. The median age was 27 years. For every 100 females, there were 90.9 males. For every 100 females age 18 and over, there were 85.7 males.

The median income for a household in the city was $24,333, and for a family was $25,916. Males had a median income of $19,169 versus $16,737 for females. The per capita income for the city was $9,462. 35.5% of the population and 30.8% of families were below the poverty line. Of the total population, 46.6% of those under 18 and 23.1% of those 65 and older were living below the poverty line.

== Government and infrastructure ==
Pharr City Hall is located at 118 S Cage Blvd, Pharr, Texas 78577. The Innovation and Technology Department operates its official website (http://pharr-tx.gov), as well as its local government television on Time Warner Cable channel 17.12. All current social media platforms are used to allow for interactive governmental operations.

The Pharr–Reynosa International Bridge is operated by the city of Pharr.

The Texas Department of Transportation operates the Pharr District Office in Pharr.

The United States Postal Service operates the Pharr Post Office in Pharr.

== Transportation ==
=== Highways ===
- Pharr has I-2/U.S. 83 as its major east–west artery. U.S. 281 runs north–south through the city and intersects I-2/U.S. 83 at the center of the city and continues south to the Pharr-Reynosa International Bridge. From I-2/U.S. 83 at the center of the city north to Edinburg (and eventually to George West), U.S. 281 is co-signed with I-69C.

== Education ==
=== Primary and secondary schools ===
The majority of Pharr is served by the Pharr-San Juan-Alamo Independent School District, which has five high schools in the city: PSJA North Early College High School, PSJA Southwest Early College High School, Thomas Jefferson TSTEM Early College High School, PSJA Sonia M. Sotomayor Early College High School, and Buell Central DAEP. Zoned PSJA ISD schools include PSJA North and PSJA Southwest.

A small fringe portion of the city is a part of the Hidalgo Independent School District. Another small portion is a part of the Valley View Independent School District, which has one campus with around 2,000 students.

In addition, residents are allowed to apply to magnet schools operated by the South Texas Independent School District.

=== Area colleges and universities ===
- University of Texas Rio Grande Valley in Edinburg
- South Texas College in McAllen

=== Public libraries ===
Pharr Memorial Library serves the city.

== Sister cities ==
- San Luis Potosí, San Luis Potosí, Mexico
- Zacualpan de Amilpas, Tetela del Volcan, and Ocuituco, Morelos, Mexico.

== Notable people ==
- Leo Araguz — former NFL punter and kicker
- Pedro Borbón — relief pitcher for Major League Baseball
- Cali Carranza — Tejano musician
- Carlos Diego Ferreira — Brazilian mixed martial arts and former Legacy FC
- Omar Ontiveros — professional soccer player
- Baldemar Velasquez — labor-union activist
