= San Juan, Texas =

- City
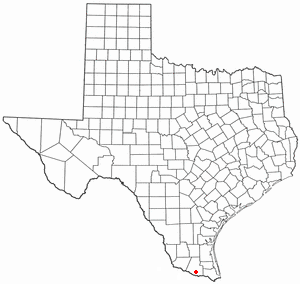
- Location of San Juan, Texas

- Coordinates: 26°11′33″N 98°9′10″W
- Country: United States of America
- State: Texas
- County: Hidalgo

Government
  - Type: Council-manager
  - City Council: Mayor Mario "Mara" Garza; Leonardo "Lenny" Sanchez; Adina "Dina" Santillan; Ernesto "Neto" Guajardo; Marco "Markie" Villegas
  - City Manager: Benjamin "Ben" Arjona

Area
  - Total: 11.64 sq mi (30.16 km^{2})
  - Land: 11.64 sq mi (30.16 km^{2})
  - Water: 0 sq mi (0.00 km^{2})
- Elevation: 105 ft (32 m)

Population (2020)
  - Total: 35,294
  - Density: 3,030.9/sq mi (1,170.23/km^{2})
- Time zone: UTC-6 (Central (CST))
  - Summer (DST): UTC-5 (CDT)
- ZIP code: 78589
- Area code: 956
- FIPS code: 48-65516
- GNIS feature ID: 1346393
- Website: www.sjtx.us

San Juan is a city in Hidalgo County, Texas, United States. As of the 2020 census, its population was 35,294, an increase over the 33,856 tabulated in 2010. It is part of the McAllen–Edinburg–Mission and Reynosa–McAllen metropolitan areas.

The city is known for the Basilica of the National Shrine of Our Lady of San Juan del Valle, one of the largest churches in South Texas.

== History ==
The community was organized in 1909, in part, due to the efforts of John Closner.

== Geography ==
San Juan is located in the Rio Grande Valley region. It is bordered to the west by the city of Pharr and to the east by the city of Alamo. Unincorporated communities bordering San Juan include Lopezville to the northwest, Murillo to the north, and North Alamo to the northeast. San Juan is 5 miles (8 km) east of McAllen and 8 miles (13 km) south of Edinburg, the county seat. It is 10 miles (16 km) north of the Mexican border at the Pharr–Reynosa International Bridge over the Rio Grande.

According to the United States Census Bureau, San Juan has a total area of 11.5 square miles (29.7 km^{2}), all land.

The center of San Juan is south of Interstate 2/U.S. Route 83 and east of U.S. Route 281.

== Demographics ==
Historical population
Census	Pop.	Note	%±
1920	1,203		—
1930	1,615		34.2%
1940	2,264		40.2%
1950	3,413		50.8%
1960	4,371		28.1%
1970	5,070		16.0%
1980	7,608		50.1%
1990	10,815		42.2%
2000	26,229		142.5%
2010	33,856		29.1%
2020	35,294		4.2%
U.S. Decennial Census

=== 2020 census ===
Racial composition as of the 2020 census
Race	Number	Percent
White	10,609	30.1%
Black or African American	111	0.3%
American Indian and Alaska Native	215	0.6%
Asian	75	0.2%
Native Hawaiian and other Pacific Islander	8	0.0%
Some other race	8,403	23.8%
Two or more races	15,873	45.0%
Hispanic or Latino (of any race)	34,007	96.4%

As of the 2020 census, San Juan had a population of 35,294 people in 10,070 households and 8,566 families, with a median age of 32.1 years.

About 29.7% of residents were under 18 and 11.7% were 65 or older; for every 100 females, there were 93.2 males, and for every 100 females 18 and over, there were 89.0 males.

About 99.6% of residents lived in urban areas, while 0.4% lived in rural areas.

Of the 10,070 households in San Juan, 49.3% had children under 18 living in them, 55.4% were married-couple households, 12.5% were households with a male householder and no spouse or partner present, and 27.3% were households with a female householder and no spouse or partner present. About 13.5% of all households were made up of individuals, and 6.2% had someone living alone who was 65 or older.

Of the 10,928 housing units, 7.9% were vacant. The homeowner vacancy rate was 1.0% and the rental vacancy rate was 7.8%.

=== 2000 census ===
As of the 2000 census, 26,229 people, 6,606 households, and 5,952 families were residing in the city. The population density was 2,383.0 inhabitants per square mile (920.1/km^{2}). The 7,719 housing units had an average density of 701.3 per square mile (270.8/km^{2}). The racial makeup of the city was 4.4% White, 0.34% African American, 0.8% |Native American, 0.09% Asian, 15.93% from other races, and 1.89% from two or more races. Hispanics or Latinos of any race were 95.12% of the population.

Of the 6,606 households, 56.7% had children under 18 living with them, 69.0% were married couples living together, 17.1% had a female householder with no husband present, and 9.9% were not families. About 8.6% of all households were made up of individuals, and 4.2% had someone living alone who was 65 or older. The average household size was 3.95, and the average family size was 4.19.

In the city, the age distribution was 37.4% under 18, 11.9% from 18 to 24, 27.4% from 25 to 44, 15.6% from 45 to 64, and 7.8% who were 65 or older. The median age was 26 years. For every 100 females, there were 93.5 males. For every 100 females 18 and over, there were 88.4 males.

The median income in the city for a household was $22,706 and for a family was $23,314. Males had a median income of $18,756 versus $16,910 for females. The per capita income for the city was $7,945. About 32.7% of families and 34.4% of the population were below the poverty line, including 40.6% of those under 18 and 24.8% of those 65 or over.

== Government and infrastructure ==
The United States Postal Service operates the San Juan Post Office.

== Education ==
=== Primary and secondary schools ===
Almost all of San Juan is a part of the Pharr-San Juan-Alamo Independent School District (PSJA ISD). A small fringe portion is a part of the Hidalgo Independent School District.

PSJA ISD elementary schools in San Juan include Carman, Clover, Doedyns, Garza-Peña, North San Juan, Reed-Mock, Sorensen, and Leonel Trevino. Austin Middle School, which opened in 1970, and San Juan Middle School are inside the city. Pharr-San Juan-Alamo High School is in San Juan, serving most of it. A small northeastern section is zoned to Pharr-San Juan-Alamo Memorial High School in Alamo.

In addition, South Texas Independent School District operates magnet schools that serve the community.

=== Public libraries ===
San Juan Memorial Library, located at 1010 S. Standard, San Juan, Texas, serves the city.

== Radio stations ==
- KFRQ 94.5 FM
- KKPS 99.5 FM
- KNVO 101.1 FM
- KVLY 107.9 FM

== Gallery ==
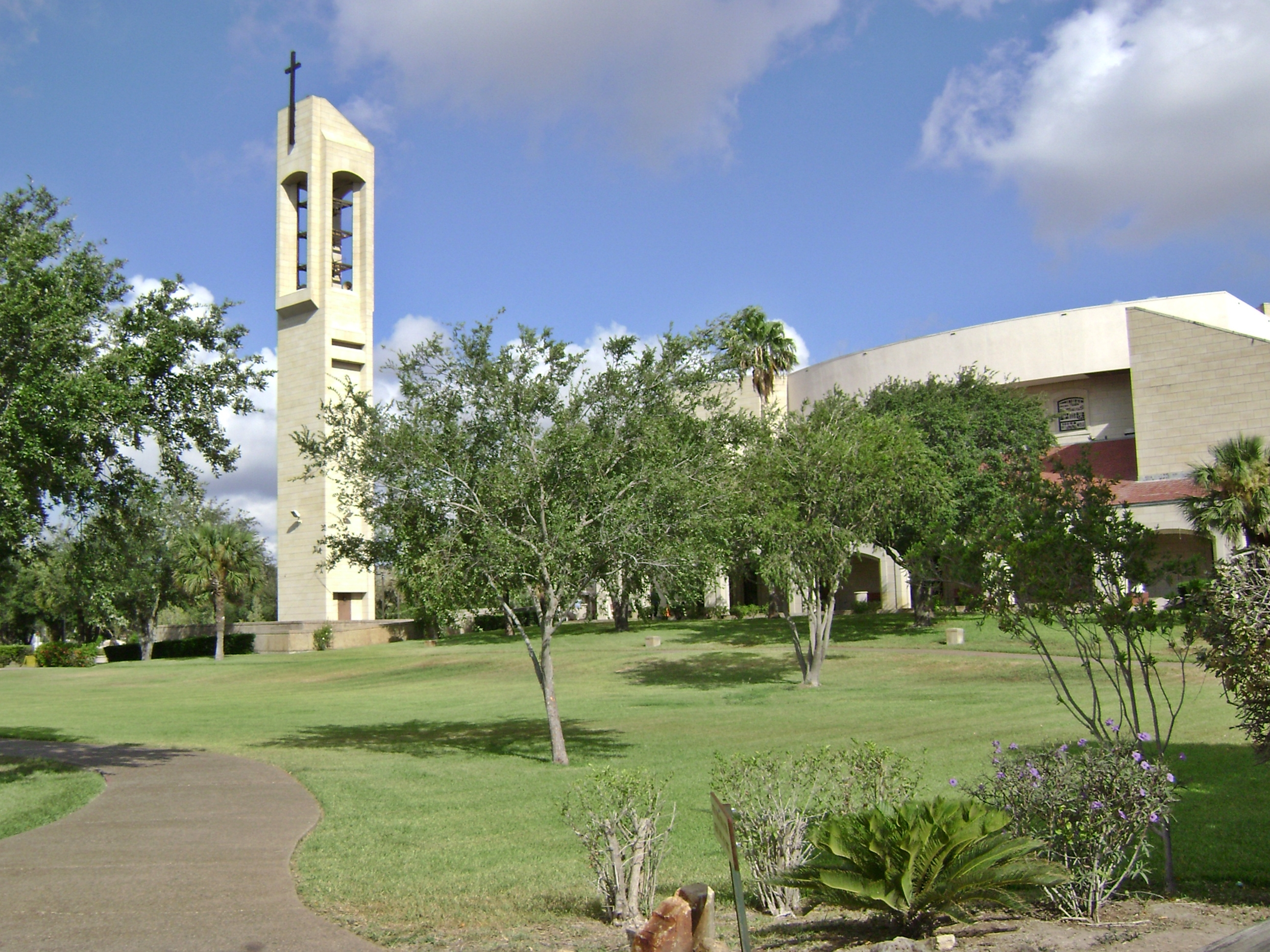
Basilica of the National Shrine of Our Lady of San Juan del Valle

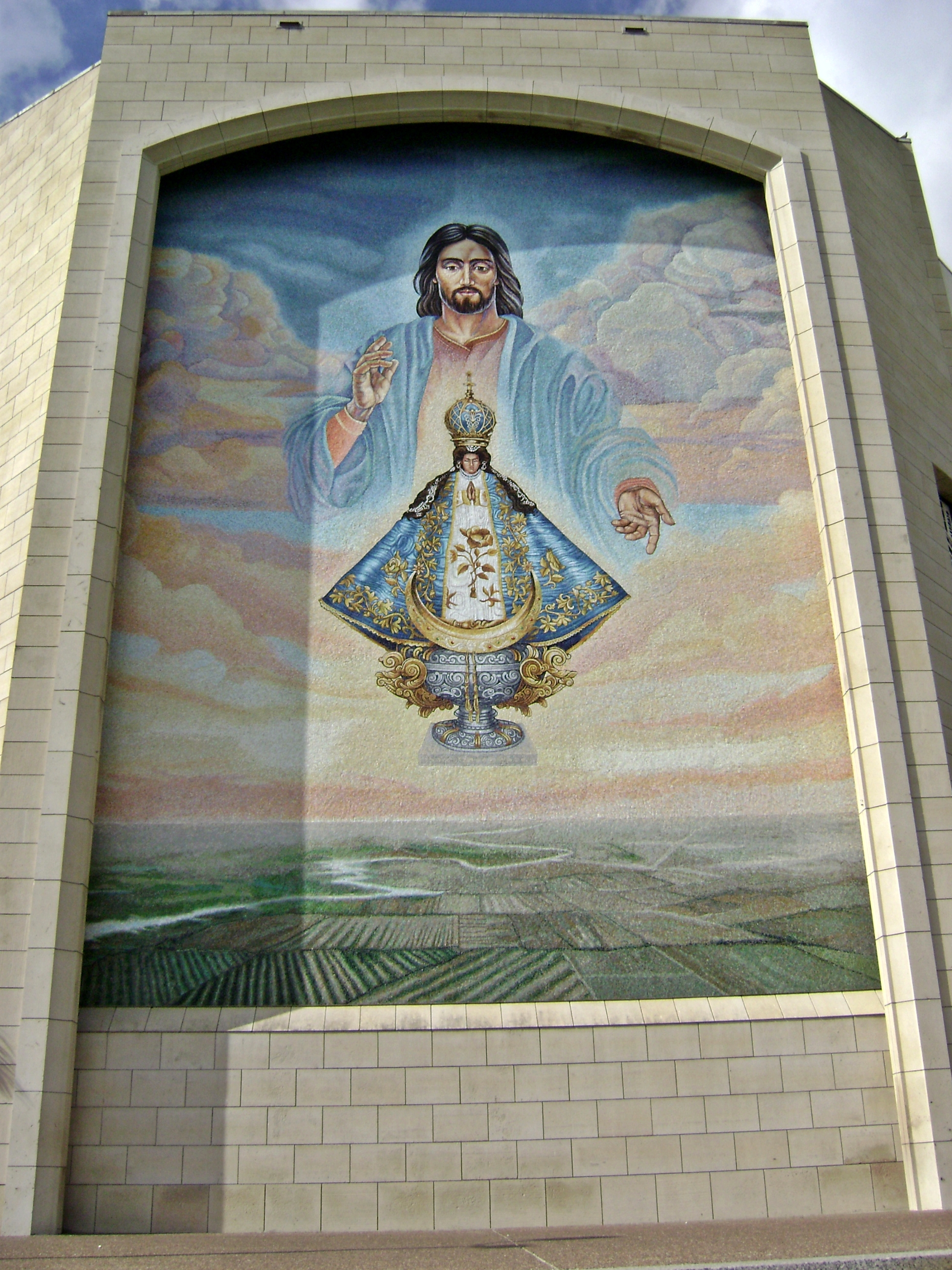
Virgin de San Juan shrine
