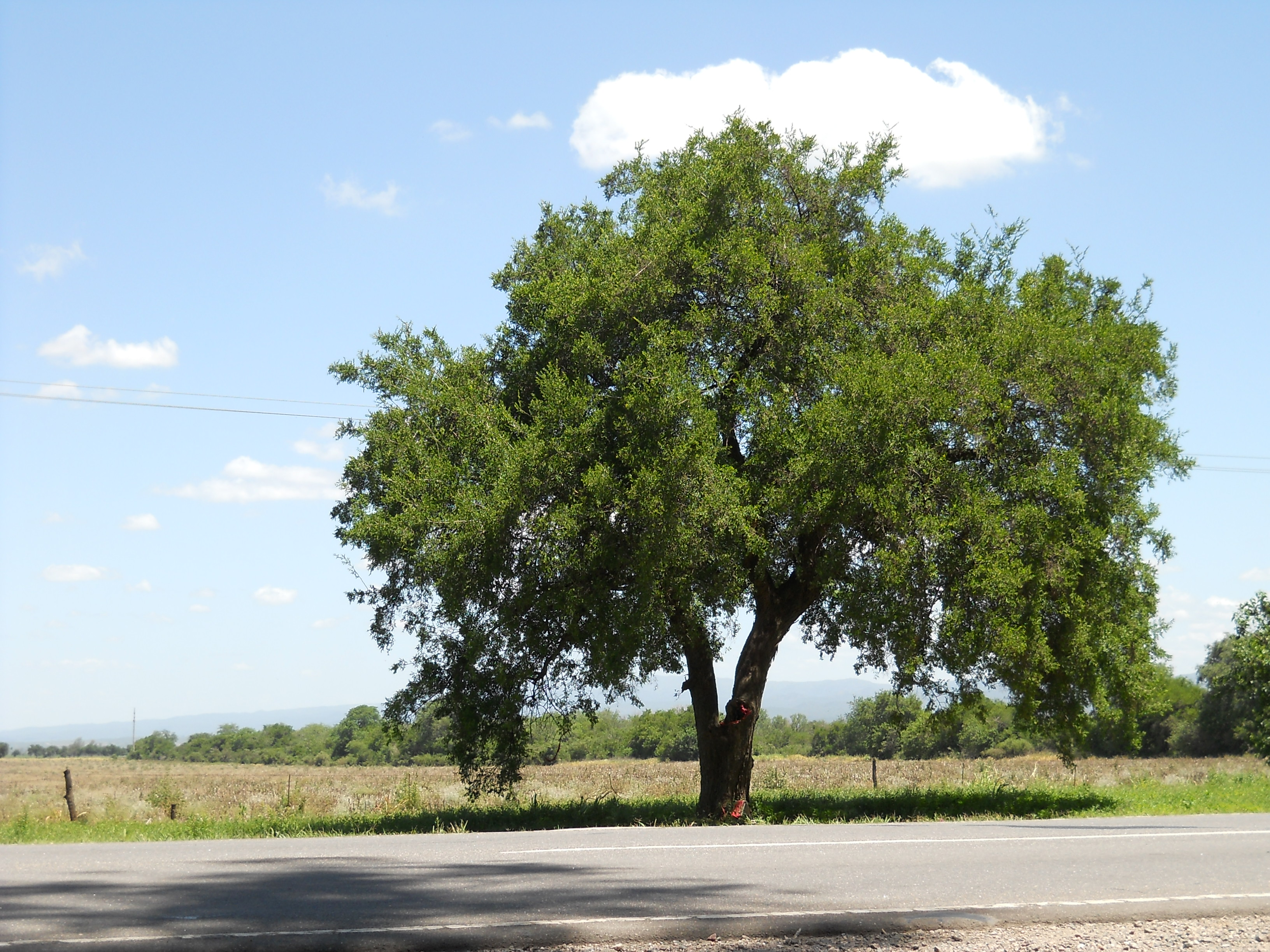

Conservation status
- Least Concern (IUCN 3.1)

Scientific classification
- Kingdom: Plantae
- Clade: Tracheophytes
- Clade: Angiosperms
- Clade: Eudicots
- Clade: Rosids
- Order: Rosales
- Family: Cannabaceae
- Genus: Celtis
- Species: C. ehrenbergiana

Binomial name
- Celtis ehrenbergiana (Klotzsch) Liebm.

Synonyms
- Celtis azcurrensis Parodi; Celtis bonplandiana Planch.; Celtis flexuosa var. glabrifolia Griseb.; Celtis integrifolia Lam.; Celtis lancifolia (Wedd.) Miq.; Celtis punctata (Urb. & Ekman) Urb. & Ekman; Celtis sellowiana Miq.; Celtis spinosa var. pallida (Torr.) M.C. Johnst.; Celtis spinosa var. weddelliana (Planch.) Baehni; Celtis tala Gillies ex Planch.; Celtis tala var. pallida (Torr.) Planch.; Celtis tala f. obtusata Chodat; Celtis tala f. subpilosa Kuntze; Celtis tala f. subtomentosa Kuntze; Celtis tala var. chichape (Wedd.) Planch.; Celtis tala var. gaudichaudiana Planch.; Celtis tala var. gilliesiana Planch.; Celtis tala var. pallida (Torr.) Planch.; Celtis tala var. sellowiana (Miq.) Kuntze; Celtis tala var. weddelliana Planch.; Celtis weddelliana (Planch.) Romanczuk; Momisia ehrenbergiana Klotzsch; Momisia integrifolia Wedd.; Momisia lancifolia Wedd.; Momisia pallida (Torr.) Planch.; Sarcomphalus punctatus Urb. & Ekman

= Celtis ehrenbergiana =

Species of flowering plant

Celtis ehrenbergiana, called the desert hackberry or spiny hackberry, is a plant species that has long been called C. pallida by many authors, including in the "Flora of North America" database. It is native to Arizona, Florida, New Mexico and Texas, and to Latin America as far south as central Argentina. It grows in dry locations such as deserts, brushlands, canyons, mesas and grasslands.

Celtis ehrenbergiana is the only US species of the genus with thorns. In the US, it is a shrub or small tree up to 3 m (10 feet) tall, with thorns on the branches, although it can grow taller in the tropics. Leaves are small for the genus, less than 3 cm (1.2 inches) long and 2 cm (0.8 inches) wide. Flowers are born in cymes of 3–5 flowers. Drupes are orange, yellow or red, juicy, egg-shaped, about 7 mm in diameter, and edible by humans and wildlife.

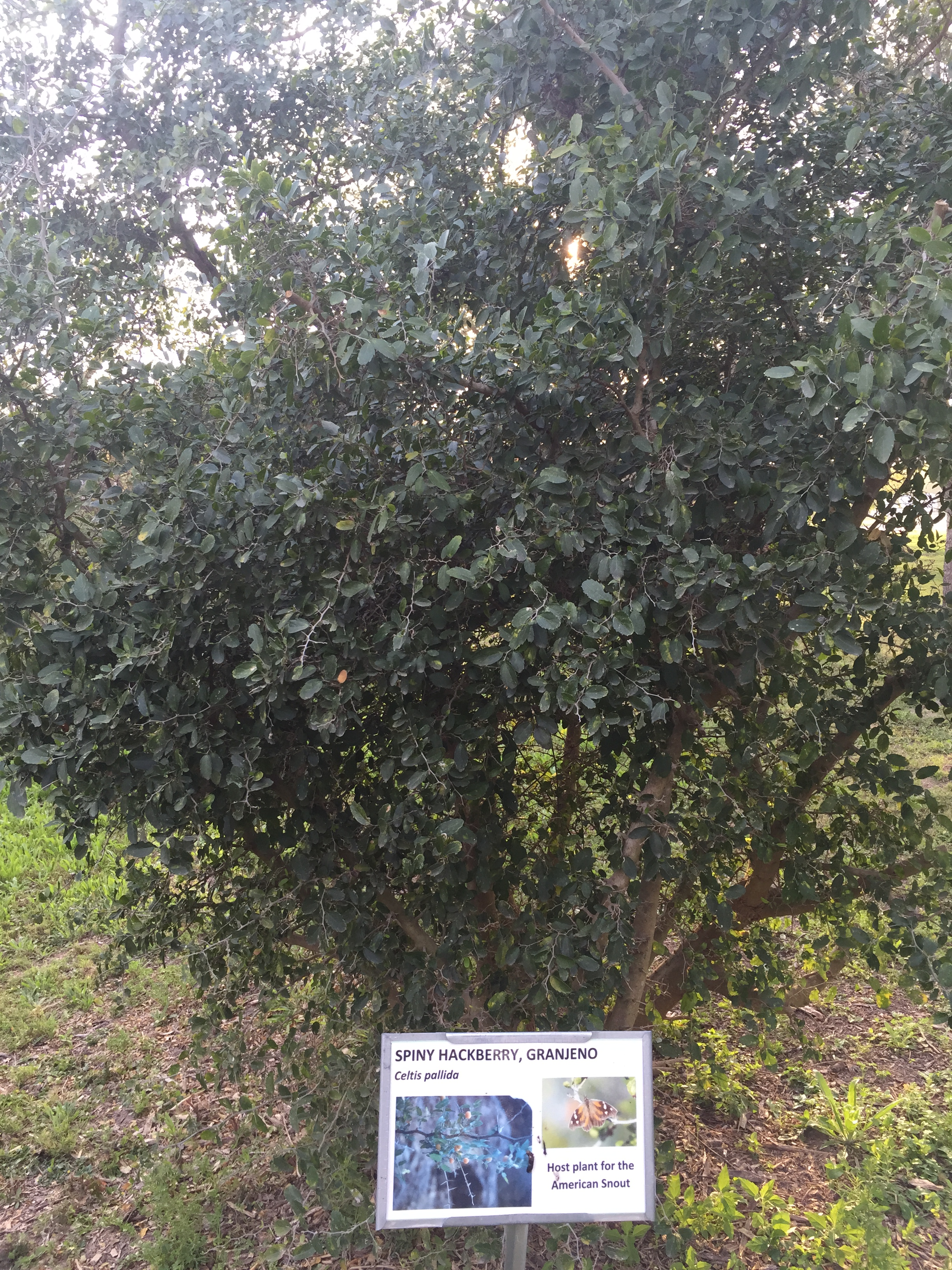
Spiny hackberry or granjeno (Celtis pallida)

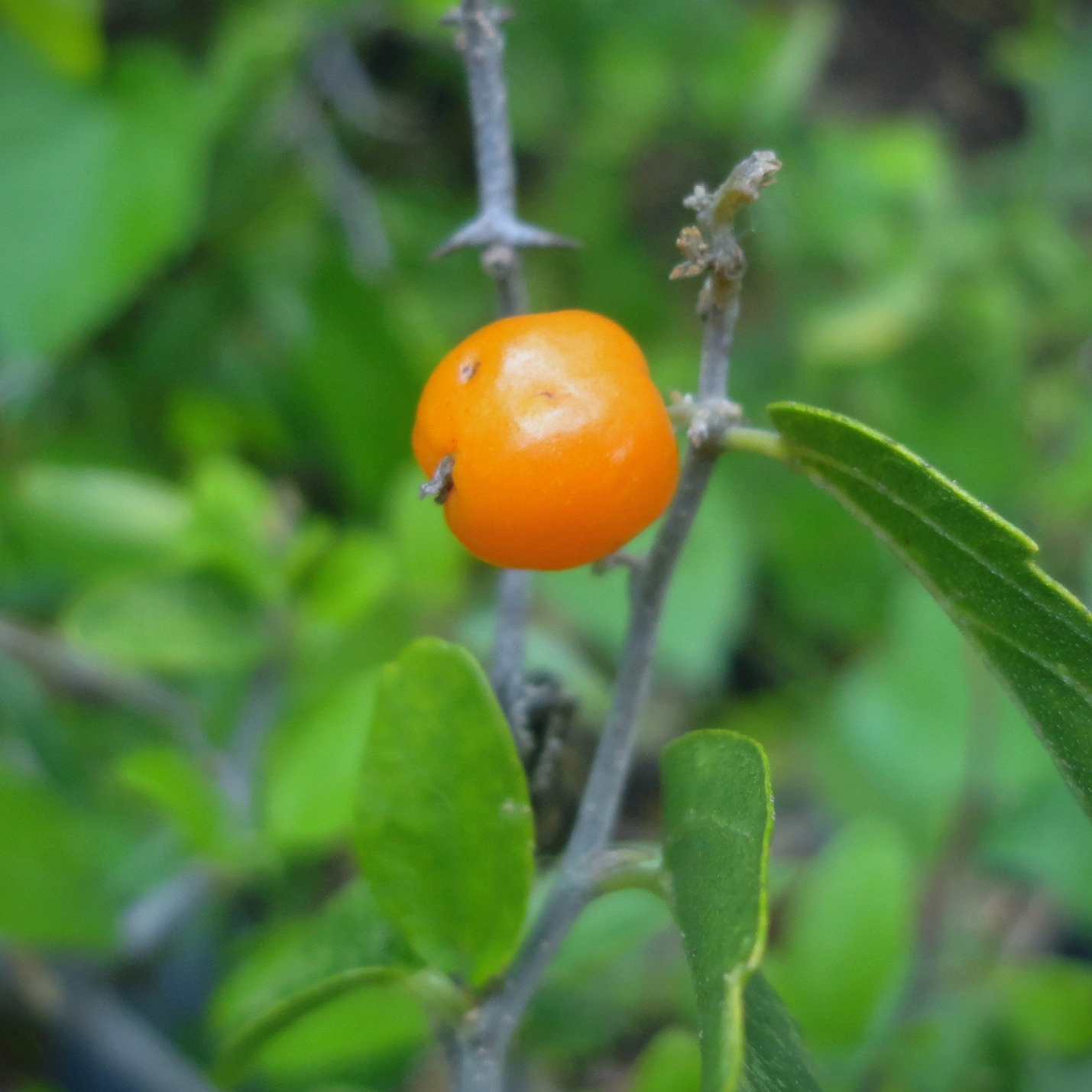
Fruit
