= Lopezville, Texas =

- Census-designated place
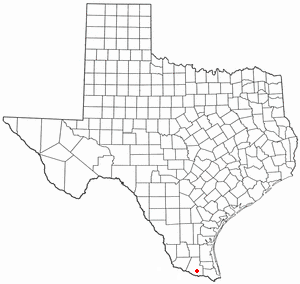
- Location of Lopezville, Texas

- Coordinates: 26°14′45″N 98°9′23″W
- Country: United States of America
- State: Texas
- County: Hidalgo

Area
  - Total: 1.8 sq mi (4.6 km^{2})
  - Land: 1.8 sq mi (4.6 km^{2})
  - Water: 0 sq mi (0.0 km^{2})
- Elevation: 105 ft (32 m)

Population (2020)
  - Total: 2,367
  - Density: 1,300/sq mi (510/km^{2})
- Time zone: UTC-6 (Central (CST))
  - Summer (DST): UTC-5 (CDT)
- ZIP code: 78589
- Area code: 956
- FIPS code: 48-43972
- GNIS feature ID: 1340553

Lopezville is a census-designated place (CDP) in Hidalgo County, Texas, United States. The population was 2,367 at the 2020 United States Census. It is part of the McAllen–Edinburg–Mission Metropolitan Statistical Area. The town developed during the early 1960s as a trailer park. It is named for Francisco Solano López, a former president of Paraguay, a descendant of whom founded his namesake trailer park.

== History ==
The CDP decreased in size between the 2010 U.S. census and the 2020 U.S. census.

== Geography ==
Lopezville is located at 26°14′45″N 98°9′23″W (26.245789, -98.156402).

According to the United States Census Bureau, the CDP has a total area of 1.8 square miles (4.7 km^{2}), all land.

== Demographics ==
Historical population
Census	Pop.	Note	%±
1990	4,471		—
2000	4,476		0.1%
2010	4,333		−3.2%
2020	2,367		−45.4%
U.S. Decennial Census; 1850–1900 1910; 1920 1930 1940; 1950 1960 1970; 1980 1990 2000; 2010 2020

Lopezville first appeared as a census designated place in the 1990 U.S. census.

=== 2020 census ===
Lopezville CDP, Texas – Racial and ethnic composition Note: the US Census treats Hispanic/Latino as an ethnic category. This table excludes Latinos from the racial categories and assigns them to a separate category. Hispanics/Latinos may be of any race.
Race / Ethnicity (NH = Non-Hispanic)	Pop 2000	Pop 2010	Pop 2020	% 2000	% 2010	% 2020
White alone (NH)	75	32	49	1.68%	0.74%	2.07%
Black or African American alone (NH)	3	1	0	0.07%	0.02%	0.00%
Native American or Alaska Native alone (NH)	0	6	1	0.00%	0.14%	0.04%
Asian alone (NH)	0	8	7	0.00%	0.18%	0.30%
Native Hawaiian or Pacific Islander alone (NH)	0	1	0	0.00%	0.02%	0.00%
Other race alone (NH)	2	0	14	0.04%	0.00%	0.59%
Mixed race or Multiracial (NH)	1	9	6	0.02%	0.21%	0.25%
Hispanic or Latino (any race)	4,395	4,276	2,290	98.19%	98.68%	96.75%
Total	4,476	4,333	2,367	100.00%	100.00%	100.00%

As of the census of 2000, there were 4,476 people, 1,035 households, and 963 families residing in the CDP. The population density was 2,520.5 inhabitants per square mile (973.2/km^{2}). There were 1,117 housing units at an average density of 629.0 per square mile (242.9/km^{2}). The racial makeup of the CDP was 91.35% White, 0.20% African American, 0.04% Asian, 7.19% from other races, and 1.21% from two or more races. Hispanic or Latino of any race were 98.19% of the population.

There were 1,035 households, out of which 61.4% had children under the age of 18 living with them, 70.3% were married couples living together, 16.7% had a female householder with no husband present, and 6.9% were non-families. 6.3% of all households were made up of individuals, and 3.0% had someone living alone who was 65 years of age or older. The average household size was 4.32 and the average family size was 4.49.

In the CDP, the population was spread out, with 40.0% under the age of 18, 14.7% from 18 to 24, 26.2% from 25 to 44, 14.3% from 45 to 64, and 4.8% who were 65 years of age or older. The median age was 23 years. For every 100 females, there were 98.8 males. For every 100 females age 18 and over, there were 92.1 males.

The median income for a household in the CDP was $17,935, and the median income for a family was $19,149. Males had a median income of $12,563 versus $15,518 for females. The per capita income for the CDP was $5,254. About 46.1% of families and 54.0% of the population were below the poverty line, including 58.5% of those under age 18 and 30.8% of those age 65 or over.

== Education ==
The Edinburg Consolidated Independent School District (ECISD) and the Pharr-San Juan-Alamo Independent School District (PSJAISD) serve sections of Lopezville.

Zoned ECISD elementary schools serving sections of Lopezville include De Escandon and Ramirez (grades PK-5). All residents of the ECISD section of Lopezville are zoned to South Middle School, and Edinburg High School (9-12). Robert Vela High School included ECISD parts formerly in the CDP.

Zoned PSJAISD schools include Arnoldo Cantu, Sr. Elementary School (North San Juan), R. Yzaguirre Middle School (SJMS), and PSJA High School.

In addition, South Texas Independent School District operates magnet schools that serve the community.

All of Hidalgo County is in the service area of South Texas College.
