= Pharr-San Juan-Alamo Memorial High School =

Public school in Texas, United States

PSJA Memorial Early College High School

Location
- 800 S Alamo Rd; Alamo, Texas 78516; United States
- Coordinates: 26°10′25″N 98°07′24″W

Information
- Type: Public high school
- Motto: A Wolverine is: Positive, Responsible, Optimistic, University-Bound, and Dedicated. A Wolverine is PROUD!
- School district: Pharr-San Juan-Alamo Independent School District
- Principal: Raquel Garcia
- Teaching staff: 130.69 (FTE) (2023–2024)
- Grades: 9–12
- Gender: Co-educational
- Enrollment: 1,946 (2023–2024)
- Student to teacher ratio: 14.89 (2023–2024)
- Colors: Green, black, and white
- Mascot: Wolverines
- Website: www.psjaisd.us/wolverines

Pharr-San Juan-Alamo (PSJA) Memorial Early College High School is a public high school in Alamo, Texas (U.S.). It is part of the Pharr-San Juan-Alamo Independent School District and is one of the district's six high schools.

Located at 800 South Alamo Road, the school serves students in grades 9th through 12 grade. The principal is Raquel Garcia.

== Student demographics ==
The demographic breakdown by race/ethnicity of the 1,812 students enrolled for the 2018–2019 school year was:

Enrollment by Race/Ethnicity
School Year	American Indian / Alaska Native	Asian	Black	Hispanic	Native Hawaiian / Pacific Islander	White	Two or More Races
2018–19	1 (0.1%)	3 (0.2%)	5 (0.3%)	1,794 (99%)	0 (0%)	9 (0.5%)	0 (0%)

== Attendance area and feeder patterns ==
The school's attendance boundary includes most of Alamo as well as parts of San Juan, and the census-designated place of North Alamo.

Feeder elementary schools include Farias, Marcia Garza, Guerra, Santos Livas, John KcKeever, Reed Mock, and Sergeant Trevino. Feeder middle schools include Alamo and Audie Murphy.

== Notable alumni ==
- Rossy Evelin Lima – Mexican-American poet
