= Valley View Independent School District (Hidalgo County, Texas) =

School district in Texas, United States

Address
- 9701 South Jackson Road Pharr, Texas, USA ESC Region 1
- Coordinates: 26°6′40″N 98°13′14″W

District information
- Type: Independent School District
- Motto: Inspiring Excellence - Fostering Well-Being
- Grades: PK-12
- Established: 1927; 99 years ago
- Superintendent: Dr. Monica Luna
- Governing agency: Texas Education Agency
- Schools: 7
- NCES District ID: 4843800

Students and staff
- Students: 3,305 (2025-2026)
- Athletic conference: UIL Class AAAA
- District mascot: Tigers
- Colors: Royal Blue; Gold

Other information
- Website: www.vviewisd.net

Valley View Independent School District (Valley View ISD or VVISD) is a public school district in unincorporated Hidalgo County, Texas, United States. Located 2 miles from the Mexico border near Pharr and McAllen, the district covers approximately 10 square miles, including portions of Hidalgo, McAllen, and Pharr.

As of 2026, Valley View ISD currently operates 7 campuses, including 2 high schools, 1 junior high school, and 4 elementary schools. The district most recently received an "A" rating from the Texas Education Agency (TEA).

== History ==
Valley View ISD was founded in 1927. As of 1984, the district operated a single K-8 campus, Valley View Elementary School. In 1985, Valley View Junior High School was established with grades 6-8. VVES transitioned to a PK-5 configuration. In 1986, VVJH added 9th grade.

1988 saw the addition of Valley View Primary School with grades PK-2. VVES became Valley View Intermediate School, with students in grades 3-5. This year was also the beginning of VVJH's transition into Valley View High School, as VVJH added a higher grade level and subtracted a lower grade level each year over the next 3 years.

In 1989, 3rd grade moved to VVPS, 6th grade moved to VVIS, and VVJH added 10th grade to become a 7-10 campus. As VVJH added grade 11 in 1990, becoming an 8-11 campus, VVIS added 7th grade to become a 4-7 campus.

1990 was the last transition year for a while, as Valley View HS (9-12) was finally established. VVIS became the new VVJH campus with grades 6-8, and VVPS became the new VVES with grades PK-5.

Valley View Alternative Education Program (AEP) opened in 1997, followed by Valley View North Elementary School in 1998 and Valley View Juvenile Justice AEP (JJAEP) in 1999. None of these additions changed the district's grade configuration.

Wilber E. Lucas Elementary was opened in 2002, named after one of the founders of VVISD. Valley View South Elementary School followed in 2006. In 2008, the Valley View 6th Grade Campus opened, leaving VVJH with grade 7-8.

2010 brought major changes to the district's grade configuration. Valley View Early College Campus was opened with grades 8-9, leaving VVJH with grades 6-7 and VVHS with 10-12. The 6th Grade Campus became a 5th Grade Campus, as the elementary campuses moved to a PK-4 setup.

No major changes occurred until 2021, when the 5th Grade Campus closed due to districtwide budget cuts. 2023 saw the most recent changes, with the Early College Campus replacing 8th grade with 10th grade, VVJH replacing 6th grade with 8th grade, and the elementary schools reconfiguring to house PK-6.

== Schools ==
Name	Grades	Established	Additional information
Valley View High School	11-12	1990	
Valley View Early College Campus	9-10	2010	
Valley View Junior High School	7-8	1985	
Valley View Elementary School	PK-6	1927	2017-18 National Blue Ribbon School
Valley View North Elementary School	PK-6	1998	
Valley View South Elementary School	PK-6	2006	2017-18 National Blue Ribbon School
Wilber E. Lucas Elementary School	PK-6	2002	Named after a founder of the VVISD
