= Hidalgo, Texas =

- City
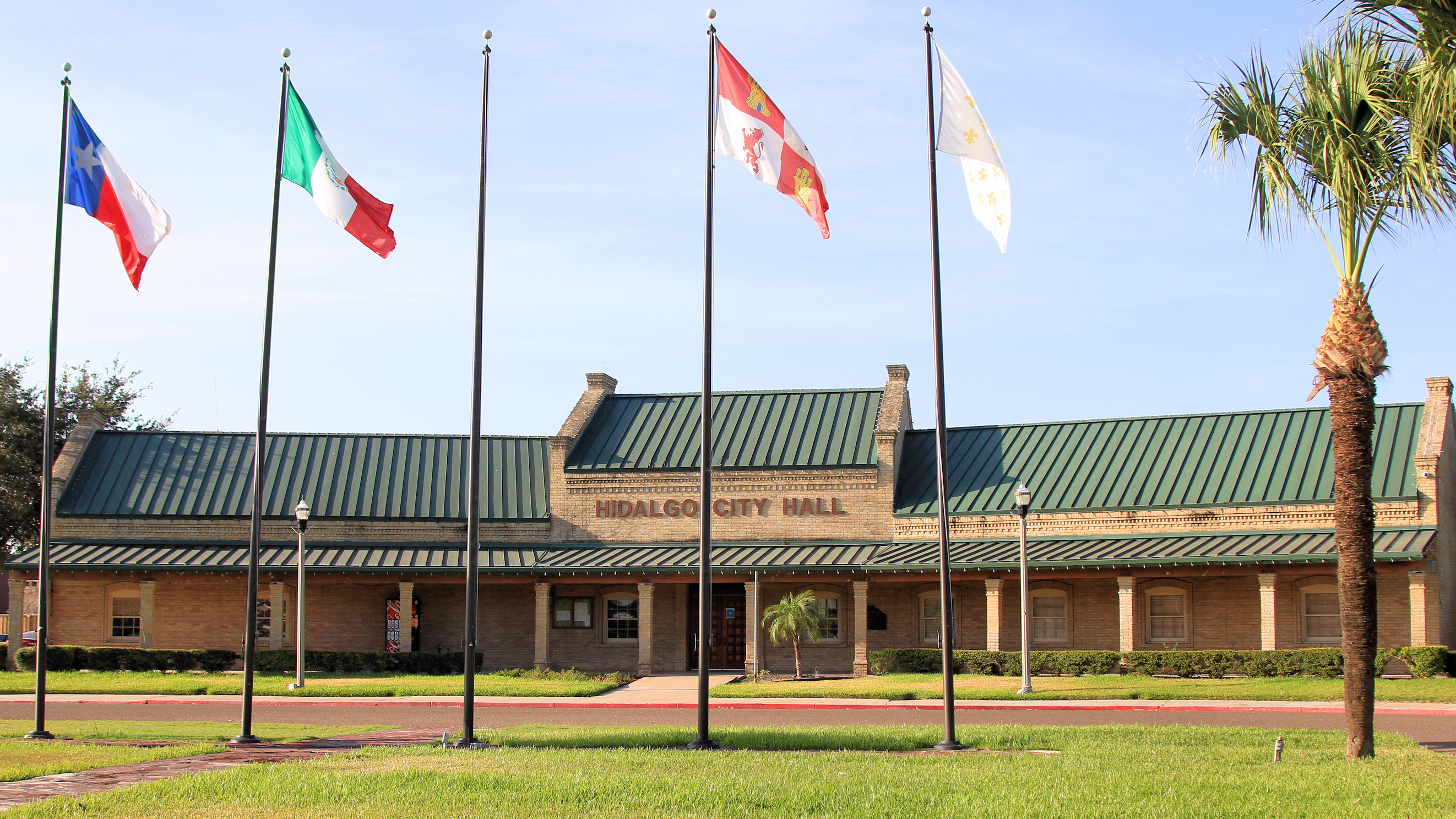
- Hidalgo City Hall

- Location of Hidalgo, within Hidalgo County, Texas

- Location of Hidalgo in Texas Location of Hidalgo in the US
- Coordinates: 26°6′16″N 98°14′47″W
- Country: United States
- State: Texas
- County: Hidalgo

Government
  - Mayor: Sergio Coronado

Area
  - Total: 8.46 sq mi (21.90 km^{2})
  - Land: 8.35 sq mi (21.62 km^{2})
  - Water: 0.11 sq mi (0.28 km^{2})
- Elevation: 102 ft (31 m)

Population (2020)
  - Total: 13,964
  - Density: 1,699.1/sq mi (656.02/km^{2})
- Time zone: UTC-6 (Central (CST))
  - Summer (DST): UTC-5 (CDT)
- ZIP code: 78557
- Area code: 956
- FIPS code: 48-33560
- GNIS feature ID: 1374059
- Website: cityofhidalgo.net

Hidalgo (hee-DAHL-goh /hɪˈdælɡoʊ/) is a city in Hidalgo County, Texas, United States. Its population was 11,198 at the 2010 census, and in 2020, the population had risen to 13,964.

== History ==
The area that is now Hidalgo was first settled by Spanish colonists led by José de Escandón circa 1749. The colony was known by multiple names: La Habitación, Rancho San Luis, and San Luisito. In 1852, John Young settled in the area and renamed the town "Edinburgh" after his place of birth, Edinburgh, Scotland; Edinburg became the county seat of Hidalgo County. The town was incorporated in 1876, and its name was changed to "Hidalgo" in 1885.

== Geography ==
Hidalgo is located in southern Hidalgo County at 26°6′16″N 98°14′47″W (26.104473, –98.246443). It is located across the Rio Grande (Rio Bravo del Norte) from the Mexican city of Reynosa.

One of the southern termini of US 281 is at the border crossing in Hidalgo. The highway leads east then north 12 miles (19 km) to Pharr, or southeast 54 miles (87 km) to Brownsville. Texas State Highway 115 runs north from Hidalgo 8 miles (13 km) to McAllen, the largest city in Hidalgo County.

According to the United States Census Bureau, the city of Hidalgo has a total area of 6.7 square miles (17.3 km^{2}), of which 0.1 sq mi (0.3 km^{2}), or 1.84%, is covered by water.

== Demographics ==
Historical population
Census	Pop.	Note	%±
1880	259		—
1890	389		50.2%
1930	630		—
1960	1,078		—
1970	1,289		19.6%
1980	2,288		77.5%
1990	3,292		43.9%
2000	7,322		122.4%
2010	11,198		52.9%
2020	13,964		24.7%
U.S. Decennial Census

=== 2020 census ===
As of the 2020 census, Hidalgo had a population of 13,964 people living in 3,739 households, including 3,220 families. The median age was 30.3 years; 29.9% of residents were under the age of 18 and 9.7% were 65 years of age or older. For every 100 females there were 91.5 males, and for every 100 females age 18 and over there were 89.1 males age 18 and over.

96.0% of residents lived in urban areas, while 4.0% lived in rural areas.

There were 3,739 households in Hidalgo, of which 56.0% had children under the age of 18 living in them. Of all households, 59.3% were married-couple households, 10.6% were households with a male householder and no spouse or partner present, and 26.7% were households with a female householder and no spouse or partner present. About 10.0% of all households were made up of individuals and 4.7% had someone living alone who was 65 years of age or older.

There were 3,964 housing units, of which 5.7% were vacant. The homeowner vacancy rate was 1.1% and the rental vacancy rate was 6.2%.

Racial composition as of the 2020 census
Race	Number	Percent
White	3,646	26.1%
Black or African American	22	0.2%
American Indian and Alaska Native	72	0.5%
Asian	11	0.1%
Native Hawaiian and Other Pacific Islander	6	0.0%
Some other race	4,351	31.2%
Two or more races	5,856	41.9%
Hispanic or Latino (of any race)	13,648	97.7%

=== 2000 census ===
As of the 2000 census, 7,322 people, 1,747 households, and 1,593 families lived in the city. The population density was 1,682.2 inhabitants per square mile (649.5/km^{2}). The 1,880 housing units had an average density of 431.9 per square mile (166.8/km^{2}). The racial makeup of the city was 82.12% White, 0.12% African American, 0.29% Native American, 0.12% Asian, 15.45% from other races, and 1.90% from two or more races. Hispanics or Latinos of any race were 97.75% of the population.

Of the 1,747 households, 61.9% had children under 18 living with them, 66.1% were married couples living together, 21.0% had a female householder with no husband present, and 8.8% were not families. About 8.1% of all households were made up of individuals, and 4.7% had someone living alone who was 65 or older. The average household size was 4.19 and the average family size was 4.43.

In the city, the age distribution was 39.0% under 18, 11.6% from 18 to 24, 28.0% from 25 to 44, 14.7% from 45 to 64, and 6.6% who were 65 or older. The median age was 25 years. For every 100 females, there were 88.6 males. For every 100 females 18 and over, there were 82.4 males.

The median income for a household in the city was $19,469, and for a family was $20,357. Males had a median income of $16,238 versus $13,577 for females. The per capita income for the city was $5,849. About 41.4% of families and 44.3% of the population were below the poverty line, including 51.2% of those under 18 and 45.5% of those 65 or over.

== Government and infrastructure ==
The United States Postal Service operates the Hidalgo Post Office.

== Education ==
Hidalgo Independent School District and Valley View Independent School District serve sections of the city.

The portion in Hidalgo ISD is divided between the zones of Hidalgo Elementary School and Salinas Elementary School. All residents of the Hidalgo ISD area are zoned to Ida Diaz Jr. High School, and Hidalgo Early College High School. In addition, South Texas Independent School District operates magnet schools that serve the community.

The Hidalgo Public Library serves Hidalgo. The library, designed by Hidalgo native Eduardo Vela, opened on April 8, 1998.

== Sports ==
Hidalgo was the home to the Rio Grande Valley Vipers of the NBA G League, who played in the local Payne Arena. Former teams include the Rio Grande Valley Magic of the Southern Indoor Football League, the Rio Grande Valley Killer Bees of the Central Hockey League, and North American Hockey League, La Fiera FC of the Professional Arena Soccer League, and the Rio Grande Valley Sol of the Lone Star Football League and X-League Indoor Football. The Payne Arena is also a concert venue serving the McAllen–Edinburg–Mission and Reynosa–McAllen metropolitan areas.

== Killer Bee Capital of the World ==
The first colony of killer bees in the U.S. was documented just outside Hidalgo in 1990. Municipal leaders turned a potential PR nightmare into an opportunity, declaring their city the 'Killer Bee Capital of the World'. They hired an artist to create a two thousand pound monument to the invading bees. It was installed next to city hall and has become a tourist attraction.
