= Providence Township, Pennsylvania =

Providence Township, Pennsylvania may refer to:

- Providence Township, Bedford County, Pennsylvania, formed in 1780 and split in 1854 into:
  - East Providence Township, Bedford County, Pennsylvania
  - West Providence Township, Pennsylvania
- Providence Township, Chester County, Pennsylvania, which split in 1687, and then formed part of Delaware county in 1789, yielding:
  - Nether Providence Township, Pennsylvania
  - Upper Providence Township, Delaware County, Pennsylvania
- Providence Township, Lancaster County, Pennsylvania
- Providence Township, Montgomery County, Pennsylvania, which split in 1805 into:
  - Lower Providence Township, Pennsylvania
  - Upper Providence Township, Montgomery County, Pennsylvania
