= 1829 in rail transport =

This article lists events related to rail transport that occurred in 1829.

== Events ==
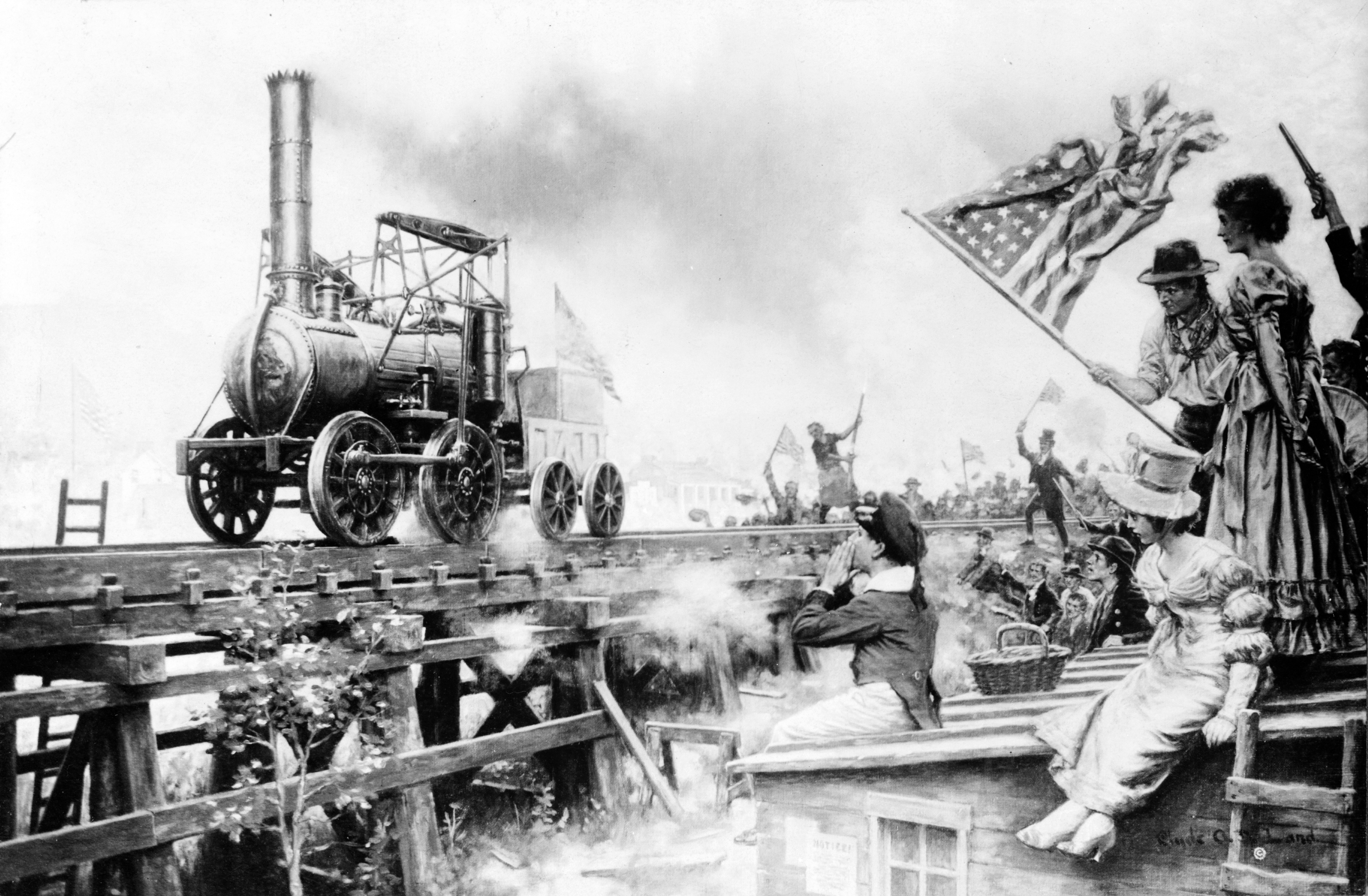
Stourbridge Lion's first run, recreated ca. 1916

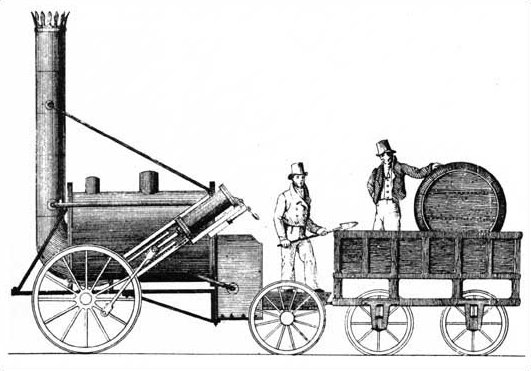
Stephenson's Rocket, contemporary drawing

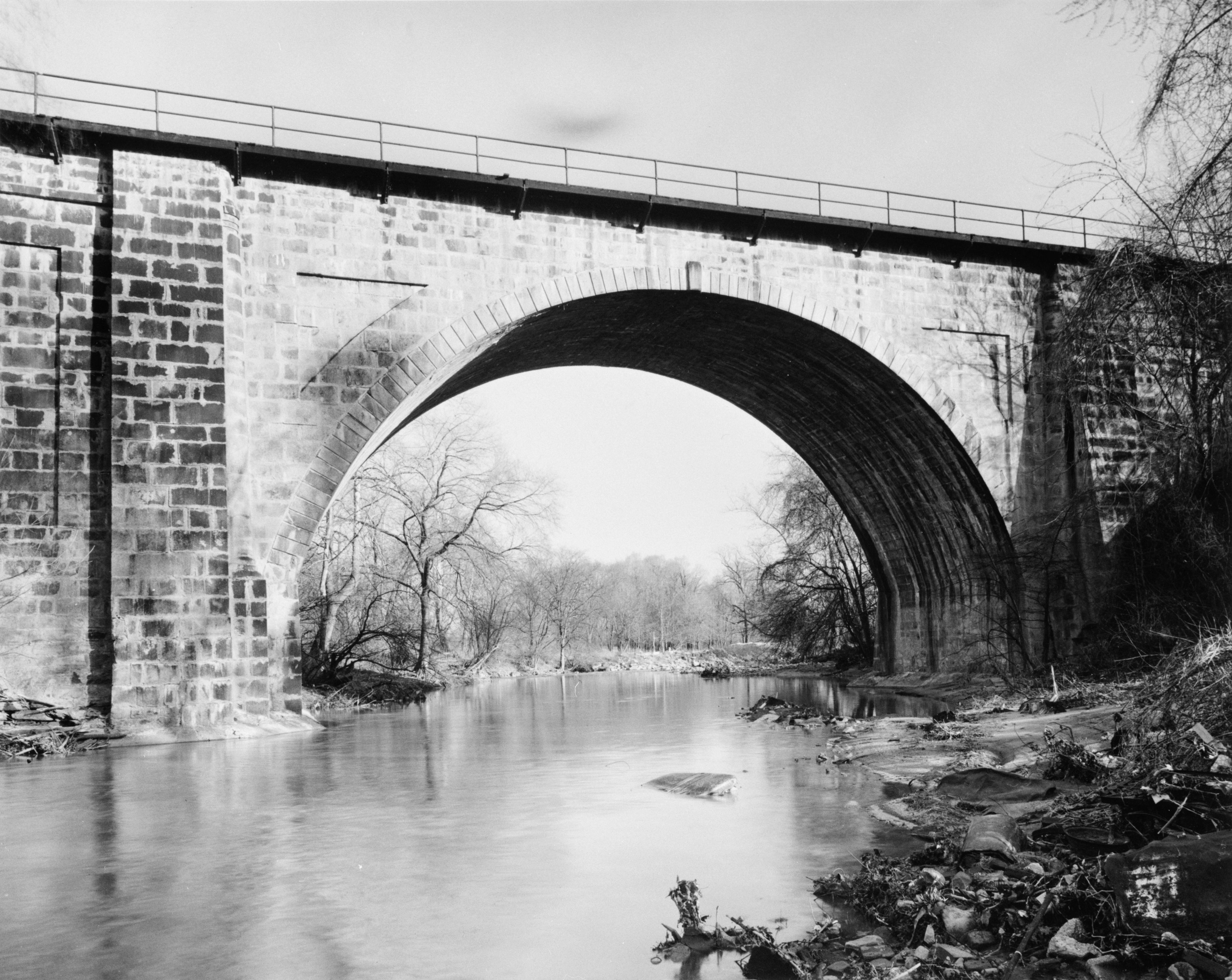
Carrollton Viaduct, in 1971

=== August events ===
- August 8 – The Stourbridge Lion, the first steam locomotive delivered to the Delaware and Hudson Railway, operates for the first time in Honesdale, Pennsylvania.
- August 25 – Tom Thumb, the first American-built steam locomotive used on a common carrier railroad, is operated in a race against a horsecar.

=== October events ===
- October 6–14 – The Rainhill Trials, an important competition in the early days of steam locomotive railways, was run near Rainhill, east of Liverpool, England and won by Stephenson's Rocket.

=== December events ===
- December 21 – Baltimore and Ohio Railroad's Carrollton Viaduct, the first stone masonry railroad bridge in the United States and the world's second oldest railway bridge still in use (the world's oldest is the Skerne Bridge, Darlington, UK of 1824–1825), is opened for service.

=== Unknown date events ===
- The Leiper Railroad, connecting Crum Creek to Ridley Creek, Pennsylvania closes to be replaced by the Leiper Canal.

== Births ==
=== May births ===
- May 28 – Albert Bowman Rogers, American surveyor who found Rogers Pass for the Canadian Pacific Railway (d. 1889).

=== June births ===
- June 5 – George Stephen, first president of Canadian Pacific Railway Limited 1881–1888 (d. 1921).
