= Providence Township =

Providence Township may refer to:

== Iowa ==
- Providence Township, Buena Vista County, Iowa
- Providence Township, Hardin County, Iowa

== Minnesota ==
- Providence Township, Lac qui Parle County, Minnesota

== North Carolina ==
- Providence Township, Pasquotank County, North Carolina, in Pasquotank County, North Carolina
- Providence Township, Randolph County, North Carolina, in Randolph County, North Carolina
- Providence Township, Rowan County, North Carolina

== Ohio ==
- Providence Township, Lucas County, Ohio

== Pennsylvania ==
- Providence Township, Bedford County, Pennsylvania
- Providence Township, Chester County, Pennsylvania
- Providence Township, Lancaster County, Pennsylvania
- Providence Township, Montgomery County, Pennsylvania
