= Providence Township, North Carolina =

Providence Township, North Carolina may refer to one of the following places:

- Providence Township, Pasquotank County, North Carolina
- Providence Township, Randolph County, North Carolina
- Providence Township, Rowan County, North Carolina

See also

- Providence, North Carolina (disambiguation)
- Providence Township (disambiguation)
