= Providence Township, Iowa =

Providence Township, Iowa may refer to one of the following places:

- Providence Township, Buena Vista County, Iowa
- Providence Township, Hardin County, Iowa

See also

- Providence Township (disambiguation)
