= Nether Providence Township, Pennsylvania =

Township in Pennsylvania, US

Nether Providence Township
- Township
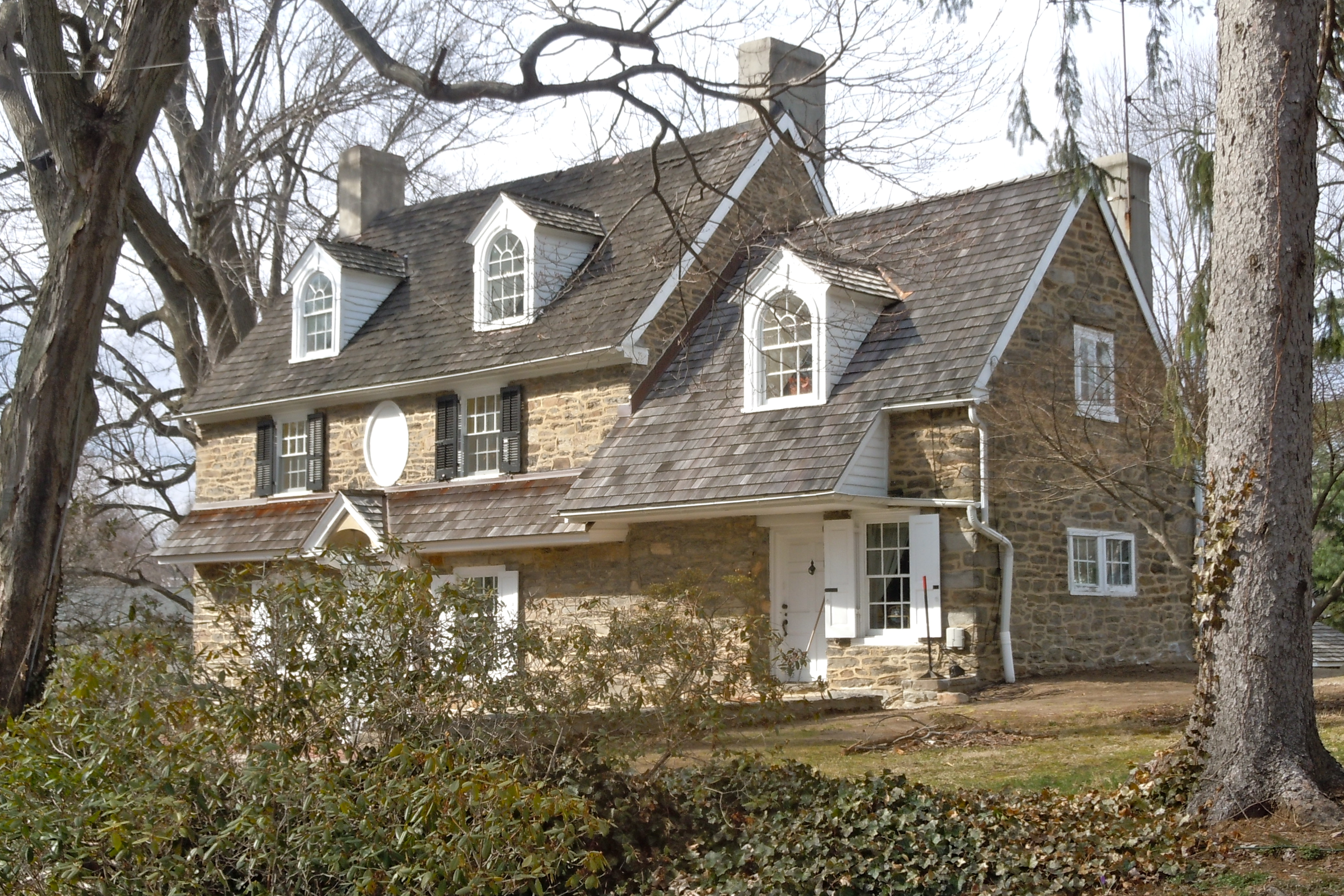
- Wolley Stille, ca. 1692-1700
- Motto: A beautiful place to call home
- Location in Delaware County and the U.S. state of Pennsylvania
- Coordinates: 39°54′38″N 75°22′13″W
- Country: United States
- State: Pennsylvania
- County: Delaware

Area
  - Total: 4.72 sq mi (12.23 km^{2})
  - Land: 4.71 sq mi (12.21 km^{2})
  - Water: 0.0077 sq mi (0.02 km^{2})
- Elevation: 240 ft (73 m)

Population (2010)
  - Total: 13,706
  - Estimate (2016): 13,779
  - Density: 2,923.5/sq mi (1,128.76/km^{2})
- Time zone: UTC-5 (EST)
  - Summer (DST): UTC-4 (EDT)
- Area code: 610
- FIPS code: 42-045-53104
- Website: www.netherprovidence.org

Nether Providence Township is a township in Delaware County, Pennsylvania, United States. Many residents refer to the township by the name of its largest community, Wallingford, because the Wallingford postal code is used for most of the township. The population of the township was 13,706 at the 2010 census.

== Geography ==
Nether Providence Township is located in central Delaware County at 39°53′40″N 75°22′25″W (39.894612, -75.373705). It is bordered to the north by the borough of Media, the county seat. Other neighboring municipalities are Upper Providence Township to the north; Springfield Township, the borough of Swarthmore, and Ridley Township to the east; the city of Chester to the south; and the boroughs of Brookhaven and Rose Valley to the west.

According to the United States Census Bureau, the township has a total area of 4.7 square miles (12.2 km^{2}), of which 0.01 square miles (0.02 km^{2}), or 0.17%, is water. Crum Creek forms the eastern boundary of the township, and Ridley Creek forms the western and southern border. Nether Providence's commercial area or downtown is located on Providence Road between the bridge over SEPTA's Media/Wawa line and Wallingford Avenue.

== History ==
The first recorded inhabitants of Nether Providence Township were Native Americans of the Lenape tribe, who lived in the area for about five hundred years, but by 1740 few remained. On August 14, 1682, two months before William Penn's landing in Chester, John Sharpless came to the area. Penn had given Sharpless a thousand-acre (4-km^{2}) tract, and he settled near Ridley Creek.

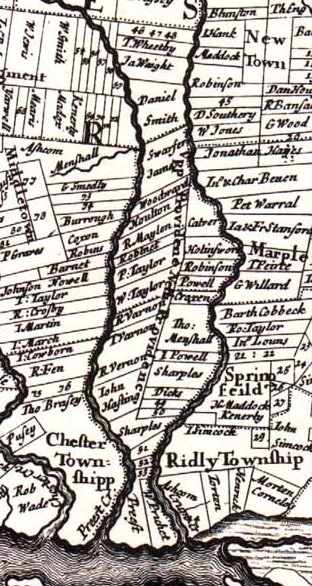
Thomas Holme's 1687 map of Pennsylvania, showing Ridley Creek (left) and Crum Creek (right), flowing into the Delaware River near Chester, Pennsylvania.

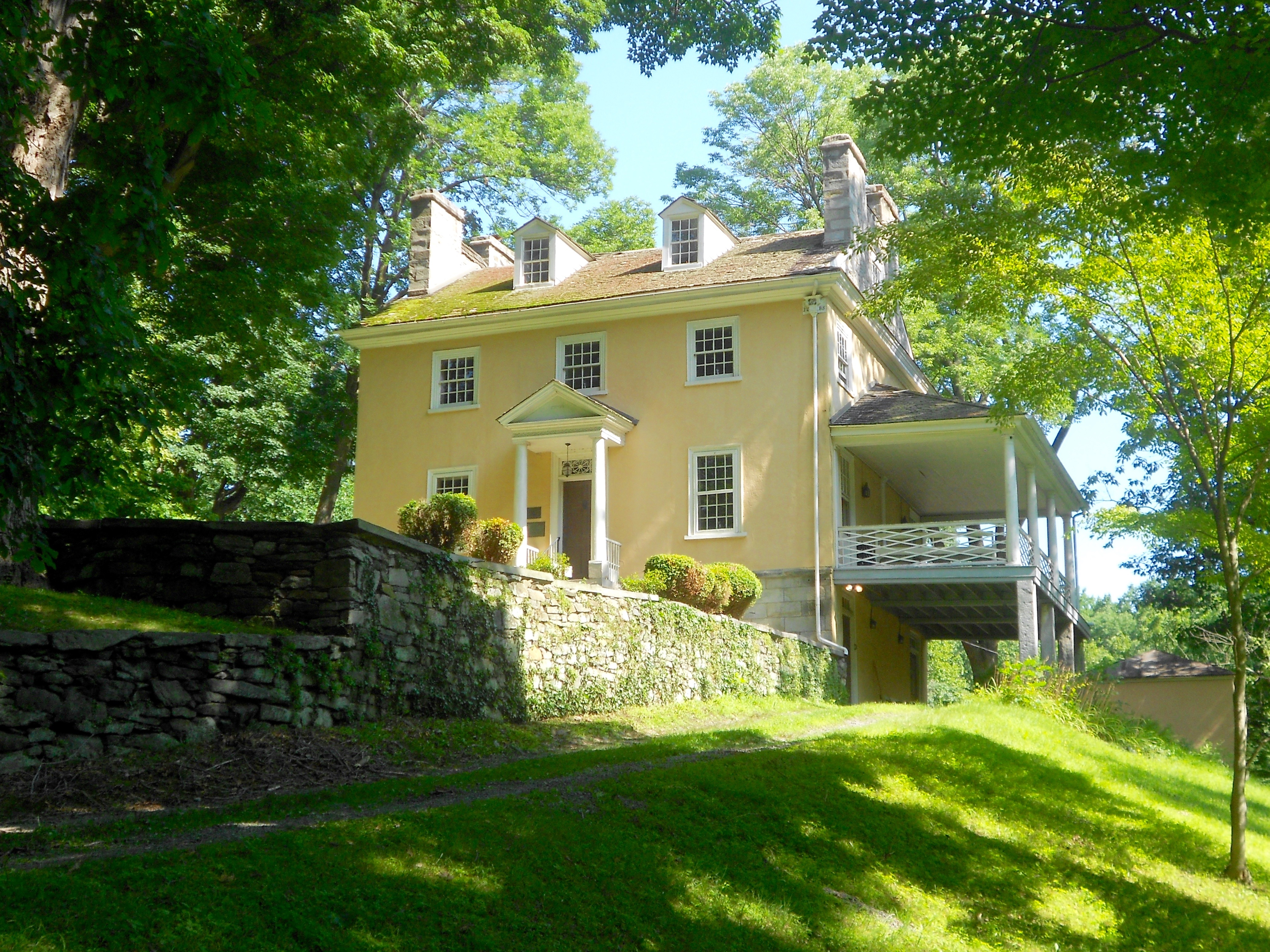
"Avondale," Thomas Leiper Estate

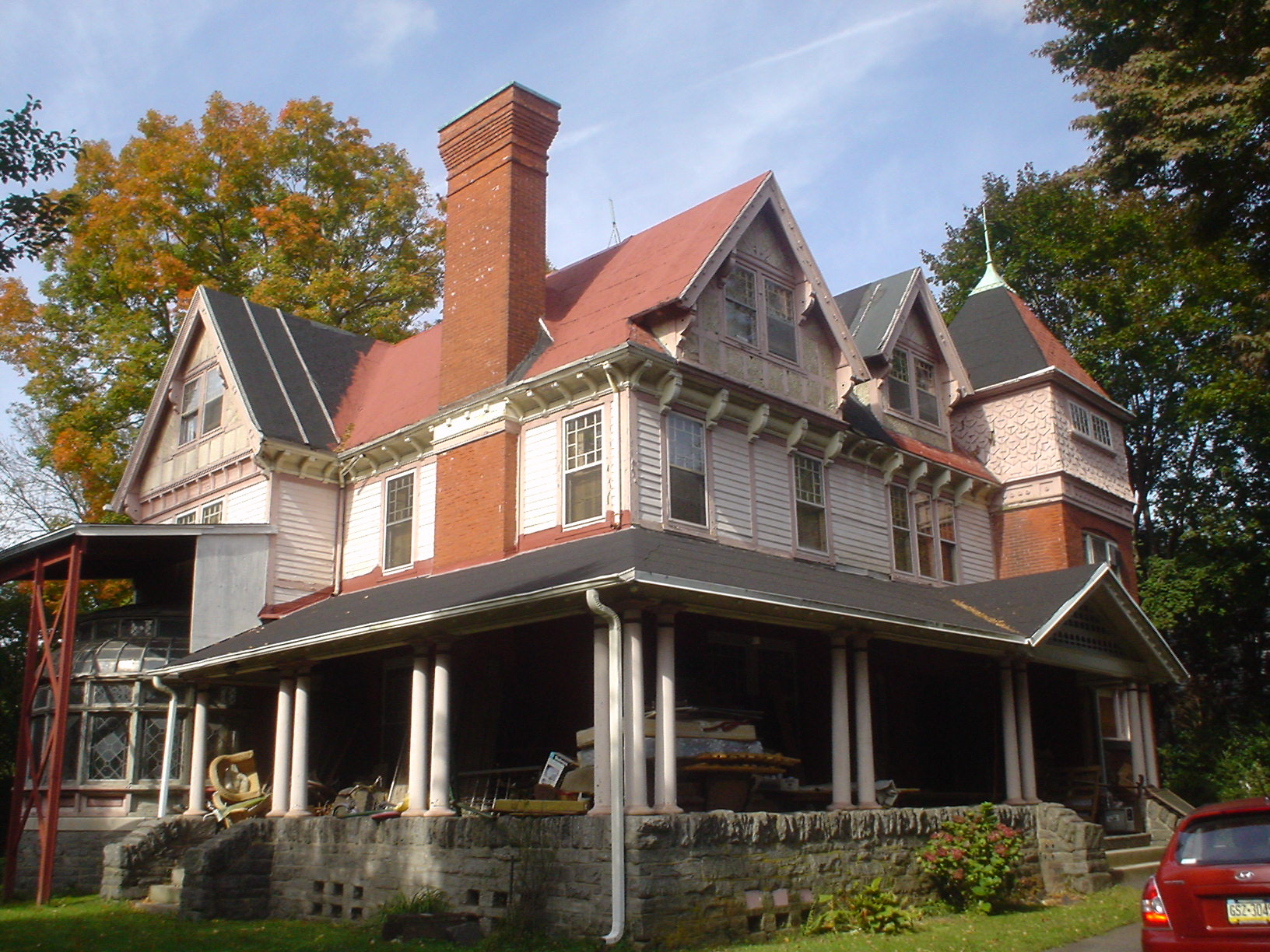
West Lawn, listed on the NRHP

By the time Penn arrived, there were several small settlements in the area, which became known as Providence Township. Providence Township comprised today's Nether Providence, Rose Valley, Media, and Upper Providence. On October 17, 1683, the residents of Providence Township petitioned the Court of Chester County, of which they were then a part, to establish a road from Providence to Chester. The court approved the creation of Providence Great Road (now Route 252).

Nether Providence went through four distinct phases from farming, to manufacturing, to resort, and finally, to residential community. By 1729, the area was producing sufficient crops to allow exporting to New England, Canada, and Europe.

Fourteen major mill complexes were built in Nether Providence, six on Crum Creek and eight on Ridley Creek. The first, a cotton mill along Crum Creek, was started by Thomas Allen in 1763. He named his mill for his hometown, Wallingford, England. The mills played an essential part in the growth of Nether Providence. Millhands lived in the self-contained villages that grew up around the mills.

After the Civil War, wealthy Philadelphians built summer residences and vacation resorts in the area.

The first railway was the Leiper Railroad, a horse-drawn quarry rail line, constructed in 1809–1810 and used to haul cut stone until about 1828. That early rail line was superseded by the Leiper Canal. The first steam-locomotive train came through in 1854; it used a single track with a sidetrack at Wallingford. The first post office in Nether Providence was established at Hinkson's Corner in 1873. Trolleys also contributed to the area's development. The first independent trolley was the Chester and Media Electric Railway, chartered in 1892. The last trolley through the township closed in 1938. The Nether Providence Police Department was established in 1935, and automobile parking was regulated in 1947 and speed in 1949.

Three sites within the township, Wolley Stille, the Thomas Leiper Estate, and Westlawn are listed on the National Register of Historic Places.

== Demographics ==
Historical population
| Census | Pop. | Note | %± |
|---|---|---|---|
| 1930 | 2,833 | | — |
| 1940 | 3,793 | | 33.9% |
| 1950 | 6,173 | | 62.7% |
| 1960 | 10,380 | | 68.2% |
| 1970 | 13,589 | | 30.9% |
| 1980 | 12,730 | | −6.3% |
| 1990 | 13,229 | | 3.9% |
| 2000 | 13,456 | | 1.7% |
| 2010 | 13,706 | | 1.9% |
| 2020 | 14,525 | | 6.0% |
U.S. Decennial Census

As of Census 2010, the racial makeup of the township was 85.6% White, 7.0% African American, 0.1% Native American, 5.2% Asian, 0.3% from other races, and 1.9% from two or more races. Hispanic or Latino of any race were 2.0% of the population .

As of the census of 2000, there were 13,456 people, 5,007 households, and 3,755 families residing in the township. The population density was 2,857.7 inhabitants per square mile (1,103.4/km^{2}). There were 5,125 housing units at an average density of 1,088.4 per square mile (420.2/km^{2}). The racial makeup of the township was 90.08% White, 6.12% African American, 0.10% Native American, 2.34% Asian, 0.04% Pacific Islander, 0.27% from other races, and 1.06% from two or more races. 1.13% of the population were Hispanic or Latino of any race.

There were 5,007 households, out of which 34.5% had children under the age of 18 living with them, 62.3% were married couples living together, 9.8% had a female householder with no husband present, and 25.0% were non-families. 21.7% of all households were made up of individuals, and 10.4% had someone living alone who was 65 years of age or older. The average household size was 2.62 and the average family size was 3.08.

In the township the population was spread out, with 25.4% under the age of 18, 4.9% from 18 to 24, 25.8% from 25 to 44, 26.3% from 45 to 64, and 17.5% who were 65 years of age or older. The median age was 42 years. For every 100 females, there were 90.8 males. For every 100 females age 18 and over, there were 85.8 males.

The median income for a household in the township was $68,059, and the median income for a family was $78,491. Males had a median income of $72,370 versus $49,048 for females. The per capita income for the township was $32,946. About 3.1% of families and 3.4% of the population were below the poverty line, including 5.2% of those under age 18 and 2.1% of those age 65 or over.

== Education ==
The first area school started in 1810. Nether Providence Township currently lies within the Wallingford-Swarthmore School District, created by a merger between the Nether Providence and Swarthmore-Rutledge School Districts in 1983. Public school students within the township attend either Nether Providence Elementary School, Swarthmore-Rutledge School or Wallingford Elementary School for grades K-5, depending on where they live. Strath Haven Middle School serves students in grades 6–8, and Strath Haven High School serves students in grades 9-12.

The township's only parochial school is the Mother of Providence Regional Catholic School, located in the southern part of the township, in Wallingford. It formed in 2012 from a merger of St. John Chrysostom in Wallingford and Nativity BVM School in Media. Originally Nativity BVM was to be the location of the merged school, but St. John Chrystosom appealed and the archdiocese changed its decision. Notre Dame Catholic Girls High School was formerly in Moylan. In 1981 it closed.

The township is also serviced by the Helen Kate Furness Free Library.

== Transportation ==
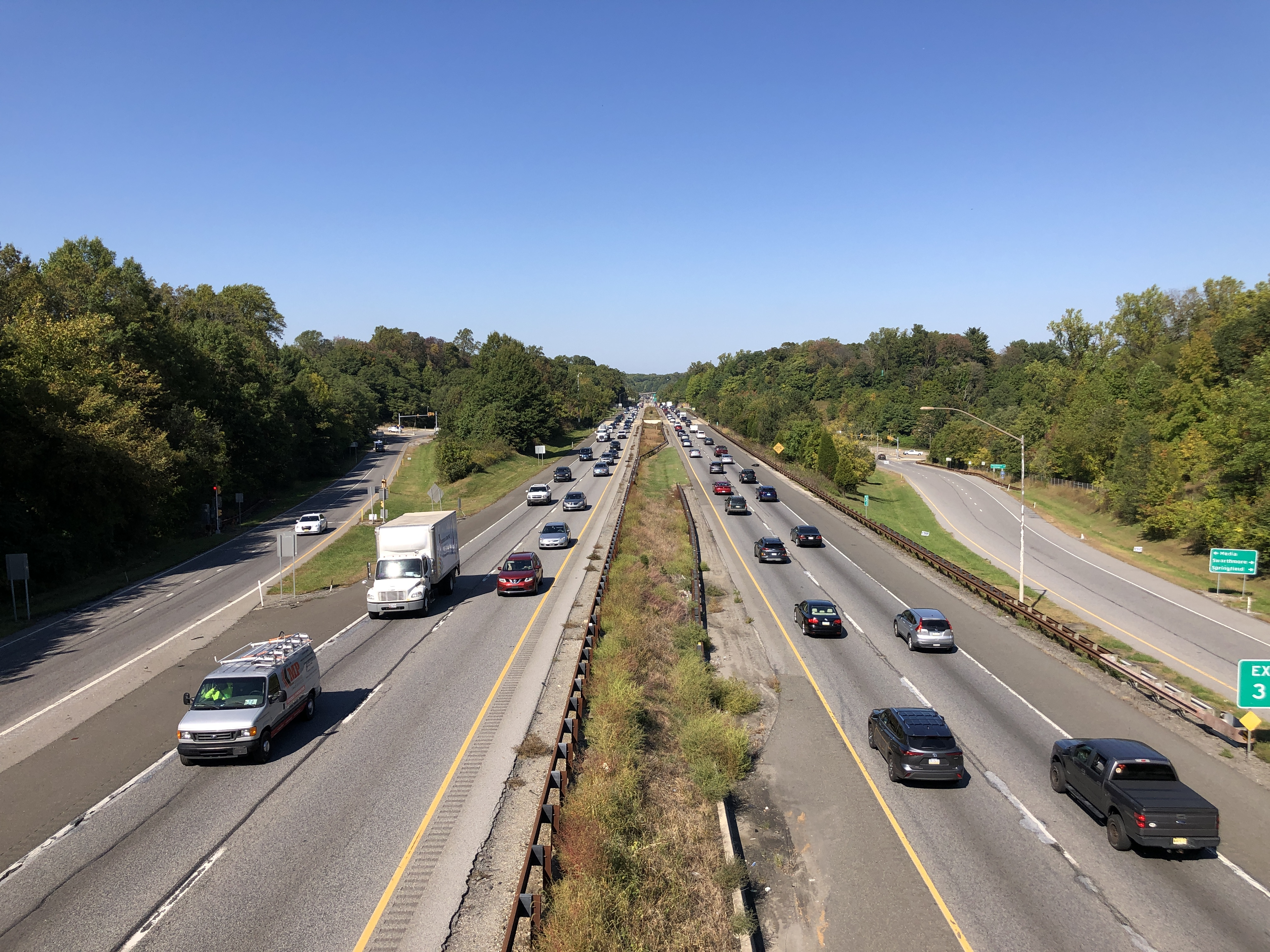
I-476 "Blue Route" northbound in Nether Providence Township

As of 2018, there were 62.89 miles (101.21 km) of public roads in Nether Providence Township, of which 17.45 miles (28.08 km) were maintained by Pennsylvania Department of Transportation (PennDOT) and 45.44 miles (73.13 km) were maintained by the township.

Interstate 476 runs up the east side of the township near Crum Creek, with access from Exit 3 (Baltimore Pike). Pennsylvania Route 252 follows Providence Road along a northwest-southeast alignment through the center of the township, while Pennsylvania Route 320 follows a southwest-northeast alignment through the southeastern corner of the township.

The township is served by SEPTA public transportation. Train stations in the township along SEPTA Regional Rail's Media/Wawa Line include: Moylan–Rose Valley, and Wallingford. SEPTA's light rail Media–Sharon Hill Line passes through the township along its route between Media and the 69th Street Transportation Center. SEPTA provides Suburban Bus service to Nether Providence Township along Route 109, which runs between the Chester Transit Center and the 69th Street Transportation Center, Route 110, which runs between Penn State Brandywine and the 69th Street Transportation Center, and Route 118, which runs between the Chester Transit Center and Newtown Square.

== Religious institutions ==
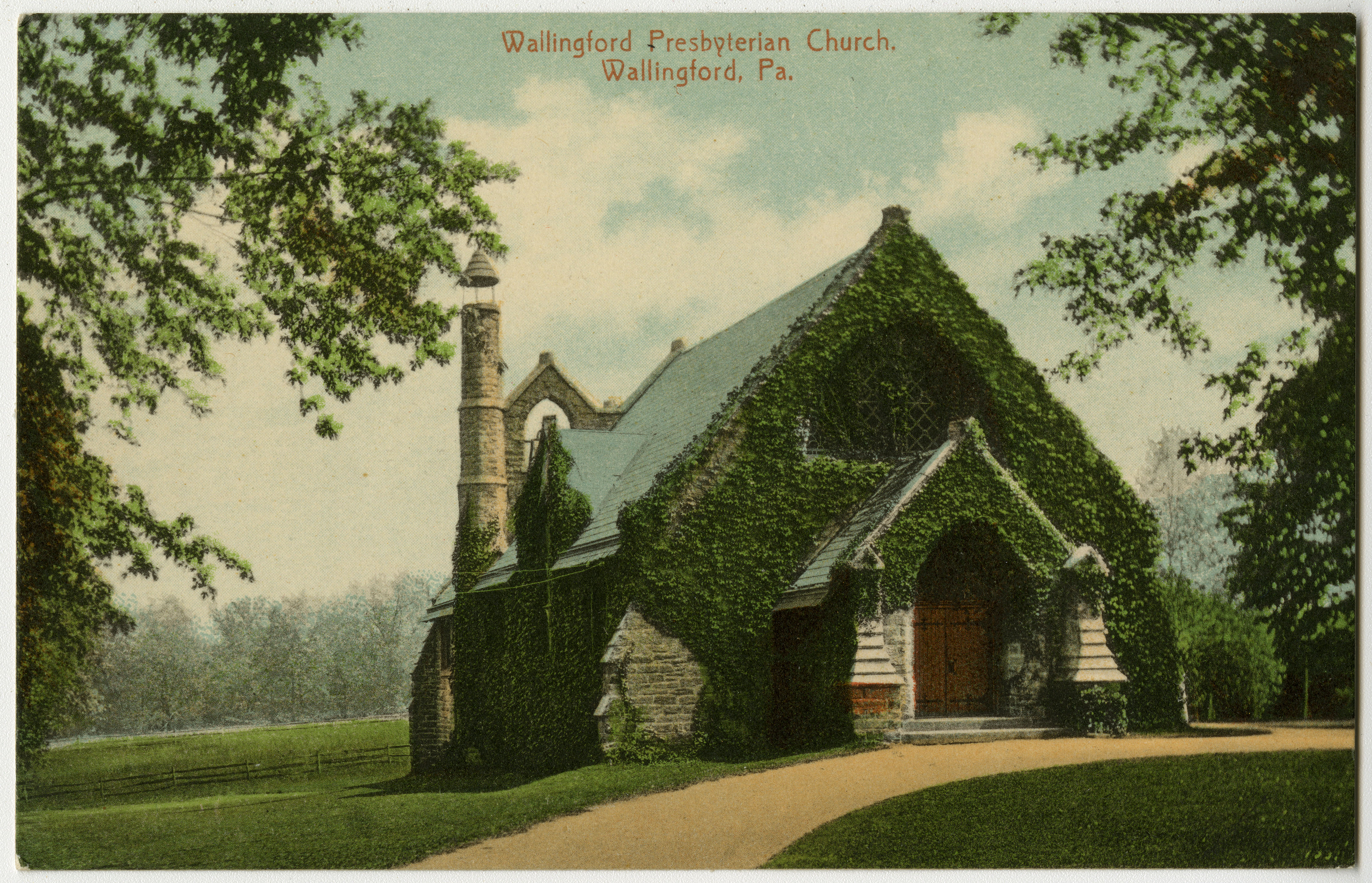
Wallingford Presbyterian on an old postcard

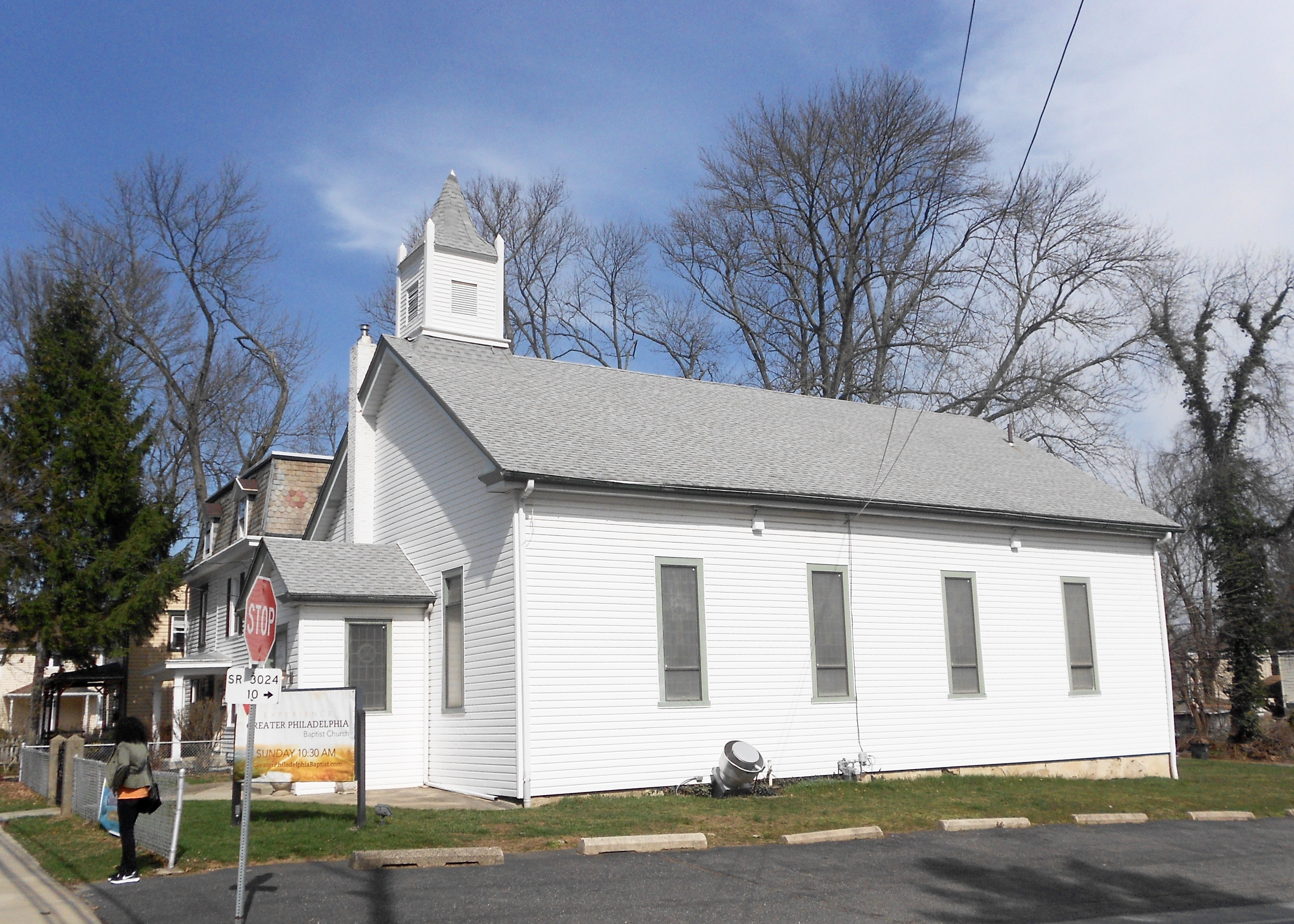
The Greater Philadelphia Baptist Church, formerly Zion AME

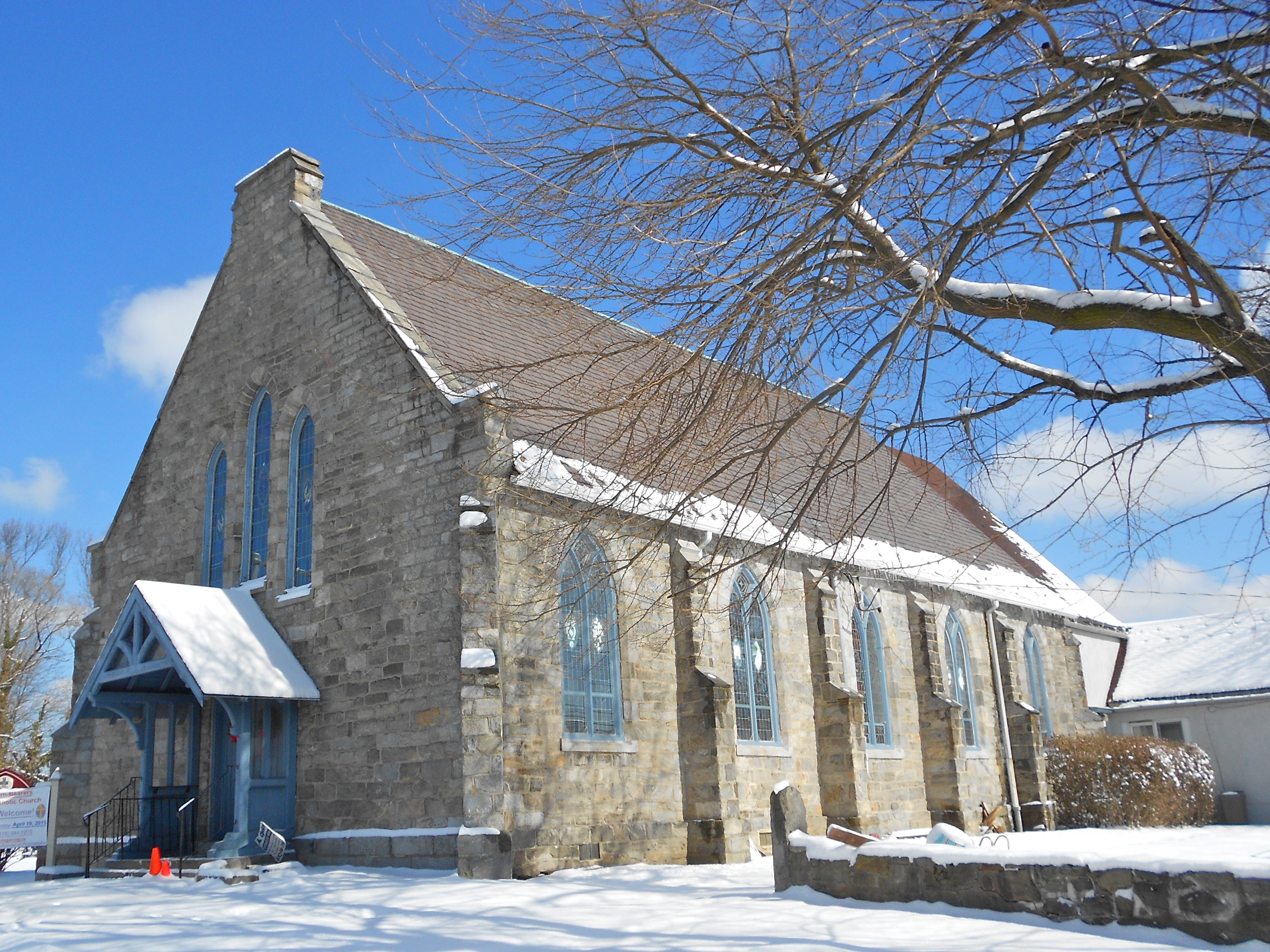
The former Leiper Presbyterian Church

Several religious congregations serve Nether Providence.

=== Holy Trinity Lutheran Church ===
Holy Trinity is a Lutheran church located approximately at the intersection of Harvey Road and route 252.

=== Ohev Shalom ===
Congregation Ohev Shalom is a synagogue located on route 320, at approximately the junction with route 252.

=== St. John Chrysostom ===
St. John Chrysostom is a Roman Catholic church on route 252, across from Springhaven Country Club.

=== Wallingford Presbyterian Church ===
Wallingford Presbyterian Church is a Presbyterian church located at the intersection of Brookhaven Road and Avondale Road.

=== Greater Philadelphia Baptist Church ===
Formerly occupied by Zion African Methodist Episcopal, the church building was occupied by the Greater Philadelphia Church in 2015. It is located in South Media at the intersection of Manchester Ave. and Wallingford Ave.

=== Leiper Church ===
The historic Leiper church is located on Fairview Road in Ridley. In 2015, it became home to Holy Myrrh Bearers Ukrainian Catholic church.

== Government and communities ==
Major communities in Nether Providence are Garden City, South Media and Wallingford. The South Media Fire Company was organized in 1922 and Garden City Fire Company in 1944. Ambulance service is provided by the Media Fire Company and Parkside Fire Company. The Moylan community near Rose Valley is also within Nether Providence Township, as are the Bowling Green, Park Ridge, Pine Ridge, and Wesley Manor communities located north of Baltimore Pike.

=== Garden City ===
Within Garden City area are the Waterville, Lapidea, Putnum Village, and Crum Creek Manor sections. The Crum Creek Manor section is known for its circular layout. Putnam Village is usually considered within the Garden City community. Garden City is known as a working class blue collar area, made up of row houses and ranch houses built for returning World War II veterans in the 1940s.

The small community of Garden City is located in the southernmost part of Nether Providence. It borders Chester city to the south, where it is cut off by Ridley Creek. It lies southwest of the intersection where Route 252 (South Providence Road) and Route 320 (Chester Road) meet, and it is cut off by Route 252 (or sometimes Harvey Road) at the east. The north and west borders of the community are disputed. Moore Road or Georgetown Road are loosely used as the northern border for Garden City. West Brookhaven Road (or in some cases Putnam Village) is often used as the western border of Garden City.

Garden City is home to the Garden City Fire Co., the Foundry Church, and the Creekside Swim Club. Nether Providence Elementary School is the elementary school for the Garden City Community and is often considered within Garden City.

=== South Media ===
South Media is an unincorporated community bordering the southern edge of Media. The neighborhood lies within the Media, PA 19063 postal code. It lies north of Wallingford and Rose Valley and west of North Providence Road. East Baltimore Avenue is usually considered the northern border. It is home to the South Media Fire Co., the oldest fire company in Nether Providence.

=== Moylan ===
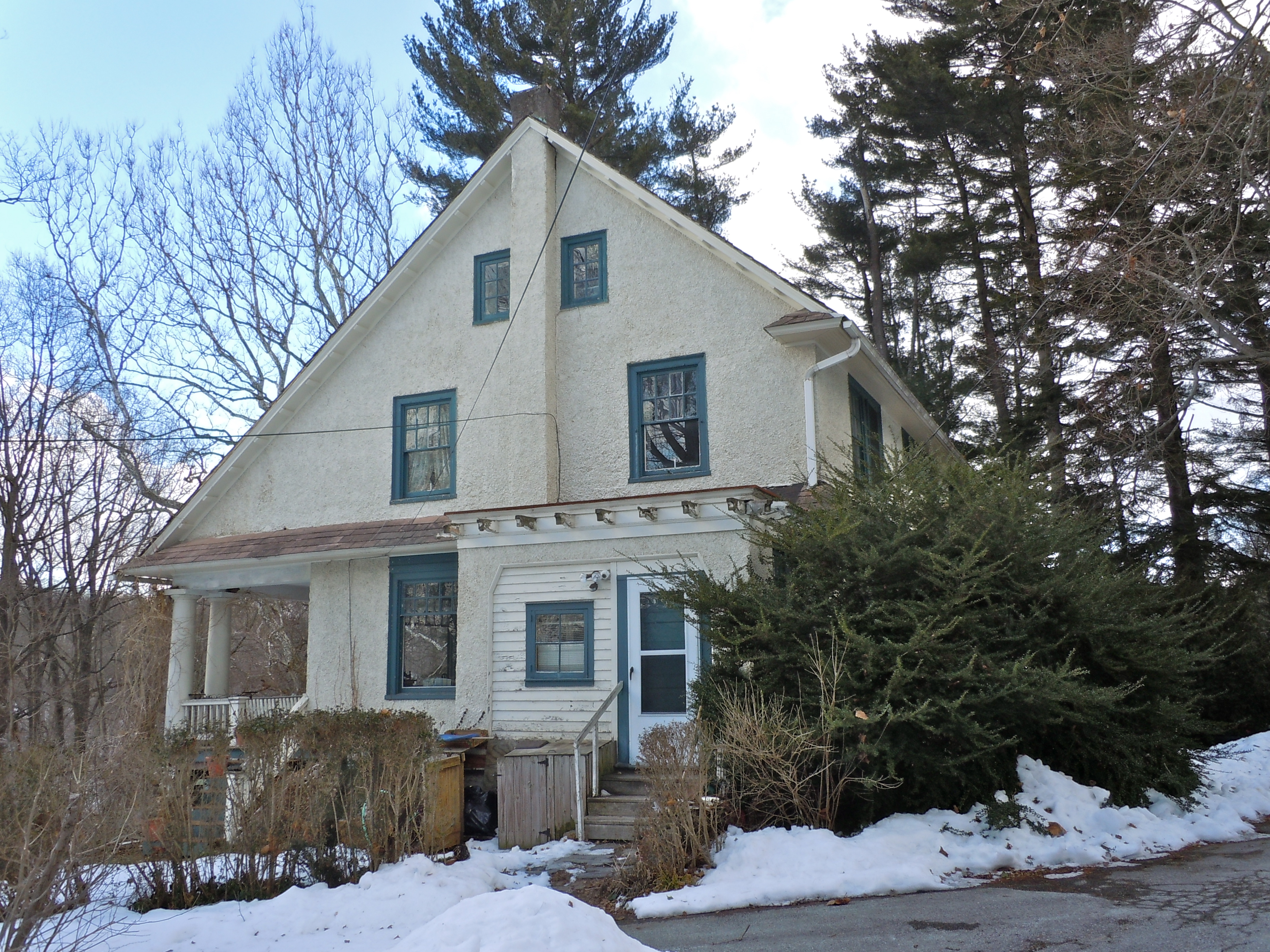
The house of Anna Howard Shaw in Moylan

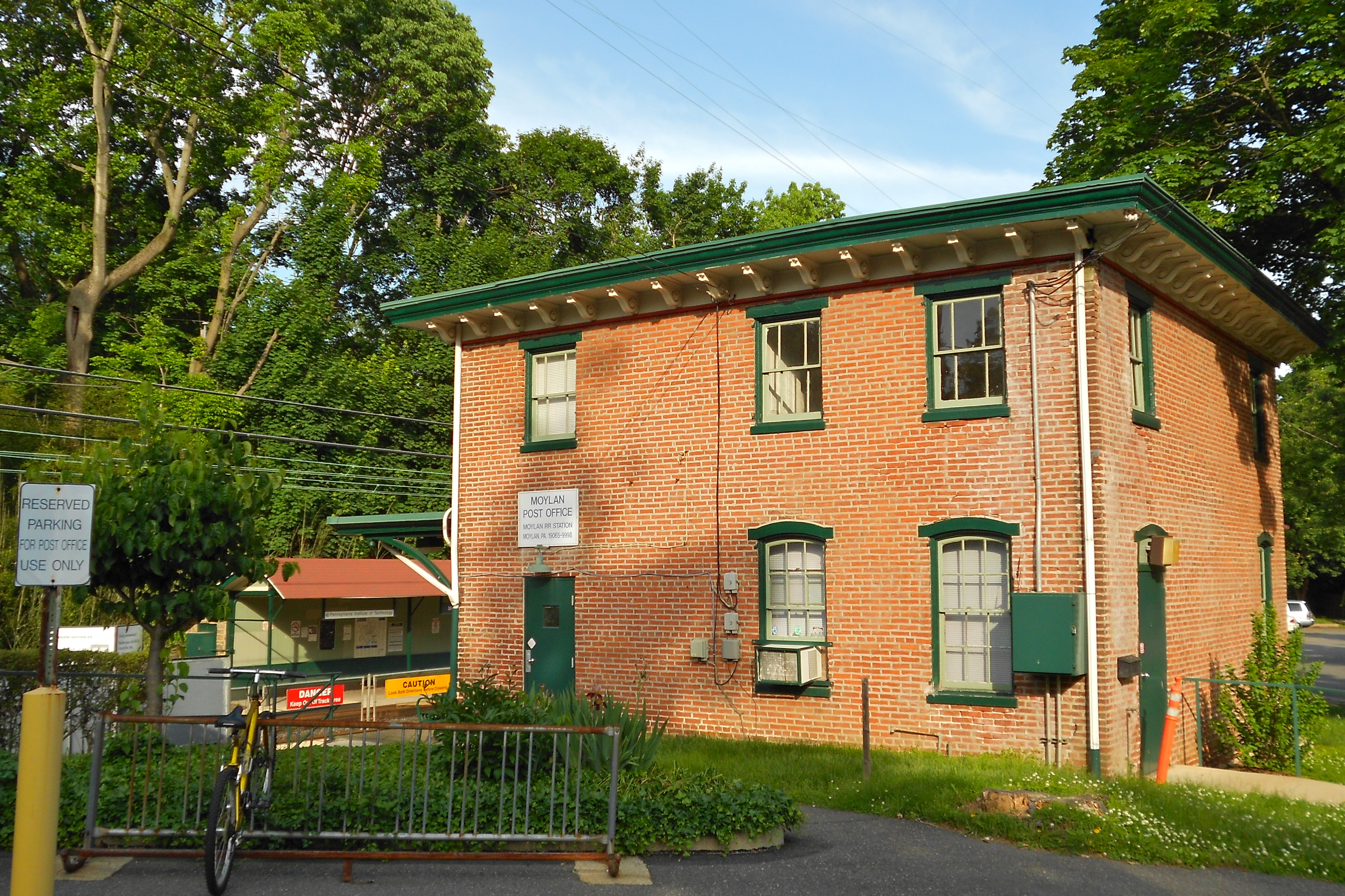
Moylan-Rose Valley SEPTA station

Moylan is an unincorporated community, founded on the land and tax reform principles of Henry George, located partially in Nether Providence township and partially in Rose Valley Borough. It is home to the Moylan – Rose Valley commuter train station on the Media/Wawa Line, which is located on Manchester Avenue. To the north Moylan borders the township of Upper Providence and the unincorporated community of South Media. The southern boundary is sometimes disputed, but it is approximately Rose Valley Road.

=== Wallingford ===
Wallingford is an unincorporated community in the middle of Nether Providence. Wallingford usually refers to the area in between Brookhaven Road, Route 252, Rosevalley Road and Avondale Road. The neighborhood of South Wallingford is also in Wallingford.

== Neighborhoods ==
=== Bowling Green ===
Bowling Green is a neighborhood of detached houses north of Baltimore Pike bordering Media Borough. Streets in Bowling Green are Mulberry Lane, Bent Road, Quaint Road, Twyckenham Road, Truepenny Road, Luckie Lane, Hidden Acres Lane and Surrey Road while west of Beatty Road.

=== Pine Ridge ===
Pine Ridge is a neighborhood of detached houses north of Baltimore Pike. Streets in Pine Ridge are Hemlock Road, Beechwood Road and Pine Ridge Road. Pine Ridge is zoned to go to Swarthmore-Rutledge School even though it is in Nether Providence Township.

=== Parkridge ===
Parkridge is a neighborhood of eighty detached houses just north of Pine Ridge and due east of Betty Road. It abuts Smedley Park to the east and the Media Quarry to the north. Streets in Park Ridge are Parkridge Road, Woodridge Lane, and Ridge Lane. Parkridge has held a yearly Independence Day neighborhood wide bbq and pot luck with games since the neighborhood was first developed in the mid 1950s. Like Pine Ridge, Parkridge is also officially zoned to go to the Swarthmore-Rudlege Elementary School, however the majority of residents send their kids to Wallingford Elementary School. Both schools are almost an equal distance from the neighborhood. It is a short walk to two trolley stations and the downtown of Media Borough.

=== Wesley Manor ===
Wesley Manor is a neighborhood of detached houses north of Baltimore Pike. Streets in Wesley Manor are Meredith Drive, Springlawn Drive, and Surrey Road while east of Beatty Road.

=== Sproul Estates ===
Sproul Estate is a neighborhood of detached houses north and west of Bullens Lane and bordered on the west by 320. It is named after William Cameron Sproul, where he resided.

== Notable people ==
- Horace Howard Furness
- William Henry Furness III
- Horace H. F. Jayne
- Thomas Leiper
- Albert Cook Myers
