= Thomas Leiper =

Scottish American businessman and banker (1745-1825)

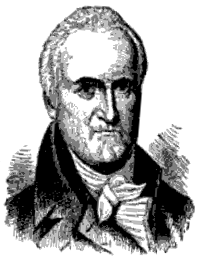
- Born: 15 December 1745; Strathaven, Scotland
- Died: 6 July 1825 (aged 79); Philadelphia, Pennsylvania, U.S.
- Resting place: Laurel Hill Cemetery, Philadelphia, Pennsylvania, U.S.
- Occupations: Tobacco exporter, mill owner, quarry owner, banker, politician
- Political party: Democratic
- Spouse: Elizabeth Gray (m. 1778)
- Children: 13, including George Gray Leiper

Thomas Leiper (15 December 1745 – 6 July 1825) was a Scottish American businessman, banker and politician who owned a successful tobacco exportation business as well as several mills and stone quarries. He served as a lieutenant in the Philadelphia City Troop during the American Revolutionary War. He built one of the first railways in America and the first in Pennsylvania. The Leiper Railroad was a three-quarter-mile long track on his property in Nether Providence Township, Pennsylvania, used to ship quarry stone to market with animal-powered carts.

Leiper rented a house in Philadelphia to Thomas Jefferson when he served as Secretary of State. They became close friends and a correspondence of over 100 letters between the two was exchanged.

He was a founder of the Bank of North America and served as a director for the Bank of Pennsylvania and the Second Bank of the United States. His grand house, named Strathaven Hall, was listed on the National Register of Historic Places in 1971.

== Early life and tobacco exportation ==
Leiper was born on 15 December 1745, in Strathaven, Lanark, Scotland. He was educated at schools in Glasgow and Edinburgh. He emigrated to Virginia in 1763 after his brother inherited the family estate and entered the tobacco trade. In 1765, Leiper moved to Philadelphia, Pennsylvania, and opened a tobacco shop. He purchased tobacco from his Virginia colleagues including Thomas Jefferson and James Madison, and exported it overseas. When the American Revolution began, the leading tobacco house in the community was legally prohibited from trading. Leiper seized the opportunity, expanded his business and became the principal tobacco agent in Philadelphia, then the capital of the United States.

== Military service ==
Leiper was a founder of the Philadelphia City Troop, a city-based light cavalry, and served with them as lieutenant during the Revolution at the battles of Princeton, Trenton, Brandywine, and Germantown. As treasurer of the troop, he carried the last subsidies of the French to the Americans at Yorktown. He also acted with his corps in quelling several civil insurrections and riots, notably in the Whiskey Rebellion of 1794, and in an attack on the residence of James Wilson in Philadelphia, when he was one of the seven troopers that charged and routed the mob of rioters.

== Mill and quarry ownership ==
In 1776, Leiper built a powder mill along Crum Creek in Nether Providence, Pennsylvania. He added a snuff mill to the property in 1779 and later added a blade mill and stone quarries. By 1825, Leiper had further expanded his operations to include a paper mill, an oyster crushing mill and a stone-cutting mill. His quarries provided stones for bridge and building construction. Granite from the Leiper quarry was cut for Philadelphia curbstones and door steps as well as in the construction of Girard College, Swarthmore College and the Chestnut Street Bridge in Philadelphia.

== Railway and canal construction ==
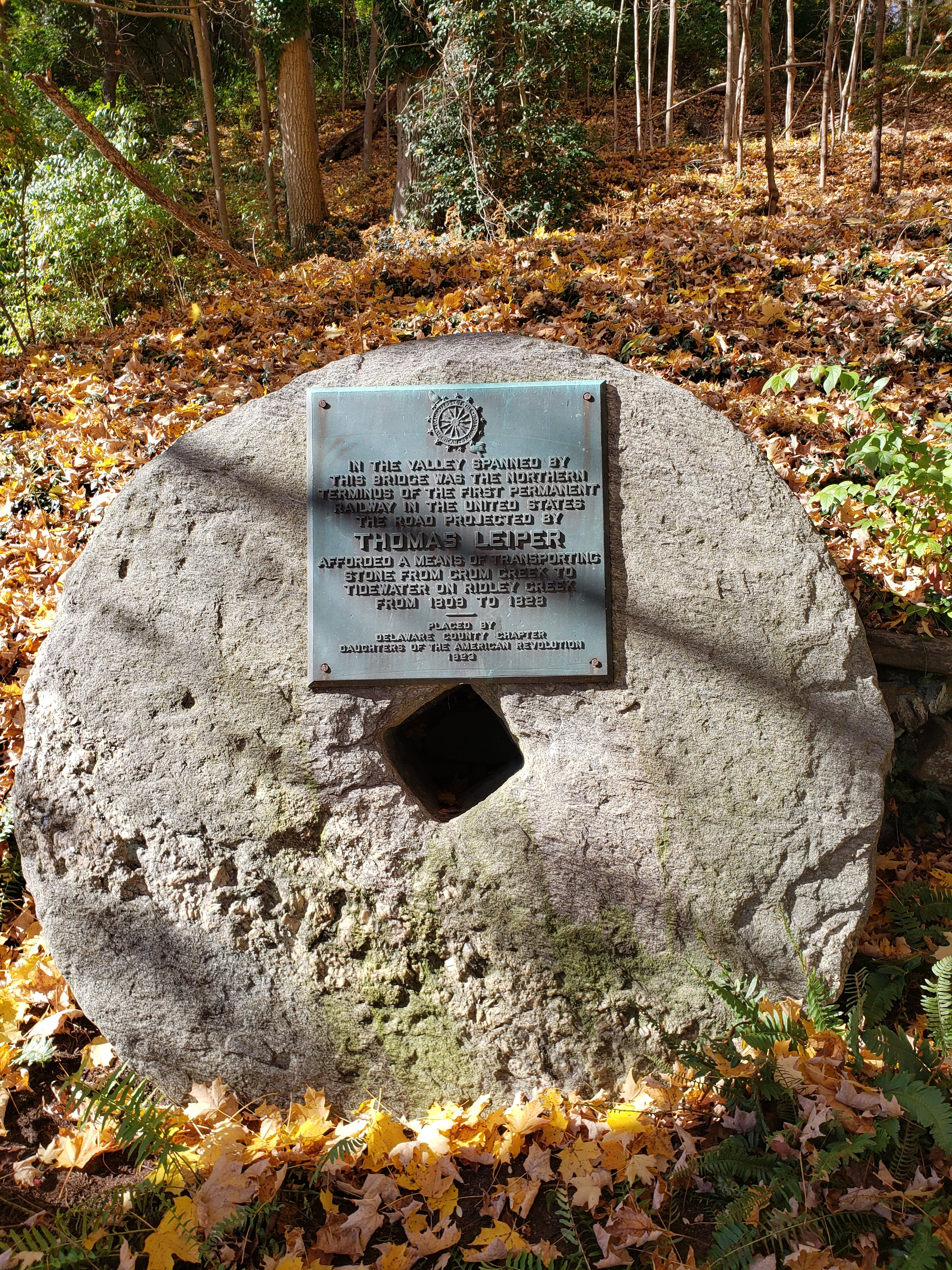
The plaque at Leiper's estate commemorating the first permanent railway in the United States was originally dedicated in 1923 by the Daughters of the American Revolution and placed on the Sproul Road bridge

Leiper struggled to get stone from his quarries to market since Crum Creek was not navigable and local roads could not handle wagons carrying heavy stone in all seasons. In 1790, Leiper and a fellow landowner, John Wall, petitioned the Pennsylvania legislature to allow the construction of a canal in order to ship stone from his quarry to the market. The legislature declined the construction and Leiper began to consider the construction of a railway similar to others that had been built in England.

Other railways had been built in North America prior to Leiper's. A gravity tramway was built by British soldiers in 1764 at the Niagara Portage in Lewiston, New York under the supervision of John Montresor. A temporary industrial railway was also built on Beacon Hill in Boston in 1795 and a replacement one in 1807 to transport gravel up the hill.

In 1809 Leiper constructed one of the first railways in America and the first in Pennsylvania. A 180 foot long stretch of wood rails laid on wooden ties spaced eight feet apart was created as an experiment in the Northern Liberties neighborhood of Philadelphia. The experiment was deemed a success when a single horse was able to haul a four-wheeled cart loaded with over 10,000 pounds of weight. The results of the experiment prompted Leiper to create a track three quarters of a mile long that extended from his quarries on Crum Creek to a landing on Ridley Creek. An ox, hitched to a cart filled with stone, walked between the rails slowly pulling the cart from the quarry to tidewater on Ridley Creek where the stream became navigable. There the cargo was loaded onto barges and ships for transportation to Philadelphia and other destinations along the Atlantic seaboard. The cars carrying stone used metal wheels. When the wooden rails of the railway wore out, they were replaced with stone.

The short railway was actively used until 1828, when it was superseded by a cargo capable canal, known as the Leiper Canal, also designed by Leiper before his death. In 1850, the canal was replaced by a spur of the B&O Railroad's Philadelphia-Baltimore line.

== Strathaven Hall ==
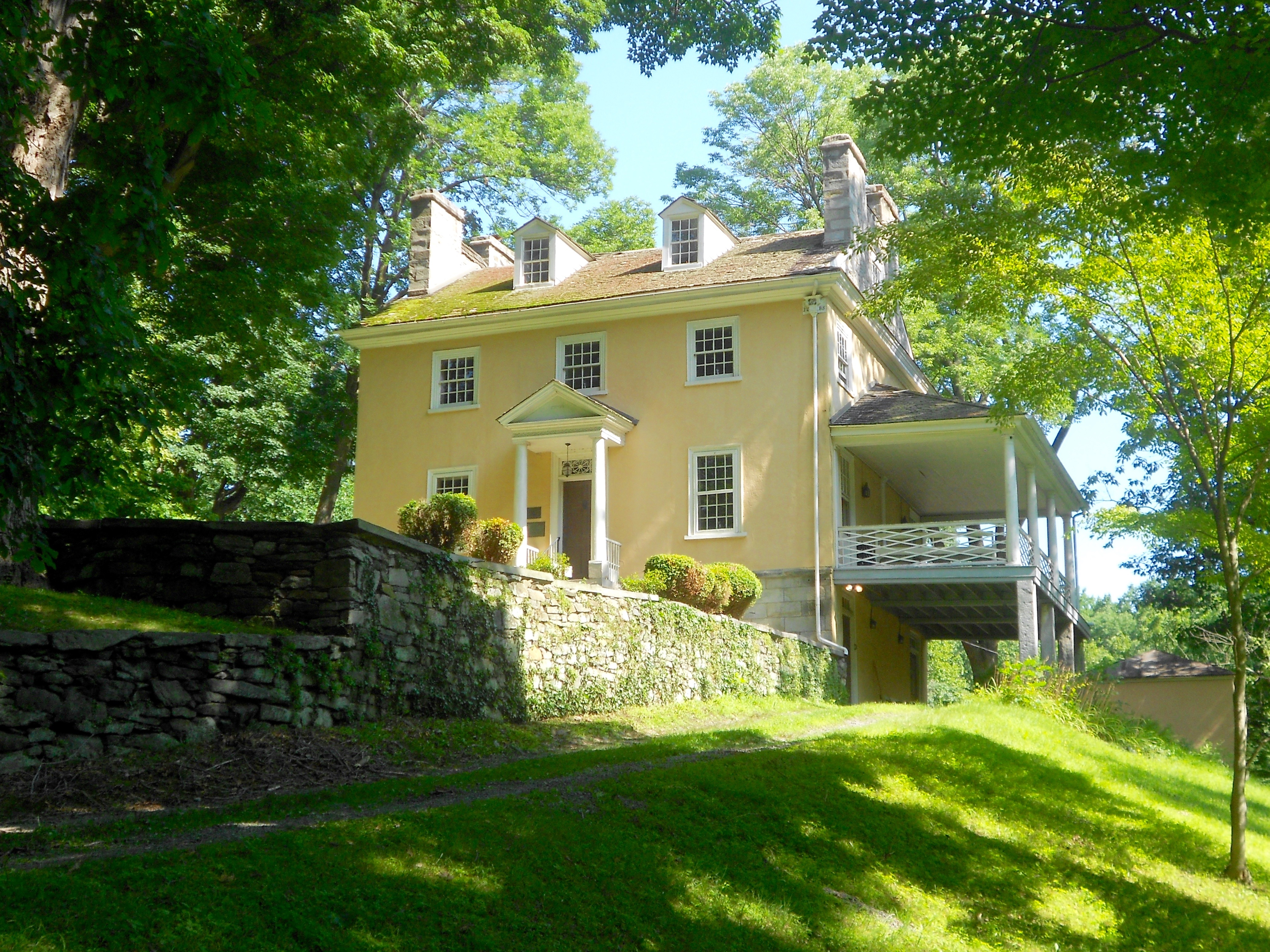
Leiper's estate Strathaven Hall built c. 1785 in Avondale, now Nether Providence Township, Pennsylvania

Leiper's enterprises generated a large fortune, which enabled him to build a grand estate on 414 acres in Nether Providence Township, known as Strathaven Hall after his place of birth. His property contained what may be the first private bank in America. He built a "safety" which was used to hold federal funds after the British invaded Washington, D.C. during the War of 1812. The building was also used to keep payroll for his mill operations and important papers. The house was occupied by his descendants until 1974 when it was sold to Nether Providence Township.

== Political career and banking ==
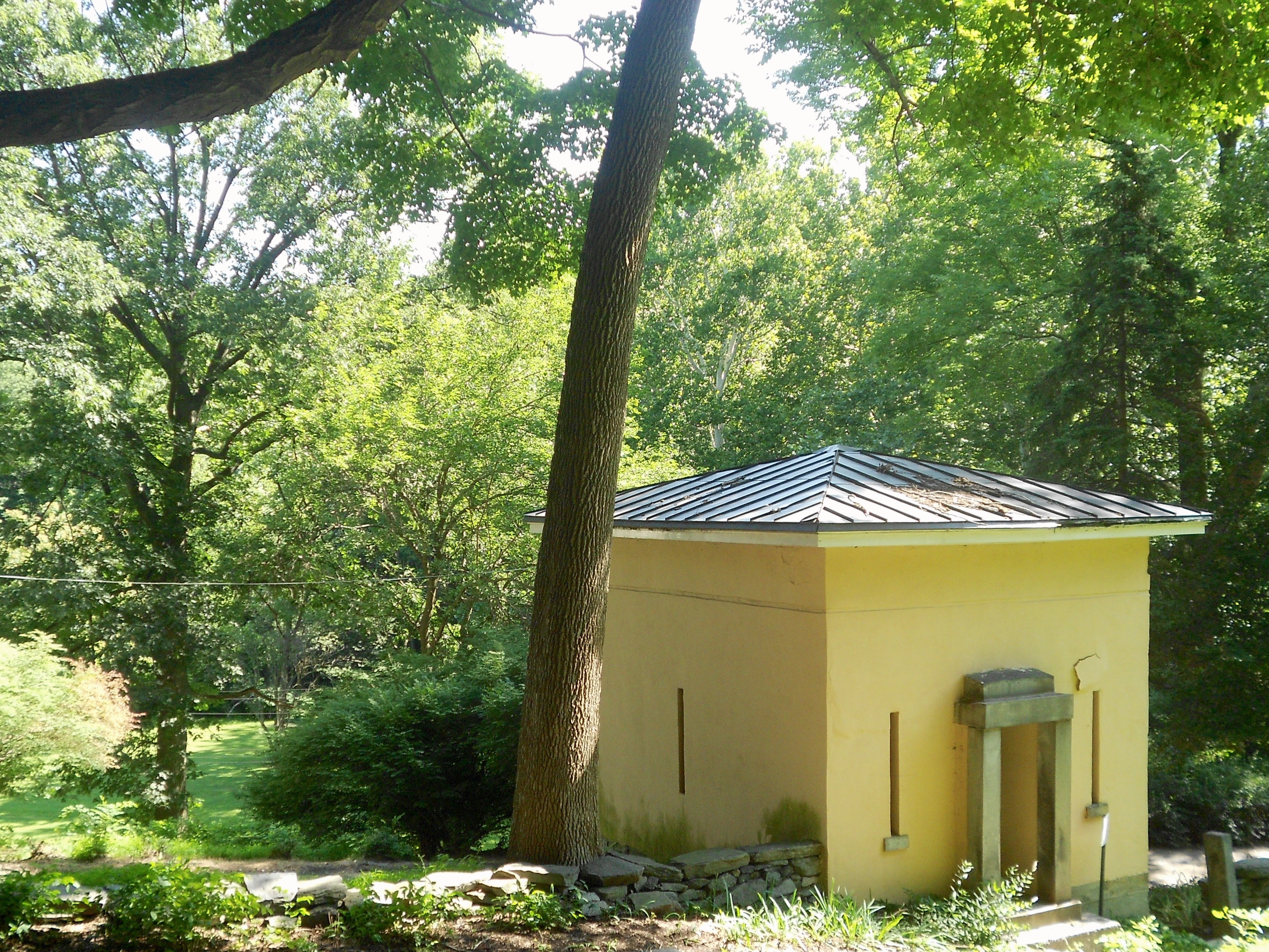
Leiper's "safety" on his estate may be the first private bank in America

Leiper was a staunch Democrat, and served actively as chairman of Democratic town meetings. Leiper, along with William Duane and Michael Leib, controlled the political environment in Philadelphia for many years. Leiper was the first to nominate General Andrew Jackson for the presidency and was a presidential elector for Jackson.

Together with Robert Morris, Leiper loaned one third of his estate to the Bank of North America which allowed it to fund the military efforts of George Washington at the Siege of Yorktown. He was a director of the Bank of Pennsylvania and the Second Bank of the United States. He served as a commissioner for the defense of the city in the War of 1812, and a member, and ultimately president, of the common council of the city of Philadelphia.

He was a founder and the first officer of the Franklin Institute in Philadelphia.

== Correspondence with Jefferson ==
In 1791, Leiper rented a large four-story house with stables in Philadelphia to Thomas Jefferson when he worked as Secretary of State. They became good friends and a correspondence of more than one hundred letters occurred between the two men. During the first few years of correspondence, the letters concerned the rental house, building construction and their tobacco business. Later letters discuss political issues, including the men's mutual distrust of England. The correspondence continued after Jefferson became President of the United States and ended in 1825 with Leiper's death.

== Death and legacy ==
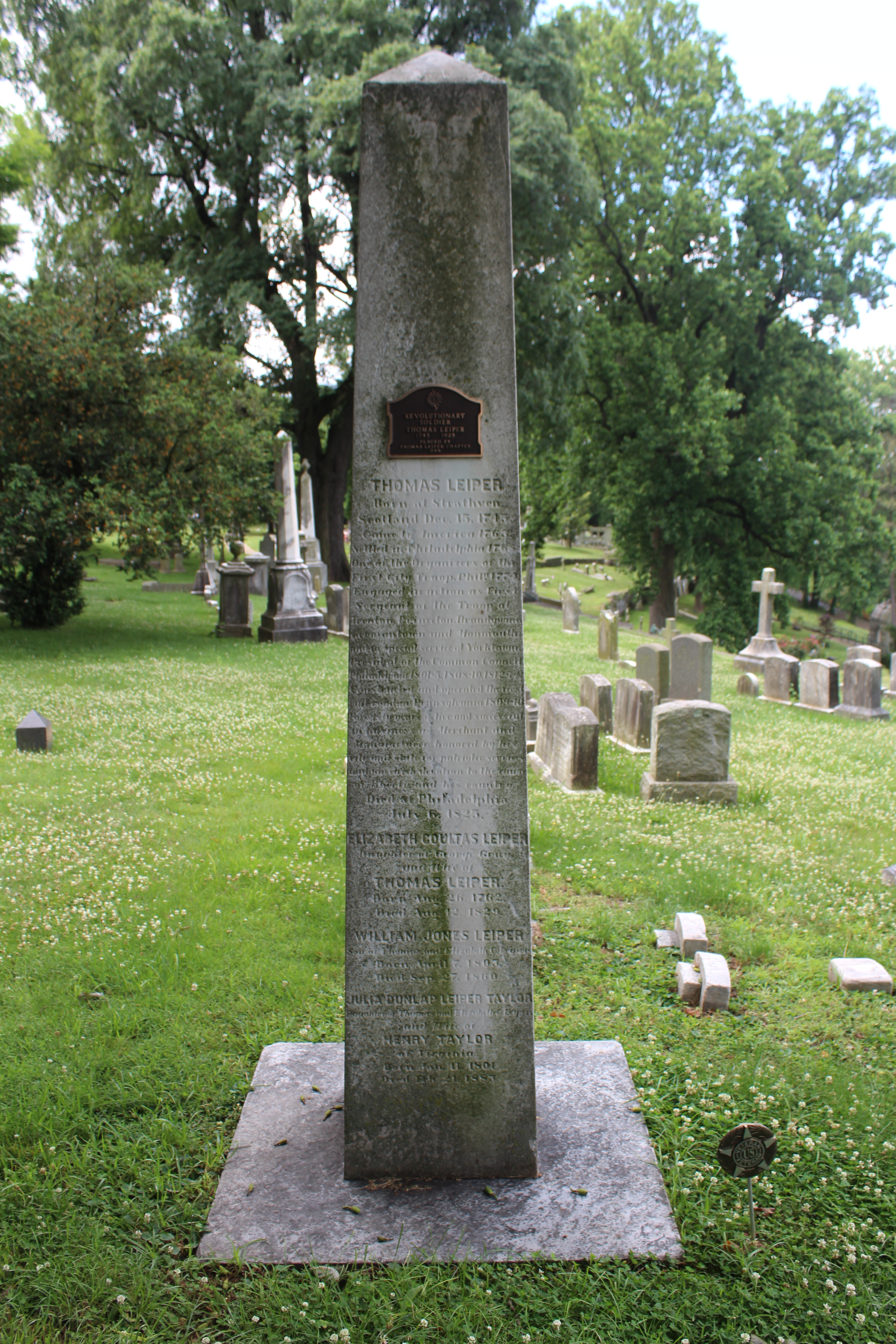
Thomas Leiper's gravestone in Laurel Hill Cemetery

Leiper died in Philadelphia, on 6 July 1825 and was interred in Laurel Hill Cemetery.

His estate, Strathaven Hall, was placed on the National Register of Historic Places in 1971.

== Family ==
In 1778, Leiper married Elizabeth Gray, whose father was George Gray, the Pennsylvania politician. Leiper was 32 and Elizabeth 16 when they married. They had 13 children; 10 lived to adulthood. His son, George Gray Leiper, born in 1786, represented Delaware county in Congress from 1829 until 1831 and served as an associate judge of the Delaware County circuit court. His daughter Jane Duval Leiper married John Kintzing Kane, a U.S. district judge; their children (Leiper's grandchildren) included naval officer, physician, and explorer Elisha Kent Kane and army General Thomas L. Kane.

== See also ==
- Oldest railroads in North America
