= Springton =

Springton may refer to:

- Springton, Prince Edward Island, Canada (specifically Queens County)
- Springton, South Australia
- Springton Lake, Pennsylvania, a lake in the United States
