= Leiper Railroad =

The Leiper Railroad was a 'family business–built' horse drawn railroad of 3/4 mile (1.2 km), constructed in 1810 after the quarry owner, Thomas Leiper, failed to obtain a charter with legal rights-of-way to instead build his desired canal along Crum Creek. The quarry man's 'make-do' railroad was the continent's first chartered railway, first operational non-temporary railway, first well-documented railroad, and first constructed railroad also meant to be permanent.

The credit of constructing the first permanent tramway in America may therefore be rightly given to Thomas Leiper. He was the owner of a fine quarry not far from Philadelphia, and was much concerned to find an easy mode of carrying stone to tide-water. That a railway would accomplish this end he seem to have had no doubt. To test the matter, and at the same time afford a public exhibition of the merits of tramways, he built a temporary track in the yard of the Bull's Head Tavern in Philadelphia. The tramway was some sixty feet long, had a grade of one inch and a half to the yard, and up it, to the amazement of the spectators, one horse used to draw a four-wheeled wagon loaded with a weight of ten thousand pounds. This was the summer of 1809. Before autumn laborers were at work building a railway from the quarry to the nearest landing, a distance of three quarters of a mile. In the spring of 1810 the road began to be used and continued in use during eighteen years.
by John Bach McMaster, page 494, A History of the People of the United States, from the Revolution to the Civil War

== Leiper ==
Map showing Crum Creek, Pennsylvania (2023 boundary of Philadelphia)

Thomas Leiper was a Pennsylvania Militia officer who served during several campaign years, first failing to obtain allowance to build a canal connecting his quarry near Crum Creek to Ridley Creek, reaching flood-waters on the estuary of the Delaware Valley tidewater in Delaware County, Pennsylvania.

First, he commissioned a short experimental horse-powered railway in 1809 which proved a horse-drawn heavy wagon heavily loaded could advance successfully against a stiff gradient a bit over 4%. The track, with a

gauge, had a grade of 1-1/2 inch to the yard (1 : 24 or about 4%) over its total length of 60 yards (54.9 m) and proves satisfactory when tested with a loaded car. The test track had created quite a scene, so it and the railway begun that year was both studied by nearby Penn students and professors, and was much covered in the press — when the permanent railroad began operations, it was on every-day operational display in the nation's largest, and most industrialized city.

It operated regularly as a private carrier between 1810 and 1828 in what is now Nether Providence Township, Delaware County, Pennsylvania. The railroad became the first 'meant to be permanent' and documented railway in North America, and first built by civilians. Ironically, when an 1824 petition finally succeeded, the railroad was replaced by the 'long desired canal' just as the world elsewhere was turning to and regularly were considering adopting railways for movement of heavy and bulk goods, as well as people. Then, in 1852, the railway was reopened and it replaced in turn, the Leiper Canal.

== Historical context ==
In the 1930s, a Harvard economics study observed that post Revolutionary War towns throughout the country experienced phenomenal growth rates, citing 133% per decade as a sustained average growth rate, that continued into the 1920s. This means, for every 1000 citizens, ten years later there were 2330.

From the start of the 1780s, most of the well known, or the individuals commonly thought of as our country's founding fathers, as well as many lesser known men of means and affairs had focused on transportation as being a problem. The 13 colonies had saturated the riverine valleys so far as they would support agrarian life-styles in vogue for the times, and industry was building only slowly but blocked by lack of fuels and worse, lack of means to transport it the tens or hundreds of miles it need come if a foundry or mill were to make use of it.

After the mid-1780s, the historical record shows repeated petitions to allow river improvements or charters for turnpikes and toll roads, so historians can correctly paint the era as either the canal age or the turnpike age. In 1793, the engineers of the Middlesex Canal, located a hydraulic cement and generally showed the way forward, and for the next several decades, canals to support commerce such as the Delaware and Hudson Canal, the Potomack Canal, the Raritan, the Morris, or the more famous Chesapeake and Ohio Canal, Chesapeake and Delaware Canal, Lehigh Canal, Schuylkill Canal and Erie Canal and Illinois Canals all cheapened long distance shipping dramatically, spurred commerce, and enabled the Industrial Revolution, including the production of enough iron to create railroads.

As the Leiper Canal was being constructed, a number of other railroad projects of far more ambitious scope were taking the field:

1. Pennsylvania's second charter was included in the Main Line of Public Works legislation, authorizing the Allegheny Portage Railroad which intended to crawl over the Alleghenies with barges on a railroad,
2. while in New Jersey, John Stevens built a test track in 1825 to experimentally settle the great traction debate and runs a steam locomotive around it in his summer home estate, Hoboken, New Jersey. In 1830, this would result in the Camden and Amboy Railroad incorporation and charter to connect New York harbor with Philadelphia-Trenton by fast railcar service, the first railroad to be 'focused first' on passenger traffic, with the competitive aim of taking on lucrative stagecoach services.
3. Pennsylvania's second private charter was given to the Delaware and Hudson Gravity Railroad (c.1826, o:1830),
4. whereas the Commonwealth of Massachusetts over chartered the Leiper Railroad's soulmate: the 3 miles (4.8 km) industrial animal powered Granite Railroad opened in Quincy, Massachusetts, to convey quarried granite for the Bunker Hill monument. It later becomes a common carrier railroad and lasted into the 20th century.
5. In the meantime, New York chartered the 16-mile route between Albany and Schenectady for the Mohawk and Hudson Railroad on April 17, 1826 (c.1826, o:1831), based on the idea it was better to travel an hour instead of a day circuitously on the canal around a waterfall.
6. and in 1827 the Lehigh Coal & Navigation Company built and began operating the 9 miles (14 km) Summit Hill and Mauch Chunk Railroad, while also in 1827, Maryland and Virginia clear needs and issue the charter and rights-of-ways for the ambitious Baltimore and Ohio — which becomes the (3rd or 4th) next operational railroad (depending upon how Liepers' withdrawal is counted and scored), running tests in 1829 about the time Leiper and Son are shifting from rail to canal and
7. The Stourbridge Lion, first steam locomotive imported into the USA, is tested along tracks built by the Delaware and Hudson company on August 8, 1829. Deemed too heavy for the company's rails, it and its three brethren are converted to stationary engines.
8. 1830 ushers in a flurry of transportation (railroad & canal) incorporations, charter applications, grants and beginnings of construction, and completions of construction and partial or full railway openings.
  1. The American built
  2. The B&O opens its first 13 miles (21 km) stretch to Ellicott's Mills and begins regular scheduled passenger services on schedule, May 24, 1830.
9. 1830 the 26 miles (42 km) Beaver Meadows Railroad from Beaver Meadows, Pennsylvania, is incorporated and construction commenced to open a second major coal field to the Lehigh Canal at a second loading facility in Parryville beyond the Lehigh Gap—this offered a more efficient use of the canal without jamming up the Summit Hill & Mauch Chunk. This would form the seed company of the first class Lehigh Valley Railroad after the 1870s.

Built two decades into the brief American canal age, it ran about 3 miles (5 km) along Crum Creek in Delaware County to its mouth in Eastern Pennsylvania's Delaware Valley. After rights to build the canal were initially denied, for 18 years a horse-drawn industrial railroad, the Leiper Railroad, was used to carry stone products from the quarry to the Delaware dock before the opening of the canal. One historian has opined that the idea was not Leiper's but belonged to TBDL and found, who became a noted engineer and steam locomotive builder.

The tramway became a shortline branch of the B&O railroad in the 1880s.

Crum Creek's mouth is located at 39°51′28″N 75°19′14″W.

Efforts were made in the 1930s to preserve the remnants of the railroad.

The Thomas Leiper Estate was added to the National Register of Historic Places in 1970. The Thomas Leiper House has been turned into a public museum in Wallingford.

== See also ==
- Oldest railroads in North America
- Leiper Canal
