= Thomas Leiper Estate =

Historic house in Pennsylvania, United States

- U.S. National Register of Historic Places
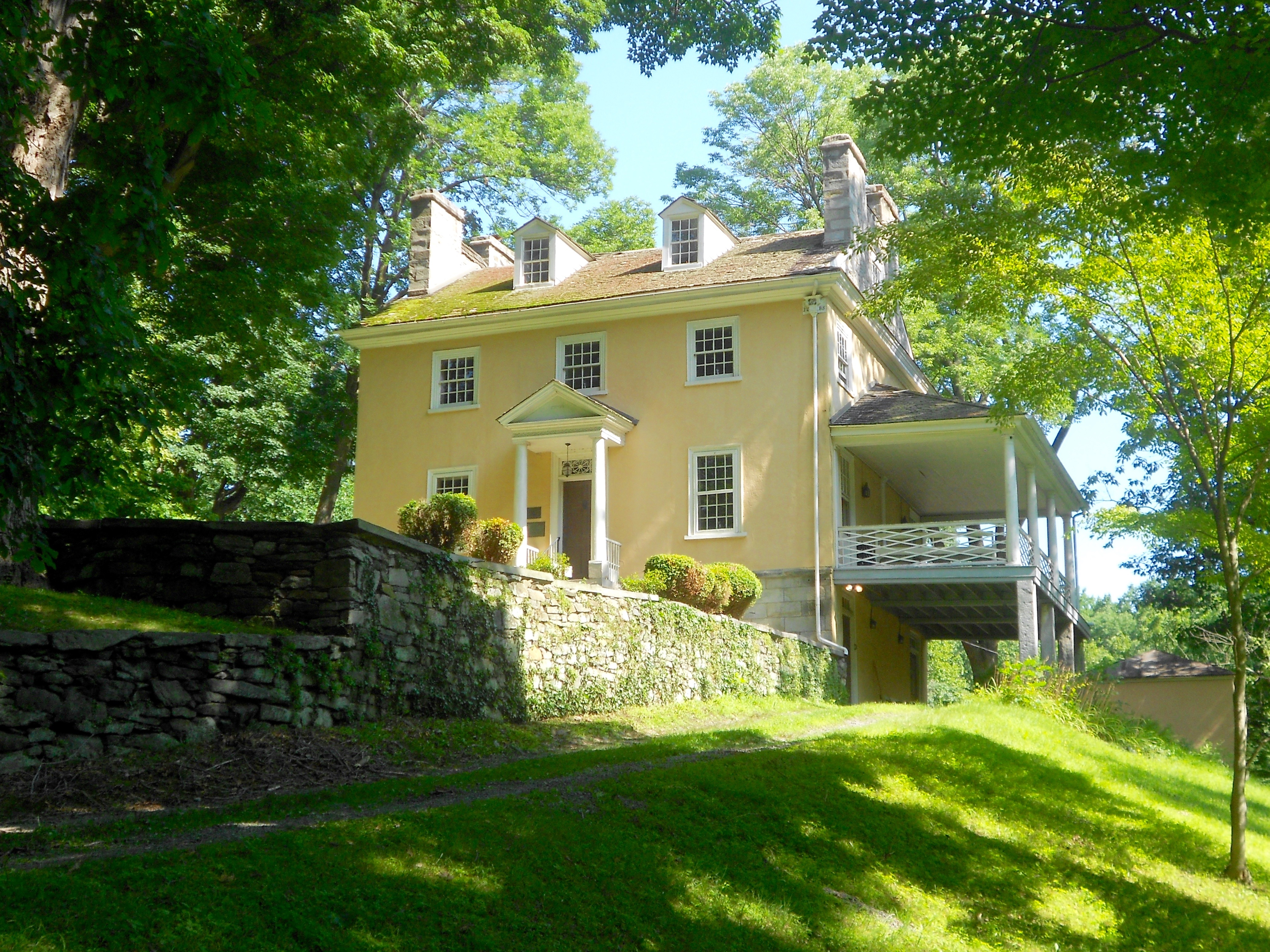
- "Avondale", Thomas Leiper House

- Location within Pennsylvania Location within the United States
- Location: Avondale Rd., Wallingford, Pennsylvania
- Coordinates: 39°53′12″N 75°21′30″W
- Area: 6 acres (2.4 ha)
- Built: 1785
- NRHP reference No.: 70000547
- Added to NRHP: December 29, 1970

The Thomas Leiper Estate, also known as Avondale, is an historic estate in Wallingford in Nether Providence Township, Delaware County, Pennsylvania, United States.

It was added to the National Register of Historic Places in 1971.

== History and architectural features ==
Built by Thomas Leiper circa 1785, this historic estate was named Strath Haven after Leiper's birthplace in Strathaven, Scotland, and includes a three-story, yellow-stuccoed mansion house, a "Fireproof" vault, a communal outhouse, a barn, a carriage house, a smokehouse, a warehouse, a tenant's house, and a quarry. Two local schools, Strath Haven High School and Strath Haven Middle School, are named for the estate.

The Friends of the Leiper House offers weekend guided tours of the house from April through December.

== Gallery ==
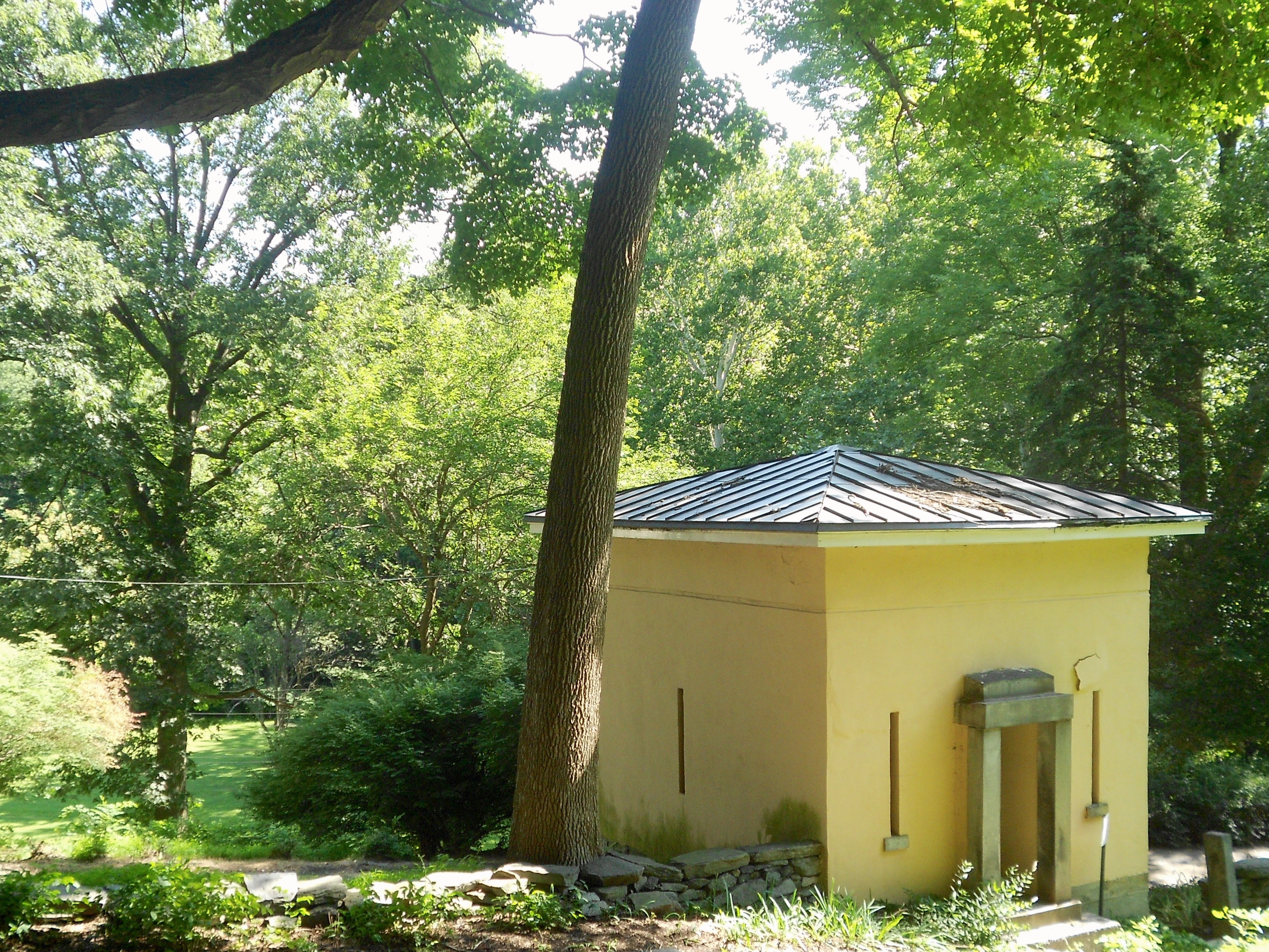
Fireproof vault

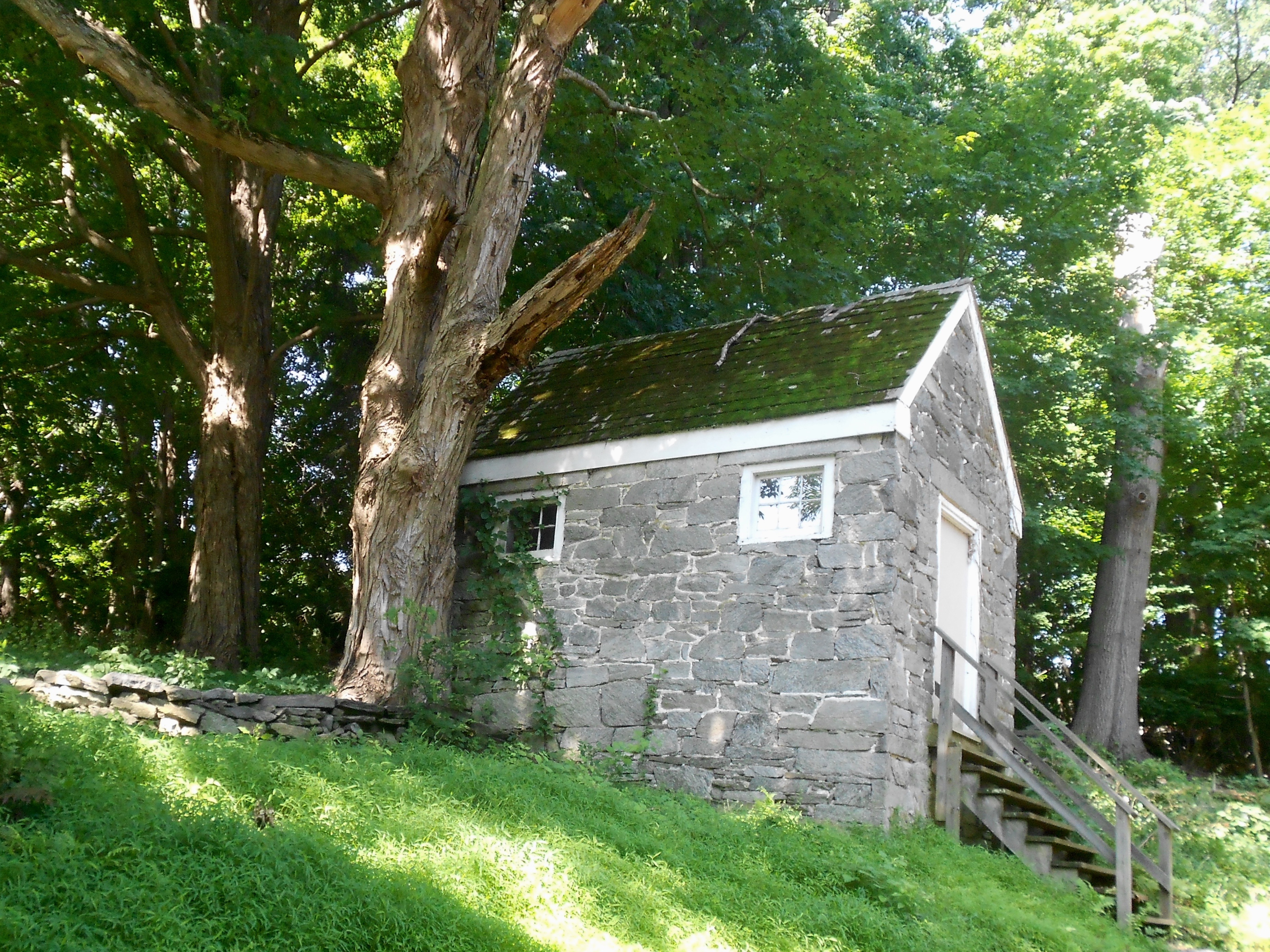
"Necessary", seats eight

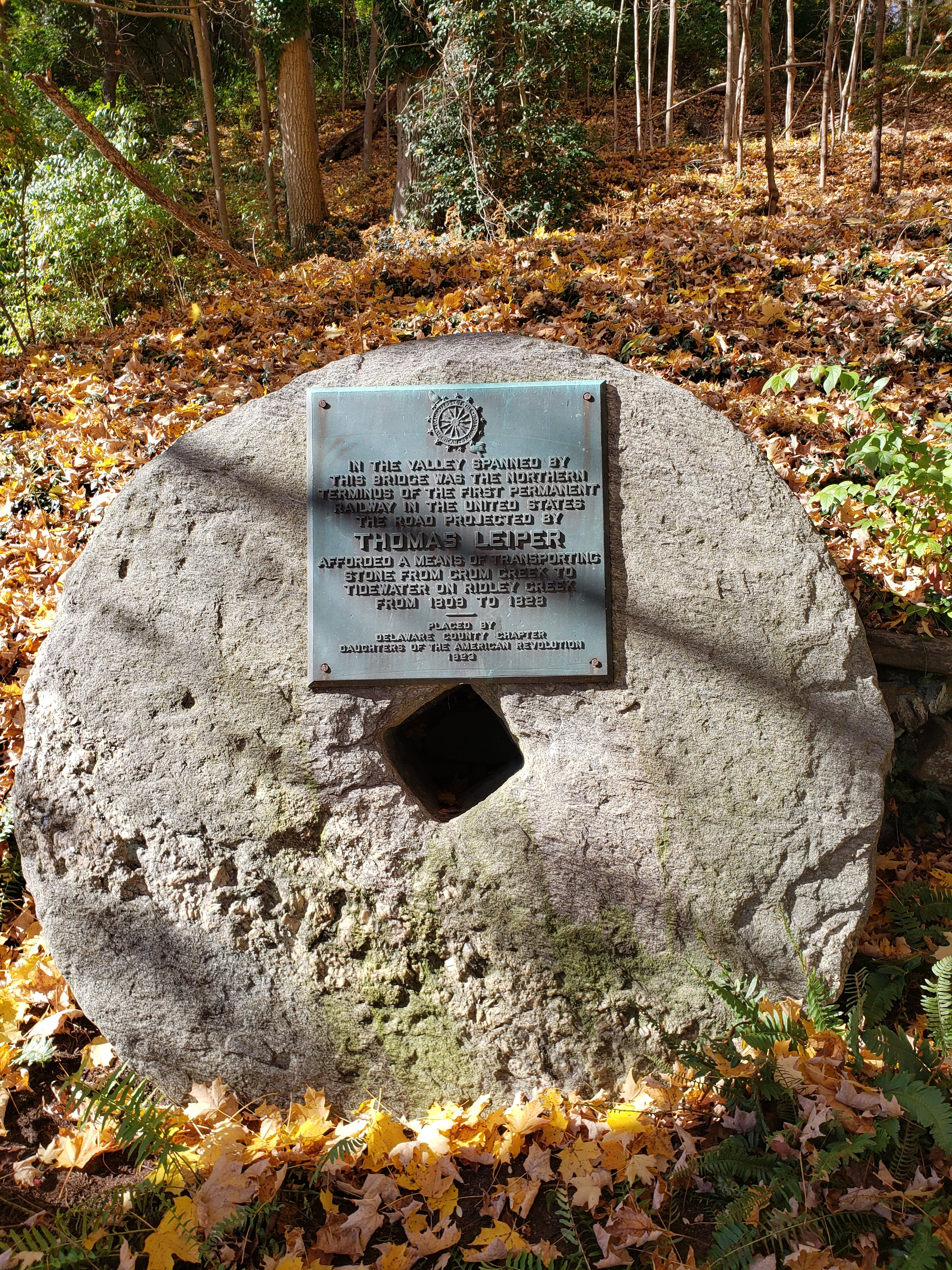
Commemorative Plaque at Thomas Leiper Estate

== See also ==
- Leiper Canal
- Leiper Railroad
- Strath Haven High School, school in Nether Providence, named after the estate
- List of Registered Historic Places in Delaware County, Pennsylvania
