= Providence, North Carolina =

Providence may refer to the following places in North Carolina:

- Providence, Caswell County, North Carolina
- Providence, Granville County, North Carolina
- Providence, McDowell County, North Carolina
- Providence, Mecklenburg County, North Carolina
- Providence, Rockingham County, North Carolina
- Providence Township, Rowan County, North Carolina
