= Wolley Stille =

Historic house in Pennsylvania, United States

- U.S. National Register of Historic Places
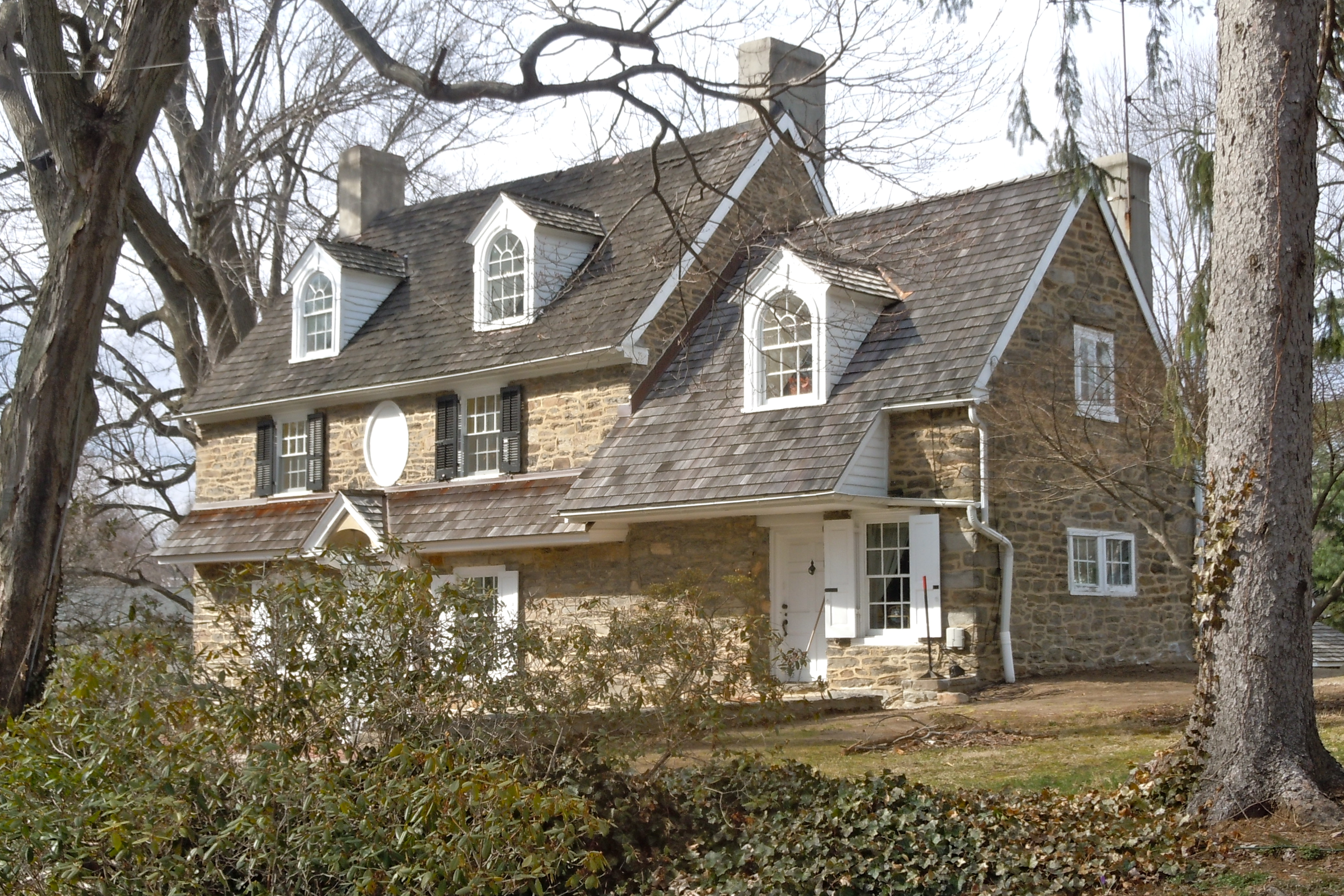
- Wolley Stille, March 2011

- Location within Pennsylvania Location within the United States
- Location: Harvey Rd., Wallingford, Pennsylvania
- Coordinates: 39°52′28″N 75°21′58″W
- Area: 1 acre (0.40 ha)
- Built: 1692-1700, 1751, 1916
- Built by: Sharpless, Joseph
- Architect: Robb, Donald
- Architectural style: Colonial Revival, Other, Swedish & English Colonial
- NRHP reference No.: 80003487
- Added to NRHP: June 27, 1980

Wolley Stille, also known as the Joseph Sharpless House, is an historic home that is located in Wallingford, Delaware County, Pennsylvania, United States.

It was added to the National Register of Historic Places in 1980.

== History and architectural features ==
This historic structure is a fieldstone dwelling that consists of a two-story, pre-1700 building, with a Great Hall that dates to 1700, a two-story addition that was built in 1751, and a service wing that was added in 1916.

The house exhibits both Swedish and English Colonial elements of design and construction and was restored between 1915 and 1916 by architect Donald Robb, who also added some Colonial Revival elements, including enlarged dormer windows.

== Gallery ==
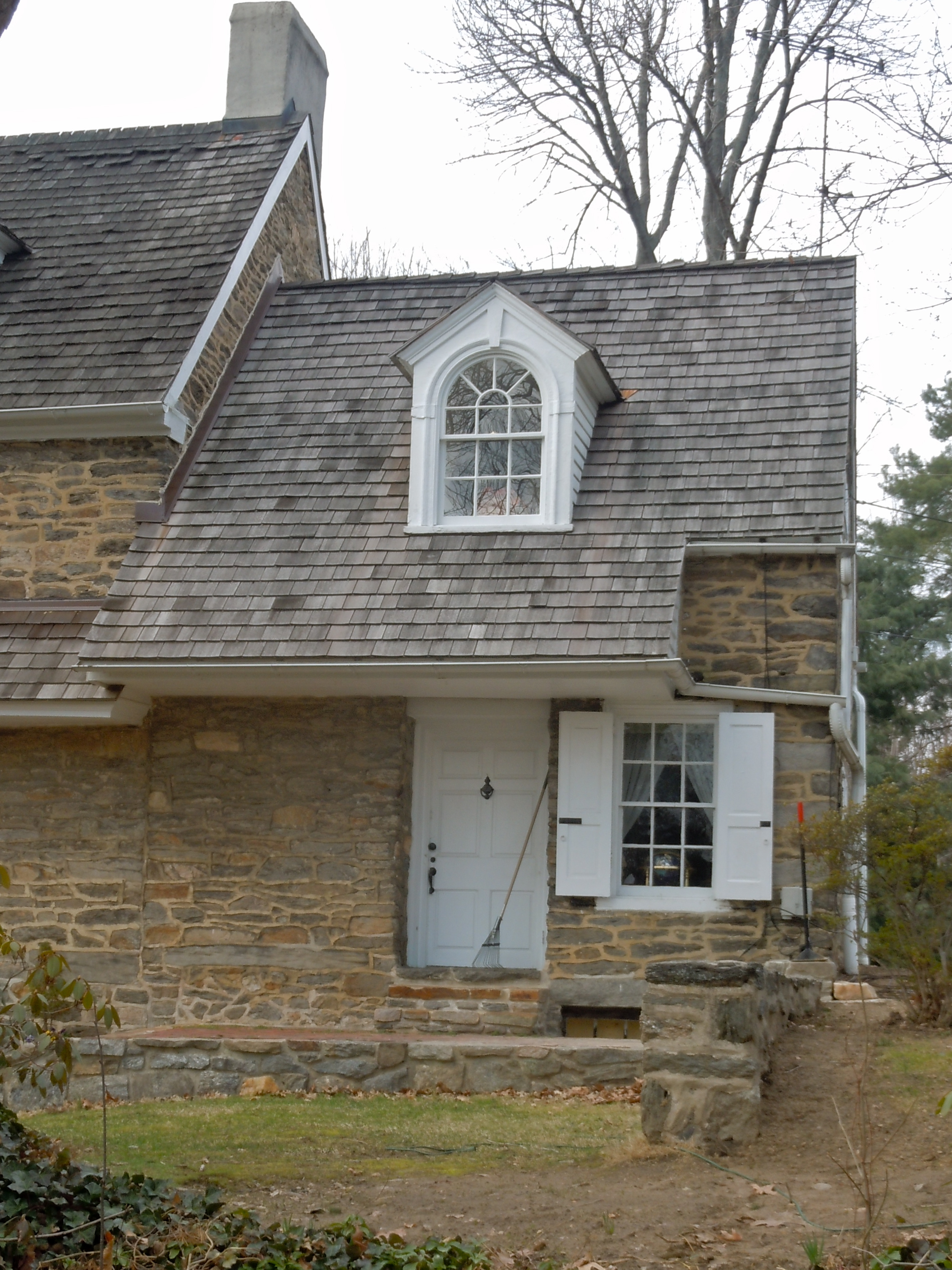
Oldest part of the house

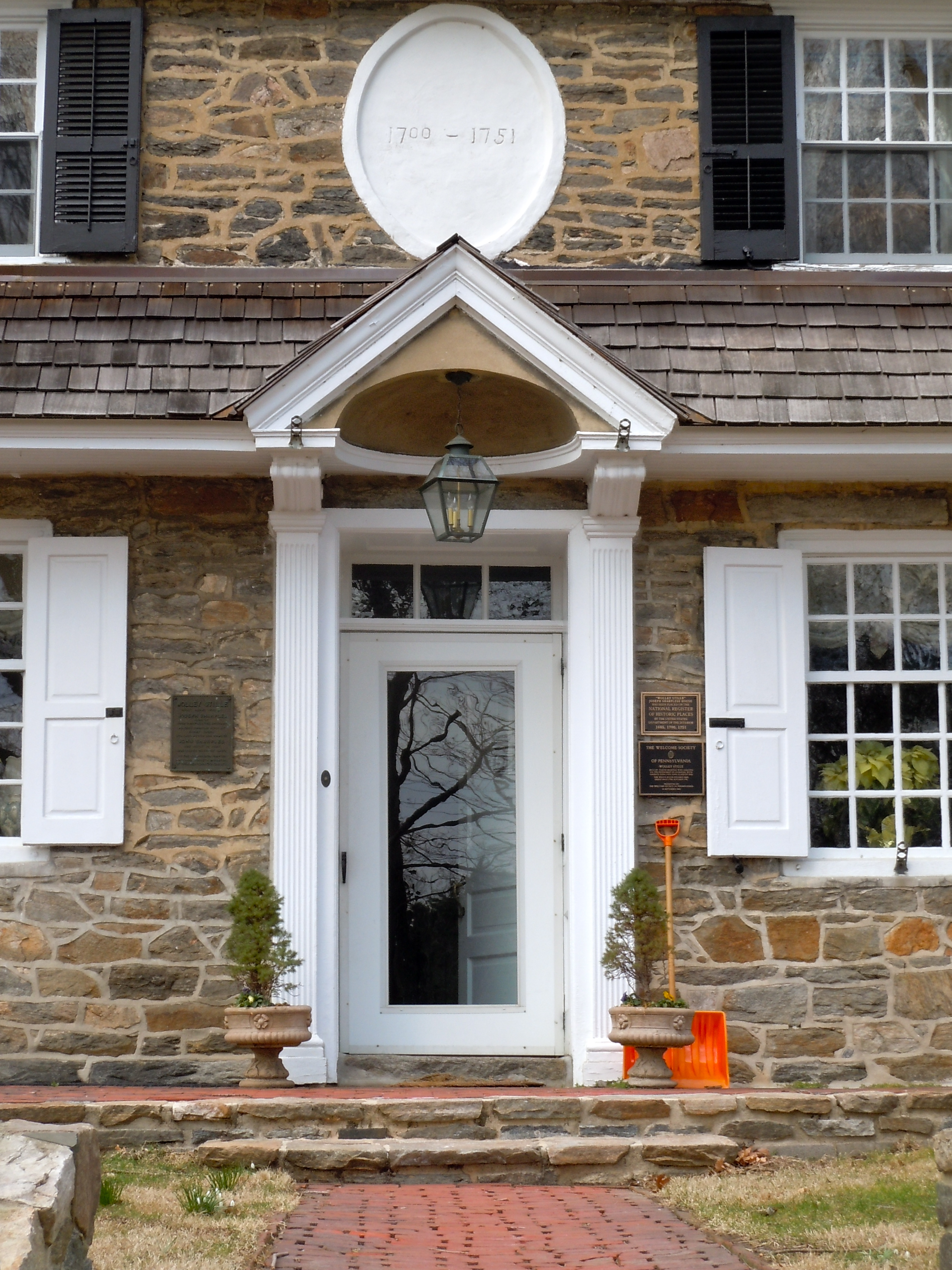
Door, c. 1751
