= Westlawn (Wallingford, Pennsylvania) =

Historic house in Pennsylvania, United States

- U.S. National Register of Historic Places
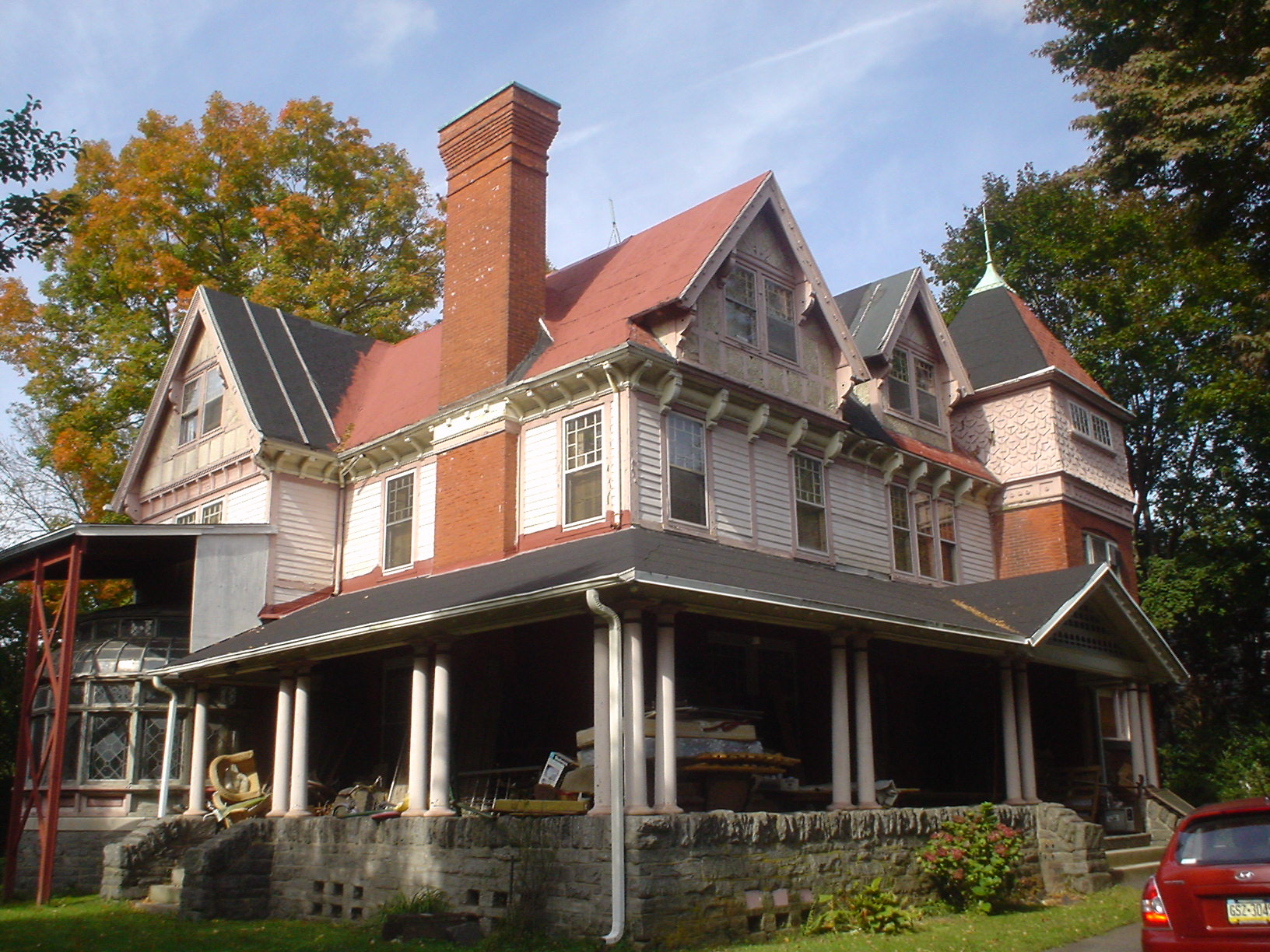
- "Westlawn," October 2009

- Location within Pennsylvania Location within the United States
- Location: 123 N. Providence Rd., Wallingford, Pennsylvania
- Coordinates: 39°54′23″N 75°22′37″W
- Built: 1882
- Architectural style: Stick-Eastlake, Queen Anne
- NRHP reference No.: 88002188
- Added to NRHP: November 18, 1988

"Westlawn", also known as the Charles Essig House, is an historic home that is located in Wallingford, Delaware County, Pennsylvania, United States.

It was listed on the National Register of Historic Places in 1988.

== History and architectural features ==
Built in 1882, this historic structure is a 2 1/2-story, asymmetrical dwelling with a cross gable roof and faceted pentagon addition. Designed in the Queen Anne style, it has a variety of exterior treatments, including brick, clapboard, novelty shingles, half-timber beams, and stucco. It also features gable dormers, a turret, a square tower, wraparound porch, and three corbelled chimneys. The house was built for Charles Essig, organizer and first dean of the School of Dentistry, University of Pennsylvania.

== Gallery ==
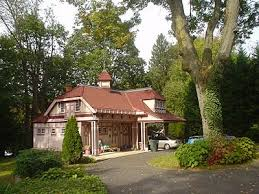
The Carriage House at Westlawn
