= Springton Reservoir =

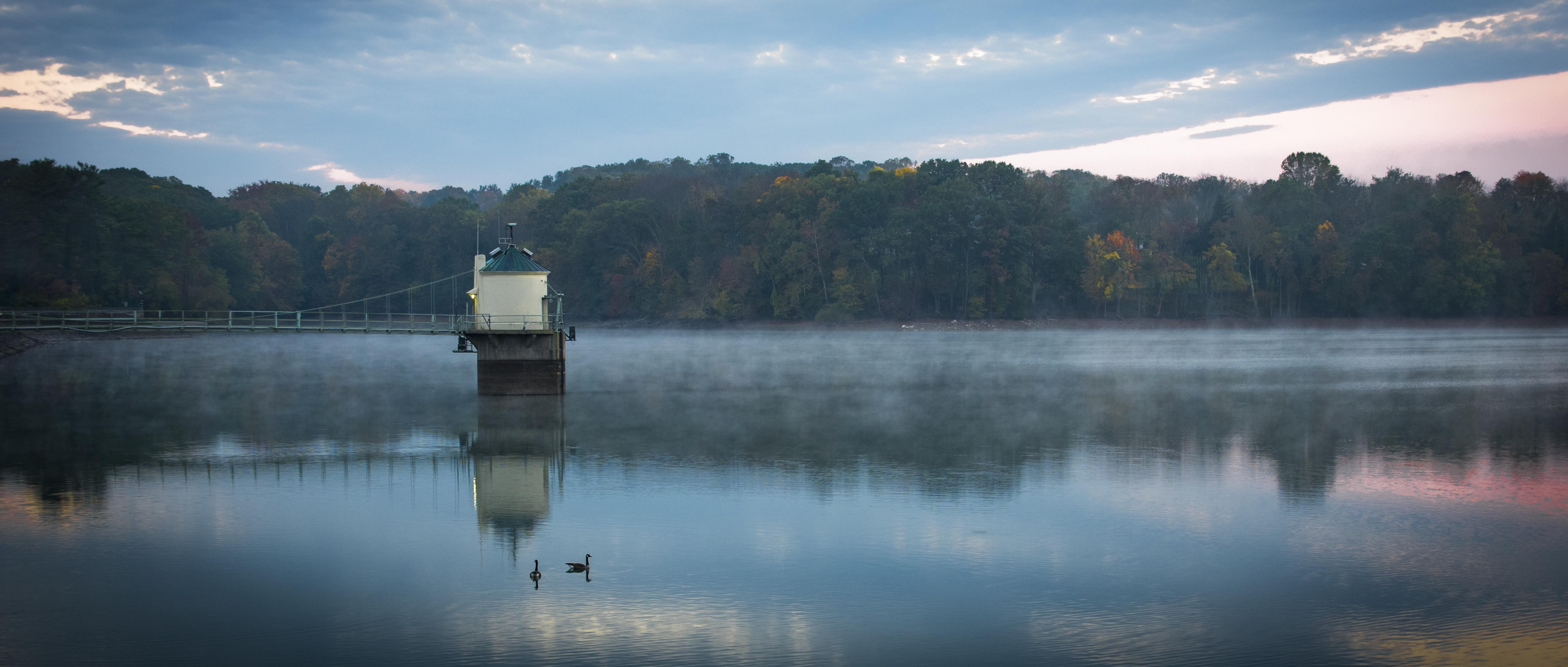
- The reservoir in 2014

- Location within Pennsylvania Location within the United States
- Location: Delaware County, Pennsylvania
- Coordinates: 39.956°N 75.405°W
- Type: reservoir

The Springton Reservoir (also known as Springton Lake or the Geist Reservoir) is a reservoir that is located in Delaware County in the Commonwealth of Pennsylvania in the United States.

== History and notable features ==
Created in 1931 when Crum Creek was dammed near Pennsylvania Route 252, it is an approximately 391-acre (1.58 km^{2}) drinking-water reservoir maintained by Essential Utilities. It is located within Newtown Township, Marple Township, and Upper Providence Township.

Until the last two decades, the reservoir was open to fishing via an entrance on Gradyville Road in Newtown Township. There is still a wide array of aquatic life in the reservoir, which includes largemouth and smallmouth bass, crappie, various pan fish, trout, and catfish. There is also a bald eagle that nests on the Upper Providence side of the reservoir.

The reservoir is patrolled by Aqua America security during day hours.
