= Providence Township, Chester County, Pennsylvania =

Coordinates: 39°55′N 75°22′W

Providence Township was a township in what was then part of Chester County, Pennsylvania. In 1687, it was split into Upper Providence and Nether Providence Townships. Both Townships were in the area that split off of Chester County to form Delaware County in 1789.
