= Leiper Canal =

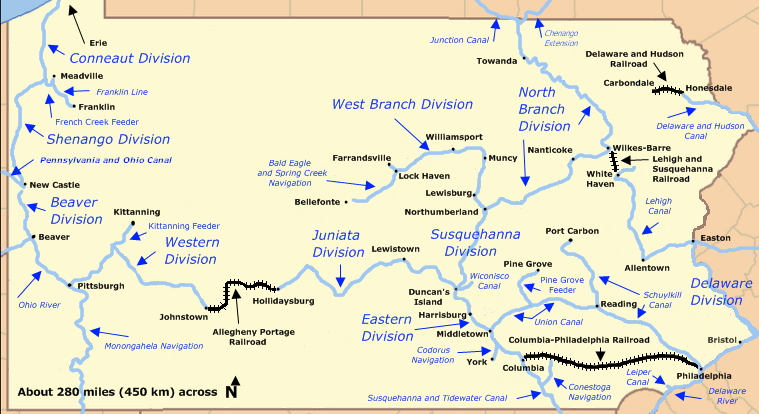
- Map of historic Pennsylvania canals and connecting railroads

Specifications
- Locks: 3
- Status: Historic, abandoned

History
- Original owner: George Leiper
- Date completed: 1829
- Date closed: 1852

Geography
- Start point: Leiper stone quarry near Springfield
- End point: Delaware River at Eddystone
- Connects to: Delaware River

Early in the 19th century, the Leiper Canal built in 1828–29 during the middle of the American canal age ran about 3 miles (5 km) along Crum Creek in Delaware County to its mouth in eastern Pennsylvania's Delaware Valley carrying its owner‘s quarried products to docks on the Delaware River tidewater until 1852.

== Early days ==
Previously, a horse-drawn tramway, the Leiper Railroad, carried stone from the quarry for 18 years before the opening of the canal. The tramway was built by Leiper's father, Thomas Leiper, whose request to build a canal in 1791 was denied by the Pennsylvania Legislature. However, the Legislature of 1824 were of a different mind, and were unbiased by reports of failed attempts to improve the Schuylkill River (a series of failures, back to 1764) as they were debating parts of the Main Line of Public Works omnibus transportation package of bills, and the project, once ranked a crackpot idea, was in 1824 simply stylish.

== Changing times ==
As it had evinced enthusiasms for toll roads connecting the far off frontier settlements to the east, or to better connect parts of the old east itself, between 1790 and 1820, as the 1820s progressed, the whole nation had entered a period of frenzied canal building spurred on by the successful effects of the commerce on the Lehigh Canal and Schuylkill Canals; along with the ongoing construction of the Union Canal, Chesapeake and Delaware Canal locally expected within a few years, and New York's pending completion of the Erie Canal (first section now open) even while the various Delaware and Hudson Canal projects were in the news. In light of the big projects contemplated to link Philadelphia by canal with Pittsburgh and Erie, Pennsylvania and Lake Erie, the Pennsylvania general court speedily approved a second canal proposal by Thomas Leiper, and the construction project was carried out by his son.

The Leiper Canal was one of several privately funded canals such as the Lehigh Canal, Union Canal and the Schuylkill Canals that operated in Pennsylvania during the same boom era as when the Pennsylvania Canal System was constructed. In 1852, the families railway was reopened and the canal and locks were eventually filled in. Completed in 1828 to haul stone in flat-bottomed boats from his quarry near Springfield Township, Delaware County, Pennsylvania, to the navigable Delaware River at Eddystone, industrialist George Leiper financed the canal based on a dream of his father, using it when completed to replace the animal powered Leiper Railroad between 1829 and 1852.

== Configuration ==
Crum Creek's mouth is located at 39°51′28″N 75°19′14″W.—and perhaps uniquely ironic in history, was in turn replaced by the same railroad in 1852 when it was refurbished and reopened with new superior and now mature railroad technology.

The system, which had three locks, replaced an industrial railway built in 1810 by the elder Leiper when he failed to obtain a right-of-way charter for any canal; operated by his family, the horse-drawn industrial railroad carried the families stone goods until the canal, which could carry heavier loads, received legislative blessings and was completed in 1828.

== Recognition ==
The Thomas Leiper Estate was added to the National Register of Historic Places in 1970. The Thomas Leiper House has been turned into a public museum in the well-to-do neighborhood of Wallingford.

== See also ==
- List of canals in the United States
