= Providence Township, Bedford County, Pennsylvania =

Coordinates: 40°00′N 78°18′W

Providence Township was a township in Bedford County, Pennsylvania. The township was formed in 1780. In 1854 the township split into East Providence and West Providence Townships.
