= Providence Township, Buena Vista County, Iowa =

Township in Iowa, US

Providence Township, Buena Vista County
- Township
- Coordinates: 42°36′08″N 095°05′43″W
- Country: United States
- State: Iowa
- County: Buena Vista

Area
  - Total: 35.86 sq mi (92.87 km^{2})
  - Land: 35.85 sq mi (92.86 km^{2})
  - Water: 0.0077 sq mi (0.02 km^{2})
- Elevation: 1,316 ft (401 m)

Population (2000)
  - Total: 316
  - Density: 8.8/sq mi (3.4/km^{2})
- FIPS code: 19-93513
- GNIS feature ID: 0468579

Providence Township is one of sixteen townships in Buena Vista County, Iowa, USA. As of the 2000 census, its population was 316.

== Geography ==
Providence Township covers an area of 35.86 square miles (92.9 km^{2}) and contains no incorporated settlements.
