= Providence Township, Hardin County, Iowa =

Township in Hardin County, Iowa, U.S.

Coordinates: 42.2522°N 93.1747°W

Providence Township is a township in Hardin County, Iowa, United States.

== History ==
=== Settlement and Early Pioneers ===
Providence Township was organized in 1856.

The first settlement in Providence Township began in September 1851, when Levi Reece, William Dobbins, E. I. Reece, and John J. Thornton arrived and quickly began building cabins. James L. Tulbert, William Hobson, and Samuel Dillon claimed land later in the fall. In the spring of 1852, Joseph Dillon and James Fitzgerald had joined, constructing log homes and breaking the untouched prairie soil. These pioneers displayed remarkable courage and resilience, enduring the challenges of a remote wilderness devoid of markets or mills.

In 1853, William Reece settled after claiming his land in 1851. David and Thomas Bennett followed in 1854, though tragedy struck when Thomas’s son and David were killed by lightning while working the prairie. Other settlers that year included John Allen Hayworth, J. A. Allgood, and William Flemming. Among the notable arrivals, John S. Bond, originally from Indiana, moved to Providence Township in 1854, while E. Andrews, born in Virginia, settled in 1855.

Additional settlers included James Lund, T. D. Hinshaw, Marcus Blair, W. H. Cook, J. B. McCormick, Asher Kersey, William F. Andrews, Jonathan S. Hockett, P. C. Hadley, Jeremiah S. Hadley, Joseph W. Mitchell, Seneca Wildman, William Wildman, and Daniel H. Martin. Many of these early settlers were members of the Society of Friends (Quakers), shaping the township's values and character.

=== Key Milestones ===
- First Settlement: 1851
- First Birth: Sarah B., daughter of John J. and Julia Thornton, in autumn 1851.
- First Death: William Dobbins, on September 6, 1852.
- First Marriage: James Dillon and the widow of Patrick Fitzgerald.
- First Church: A Society of Friends meetinghouse, erected in 1854.
- First School: Taught by James Tulbert in a newly constructed building, also in 1854.
- First Mills
  - Steam Mill: Reuben Bond built the first steam mill in 1854.
  - Water Mill: L. Lawrence’s water mill, later known as Hadley’s Mill, also served the community. By 1880 it had disappeared save its old flume and a bit of the dam.

=== Temperance Movement ===
Providence Township's residents, particularly the Friends, were known for their temperance. During Iowa’s 1882 vote on a constitutional amendment for prohibition, only two of 250 township votes supported saloons—a record of steadfast abstinence. The township has never hosted a saloon.
