= Providence Township, Rowan County, North Carolina =

Township in Rowan County, North Carolina

Coordinates: 35.6360499°N 80.3435908°W

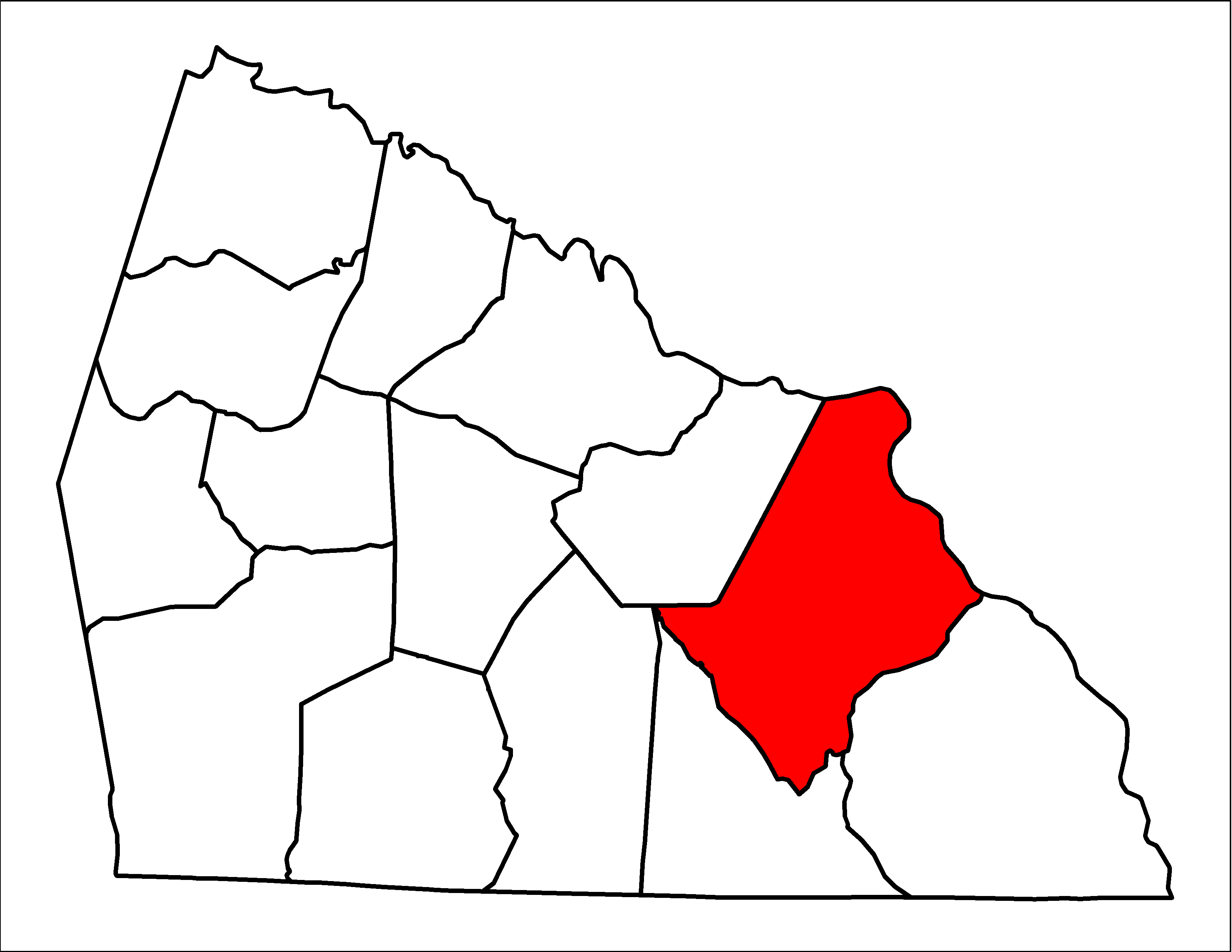
Location of Providence Township in Rowan County, N.C.

Providence Township is one of fourteen townships in Rowan County, North Carolina, United States. The township had a population of 8,892 according to the 2000 census.

Geographically, Providence Township occupies 54.41 square miles (140.9 km^{2}) in southeastern Rowan County. The only incorporated municipality in Providence Township is a large portion of the town Granite Quarry. The township's northern and eastern boundary is with the Yadkin River and the township contains a portion of High Rock Lake.
