= Crum Creek =

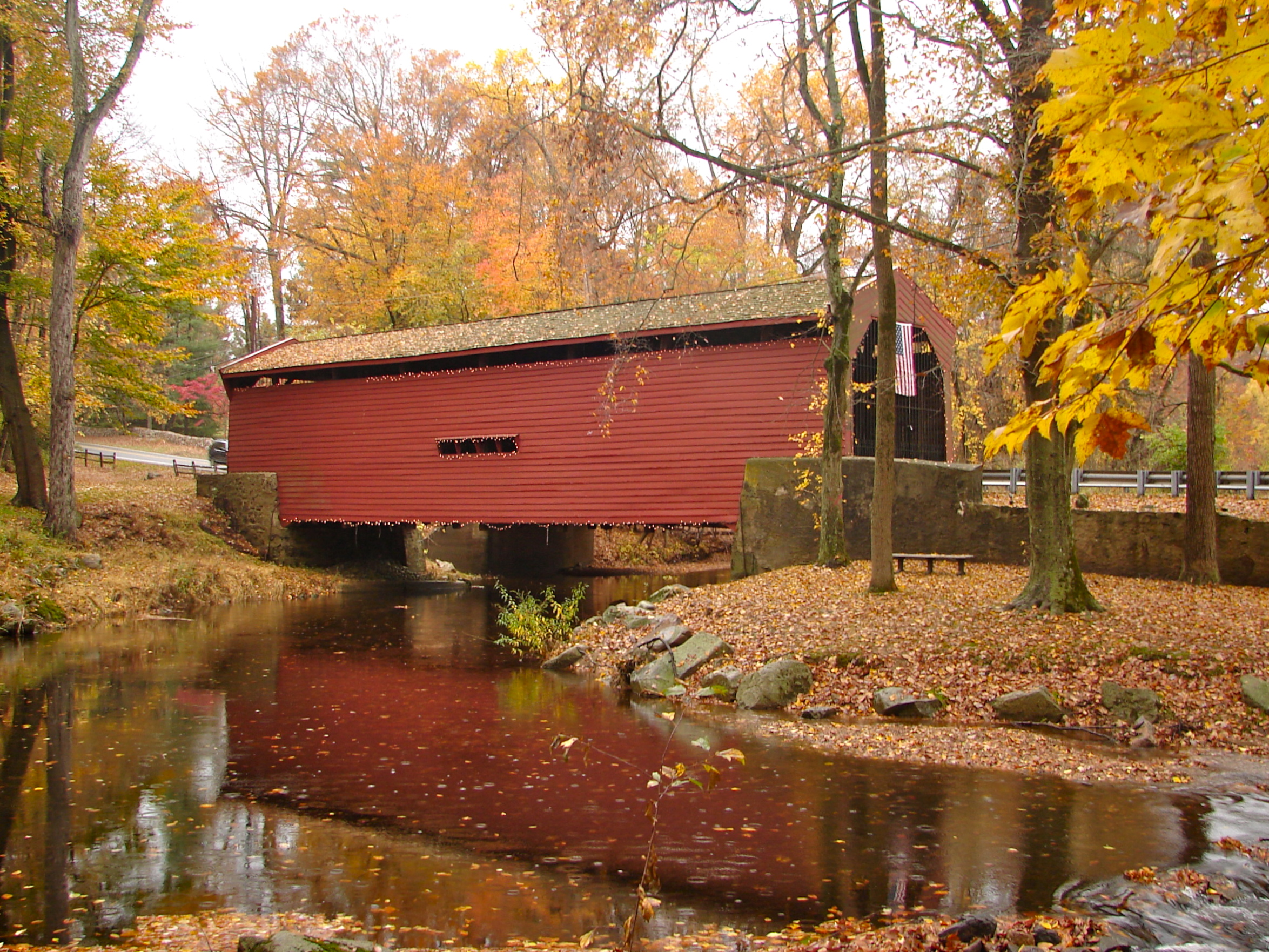
- Bartram's Covered Bridge across Crum Creek

Location
- Country: United States
- State: Pennsylvania
- Cities: Newtown Square, PA, Eddystone, PA

Physical characteristics
- Source
  - location: Chester County, Pennsylvania
  - coordinates: 40°02′15″N 75°28′34″W
- Mouth: Delaware River
  - location: Eddystone, Delaware County, Pennsylvania, USA
  - coordinates: 39°51′29″N 75°19′16″W
- Length: 24 mi (39 km)

Crum Creek (from the Dutch, meaning "crooked creek") is a creek in Delaware County and Chester County, Pennsylvania, flowing approximately 24 miles (39 km), generally in a southward direction and draining into the Delaware River in Eddystone, Pennsylvania. It begins in a swamp (formerly a lake, dammed out) near Newtown Square, Pennsylvania along which several mills were established in the 19th century. Right afterward it crosses under Pennsylvania Route 29 and winds one and a half miles (2.4 km) downstream until it hits the hamlet of Crum Creek. It later flows into the Delaware River near Philadelphia.

Two notable landmarks along the creek's course are high trestles: a trolley trestle about 30 feet (10 m) high runs across the creek in Smedley Park, in Nether Providence Township; this trestle carries the Southeastern Pennsylvania Transportation Authority's 101 trolley line from Media, Pennsylvania across the creek. About a mile (1.6 km) south, a 1,000-foot-long (300 m), 100-foot-high (30 m) trestle carries SEPTA's Media/Wawa Line commuter railroad line across the creek, which by now runs through a deep valley. The trestle is located in the Crum Woods, 200 acres (81 ha) of forest surrounding the creek that constitutes part of the campus of Swarthmore College. This tract, one of the largest patches of woodland remaining in Delaware County, is managed by the college's Scott Arboretum. The trestle is half in Nether Providence Township (west of the creek) and half in Swarthmore borough (east of the creek).

Baltimore Pike also crosses the Crum by Smedley Park in Nether Providence Township. A stone bridge carrying the highway was erected in 1924 with a 70-foot-tall (21 m) arch commemorating the 282 men and 2 women from Delaware County who died in World War I. This arch was demolished in 1958 when the highway was widened. The memorial tablets were moved to the nearby entrance of Smedley Park.

Crum Creek was dammed in 1931 near Pennsylvania Route 252 to fill Springton Lake (also known as Geist Reservoir), an approximately 391-acre (1.58 km^{2}) drinking water reservoir maintained by Aqua America.

== Dams ==
Crum Creek has five dams. The first is in Upper Providence Township, thus backing up the creek to create Springton Reservoir. The second is in Nether Providence Township at the Aqua PA facility, it creates a small, unnamed reservoir. The third is just north of Wallingford Road (Rogers Lane) partly in Springfield Township and partly in Nether Providence Township. The fourth is under the SEPTA Media/Wawa bridge partly in Swarthmore and partly in Nether Providence. The fifth is just north of East Rose Valley Road (Yale Avenue) partly in Swarthmore and partly in Nether Providence.

== See also ==
- List of rivers of Pennsylvania
- Chester Creek
- Ridley Creek
