= Swarthmore High School =

Coordinates: 39.904848°N 75.346749°W

- Swarthmore, PA; United States

Information
- Type: Public secondary
- Established: 1893
- Closed: 1983
- Locale: Wallingford-Swarthmore School District
- Grades: 9-12
- Colors: Garnet, White

Swarthmore High School was a four-year public high school in Swarthmore, Pennsylvania serving the Boroughs of Swarthmore and Rutledge.

== History ==
Swarthmore established its independent school district when Swarthmore Borough was incorporated in 1893.

Families in Springfield Township could choose to send their children to Swarthmore High, Lansdowne High School, and/or Media High School prior to the 1931 establishment of Springfield High School.

The Swarthmore and Rutledge School Districts merged in 1955. In 1971 the Swarthmore-Rutledge District merged with adjacent Nether Providence School District to create the Wallingford-Swarthmore School District.

After Pennsylvania state officials determined that Swarthmore was too small for its own secondary schools, Swarthmore High School merged with Nether Providence High School in Wallingford to form Strath Haven High School in the fall of 1983. The merged school was and still is based at the former Nether Providence campus.

The building that was Swarthmore High School is now the Swarthmore-Rutledge School, an elementary school in the Wallingford-Swarthmore School District.

== Notable alumni ==
- Edmund N. Bacon (1928), city planner (and father of actor Kevin Bacon)
- Ron Bloom (1973), Presidential advisor in the Obama administration
- Wally Butterworth (1918?), radio personality
- Carl Gersbach (1964), NFL player, 1970–1976
- Terry Irving (1969), CNN producer
- Edmund Jones (1935), Pennsylvania State Representative
- Bevan Sharpless (1922), planetary astronomer
- Kim Maslin-Kammerdeiner (1983), goaltender, 1991 FIFA Women's World Cup champion soccer team
- Jan Westcott (1930), author
