= Nether Providence High School =

Coordinates: 39.894637°N 75.371747°W

- Wallingford, PA; United States

Information
- Type: Public secondary
- Established: 1924
- Locale: Wallingford-Swarthmore School District
- Grades: 9th – 12th
- Colors: Blue & Gold
- Mascot: Bulldogs

Nether Providence High School was a four-year public high school in Wallingford, Pennsylvania, United States, serving Nether Providence Township and the boroughs of Rose Valley and Moylan. The school merged with Swarthmore High School in 1983 to form Strath Haven High School, based at the second Nether Providence campus. Nether Providence High School was a part of the Wallingford-Swarthmore School District.

Nether Providence High School was founded as a small, rural high school in 1924. However, population grew throughout the 1950s and 1960s, leading to additions in 1952 and 1963. The building was shared with Nether Providence Junior High School. In 1970, a new building was built right across the street. That building is currently home to the Strath Haven High School. After the 1983 SHS-NPHS merger, forming SHHS, the stone building became home to the Nether Providence Junior High School. In 1991, the building became home to the Strath Haven Middle School, housing 6th-8th grade students in the township, Rose Valley, Rutledge and Swarthmore.

The 1970 building was renovated and expanded during the 1999-2000 school year, and from 2007-2010, the stone building underwent a series of renovations and additions. For the 2010-11 school year, the 1924 and 1963 buildings were demolished, the 1952 building was fully renovated, and a new addition was added housing classrooms.

== Notable alumni ==
- Allen Alley, Oregon politician and businessman
- Ingrid Croce (née Jacobson), singer, author, restaurateur and widow to singer Jim Croce
- J. Gordon Holt, writer and publisher
- Marsha Ivins, astronaut and engineer
- Bill Purcell, politician and former major of Nashville TN
