= Steve Simeone =

American stand-up comedian

Steve Simeone is an American stand-up comedian who regularly performs in Hollywood at The Comedy Store. Between 2014 and 2020, Simeone hosted a weekly podcast "Good Times with Steve Simeone". He has toured with Andrew Dice Clay, Pauly Shore, Steve Rannazzisi and Gabriel Iglesias, and has appeared on Comedy Central.

== Early life and education ==
Simeone was born and grew up in Wallingford, Pennsylvania, a suburb of Philadelphia, the middle of three children and is of Italian descent. He attended Strath Haven High School and went to Loyola University Maryland in Baltimore, Maryland, graduating in 1995.

== Career ==
Simeone was employed by the Philadelphia Eagles between 1997 and 2000 as an office worker. After leaving that job, he began performing stand-up comedy in Philadelphia and won the Philadelphia's Funniest Person competition. He moved to Los Angeles and worked at The Comedy Store, parking cars and providing front door security. He later was given the opportunity to perform on stage and became a regular paid performer there.

Simeone performed for the U.S. troops overseas, including tours of Iraq and Afghanistan. He also co-hosts, with Josh Macuga, the weekly Guilty Movie Pleasures on the Schmoes Know Network. In 2011 Simeone co-hosted The Rod Pod pro wrestling podcast with WWE hall of famer Rowdy Roddy Piper.

In October 2014, Simeone made his Comedy Central debut as part of Gabriel Iglesias Presents Stand Up Revolution. He also performed once again at The Comedy Store in La Jolla. That year Simeone performed a number of 60-second comedy routines for Honda's online Summer Cheerance Sale.

In 2016 Simeone performed at Brea Improv as part of a show to raise funds for Operation Underground Railroad. Also in 2014 Simeone released a comedy album, Remember This. The album is a collection of humorous stories from his past shows.

In 2026 Simeone appeared on an episode of Ari Shaffir's storytelling series, The End.
