= Lamar Campbell (American football) =

American football player (born 1976)

Seattle Seahawks
- Positions: Strategic Personnel Development & Football Operations

Personal information
- Born: August 29, 1976 (age 50); Chester, Pennsylvania, U.S.
- Listed height: 5 ft 11 in (1.80 m)
- Listed weight: 182 lb (83 kg)

Career information
- High school: Strath Haven (Wallingford, Pennsylvania)
- College: Wisconsin
- NFL draft: 1998: undrafted

Career history
- Detroit Lions (1998–2005); Indiana Firebirds (2004)

Career NFL statistics
- Tackles: 137
- Sacks: 1.0
- Interceptions: 1
- Stats at Pro Football Reference

Lamar Christopher Campbell (born August 29, 1976), nicknamed "Soup", is an American former professional football player who was a cornerback for five seasons for the Detroit Lions of the National Football League (NFL). He played college football for the Wisconsin Badgers. After his playing career, he served as the Vice President of Player Engagement of the Chicago Bears from 2015 to 2022. Campbell currently serves as Strategic Personnel Development & Football Operations for the Seattle Seahawks.

== Biography ==
Campbell was born and grew up in Chester, Pennsylvania. He attended the University of Wisconsin–Madison from 1994 to 1998 and, with a degree in history, he left the university and signed as a free agent with the NFL's Detroit Lions. He played with the Lions from 1998 to 2005.

After the NFL, he went on to intern in the Detroit Lions Scouting Department. During this period, Campbell became involved with player development and realized the opportunities available to advance his career after his professional football days were over. After becoming a licensed real estate broker in Atlanta, Campbell enrolled in the Wharton School of Business Real Estate Program and the Sports Business Initiative Program offered by NFL Player Development and studied real estate development and planning. In 2007, Campbell opened his own real estate company in Atlanta, The Success of Real Estate LLC.

In January 2022, Campbell was involved with a committee of Bears staffers to select the new general manager and head coach, which ultimately led to the hiring of Ryan Poles and Matt Eberflus, respectively. Ironically, on July 1, 2022, Campbell was fired by the Bears.
