= Eddie Murphy Raw =

1987 film by Robert Townsend

- Theatrical release poster
- Directed by: Robert Townsend
- Written by: Eddie Murphy; Opening sketch: Eddie Murphy; Keenen Ivory Wayans
- Produced by: Robert D. Wachs; Keenen Ivory Wayans
- Starring: Eddie Murphy
- Cinematography: Ernest Dickerson
- Edited by: Lisa Day
- Production company: Eddie Murphy Productions
- Distributed by: Paramount Pictures
- Release dates: November 25, 1987 (United Kingdom); December 18, 1987 (United States)
- Running time: 90 minutes
- Country: United States
- Language: English
- Budget: $8 million
- Box office: $50.5 million($143 million in 2025 dollars)

Eddie Murphy Raw is a 1987 American stand-up comedy film starring Eddie Murphy and directed by Robert Townsend. It was Murphy's second feature stand-up comedy film, following Eddie Murphy Delirious. However, unlike Delirious, Raw received a wide theatrical release. The 90-minute show was filmed at the Felt Forum, a venue in the Madison Square Garden complex in New York City. The film was released in the United States on December 18, 1987. As of December 2024, it is the highest-grossing stand-up comedy concert film ever released, making $50.5 million in the United States and Canada.

== Plot ==
The film opens with a pre-taped sketch depicting a scene from Murphy's childhood. At a family Thanksgiving in November 1968, the children take turns showing their talents to the assembled relatives (including one played by Murphy himself). Young Eddie (Deon Richmond) shocks the family with a rude joke about a monkey and a lion. While the rest of the adults are shocked, his aunt and uncle are delighted and the uncle (Samuel L. Jackson) proclaims, "I love that doo-doo line. That boy's got talent!"

After emerging on stage for the live show, Murphy begins by discussing the angry reactions of celebrities parodied in his previous stand-up show, Delirious, specifically Mr. T and Michael Jackson, as well as homosexual viewers offended by his jokes about "faggots." Murphy then narrates a phone call he received from Bill Cosby chastising him for using profanity on stage. Angered by Cosby's assumption that his entire act was nothing but "filth flarn filth," Murphy calls Richard Pryor for advice. Pryor declares that his only concerns should be making audiences laugh and getting paid, and recommends that he tell Cosby to "Have a Coke and a smile and shut the fuck up." Murphy elaborates on his admiration for the "raw" comedy of Pryor, running through a routine from his own teenage years about defecation, in Pryor's voice. He then goes on to talk about how people who don't speak English only pick up the curse words in his act, and shout them at him on the street.

Next comes a lengthy routine about dating and relationships. Murphy explains that the rise of deadly sexually transmitted infections has motivated him to seek marriage, but the divorce of Johnny Carson and Joanna Holland (in which she sought 50% of his assets) has left him paranoid about the financial risk of marriage, concluding that "no pussy is worth $150 million." He mocks the aggression and materialism of American women (compared to his belief in the meekness of Japanese women), referring to the popularity of Janet Jackson's song "What Have You Done for Me Lately." He jokes that he intends to go deep into Africa to find a "bush bitch" who has no concept of Western culture... at least until American women convince her to stand up for herself and demand "HALF!" This develops into a broader warning to men to avoid "the pussy trap," and a warning to women that men never remain faithful — once a man has evoked a powerful orgasm from a woman ("ooohhhh!") she will tolerate all kinds of misbehavior, although she may pursue infidelity of her own.

The next segment narrates a childhood memory of his mother promising to cook him a hamburger "better than McDonald's," only to produce an unappealing "big, welfare, green-pepper burger," a lump of beef filled with onion and green peppers on Wonder Bread (while the neighborhood children show off their McDonald's hamburgers in a call-back to the ice cream segment of Delirious), but he states that as an adult, he has more of an appreciation of the tastiness of his mom's homemade dish.

Murphy then talks about white people out on the town, criticizing their embarrassing dance moves, leading onto Italian-Americans being inspired by Rocky, then culminates to a bit about fighting in a discotheque with Deney Terrio, eventually starting a large-scale brawl after which "everybody sued me" for millions of dollars.

After the fight, Murphy calls his parents, leading to a long impression of his drunken stepfather (another call-back to a popular bit from Delirious). This final segment runs for over ten minutes and incorporates his stepfather's habit of misquoting Motown songs (including "Ain't Too Proud to Beg", which opened the film).

== Cast (opening segment) ==
- Eddie Murphy as himself
- Tatyana Ali as Eddie's sister (sketch)
- Deon Richmond as Little Eddie (sketch)
- Billie Allen as Eddie's aunt (sketch)
- James Brown III as Thanksgiving guest
- Michelle Davison as Thanksgiving guest
- Leonard Jackson as Uncle Gus (sketch)
- Samuel L. Jackson as Eddie's Uncle
- Warren Morris as Poetry reader
- Basil Wallace as Eddie's Father (sketch)
- Damien Wayans as Child running in the house
- Ellis E. Williams as Eddie's Uncle (sketch)
- Carol Woods as Eddie's Aunt
- Kim Wayans as Interviewed fan (uncredited)

== Rating ==
The film was originally given an "X" rating by the MPAA, but several cuts from Murphy's performance were made to secure an "R" rating.

== Records ==
The film surpassed Richard Pryor: Live on the Sunset Strip as the highest-grossing concert film, earning a gross of $50.5 million.

The film contained the word "fuck" 223 times, setting the record for highest "fuck count" ever in a feature-length, theatrically released film at the time (surpassing Scarface). Raw held the record until 1990 before being surpassed by Goodfellas.

== Critical reception ==
The New York Times praised Eddie Murphy's stand-up routine.

Michael Wilmington of the Los Angeles Times wrote that it was "a surprisingly poor concert film of Murphy’s stand-up act," saying Murphy is "like a musician with fabulous technique playing 'Chopsticks.'"

Alfonso Ribeiro, who played Carlton Banks on The Fresh Prince of Bel-Air, said he drew inspiration from Murphy's depiction of white people dancing in developing "The Carlton" for his character.

Gabriel Iglesias credits Raw for inspiring him to become a comedian. A scene in his 2014 stand-up comedy film The Fluffy Movie depicts a young Iglesias renting the rated-R film despite being underage.

On Rotten Tomatoes, the film holds a rating of 79% from 24 reviews with the consensus: "Like its title suggests, Eddie Murphy Raw is a searingly unbridled and viciously funny showcase from one of comedy's best." Metacritic, which uses a weighted average, assigned the film a score of 54 out of 100, based on 10 critics, indicating "mixed or average" reviews. Siskel and Ebert gave it a split-decision on their show.

== See also ==
- Eddie Murphy filmography
