= Joseph Sterrett =

Joseph Sterrett may refer to:

- Joseph Sterett (1773–1821), or Sterrett, Maryland militia officer
- Joseph Edmund Sterrett (1870–1934), American accountant
- Joe Sterrett (born 1955), American football coach
