= Steven Johnson (American football) =

American football player (born 1988)

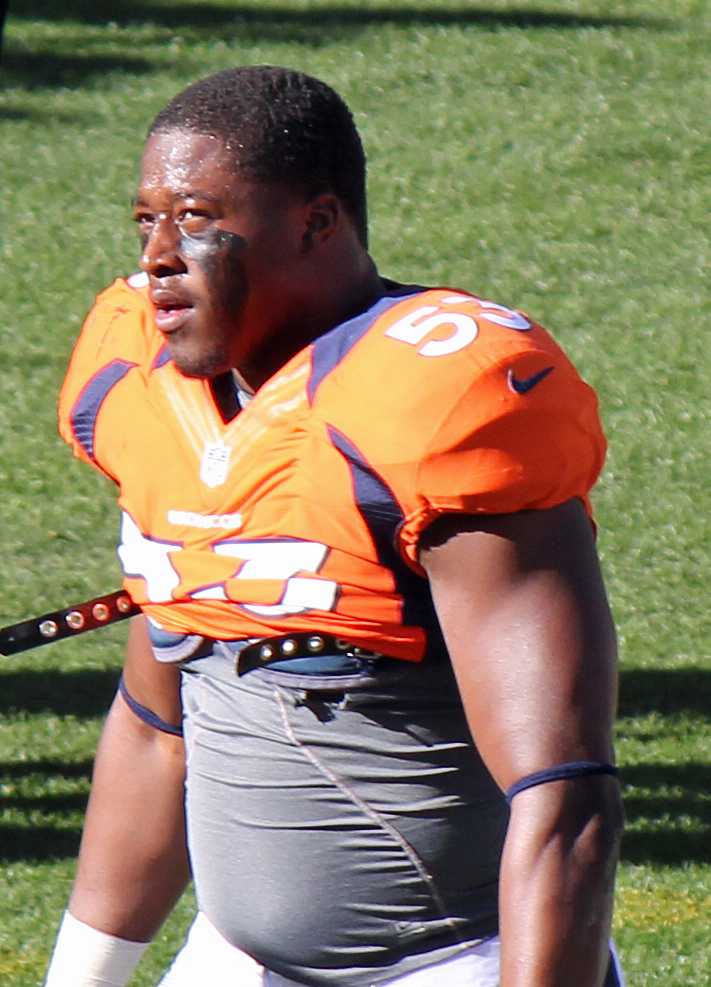
- Johnson with the Denver Broncos in 2012

No. 53, 52, 51, 58, 59
- Position: Linebacker

Personal information
- Born: March 28, 1988 (age 38); Media, Pennsylvania, U.S.
- Listed height: 6 ft 1 in (1.85 m)
- Listed weight: 239 lb (108 kg)

Career information
- High school: Strath Haven (Wallingford, Pennsylvania)
- College: Kansas
- NFL draft: 2012: undrafted

Career history
- Denver Broncos (2012–2014); Tennessee Titans (2015); Pittsburgh Steelers (2016–2017); Baltimore Ravens (2017); Arizona Hotshots (2019); Seattle Dragons (2020)

Awards and highlights
- XFL tackles leader (2020); Mid Season All-XFL (2020); Second-team All-Big 12 (2011)

Career NFL statistics
- Total tackles: 68
- Sacks: 0.5
- Forced fumbles: 4
- Fumble recoveries: 3
- Stats at Pro Football Reference

Steven Mickail Johnson Jr. (born March 28, 1988) is an American former professional football player who was a linebacker in the National Football League (NFL). He signed with the Denver Broncos as an undrafted free agent in 2012 where he spent three seasons before signing with the Tennessee Titans in 2015. He played college football for the Kansas Jayhawks. He was also a member of the Pittsburgh Steelers, Baltimore Ravens, Arizona Hotshots, and Seattle Dragons.

== Early life ==
Johnson attended Strath Haven High School in Wallingford, Pennsylvania, where he played linebacker; however, he struggled to impress coaches the way some of his teammates did. After one year on the freshman team and two years of junior varsity, he became a starter for his varsity team during his senior year. That year, he led the state of Pennsylvania with 114 tackles and being selected for All-state second team. Despite his successful senior year, he did not receive an offer to play collegiate football at any level.

Without any collegiate offers, Johnson enrolled at Wyoming Seminary in 2006 to continue his education and play football. After only five games, he recorded 62 tackles, two interceptions, and four rushing touchdowns. His performance began to earn the attention of college scouts until he tore his ACL, LCL, and capsule in his left knee. His football career appeared to be over.

After a long period of recovery, Johnson started contacting colleges about playing football. He only received an invitation to walk-on at the University of Kansas, after contacting several colleges.

== College career ==
Johnson played college football at the University of Kansas after walking on to the team. He did not receive a scholarship until just before his junior season when he impressed coaches at practice.

Johnson recorded nine tackles and a sack during his sophomore season, and one tackle during his freshman season.

In his junior season, Johnson had 95 tackles, two sacks and three pass deflections. On September 4, 2010, In the season opener, he recorded nine tackles against North Dakota State. On September 25, 2010, he recorded eight tackles and a sack in a game against New Mexico State.

In his senior season, Johnson had 120 tackles, three pass deflections, two forced fumbles and an interception. In 2011, he was selected to the Phil Steele's Midseason All-Big 12 Third Team. On September 3, 2011, in the season opener, he recorded 15 tackles and a forced fumble against McNeese State. On September 17, 2011, he had 11 tackles in a loss to Georgia Tech. On October 15, 2011, he recorded 13 tackles, an interception and two pass deflections against the #3 ranked Oklahoma Sooners.

Johnson finished college with 225 tackles, three sacks, six pass deflections, two forced fumbles and an interception. In January 2012, he played in the 2012 East–West Shrine Game.

== Professional career ==
Pre-draft measurables
Height	Weight	Arm length	Hand span	40-yard dash	10-yard split	20-yard split	20-yard shuttle	Three-cone drill	Vertical jump	Broad jump	Bench press
6 ft 0 1/2 in (1.84 m)	239 lb (108 kg)	32 3/8 in (0.82 m)	9 3/8 in (0.24 m)	4.71 s	1.61 s	2.68 s	4.38 s	7.08 s	37.0 in (0.94 m)	9 ft 10 in (3.00 m)	17 reps
All values from NFL Combine/Pro Day

=== Denver Broncos ===
On April 29, 2012, Johnson signed with the Denver Broncos as an undrafted free agent. On August 31, 2012, he made the 53-man roster. He played three seasons with the Broncos, starting in seven games for the team.

During the 2013 season, in a game against the Philadelphia Eagles, Johnson blocked a punt and recovered it for a touchdown. In Week 11 against the Kansas City Chiefs, he came in for a defensive play where he stopped Jamaal Charles at the goal line and denied him a touchdown on third down.

On September 5, 2015, Johnson was released by the Broncos.

=== Tennessee Titans ===
Johnson was claimed off waivers by the Tennessee Titans on September 6, 2015. He played in all 16 games, mostly on special teams, with the Titans where he recorded seven tackles during the 2015 season.

=== Pittsburgh Steelers ===
Johnson signed a one-year contract with the Pittsburgh Steelers on March 25, 2016. On September 3, 2016, he was released by the Steelers as part of final roster cuts. The following day, the Steelers signed him to a one-year, $760,000 contract after Bud Dupree suffered an injury. He was placed on injured reserve on November 15, 2016, after suffering an ankle injury in Week 10.

On February 15, 2017, Johnson signed a one-year contract extension with the Steelers. On September 2, 2017, Johnson was released by the Steelers, but was re-signed two days later. He was released on September 9, 2017, but was re-signed three days later. He was released again on September 23, 2017.

=== Baltimore Ravens ===
On October 17, 2017, Johnson signed with the Baltimore Ravens.

=== Arizona Hotshots ===
On November 9, 2018, Johnson signed with the Arizona Hotshots of the Alliance of American Football (AAF) for the 2019 season. In the season opener against the Salt Lake Stallions, Johnson intercepted quarterback Matt Linehan in the second half. The league ceased operations in April 2019.

=== Seattle Dragons ===
In October 2019, as part of the 2020 XFL draft, Johnson was selected by the Seattle Dragons. He had his contract terminated when the league suspended operations on April 10, 2020.

== Personal life ==
In 2014, Johnson started the Faith Motivated Foundation to help kids and adults to set and achieve goals, take care of their health and rely on their faith.
