= Sharpless =

Sharpless is a surname. Notable people with the surname include:

- Bevan Sharpless (1904–1950), American solar system astronomer
- Christopher Sharpless (1945–2025), American 1988 Winter Olympics bobsledder
- Isaac Sharpless (1848–1920), American educator
- Josh Sharpless (born 1988), American baseball player
- Karl Barry Sharpless (born 1941), American chemist and Nobel prize winner
- Mattie R. Sharpless (born 1943), American diplomat
- Nathan J. Sharpless (1823–1893), American politician from Pennsylvania
- Norman Sharpless (born 1966), American oncologist and director of the National Cancer Institute
- John Sharpless (born 1946), American retired history professor
- Stewart Sharpless (1926–2013), American galactic astronomer
  - Sharpless catalog, a 20th-century astronomical catalog with 313 items
- Disappearance of Toni Sharpless (born 1979), American nurse who disappeared in 2009

== Fictional characters ==
- A character in Madama Butterfly

== See also ==
- Sharpless asymmetric dihydroxylation, a chemical reaction
- Sharpless epoxidation, a chemical reaction
- Sharpless oxyamination, a chemical reaction
