= Joe Sterrett =

American football player and coach

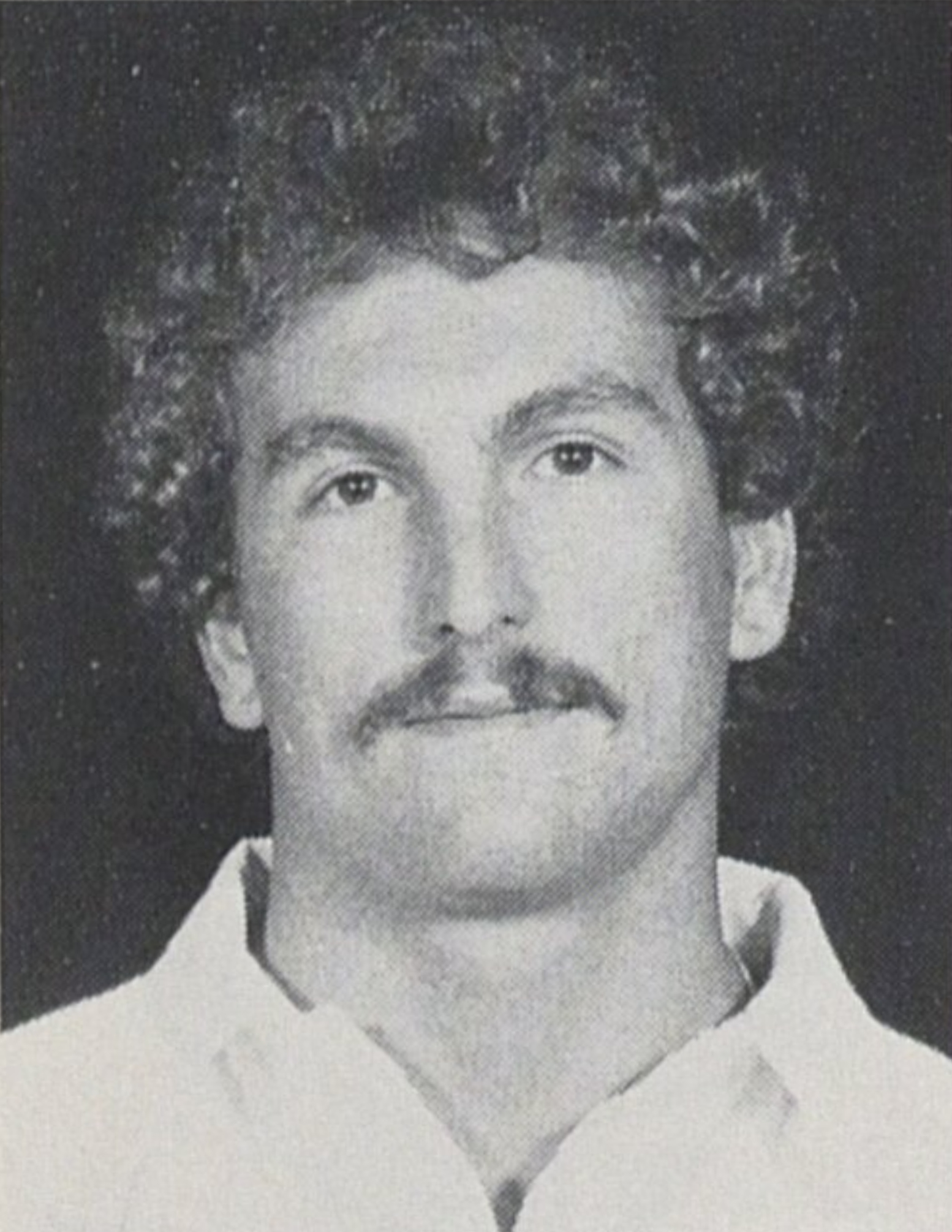
Sterrett in 1977

Joe Sterrett (born 1954 or 1955) is an American retired football player and coach. Sterrett attended Lehigh University and was a football coach for the school, before eventually becoming the Dean of Athletics.

== Life and career ==
Joseph D. Sterrett was born in 1954 or 1955. In his childhood, Sterrett enjoyed sports. He attended Nether Providence High School in Wallingford, where he played football. Sterrett was named the PMC Colleges Offensive Player of the Year in 1971 and played quarterback on the All-Delco football team.

Sterrett originally intended to go to law school, but deferred his admission and went to Lehigh instead. Sterrett attended Lehigh University as an undergraduate student athlete starting in September 1972. He received his bachelor's degree in 1976, majoring in social psychology and finance, and married another graduate that year, with whom he had four children. At Lehigh, he studied for a master's degree in Educational Leadership, which he received in 1978, simultaneous with the start of his coaching career. Sterrett received a doctorate from Temple University in 1984.

He played for Lehigh's football team as a junior quarterback and quarterback. In 1975, he was named as a Division I All American. During the 1975 Lehigh–Lafayette rivalry game, Sterrett was named the MVP. He broke Lehigh's season record for touchdown passes in 1975, with 21 scores. He coached Lehigh's junior varsity team in 1976 and 1977 and spent seven years as a football coach at Lehigh. During his tenure, Lehigh won the Division II national championship.

After leaving the athletics department for three years to work in admissions, he returned in July 1989 as Dean of Athletics following John Whitehead's retirement. One year later, in 1990, he oversaw Lehigh's entry into the newly-formed Patriot League and sat on several of the league's committees. Sterrett helped form the Patriot League while at Lehigh. Sterrett announced in 2024 that he would retire at the end of the year and was replaced by Jeremy Gibson.

Sterrett was named an All-American in football in 1975, the third Lehigh athlete ever to received the award. He has received the Undergraduate Merit Award in 1976, the Alfred P. Robinson Award in 1986, the University Award for Distinguished Service in 1998, the Paul J. Franz Award in 1999, and the Hillman Staff Award in 2004. In 2011, he was named the Athletic Director of the Year in the FCS Northeast. In 2025, Sterrett was inducted into the Lehigh Athletics Hall of Fame.
