= Kim Maslin-Kammerdeiner =

American soccer player (born 1964)

Personal information
- Full name: Kimberlee Kammerdeiner
- Birth name: Kimberlee Maslin
- Date of birth: August 12, 1964 (age 62)
- Place of birth: United States
- Height: 5 ft 7 in (1.70 m)
- Position: Goalkeeper

College career
Years	Team	Apps	(Gls)
1983–1986	George Mason Patriots		

International career
1988–1991	United States	17	(0)
Medal record
FIFA Women's World Cup
Gold medal – first place	1991 USA	Team competition

Kimberlee Kammerdeiner (née Maslin; born August 12, 1964) is an American retired soccer goalkeeper and former member of the United States women's national soccer team. Considered a pioneer of women's soccer in the United States, she was a member of the 1991 United States women's national soccer team that won the first Women's World Cup in China. From 1988 to 1991, she played 843 minutes without allowing a goal – a record at the time. In 1990, she was named to the Soccer America all-decade team.

== Early life ==
Kim grew up in Rutledge, Pennsylvania. Since there was no high school girls soccer team to play on at that time at Swarthmore High School, she played goalie in the boys' soccer program for two seasons. First, she played on the boy's JV team as a sophomore, and then on the boy's varsity team as a junior. She was also a standout in Field Hockey, Basketball and Lacrosse, and elected to play field hockey instead of soccer in her senior high school season. She also played her club soccer for the Landsdowne Misfits, a girls travel team. Recruited for multiple sports with NCAA D-I scholarship offers for field hockey, soccer and lacrosse, she elected to play soccer for George Mason University.

=== George Mason University ===
Maslin-Kammerdeiner attended George Mason University and played for the Patriots, first as a field player for two seasons, and later as a goaltender, leading the Patriots to an upset in the NCAA Division I championship game against the North Carolina Tar Heels in 1985.

== Playing career ==
=== International ===
Maslin-Kammerdeiner parlayed her NCAA title success into a tryout for the US National Team, then coached by Anson Dorrance, who was head coach at North Carolina, the team Maslin's GMU Patriots had beaten in the 1985 Championship. She was selected to, and played for the United States women's national soccer team from 1988 to 1991, with 17 National Team appearances (caps) in that time frame, recording nine shutouts, including her first 843 minutes of her international career without allowing a goal – a record that still stands. In 1991, she was the starting goalie for the US National team for much of the World Cup qualifying period, but lost her starting job shortly before the 1991 World Cup after losing some pre-World Cup exhibition games. She became the back-up goaltender on the US team that won the first Women's World Cup in China.

She retired from competition after the 1991 World Cup, and later became a school teacher and soccer coach in Virginia.
