= Mark Jones (American football) =

American football player (born 1980)

No. 89, 11, 84
- Position: Wide receiver

Personal information
- Born: November 3, 1980 (age 46); Wallingford, Pennsylvania, U.S.
- Listed height: 5 ft 9 in (1.75 m)
- Listed weight: 185 lb (84 kg)

Career information
- High school: Strath Haven (Wallingford)
- College: Tennessee
- NFL draft: 2004: 7th round, 206th overall pick

Career history
- Tampa Bay Buccaneers (2004)*; New York Giants (2004); Tampa Bay Buccaneers (2005–2007); San Diego Chargers (2008)*; Carolina Panthers (2008); Tennessee Titans (2009); Tampa Bay Storm (2012)
- * Offseason or practice squad member only

Career NFL statistics
- Receptions: 3
- Receiving yards: 41
- Return yards: 3,152
- Stats at Pro Football Reference
- Stats at ArenaFan.com

Mark Christopher Jones (born November 3, 1980) is an American former professional football player who was a wide receiver in the National Football League (NFL). He was selected by the Tampa Bay Buccaneers in the seventh round of the 2004 NFL draft. He played college football for the Tennessee Volunteers.

Jones was also a member of the New York Giants, San Diego Chargers, Carolina Panthers, Tennessee Titans and Tampa Bay Storm.

== College career ==
After leading Strath Haven High School to two PIAA state championships, Mark Jones played all over the field at the University of Tennessee, seeing action at wide receiver, safety, punt returner, and kick returner. For his career, he caught 36 passes for 556 yards (a 15.4 avg.) and five touchdowns, all during his senior season in 2003. He also rushed seven times for 65 yards. As a defensive back, Jones racked up 116 career tackles, four interceptions, ten defended passes, two forced fumbles, one tackle for a loss, and one recovered fumble. On the special teams side of the ball, he returned 46 punts for 543 yards and one touchdown; he also returned four kickoffs for 138 yards and one touchdown. His longest kickoff return was 82 yards for a touchdown against the University of Alabama in his junior year (2002). In his senior year, he ranked second in the SEC and third in the national standings, averaging 15.7 yards per punt return. Jones majored in psychology.

== Professional career ==
=== Tampa Bay Buccaneers (first stint) ===
Jones was drafted by the Tampa Bay Buccaneers with the 206th pick of the 2004 NFL draft. However, he was waived on September 5, 2004.

=== New York Giants ===
Jones was then picked up by the New York Giants the next day. Jones was the primary punt returner for the Giants, starting in 14 games at the spot. He also lined up at wide receiver and defensive back occasionally throughout the season. Jones finished the season with 227 yards on 34 returns (6.7 average) and his longest return was for 29 yards. He also returned two kickoffs for 37 yards, with a long of 20 yards. Jones, however did not make an impact with the Giants, and after missing the last two games with an injury, was released.

=== Tampa Bay Buccaneers (second stint) ===
The Giants released Mark Jones on September 3, 2005, and he was picked up by the Buccaneers on September 7. He played in all sixteen regular season games and the Buccaneers' only playoff game against the Washington Redskins. Because of the Buccaneers' #1 defense, the opposing team was forced to punt to Jones, which is why he led the team with an NFL-best 51 punt returns for 492 yards. In a game against the Atlanta Falcons, Jones returned a punt in overtime 28 yards to set up a game-winning Matt Bryant field goal. Jones returned four punts for 37 yards in the NFC Wild Card Round. Following a season-ending knee injury suffered on October 21, 2007, Jones was placed on IR October 24.

=== San Diego Chargers ===
On June 20, 2008, Jones signed with the San Diego Chargers. He was released on August 30 during final cuts.

=== Carolina Panthers ===
Jones was signed by the Carolina Panthers after the team waived wide receiver Dominique Thompson. He returned 39 punts and 40 kickoffs for 1,433 yards in 2008, his only season with the team. In Carolina's Divisional Round playoff loss to Arizona, he returned five kickoffs for 151 yards.

=== Tennessee Titans ===
Jones was signed by the Tennessee Titans on March 18, 2009, after incumbent returner Chris Carr signed with the Baltimore Ravens. The Titans released Jones on September 4. He was re-signed on September 29. On May 25, 2010, his contract was terminated.

== Personal life ==
Mark Jones was a community contributor with the Giants in 2004, helping out as a professor at the Giants' "Football 101" program in New York City. He also spoke to children in New York elementary schools about staying healthy and making right choices. In high school, he was a starting tailback and defensive back for four years at Strath Haven High School in Wallingford, Pennsylvania. He was the Pittsburgh Post-Gazette Player of the Year and USA Today Player of the Year for Pennsylvania in 1999. Jones led his high school team to a 15–0 record as a senior and was named Class 3A All-State.
