= Carl Gersbach =

American football player (born 1947)

No. 69, 56, 54, 59
- Position: Linebacker

Personal information
- Born: January 8, 1947 (age 79); Syracuse, New York, U.S.
- Listed height: 6 ft 1 in (1.85 m)
- Listed weight: 230 lb (104 kg)

Career information
- High school: Swarthmore
- College: Duke; West Chester
- NFL draft: 1970: undrafted

Career history
- Philadelphia Eagles (1970); Minnesota Vikings (1971–1972); San Diego Chargers (1973–1974); Chicago Bears (1975); St. Louis Cardinals (1976)
- Stats at Pro Football Reference

Carl Gersbach (born January 8, 1947) is an American former professional football player who was a linebacker for seven seasons in the National Football League (NFL) for the Philadelphia Eagles. Minnesota Vikings, San Diego Chargers, Chicago Bears, and St. Louis Cardinals. He played college football for the Duke Blue Devils and West Chester Golden Rams after playing at Swarthmore High School in Swarthmore, Pennsylvania, and at The Manlius School in Manlius, New York.
