= Dan Connor (American football) =

American football player and coach (born 1985)

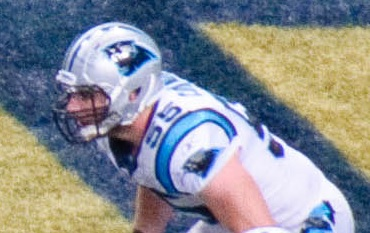
- Connor with the Carolina Panthers in 2010

Penn State Nittany Lions
- Title: Linebackers coach

Personal information
- Born: November 2, 1985 (age 41); Wallingford, Pennsylvania, U.S.
- Listed height: 6 ft 2 in (1.88 m)
- Listed weight: 241 lb (109 kg)

Career information
- High school: Strath Haven (Wallingford)
- College: Penn State
- NFL draft: 2008: 3rd round, 74th overall pick

Career history

Playing
- Carolina Panthers (2008–2011); Dallas Cowboys (2012); New York Giants (2013); Carolina Panthers (2013)

Coaching
- West Chester (2014–2015) Linebackers; Archbishop John Carroll HS (PA) (2016–2017) Head coach; Widener (2018–2021) Defensive coordinator; Penn State (2022–2024) Defensive analyst; Penn State (2025–present) Linebackers coach

Awards and highlights
- Chuck Bednarik Award (2007); 2× First-team All-American (2006, 2007); First-team All-Big Ten (2007); Second-team All-Big Ten (2006); Senior Bowl North MVP (2008)

Career NFL statistics
- Total tackles: 216
- Sacks: 1
- Forced fumbles: 1
- Fumble recoveries: 1
- Stats at Pro Football Reference

Daniel Murphy Connor (born November 2, 1985) is an American football coach and a former linebacker in the National Football League (NFL) for the Carolina Panthers, Dallas Cowboys and New York Giants. He played college football at Penn State University, where he is currently the linebackers coach.

== Early life ==
Connor was born in Wallingford, Pennsylvania. He attended Strath Haven High School, where he was a four-year starter and was rated the number one linebacker in the country. He was also named to the USA Today Top 25 Supreme Team. He played in the 2004 U.S. Army All-American Bowl.

As a junior, he rushed for over 1,500 yards and scored 29 touchdowns. On defense, he had more than 160 tackles to go along with 3 interceptions. As a senior, he rushed 231 times for 1,807 yards and 28 touchdowns, while making 141 tackles, 11 sacks and 3 interceptions.

Connor started in 59 straight games and helped the team achieve a 56–3 record. He finished his high school career with 461 tackles, 38 sacks, 19 interceptions, 591 carries for 4,556 yards and 77 rushing touchdowns. He also practiced basketball and track.

== College career ==
Connor attended Pennsylvania State University, where he played for coach Joe Paterno's Penn State Nittany Lions football team from 2004 to 2007. He earned All-America honors his junior and senior seasons at Penn State and passed Nittany Lion great Paul Posluszny on November 3, 2007, to become first on Penn State's career tackles list.

Connor's game-high nine tackles along with an interception of a Colt Brennan pass in the 2008 Senior Bowl earned him the game's Under Armour Award—essentially the North team's MVP.

== Professional career ==
=== Pre-draft ===
Pre-draft measurables
Height	Weight	Arm length	Hand span	40-yard dash	10-yard split	20-yard split	20-yard shuttle	Three-cone drill	Vertical jump	Broad jump	Bench press
6 ft 2 3/8 in (1.89 m)	231 lb (105 kg)	32 1/8 in (0.82 m)	8 7/8 in (0.23 m)	4.67 s	1.58 s	2.70 s	4.25 s	6.78 s	35.0 in (0.89 m)	9 ft 7 in (2.92 m)	21 reps
All values from NFL Combine/Pro Day

Connor's superlative college career led to his #23 ranking on Sports Illustrated's list of the top 25 2008 NFL draft candidates. He left the NFL Combine after getting sick.

=== Carolina Panthers (first stint) ===
Connor was selected by the Carolina Panthers in the third round (74th overall) of the 2008 NFL draft. Due to the Panthers' wealth of talent at linebacker, Connor played sparingly—mostly on special teams—in the first 3 weeks before a torn ACL suffered during a loss to the Minnesota Vikings ended his season. On September 23, he was placed on the injured reserve list. He had 4 special teams tackles.

In 2009, he played mainly on special teams, collecting 14 special teams tackles (led the team), 19 defensive tackles, one quarterback pressure and one fumble recovery.

In 2010, despite reportedly fielding several trade inquiries during the offseason, the Panthers made it clear Connor would compete for a starting job that season after the team released veteran linebacker Na'il Diggs. He competed for the strongside linebacker position with James Anderson, before he was named the starter at middle linebacker after Jon Beason was moved to weakside linebacker. On November 9, he was placed on the injured reserve list with a fractured hip bone and Beason was moved back to middle linebacker. Connor finished with 60 tackles, one sack, 4 quarterback pressures and one pass defensed.

In 2011, he took over the middle linebacker starter position in the second game after Beason was lost for the year with a torn left Achilles tendon. He was inactive with a shoulder injury against the Detroit Lions. He registered 87 tackles (third on the team), one forced fumble and 3 special teams tackles.

=== Dallas Cowboys ===
On March 15, 2012, he was signed as a free agent by the Dallas Cowboys to play inside linebacker in the team's 3-4 defense and reuniting him with former Penn State teammate Sean Lee. He became a starter after Lee was lost for the year with a toe injury in the sixth game against the Carolina Panthers. He missed 2 games with a neck injury and was replaced with Ernie Sims. He appeared in 14 games (8 starts), making 58 tackles (3 for loss) and one pass defensed.

On March 11, 2013, Connor was released by the Cowboys.

=== New York Giants ===
On March 16, 2013, Connor signed with the New York Giants. On September 12, he was placed on the injured reserve list with a neck injury and Mark Herzlich replaced him as the starter at middle linebacker. On November 4, he was released with an injury settlement.

=== Carolina Panthers (second stint) ===
On November 13, 2013, he signed an undisclosed one-year deal to return to the Panthers. He appeared in 5 games as a backup and was not re-signed after the season.

== NFL career statistics ==
Legend
**Bold**	Career high

Year	Team	Games		Tackles					Interceptions					Fumbles			
Year	Team	GP	GS	Cmb	Solo	Ast	Sck	TFL	Int	Yds	TD	Lng	PD	FF	FR	Yds	TD
2008	CAR	3	0	4	4	0	0.0	0	0	0	0	0	0	0	0	0	0
2009	CAR	16	0	30	22	8	0.0	0	0	0	0	0	0	0	**1**	0	0
2010	CAR	8	8	47	33	14	**1.0**	**8**	0	0	0	0	**1**	0	0	0	0
2011	CAR	15	11	**75**	**54**	21	0.0	3	0	0	0	0	0	**1**	0	0	0
2012	DAL	14	8	56	32	**24**	0.0	3	0	0	0	0	**1**	0	0	0	0
2013	NYG	1	0	2	1	1	0.0	0	0	0	0	0	0	0	0	0	0
2013	CAR	5	0	2	1	1	0.0	0	0	0	0	0	0	0	0	0	0
		62	27	216	147	69	1.0	14	0	0	0	0	2	1	1	0	0

== Coaching career ==
In September 2014, Connor was hired as linebacker coach at West Chester University under Bill Zwaan. In January 2016, Connor accepted the head coaching position at Archbishop John Carroll High School in Radnor, Pennsylvania. In January 2018, Connor became the defensive coordinator at Widener University.

In February 2022, Connor joined the staff at his alma mater, Penn State as a defensive analyst.
