= The Fluffy Movie =

- Theatrical release poster
- Directed by: Manny Rodriguez
- Written by: Gabriel Iglesias
- Produced by: William Bindley; Ron DeBlasio; Gabriel Iglesias; Mike Karz; Joe Meloche
- Starring: Gabriel Iglesias
- Edited by: Dave Harrison; Tom Costan
- Production company: Gulfstream Pictures
- Distributed by: Open Road Films
- Release date: July 25, 2014
- Running time: 101 minutes
- Country: United States
- Language: English
- Box office: $2.8 million

The Fluffy Movie is a 2014 American stand-up comedy film directed by Manny Rodriguez and starring Gabriel Iglesias. The film was released in theaters on July 25, 2014, by Open Road Films. The concert movie was filmed at two shows on February 28, 2014, and March 1, in San Jose, California at the SAP Center.

== Cast ==
The majority of the film is Iglesias performing his act in San Jose. The beginning of the film serves as a flashback depicting how his parents met and his early youth. One scene shows an 11-year-old Iglesias (portrayed by Julio César Chávez Jr.) getting permission from his mother to see the R-rated stand-up comedy film Raw starring Eddie Murphy, which inspired him to become a comedian himself, before cutting to the special.

- Gabriel Iglesias
- Jacqueline Obradors as Esther P. Mendez
- Jeremy Ray Valdez as Jesús Iglesias
- Julio César Chávez Jr. as Young Gabe
- Gina Brillon as Carmen
- Ron White as Doctor
- Ray William Johnson as Nurse
- Tommy Chong as Video Store Clerk
- Eddie "Piolín" Sotelo as Emcee

Additionally, DJ Chuy Gomez and Martin Moreno, both close friends of Iglesias, cameo in the film as themselves close to the beginning of the film.

== Production ==
On February 13, 2014, it was announced that the film would be released on July 11, 2014, with Open Road Films distributing the film. The concert movie was filmed at two shows on February 28, 2014, and March 1, in San Jose, California.

== Release ==
On July 25, 2014, the film received a limited release at 432 theaters in the United States.

=== Critical response ===
Upon its release, The Fluffy Movie was met with mixed reviews. The review aggregator website Rotten Tomatoes reported a 57% approval rating with an average rating of 5.4/10 based on 14 reviews. On Metacritic, the film achieved an average score of 56 out of 100 based on 11 reviews, signifying "mixed or average reviews".

Frank Scheck of The Hollywood Reporter gave a positive review of the film, remarking that Iglesias "delivers a solid set of often highly personal material that’s consistently amusing even if it never quite hits the level of hilarity". He further noted that Iglesias "is a likeable presence, and his fluid delivery, complete with spot-on accents and sound effects, is consistently engaging." Conversely, Kyle Anderson of Entertainment Weekly gave the film a C and said, "While Iglesias is perfectly competent as a comedian, he lacks the ability to really wrap his arms around his own personal narrative." Mark Jenkins of The Washington Post gave the film two-and-a-half stars, writing that the film's "principal weakness is that it’s not much of a movie". However, Jenkins went on to note that "The balance between the hilarious and the heartwarming is carefully maintained."

=== Box office ===
In North America, the film opened to number 17 in its first weekend, with $1,311,446.
