= Strath Haven High School =

Coordinates: 39.8948°N 75.3719°W

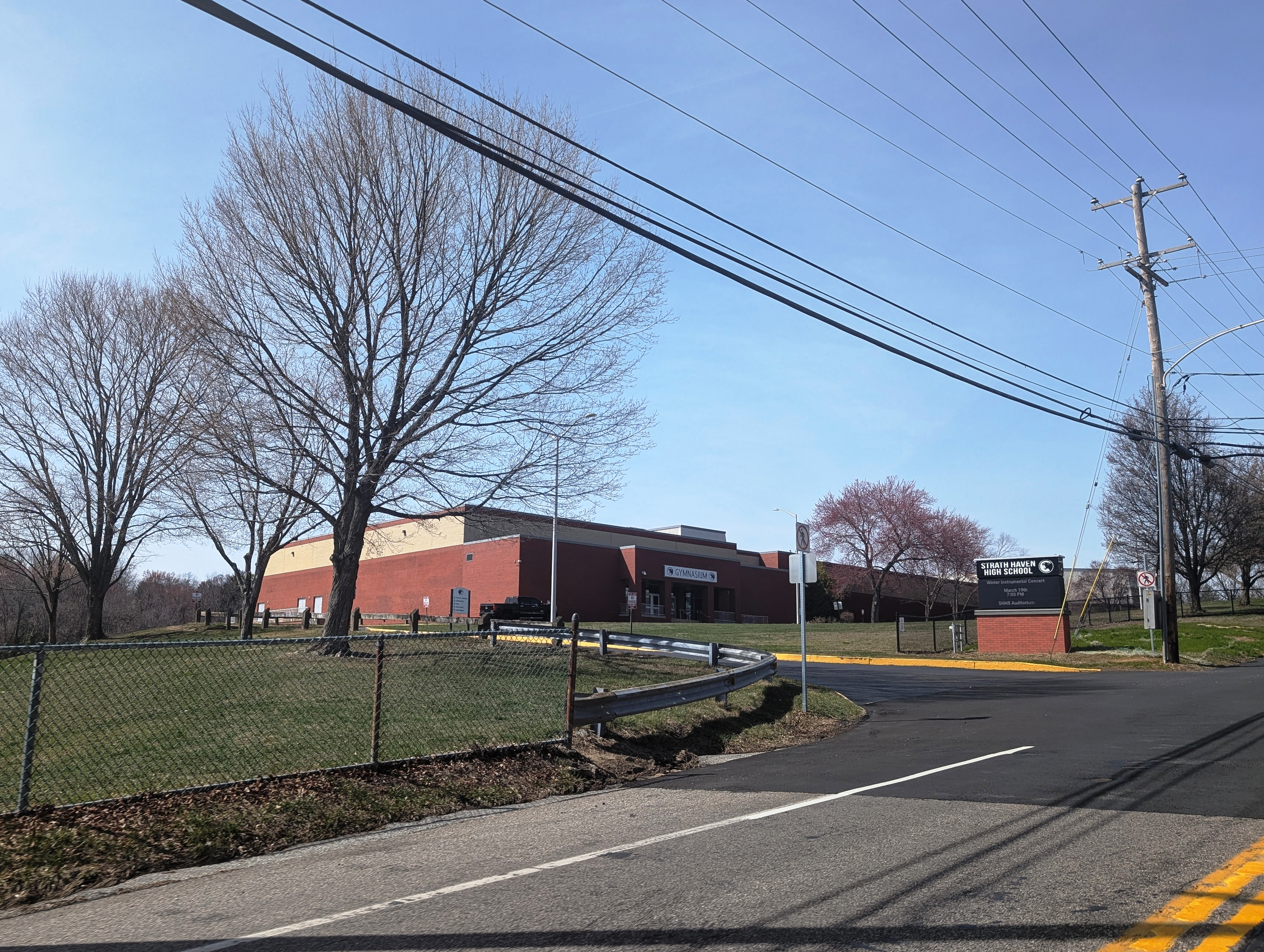

Location
- 205 S Providence Rd; Wallingford, Pennsylvania 19086; United States

Information
- Type: Public high school
- Established: 1983
- School district: Wallingford-Swarthmore School District
- Principal: Andrew Benzing
- Faculty: 88.3 (FTE)
- Grades: 9th – 12th
- Enrollment: 1,175 (2024–25)
- Student to teacher ratio: 13.3
- Colors: Black; Silver; White
- Team name: Panthers
- Feeder schools: Strath Haven Middle School
- Website: https://shhs.wssd.org/

Strath Haven High School (also abbreviated as SHHS) is a four-year public high school in Wallingford, Delaware County, Pennsylvania, enrolling about 1,200 students. SHHS is the only high school in the Wallingford-Swarthmore School District. The school exhibits particular excellence in its special education program, connections to Swarthmore College and technical schools, and strong music and football programs. As of 2025, the principal is Andrew Benzing.

== History ==
Strath Haven High School is the product of a 1983 merger between the former Swarthmore High School and Nether Providence High School. In 1971, Pennsylvania state officials had determined that Wallingford and Nether Providence school districts had too small enrollments to maintain an independent existence. By 1980, enrollment in Swarthmore High school had dropped to the point that maintaining separate middle and high schools was no longer feasible. Because it had smaller enrollment, the district closed Swarthmore High over bitter and acrimonious public protest. (Many parents, opposed to the decision, attempted to form Swarthmore School, a private high school on the former Swarthmore campus.) To mollify those opposed, the district officially closed Nether Providence High School as well, and created an entirely new school on the former Nether Providence campus, named after Strath Haven manor on the Thomas Leiper Estate.

In 2005, the School District of Philadelphia selected then-principal Albert Bichner as Superintendent of High Schools. In response, the school promoted assistant principal Mary Jo Yannacone, who remained principal until June 2018, when she became Assistant Superintendent for Springfield School District. The school was then temporarily led by Andrea LaPira until the selection of Greg Hilden in 2020.

== Overview ==
The typical graduating class is approximately 300 persons.

Former principal Al Bichner organized Strath Haven along the theme of the "Five A's", meaning academics, arts, athletics, altruism, and activities. An oft-cited "Five A's" figure is that around 80% of Strath Haven High School students participate in athletics, music, the arts, and a host of extracurricular clubs.

All students are required to complete four years of study in major subject areas, but also have limited freedom to select "elective" classes. Strath Haven provides guidance counselors to assist in course selection and college and career planning.

A full-time psychologist and communications specialist are the core of a Student Assistance Program providing help to students at risk.

=== Football ===
The school competes in the twelve-team PIAA Central League, winning 10 times between 1996 and 2010. Between 1983 and 2022, the Strath Haven football team achieved an overall record of 280–145. The football team performed especially well in 1999 and 2000. The team won state championships in those years, led by Mark Jones, a former punt returner for the Tennessee Titans, and Dan Connor, an All-American linebacker for Penn State who went on to be drafted by the Carolina Panthers and spent six seasons in the NFL.

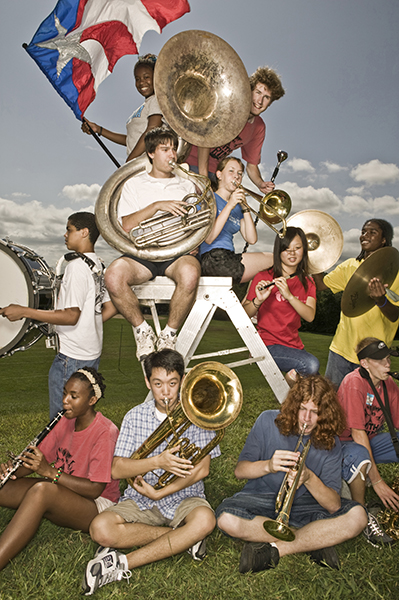
Strath Haven High School Marching Band 2004

=== Marching band ===
Under previous director Jack Hontz, Strath Haven's marching band grew to become the largest band in Pennsylvania and the second largest in the nation. In an average year, the band enrolled about 400 members, or one out of every three students. Since Hontz's death in 2017, Strath Haven's marching band has been directed by Nicholas Pignataro.

=== Visual arts ===
A comprehensive visual arts program at Strath Haven includes introductory and advanced level courses in drawing and painting, graphic design, ceramics, and photography and video. The visual arts department was recognized as an Outstanding Visual Arts Community by the Pennsylvania Art Education Association in 2022.

=== Student publications ===
Strath Haven publishes Jabberwocky, a student-produced literary magazine. The magazine, which is published once a year, includes artwork, poems, short stories, drawings and photographs.

The 240-page Haven Yearbook is produced by a club staff that meets weekly. The yearbook is delivered annually in the fall.

Newspaper club members publish The Panther Press student newspaper in print monthly or bimonthly, with more regular updates posted on the website shpantherpress.com.

The newspaper and yearbook staffs have been recognized with state and national awards, including Keystone Press Awards, National Student Media Awards, the National Federation of Press Women, and the National Scholastic Press Association.

=== Nontraditional education ===
Special education programs are available for students with special needs. Strath Haven High School is known in the area for its high-quality assistance for hearing-impaired and students with disabilities.

The high school has a limited affiliation with Swarthmore College. Exceptional students at the high school can — with the permission of Swarthmore professors — attend classes at the college for high school credit.

Similar partnerships with Delaware County-area technical schools also allow students to train in electrical wiring, machining, auto repair, and other similar vocational skills. Students enrolled in technical school programs spend one-half day at Strath Haven taking a required core curriculum, and one-half day at the technical high school.

== College preparation / Measured performance ==
The school is accredited by the Middle States Association and was awarded the National Blue Ribbon School of Excellence by the Department of Education in 1985 and 2002.

Strath Haven students typically perform well on standardized tests and other measures of secondary school achievement. Typically, about 15 students (5%) are National Merit Scholars; the Strath Haven mean SAT score exceeds the national mean by approximately 80–100 points in each category. Likewise, mean ACT scores exceed the national mean by 5–9 points per category.

== Other ==
On April 2, 2008, Barack Obama held a town hall meeting and Question and Answer session in the Strath Haven High School gymnasium. Later, on November 2, 2008, Senator John McCain held a "Road to Victory Rally" in the school's gymnasium. Senator McCain gave a speech, as did Senator Joe Lieberman, and Former Pennsylvania Governor Tom Ridge.

== Notable alumni ==
- Allie Wilson (class of 2014), Olympic middle-distance runner
- Jacob Hoyle (class of 2012), Olympic fencer
- Cory Wade (class of 2008), model
- Steven Johnson (class of 2006), former NFL player
- Dan Connor (class of 2004), former NFL player
- Bree Lowdermilk (class of 2001), composer
- Mark Jones (class of 1999), former NFL player
- Peter Luzak (class of 1996), former US international soccer player
- Lamar Campbell (class of 1994), former NFL player
- Isaac Jones (class of 1994), former NFL player
- Steve Simeone (class of 1991), comedian
- Andrew Ervin (class of 1989), author
- Bradley S. Jewitt (class of 1988), former politician
- Jay Clayton (class of 1984), former SEC chair
