= Jan Westcott =

American novelist

Jan Westcott (February 23, 1912 – October 29, 2011), born Maryann "Mary" Josephine Vlachos, was an American author of historical fiction.

The daughter of Dutch-born classical scholar Nicholas P. Vlachos, a professor at Temple University, Westcott was born in Philadelphia and raised in the area, graduating from Swarthmore High School. While on summer vacation in Avalon (New Jersey), after attending Swarthmore College for a year, she met and eloped with Richard J. Westcott in 1931, the couple then residing in Camden (New Jersey) where Jan Westcott became a "stay at home mom" to the couple's two sons. Her longstanding interest in history, passed down from her father, was reinforced by the outbreak of World War II. After her husband left to join the army in 1943, Westcott tried her hand at writing a historical novel, which she worked on while her sons were at school and after putting them to bed. The resultant novel, The Border Lord, was published in 1946.

Divorcing her first husband in 1947, Westcott in 1954 married Robert Phelps Barden, the chief radiologist of Chestnut Hill Hospital (Philadelphia). The couple, who had met while both were summering in Avalon, subsequently resided for many years in Philadelphia's Chestnut Hill neighborhood. Westcott, whose fifth novel: The Walsingham Woman, had been published in 1953, had a lower-volume writing career during her second marriage with her eleventh and final novel: A Woman of Quality, being published in 1978, thirty-two years after Westcott's inaugural novel and thirty-three years before the author's passing at age 99.

From The Pittsburgh Press review of The White Rose
"If there exists such a title as Historical Novelist Extraordinary [it] must surely belong to Jan Wescott. Her previous novels have reflected her ability to make history a fascinating subject, [& now in] her most ambitious work...Wescott makes [the era of the Wars of the Roses] as palatable as it will ever be. Her characters are endowed with personalities built on careful research, & the end result is most engaging....At times the tale bogs down with details of battle campaigns, but this is a minor detraction. There are enough fast-moving situations & events to credit this as one of the better historical novels to make the scene."

While promoting her 1969 novel The White Rose – the result of three years' work – Westcott asserted having done thorough research for her novels via the UPenn library. Westcott was indeed praised by some reviewers for her attention to detail: one notice for Captain Barney stated "[she] gets her inspiration from the Encyclopædia Britannica", although others questioned the authenticity of her books. Nevertheless, The Border Lord became a Literary Guild selection, and The Queen's Grace was serialized in the Ladies' Home Journal. Westcott's first two novels in particular were successful, both The Border Lord and Captain For Elizabeth (1948) ranking as New York Times Bestsellers and reportedly each selling a million copies.

Cited as a source of inspiration by romance novelists Karen Harper, Shirlee Busbee, Susanna Kearsley, and Bertrice Small, Jan Westcott had had her papers archived at the Howard Gotlieb Archival Research Center at Boston University.

== Bibliography ==
- The Border Lord (1946)
- Captain for Elizabeth (1948)
- The Hepburn (1950)
- Captain Barney (1951)
- The Walsingham Woman (1953)
- The Queen's Grace (1959)
- Condottiere (1962)
- The White Rose (1969)
- Set Her on a Throne (1972)
- The Tower and the Dream (1973)
- A Woman of Quality (1978)

== See also ==
- Mildred Jordan
