= Gabriel Iglesias Presents Stand Up Revolution =

American stand-up comedy television series

- Genre: Stand-up comedy
- Created by: Gabriel Iglesias
- Presented by: Gabriel Iglesias
- Starring: Gabriel Iglesias; Martin Moreno
- Composer: Ozomatli
- Country of origin: United States
- Original language: English
- No. of seasons: 3
- No. of episodes: 19

Production
- Executive producers: Gabriel Iglesias; John Bravakis; Joel Meloche; Stu Schreiberg
- Running time: 22 minutes
- Production companies: Fluffy Inc. Levity Entertainment Group; Triage Entertainment

Original release
- Network: Comedy Central
- Release: October 6, 2011 – November 8, 2014

Gabriel Iglesias Presents Stand Up Revolution is an American stand-up comedy television series airing on Comedy Central in the United States. Hosted by comedian Gabriel Iglesias, who is best known for his stand-up specials, the show features new material by both himself and other comedians. Each episode opens with a stand up by Iglesias before several other comedians perform, each of whom Iglesias usually introduces with an encore. The show debuted on October 6, 2011, and is executive produced by Iglesias. The program features Gabriel Iglesias as an emcee, features new material, and introduces two or three lesser known comedians looking for a big break on television. Each comedian presents a short set of jokes, which is edited to last about five minutes upon the airing of the show.

== Production ==
Before a season would start, Gabriel and the other comedians would perform on a bigger stage than the normal comedy clubs they would usually perform whenever the season starts. As the show started becoming more and more popular, Comedy Central decided to let Gabriel and his friends perform on television. For each season the show will have a different setting for example, the first season took place in Phoenix, Arizona. Iglesias' friend Martin Moreno appears as his sidekick similar to Conan O'Brien and Andy Richter's relationship. Gabriel also got Ozomatli to serve as the house band and got to write the show's theme song. Gabriel wanted his show to be similar to John Oliver's New York Stand-Up Show but rather than having comedians people already knew, he wanted to introduce his lesser known friends who are comedians.

== Episodes ==
Season	Episodes	Originally released	
Season	Episodes	First released	Last released
1	7	October 6, 2011	November 11, 2011
2	6	October 4, 2012	November 8, 2012
3	6	October 4, 2014	November 8, 2014

=== Season 1 (2011) ===
No. overall	No. in season	Comedians	Original release date
1	1	Alfred Robles, Rick Gutierrez	October 6, 2011
2	2	Dillon Garcia, Rudy Moreno, Paul Varghese	October 13, 2011
3	3	Thea Vidale, Dennis Gaxiola, Noe Gonzalez	October 20, 2011
4	4	Shaun Latham, Tommy Chun, Carlos Oscar	October 27, 2011
5	5	Zhivago Blea, Cleto Rodriguez, Edwin San Juan	November 3, 2011
6	6	Cristela Alonzo, Larry Omaha, Maz Jobrani	November 10, 2011
7	7	Rick Gutierrez, Thea Vidale, Joey CoCo Diaz	November 11, 2011

=== Season 2 (2012) ===
No. overall	No. in season	Comedians	Original release date
8	1	Dov Davidoff, Trevor Noah	October 4, 2012
9	2	Nick Guerra, Gina Yashere	October 11, 2012
10	3	Dillon Garcia, Wil Sylvince	October 18, 2012
11	4	Dustin Ybarra, Thai Rivera	October 25, 2012
12	5	Tony Baker, Alfred Robles	November 1, 2012
13	6	Ian Bagg, Pablo Francisco	November 8, 2012

=== Season 3 (2014) ===
No. overall	No. in season	Comedians	Original release date
14	1	Kabir Singh, Lance Patrick	October 4, 2014
15	2	Mark Viera, Barry Brewer	October 11, 2014
16	3	Shaun Latham, Jerry Rocha	October 18, 2014
17	4	Steve Simeone, G Reilly	October 25, 2014
18	5	Ian Bagg, Mike Merrill	November 1, 2014
19	6	Gina Brillon, Alfred Robles	November 8, 2014

== Awards and nominations ==
In 2012, the series was nominated for an ALMA Award for Favorite TV Reality, Variety, or Comedy Personality or Act.

== Reception ==
A positive review came from Hector Saldaña of the San Antonio Express-News who praised Iglesias and the other comedians he assembled for the show, calling it "one of the all-time funniest comedy package tours" and Iglesias a "comedy genius".

== Home video ==
On November 15, 2011, Gabriel Iglesias Presents Stand Up Revolution was released on DVD and Blu-ray containing the 7 episodes of Gabriel Iglesias Presents Stand Up Revolution season one. Another DVD and Blu-ray release was released on December 26, 2012, with the six episodes of the second season.

== See also ==
- List of programs broadcast by Comedy Central
