= Lance Patrick =

American-born stand-up comedian

Lance Patrick is an American-born stand-up comedian, who made his television debut in 2014, on season three of Comedy Central's Gabriel Iglesias Presents Stand Up Revolution. He was born in Elkhart, Indiana.

== Links ==
- The Daily Telegraph "Thrown in the deep end but now he can joke" Chris Hook (March 20, 2015)
- Scenestr "Lance Patrick Brings A Stand-Up Revolution To Australia" Peter Thrupp (March 16, 2015)
- Comedy Central Press Release (September 15, 2014)
- South Bend Tribune "Elkhart native opens for Iglesias" Jeff Harrell (October 24, 2013)
- The Elkhart Truth "Elkhart-born comedian opening for stand-up star Gabriel Iglesias in South Bend" Angelle Barbazon (October 23, 2013)
- Leader Publication "Michiana comedian to visit Morris Performing Arts Center" Ambrosia Neldon (October 16, 2013)
- Florida Times Union "Comedian with Northeast Florida ties opening for Gabriel Iglesias" David Crumpler (March 22, 2013
