= Bevan Sharpless =

American astronomer (1904–1950)

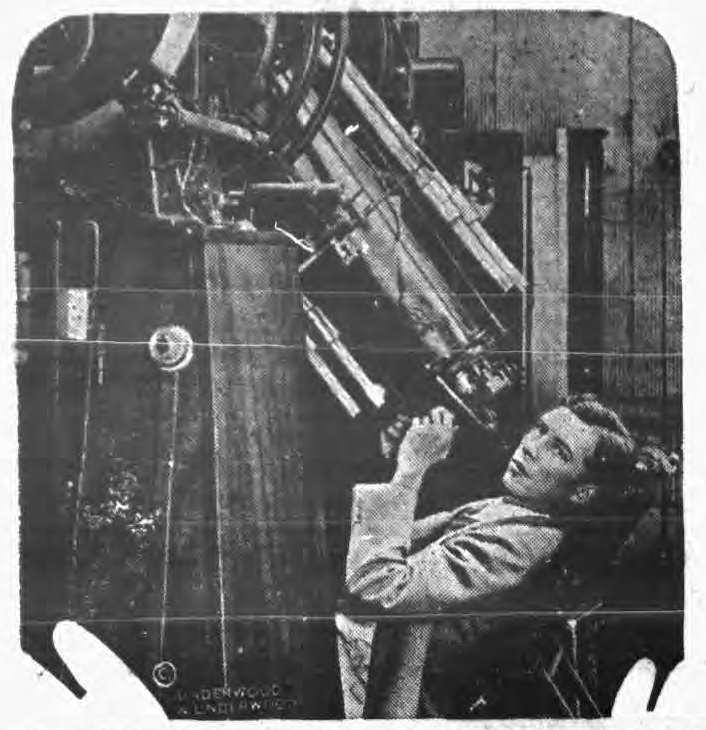
Sharpless at the United States Naval Observatory in a 1930 press photo

Bevan Percival Sharpless (August 2, 1904 – October 28, 1950) was an American astronomer, best known for his 1944 discovery that the orbit of Phobos was decaying.

== Early life ==
Sharpless was born to Ethel Mae Bevan and Albert Wayne Sharpless on August 2, 1904, in Chester Heights, Pennsylvania, the only child of the marriage. He attended Swarthmore High School then Swarthmore College, graduating in 1926 with an A.B. degree in mathematics. In 1923, he traveled with a group from the college to Yerbanis, Mexico to witness an eclipse of September 10, 1923, and again to New Haven, Connecticut, to observe the solar eclipse of January 24, 1925. He married Ethel May Gamble on September 10, 1927, in Glenolden, Pennsylvania.

== Early career ==
For two years after graduation, Sharpless worked as an actuary. He received a temporary appointment with the United States Naval Observatory (USNO) on August 16, 1928; this became a permanent appointment as a junior astronomer on January 16, 1929. At the beginning of 1930, he was elected a member of the American Astronomical Society. He was a member of a USNO expedition to Niuafoʻou in the Tonga Islands to make observations of the solar eclipse of October 21, 1930.

== Phobos ==
In 1929, Harry Edward Burton, head of the Equatorial Division at the USNO, discovered anomalies in the orbital longitude of Phobos, the larger moon of Mars. In 1939, he and Sharpless began a systematic study of the orbital behavior of Phobos and Deimos. Sharpless's photographic observations with a 40-inch Ritchey-Chrétien reflector were inferior to Burton's visual observations with a 26-inch refractor (an instrument more suited for high-precision observations), but Sharpless was sooner ready to publish. Another USNO astronomer, Edgar W. Woolard, published on the same secular accelerations in 1944 (naming Sharpless as the inspiration), but his work was focused on numerical rather than observational analysis. Sharpless's 1945 paper Secular accelerations in the longitudes of the satellites of Mars drawing on observations from 1879 to 1941, was the first to compute these accelerations. They provided the first evidence that Phobos's orbit was decaying and would result in its destruction. Sharpless's paper also computed much smaller accelerations for Deimos.

Sharpless's work was of little interest outside his field for a decade (though it did spark further work in planetary satellites), until Iosif Shklovsky began studying the cause of the decay in the late 1950s. Working off the hypothesis that the decay was caused by interactions with Mars's thin atmosphere, Shklovsky concluded that Phobos might be a hollow metal object as little as 6 centimetres (2.4 in) thick—an unambiguously artificial object. Though Shklovsky later claimed to Patrick Moore that the paper was nothing more than a practical joke, it was taken seriously by others including Carl Sagan and national science adviser Fred Singer, who commented:

If the satellite is indeed spiraling inward as deduced from astronomical observation, then there is little alternative to the hypothesis that it is hollow and therefore Martian made. The big 'if' lies in the astronomical observations; they may well be in error. Since they are based on several independent sets of measurements taken decades apart by different observers with different instruments, systematic errors may have influenced them.

Singer's speculations were correct; Sharpless's calculations were affected by differences between observations. Additionally, the orbital decay is caused not by atmospheric drag, but by solid body tidal forces not considered by Shklovsky. Nonetheless, Sharpless's work stands as the first useful calculation of Phobos's secular acceleration. (His calculations for Deimos, conversely, were deemed "barely significant" due to their high systematic error.) Both Sharpless and Shklovsky have craters on Phobos named in their honor.

== Later career and death ==
Sharpless published in 1946 on photographic observation of comets, work that was conducted in 1943.

Suffering from emphysema, Sharpless retired from the Naval Observatory's Washington, D.C. office on January 1, 1949, and moved to its Florida office at Naval Air Station Richmond. Long in poor health, he died on October 28, 1950, in Atlanta, Georgia.
