= Terry Irving (producer) =

American producer, consultant, and author

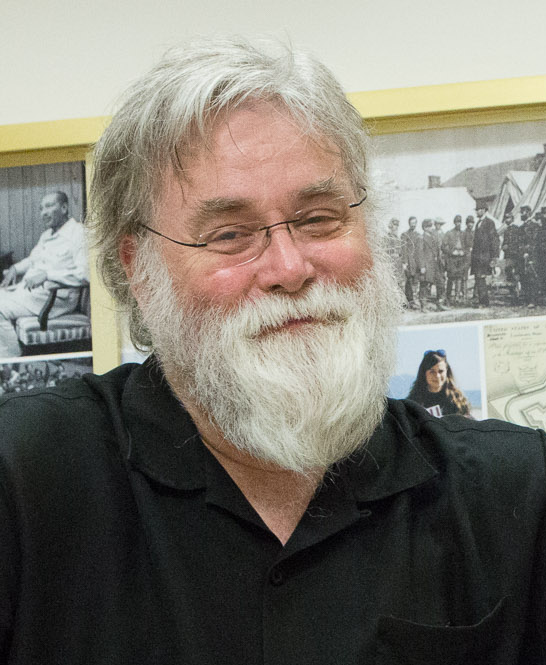
Irving in 2017

Terry Irving is an American producer, consultant, and author. He has spent decades in the media industry and, within the last few years, has expanded his talents to the writing world.

== Media career ==
Irving's media career started in 1973 when he rode a BMW motorcycle and delivered news film to ABC during the Watergate scandal. By 1974, Irving became a producer for ABC news. He worked at ABC for 19 years. Afterwards, he spent decades producing, writing, or consulting for various media organizations, such as Fox News, MSNBC, TV on the Web, CNN, Bloomberg, and PBS. From early 2011 to late 2012, he worked as the senior producer on “The Truth about Money with Ric Edelman” and “Rescue in the Philippines.”

He is working on an autobiographical series called “On the Road” that details his long career in national television.

== Writing career ==
Since 2013, Irving has involved himself in the writing world. He subcontracted the release, editing, and publication of several publications, including Gold for San Joaquin by Cliff Roberts and Overreach by Jeff Ludwig.

Irving has several works of his own. He released his debut novel, Courier, under his own publishing company, Ronin Robot Press. This book is the first of his intended series “Freelancer.” He wrote an accompanying screenplay to Courier, which reportedly piqued the interests of several Hollywood production firms. The book's follow-up, Warrior, was published under Ronin Robot Press on July 1, 2015.

In April 2015, he published his second novel, Day of the Dragonking, on Amazon. He plans to make this novel the first entry in a series entitled “The Last American Wizard.”

A book he edited, Yasutsune "Tony" Hirashiki's "On the Frontlines of the Television War" was released by Casemate Press as its #1 book for Spring 2017.
