= Wallingford-Swarthmore School District =

School district in Pennsylvania, United States

Address
- 200 South Providence Road Wallingford, Delaware County, Pennsylvania, 19086; United States

District information
- Grades: K through 12
- Superintendent: Dr. Russell Johnston
- Schools: 3 Elementary; 1 Middle; 1 High
- NCES District ID: 4224790

Students and staff
- Students: 3,707
- Teachers: 289
- Staff: 233.5
- Student–teacher ratio: 12.8:1
- District mascot: The Panther

Other information
- Website: wssd.org

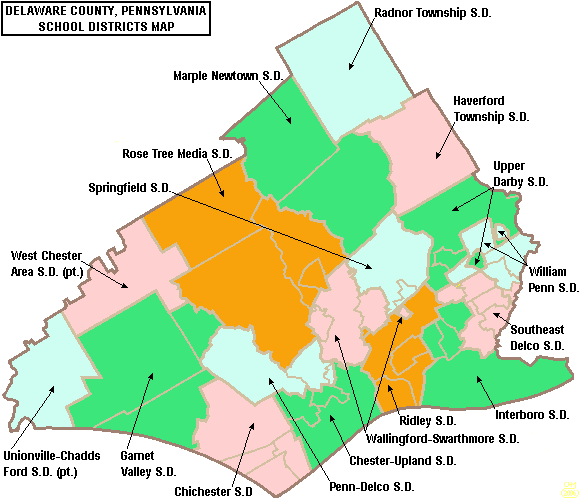
Map of Delaware County, Pennsylvania school districts

Wallingford-Swarthmore School District is a midsized, suburban public school district in southeastern Delaware County, Pennsylvania in the United States. It serves the boroughs of Swarthmore, Rose Valley and Rutledge, and the township of Nether Providence (consisting largely of the unincorporated community of Wallingford). It encompasses approximately seven square miles.

The district received more than $16.8 million in state funding in school year 2020–2021.

According to 2018-22 ACS-ED data, the district serves a resident population of 23,149. The median household income is $141,084, versus a state median income of $73,170, and national median income of $75,149. The demographics are 77% White, 9% Asian, 6% Black, 5% Two or more races, and 3% Hispanic.

The school district has one high school, one middle school, and three elementary schools. Wallingford-Swarthmore schools are highly regarded, and the district is one of the best in suburban Philadelphia. Strath Haven High School has won two Blue Ribbons of Excellence, and in 2004 Wallingford Elementary School received one from the state and one from the national government.

== High school ==
=== Strath Haven High School ===
Strath Haven High School is located at 205 South Providence Road, Wallingford. The school currently has 1,140 students in grades 9–12, with 11.1% of students eligible for a free or discounted lunch.

== Middle school ==
=== Strath Haven Middle School ===
Strath Haven Middle School is located at 200 South Providence Road, Wallingford. The school currently has 885 students in grades 6–8, with 13.9% of students eligible for a free or discounted lunch.

Starting in October 2007, SHMS underwent a series of renovations and additions. Phase 1 included the addition of a new classroom building, and Phase 2 included renovation of one of the existing buildings and demolition of the other two existing buildings. Phase 1 opened in April 2009, and Phase 2 opened in May 2010. The other two existing buildings were demolished in time for the 2010–11 school year.

== Elementary schools ==
=== Swarthmore-Rutledge School ===
Swarthmore-Rutledge School is located at 100 College Avenue, Swarthmore. Housed in the old Swarthmore High School, the school serves 551 students in grades K–5 with 11% of students eligible for a free or discounted lunch as of the 2023–2024 school year.

=== Wallingford Elementary School ===
Wallingford Elementary School is located at 20 South Providence Road, Wallingford. The school serves 588 students in grades K-5 with 9% of students eligible for a free or discounted lunch as of the 2023–2024 school year.

Starting in June 2011, WES underwent a series of renovations and expansions, including a new classroom building, gymnasium and library, and renovated offices. The new WES opened in September 2012, in time for the 2012–13 school year.

=== Nether Providence Elementary School ===
Nether Providence Elementary School is located at 410 Moore Road, Wallingford. The school serves 493 students in grades K–5 with 25% of students eligible for a free or discounted lunch as of the 2023–2024 school year.

Starting in spring 2013, NPE underwent a series of renovations and an addition housing a new gym, offices and music suite. Two of the existing buildings were renovated and one demolished. The phased renovation/expansion project opened in January 2015.
