= Gabriel Iglesias =

American comedian and actor (born 1976)

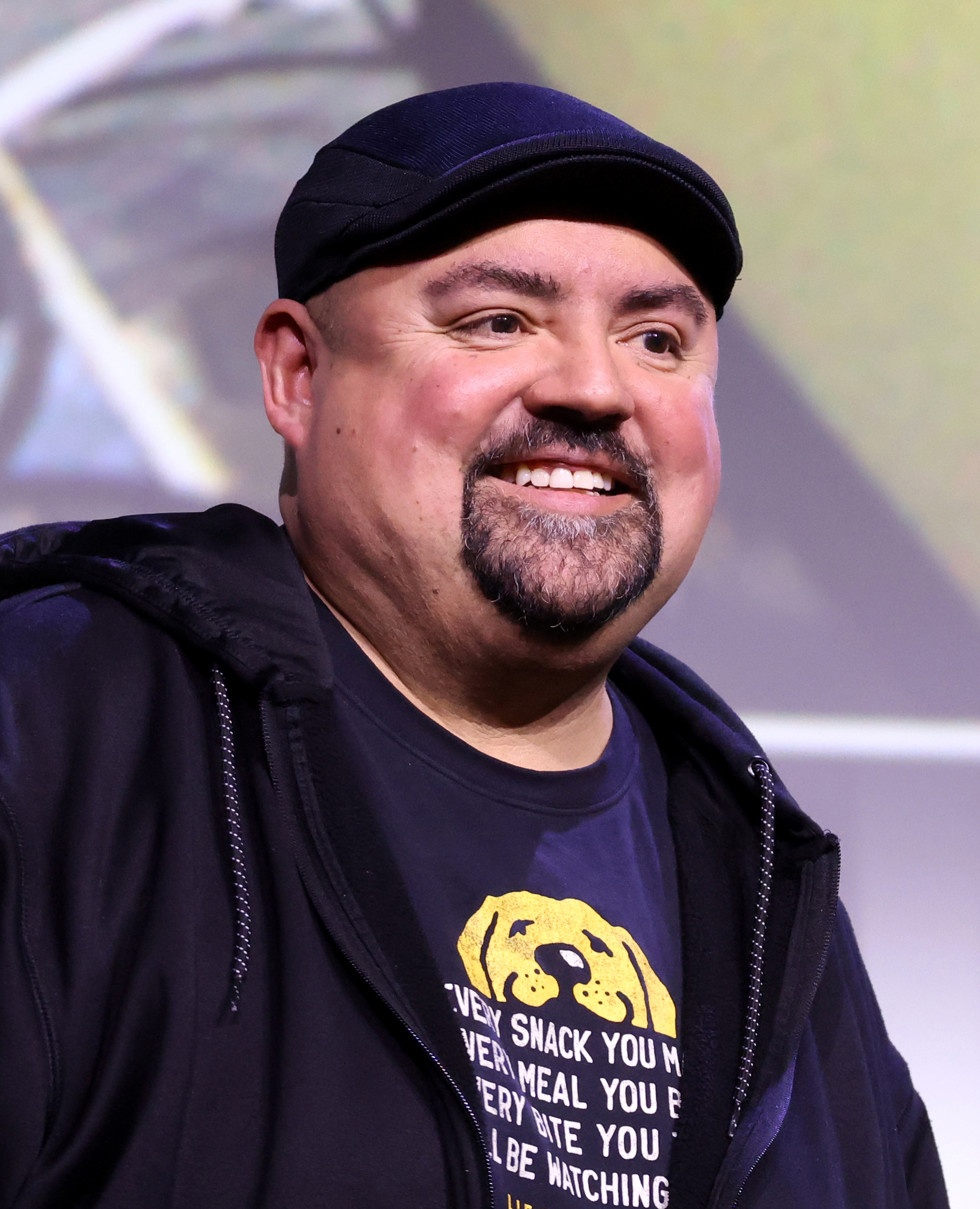
- Iglesias in 2025
- Born: Gabriel Jesús Iglesias; July 15, 1976 (age 50); San Diego, California, U.S.
- Other name: Fluffy
- Occupations: Comedian; actor
- Years active: 1997–present

Comedy career
- Medium: Stand-up; television; film
- Genres: Observational comedy; surreal humour; self-deprecation; impressions; satire
- Subjects: Latin American culture; race relations; obesity; everyday life; pop culture; social awkwardness
- Website: fluffyguy.com

Gabriel Jesús Iglesias (born July 15, 1976), nicknamed Fluffy, is an American stand-up comedian and actor. He has produced a number of stand-up specials for television outlets such as Comedy Central and Netflix, including I'm Not Fat... I'm Fluffy, and Hot and Fluffy. As an actor, he has appeared in numerous live-action and animated TV shows and films, including starring in the sitcom Mr. Iglesias on Netflix, playing Tobias in the 2012 movie Magic Mike and its 2015 sequel, and providing the voice of Speedy Gonzales in Space Jam: A New Legacy. He was also the host of the shows Stand Up Revolution on Comedy Central and Fluffy's Food Adventures on Fuse. In 2018, Iglesias was one of the top 10 highest-paid comedians in the world.

== Early life ==
Iglesias was born July 15, 1976, in San Diego, California, to Esther P. Mendez and Jesús Iglesias. His mother Esther raised him as a single mother. He is of Mexican heritage. He lived in Riverside, Corona, Santa Ana, Baldwin Park, and Compton before settling in Section 8 low-income housing in Long Beach, where Iglesias spent most of his youth.

== Career ==
Iglesias worked for a cell phone company in Los Angeles and in 1997 went into comedy full-time, though it resulted in him being evicted from his home and losing his car.

In 2000, Iglesias appeared in the sixth season of the Nickelodeon sketch comedy series All That, co-starring with Amanda Bynes and Nick Cannon.

Iglesias was a contestant on the fourth season of reality TV series Last Comic Standing in 2006, surviving elimination to become one of the final eight comics. He was disqualified at that point for having used a smuggled BlackBerry to communicate with family and friends, which violated the rules of the show.

In 2007, Iglesias voiced an entire Mexican family in "Padre de Familia", a sixth season episode of the Fox TV animated comedy Family Guy. That same year, he began voicing a recurring set of identical twin characters on The Emperor's New School, a Disney animated series that he describes as his favorite voice work.

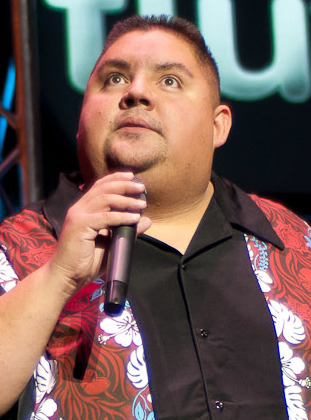
Iglesias in November 2010

In 2011, Comedy Central debuted Gabriel Iglesias Presents Stand Up Revolution, a stand-up series that Iglesias produced and hosted, running for three seasons before ending in 2014.

Iglesias hosted/co-hosted six episodes of Equals Three, and played a strip club DJ and drug dealer in the 2012 film Magic Mike.

Iglesias voiced Ned and Zed in the 2013 DisneyToon Studios film, Planes. He also voiced characters in the animated films The Nut Job (2014) and El Americano: The Movie (2016).

Iglesias is featured in the reality series Fluffy Breaks Even, which premiered on Fuse on October 1, 2015. The show was renamed Fluffy's Food Adventures upon its third season renewal in January 2017. From 2019 to 2020, he played Gabe Iglesias, in Mr. Iglesias, a Netflix original series about a teacher at Woodrow Wilson High School in Long Beach, California. In 2021, he voiced the character of Speedy Gonzales in the film Space Jam: A New Legacy and Picchu in Maya and the Three.

In 2022, Iglesias was the first comedian to sell out Dodger Stadium in Los Angeles. The concert was released to Netflix on October 18, 2022, as Stadium Fluffy.

In 2025, Iglesias performed in Saudi Arabia's Riyadh Comedy Festival, an event taking place from September 26th to October 9th. Iglesias performed on October 1st, the day before the seventh anniversary of the assassination of Jamal Khashoggi. Joey Shea, Saudi Arabia researcher at Human Rights Watch, said in a statement that the Saudi government is using the comedy festival to whitewash its human rights abuses. Iglesias has performed in the region before, having spoken about performing in Saudi Arabia during his 2013 set "Aloha Fluffy: Live from Hawaii."

On March 21, 2026 he and comedian Jo Koy co-hosted a comedy show at SoFi Stadium in Los Angeles. It was the largest crowd in history ever to see a stand-up comedy show.

Iglesias appeared at the 52nd American Music Awards.

== Influences and style ==
Iglesias' comedy influences are Paul Rodriguez, Eddie Murphy, Robin Williams, and Bill Cosby. He is known for his trademark Hawaiian shirts.

Iglesias often references his weight in his comedy. One of his most well-known sayings is "I'm not fat, I'm fluffy", which he proves by explaining the different "levels" of fatness. The five original levels, according to Iglesias, are "Big", "Healthy", "Husky", "Fluffy", and "DAMN!". A sixth level ("Oh, hell no!") was added in 2009, following its perceived discovery in Las Cruces.

Regarding how novice comedians can widen their fan base, Iglesias stated in a January 2016 interview:

In the beginning, work as clean as you possibly can and stay away from topics that could be controversial or offensive. For example, don't talk about politics, don't talk about religion. Stay away from sports. Talk about things that are relatable to everyone. The more relatability you have, the bigger the fan base you're going to have.

== Awards and honors ==
On February 10, 2012, Iglesias was presented with several awards by the city of El Paso, Texas, including the key to the city and the Beacon of H.O.P.E Award from the nonprofit organization Operation H.O.P.E. On March 12, 2025, Iglesias had his handprints and signature cemented at Grauman's Chinese Theater. On March 3, 2026, he received a star on the Hollywood Walk of Fame.

== Personal life ==
=== Relationships ===
Since 2010, Iglesias has lived in Whittier, California. He was in a long-term relationship with Claudia Valdez, with whom he has a self-proclaimed stepson named Frankie whom he calls his son, despite not legally adopting him. According to a June 2020 People article, he and Valdez broke up in 2017, which led him to cancel some performances, and to quit drinking for two years. Despite the breakup, he still maintains a close relationship with Frankie, whom he helped raise.

=== Religion ===
In a 2024 interview with Neal Brennan, Iglesias stated that he did not grow up with a specific religion despite his family being originally Roman Catholic, since his mother held syncretist beliefs regarding religion—for example displaying crucifixes and images of the Virgin Mary alongside Buddha and Ganesh statues and wearing a Star of David necklace. He remained uncatechized and mostly uninvolved in organized religion during his upbringing, occasionally going to church on a friend's invite but ultimately shaping his moral framework based on his mother's guidance and personal experiences.

=== Health ===
In The Fluffy Movie, Iglesias describes how at his heaviest, which he states was 445 pounds (202 kilograms), he was diagnosed with type 2 diabetes, and with his blood sugar spiking to over 300 mg/dl (16.6 mmol/L) regularly, was given two years to live by his doctor. He said the shock of being told this had prompted him to reevaluate how he took care of himself and explained that he decided to lose weight to ensure his continued presence in the lives of his family. Iglesias described the struggle to incorporate a healthier lifestyle, relating how he was told by a specialist that his heavy touring schedule precluded him from being a candidate for bariatric surgery, and how he instead resorted to weight-lifting, Diamond Dallas Page Yoga, and a high-protein, low-carbohydrate diet, which helped him shed over 100 pounds (45 kilograms). Iglesias has also struggled with depression and alcoholism, which he attributes partly to burnout from his heavy touring schedule.

On July 15, 2021, his 45th birthday, he tested positive for COVID-19, and canceled his remaining shows at the Tobin Center for the Performing Arts as well as the taping of his upcoming comedy special.

In his 2022 TV special Gabriel Iglesias: Stadium Fluffy, Iglesias further detailed that he lost another 70 pounds (32 kilograms) in 2020 due to the lockdowns brought on by the COVID-19 pandemic.

== Filmography ==
=== Film ===
†	Denotes productions that have not yet been released

Year	Title	Role	Notes
2002	Entre vivos y plebeyos	Piarta	Short film
2003	El Matador	Gabe	
2004	Days of Santiago	Coquero	
2006	The Surfer King	Aokee	
2012	Magic Mike	Tobias	
2013	Planes	Ned and Zed	Voice
2014	The Nut Job	Jimmy	Voice
2014	A Haunted House 2	Miguel	
2014	The Fluffy Movie	Himself	comedy film
2014	The Book of Life	Pepe Rodríguez	Voice
2015	Magic Mike XXL	Tobias	
2016	Norm of the North	Pablo and Stan	Voice
2016	El Americano: The Movie	García	Voice
2017	Smurfs: The Lost Village	Jokey Smurf	Voice
2017	The Nut Job 2: Nutty by Nature	Jimmy	Voice
2017	Coco	Clerk	Voice
2017	The Star	Rufus	Voice
2017	Ferdinand	Cuatro	Voice
2018	Show Dogs	Sprinkles	Voice
2019	UglyDolls	Babo	Voice
2021	Space Jam: A New Legacy	Speedy Gonzales	Voice
2022	Paws of Fury: The Legend of Hank	Chuck	Voice
2023	Diary of a Wimpy Kid Christmas: Cabin Fever	Officer Vasquez	Voice
2025	Dora and the Search for Sol Dorado	Boots	Voice
2026	Daffy Season	Speedy Gonzales	Voice; short film

=== Television ===
Year	Title	Role	Notes
2000	All That	Himself/Various characters	13 episodes
2002	My Wife and Kids	Nabu	Episode: "Table for Too Many"
2002–2003	The USO Comedy Tour	Himself	Stand-up special; Episode unknown
2003	Comedy Central Presents	Himself	Stand-up special; season 7, episode 1
2006	Last Comic Standing	Himself (contestant)	4 episodes
2006–2008	The Emperor's New School	Additional voices	Voice; 4 episodes
2007	Gabriel Iglesias: Hot and Fluffy	Himself	Stand-up special
2007	Family Guy	Mexican No. 5	Voice; episode: "Padre de Familia"
2009	Gabriel Iglesias: I'm Not Fat... I'm Fluffy	Himself	Stand-up special
2011-2012	Equals Three	Himself (host)	3 episodes
2011–2014	Gabriel Iglesias Presents Stand Up Revolution	Himself (host)	19 episodes; also creator, writer, executive producer
2012	The High Fructose Adventures of Annoying Orange	Chicken/Krazy Klaus/Mr. Cash/Smash/Mr. Juicy Fun	Voice; 3 episodes
2013	Gabriel Iglesias: Aloha Fluffy	Himself	Stand-up special
2013	Key & Peele	Himself	Episode: "Joke Stealing"
2014	Scooby-Doo! Ghastly Goals	Professor Perez	Voice; television special
2014	Gabriel Iglesias Presents Rick Gutierrez: I'm Not Mad. I'm Just a Parent	Himself	Television special
2014–2015	Cristela	Alberto	13 episodes
2015–2017	Fluffy's Food Adventures	Himself (host)	20 episodes; also creator, writer, executive producer
2016	Ice Age: The Great Egg-Scapade	Cholly Bear	Voice; television special
2016	Gabriel Iglesias: I'm Sorry For What I Said While I Was Hungry	Himself	Stand-up special
2017	Narcos	Dominican Gangster	Episode: "The Cali KGB"
2017–2019	Funny You Should Ask	Himself	35 episodes
2018	Modern Family	Jorge	Episode: "Daddy Issues"
2019	Gabriel Iglesias: One Show Fits All	Himself	Stand-up special
2019–2020	Mr. Iglesias	Gabe Iglesias	21 episodes; also executive producer
2020	Unleashed	Himself (host)	10 episodes; also executive producer
2021	Ridiculousness	Himself (guest)	Episode: "Gabriel Iglesias"
2021	Monsters at Work	Gary	Voice; 2 episodes
2021	Hell's Kitchen	Himself	Chef's table guest diner in the blue kitchen; episode: "More Than a Sticky Situation"
2021	Maya and the Three	Picchu	Voice; 4 episodes
2022	Gabriel Iglesias: Stadium Fluffy	Himself	Stand-up special
2022	StoryBots: Answer Time	Mr. Karate Guy	Episode: "Dizzy"
2023	The Santa Clauses	Kris Kringle	Main cast; season 2
2023	Barmageddon	Himself	Episode: "Gabriel Iglesias vs. Jelly Roll"
2024	WWE Rivals	Himself (host)	Season 4
2024	Pupstruction	Felipe	Voice; episode: "The Friendliest Frog"
2024–2025	Primos	Tio Gustavo	Voice; recurring role
2024–present	Everybody Still Hates Chris	Romeo	Voice; episode: "Everybody Still Hates Drew's Brother"
2024	American Dad!	Vicente	Voice; episode: "Touch the Sun: A Chimborazo Adventure"
2025	Gabriel Iglesias: Legend of Fluffy	Himself	Stand-up special
2025	Krapopolis	Pandosia	Voice; episode: "Mazed and Kingfused"

== Discography ==
- Hot and Fluffy (2008) Image Entertainment
- I'm Not Fat, I'm Fluffy (2009)
- We Luv Fluffy (2009)
- Aloha Fluffy (2013) Comedy Central
- I'm Sorry For What I Said While I Was Hungry (2016) Netflix
- One Show Fits All (2019) Netflix
- Stadium Fluffy (2022) Netflix
- The Legend of Fluffy (2025) Netflix
