= Rutledge, Pennsylvania =

Borough in Pennsylvania, US

- Borough
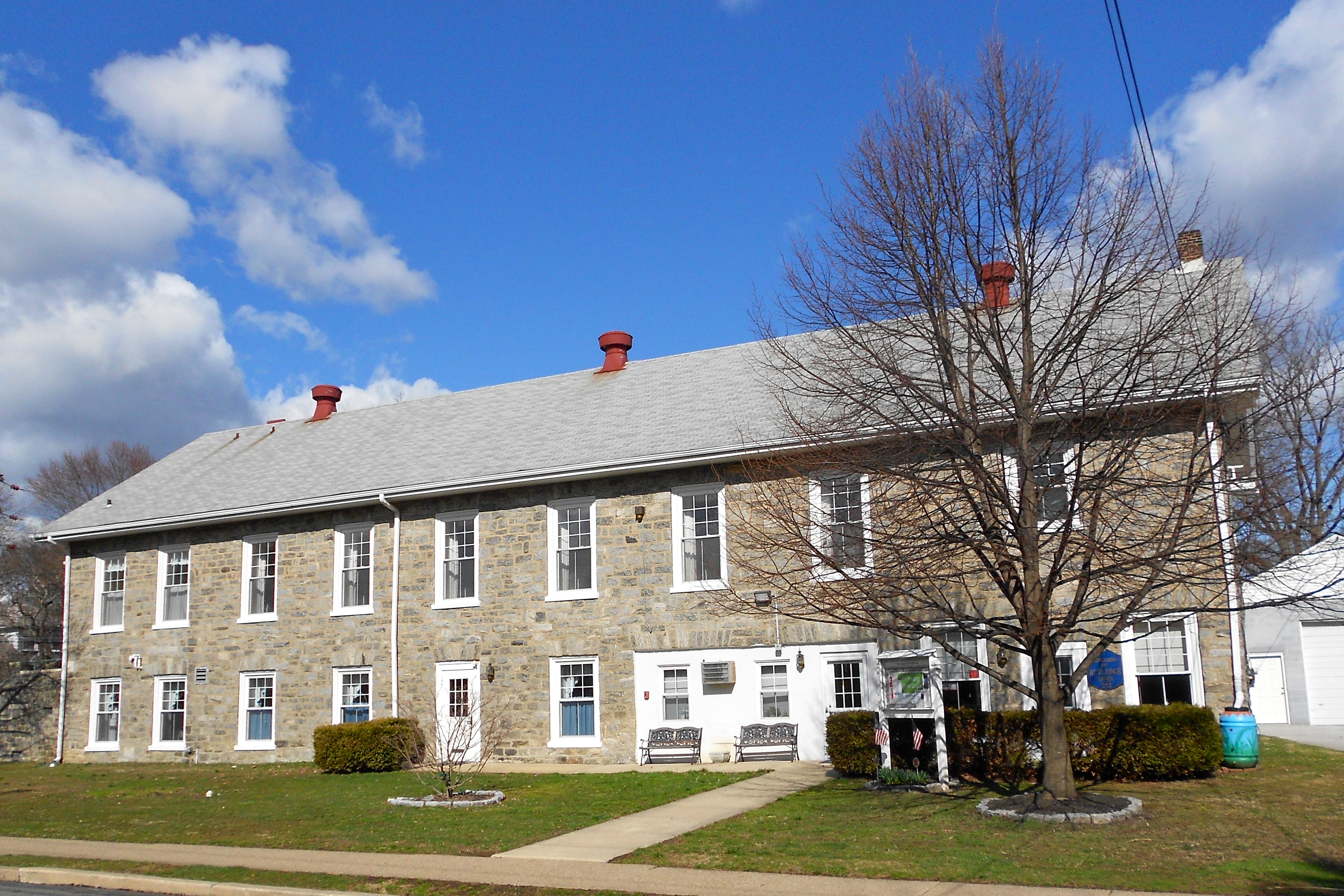
- Borough Hall

- Location in Delaware County and the U.S. state of Pennsylvania

- Location of Rutledge in Pennsylvania Rutledge (the United States)
- Coordinates: 39°54′03″N 75°19′39″W
- Country: United States
- State: Pennsylvania
- County: Delaware

Government
  - Mayor: Gamal Sherif

Area
  - Total: 0.14 sq mi (0.37 km^{2})
  - Land: 0.14 sq mi (0.37 km^{2})
  - Water: 0 sq mi (0.00 km^{2})
- Elevation: 128 ft (39 m)

Population (2020)
  - Total: 782
  - Estimate (2022): 778
  - Density: 5,587.9/sq mi (2,157.51/km^{2})
- Time zone: UTC-5 (EST)
  - Summer (DST): UTC-4 (EDT)
- ZIP code: 19070
- Area codes: 610 and 484
- FIPS code: 42-045-66928
- FIPS code: 42-66928
- GNIS feature ID: 1204564
- Website: www.rutledgepa.org

Rutledge is a borough in Delaware County, Pennsylvania, United States. The population was 782 at the 2020 census, down from 860 at the 2000 census.

== History ==
Rutledge was founded in 1885 by a group of Philadelphia businessmen, and incorporated as a borough in 1887. A promotional brochure produced in 1897 described the community as follows:

"Located ten miles from Philadelphia, on the Central Division line of the Philadelphia, Wilmington and Baltimore Railroad, and a three-minute walk from Morton Station, it could be reached in 20 to 30 minutes by 21 trains daily. To the west lies Swarthmore College, while the Delaware River hree miles to the southeast. Its school was described as one of the finest in the county; its houses were neat and attractive, and their owners took pride in their homes and the landscaping of their grounds."

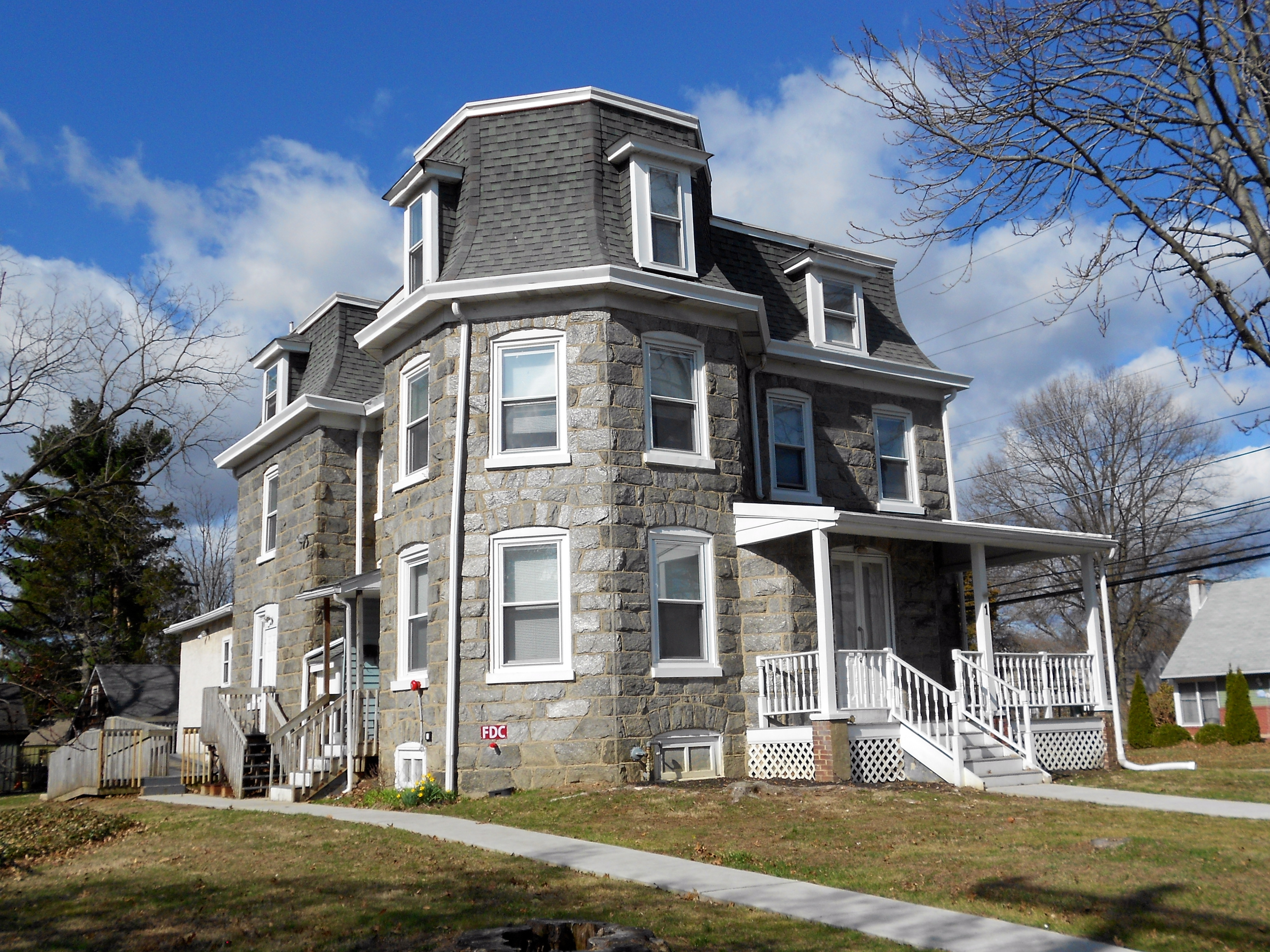
House in Rutledge built 1900

Since then, there have been a few name changes. The train line is SEPTA's Media/Wawa Line, which provides 26 trains on weekdays from Philadelphia to what is now called the Morton-Rutledge Station. But in many ways, this description still holds true today. The schools in the Wallingford-Swarthmore School District are among the finest in the state, and the homes, many of them dating back to the late 19th century, are still kept with pride by their owners.

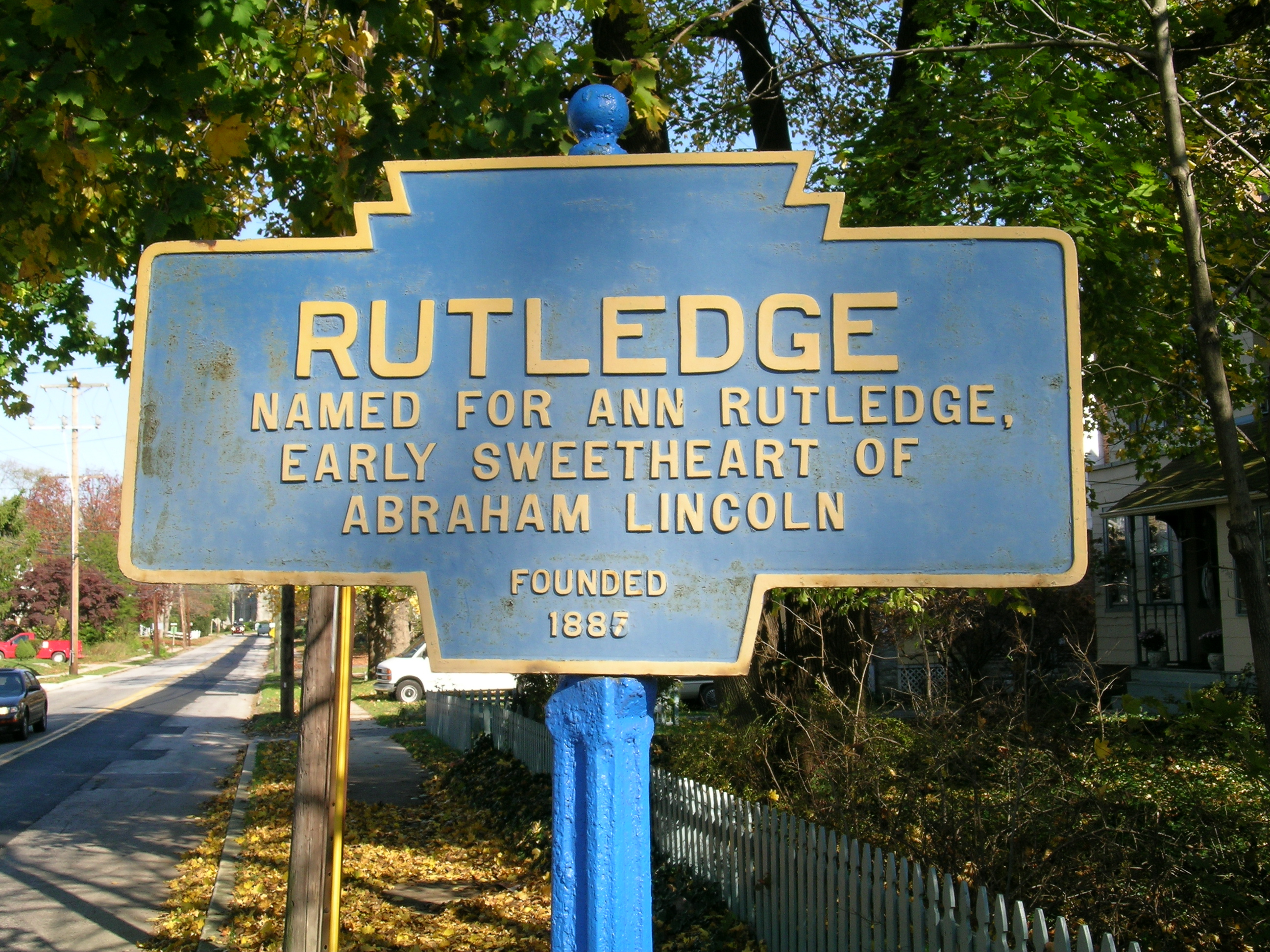
Keystone Marker perpetuating the myth that the borough was named after Ann Rutledge

There is a long-standing legend that the borough was named after Ann Rutledge, the first-love of Abraham Lincoln. This erroneous story is perpetuated in the Keystone Marker that greets those approaching Rutledge from the south on Morton Avenue. The actual story, according to the founders' brochure, is that the town was named after a then-popular romantic novel Rutledge written by Miriam Coles Harris published in 1860. However, the site of what is now Rutledge borough was once a section of land on the estate of Edward Rutledge, who served as a delegate to the Continental Congress from South Carolina and was the youngest signer of the Declaration of Independence.

In 1958, George Raymond, the president of the NAACP Chester branch, purchased a house in Rutledge. The day before he was to move in, a fire burned down the house. After the fire, the township attempted to exercise eminent domain and claim Raymond's property as a site for a new town hall. Raymond threatened legal action and the township backed down. The house was rebuilt and Raymond took residence in the house in 1959.

== Geography ==
Rutledge is located in eastern Delaware County at 39°54′3″N 75°19′39″W (39.900812, -75.327404). It is nearly surrounded by Ridley Township, with the northernmost tip of the borough touching the borough of Morton. The unincorporated community of Folsom in Ridley Township borders Rutledge to the south.

According to the United States Census Bureau, Rutledge has a total area of 0.14 square miles (0.37 km^{2}), all land.

Triangle Park, a children's park, is located in the borough. Morton-Rutledge Fire Company in Morton serves as its fire department. Rutledge is served by the Swarthmore Police Department.

== Demographics ==
Historical population
Census	Pop.	Note	%±
1890	269		—
1900	369		37.2%
1910	523		41.7%
1920	711		35.9%
1930	789		11.0%
1940	796		0.9%
1950	919		15.5%
1960	947		3.0%
1970	1,167		23.2%
1980	934		−20.0%
1990	843		−9.7%
2000	860		2.0%
2010	784		−8.8%
2020	782		−0.3%

As of Census 2010, the racial makeup of the borough was 91.7% White, 2.9% African American, 3.1% Asian, and 2.3% from two or more races. Hispanic or Latino of any race were 1.8% of the population .

As of the census of 2000, there were 860 people, 297 households, and 217 families residing in the borough. The population density was 6,410.8 inhabitants per square mile (2,475.2/km^{2}). There were 305 housing units at an average density of 2,273.6 units per square mile (877.8 units/km^{2}).

There were 297 households, out of which 40.1% had children under the age of 18 living with them, 61.3% were married couples living together, 9.1% had a female householder with no husband present, and 26.6% were non-families. 22.2% of all households were made up of individuals, and 10.1% had someone living alone who was 65 years of age or older. The average household size was 2.87 and the average family size was 3.44.

The population was spread out, with 30.3% under the age of 18, 7.0% from 18 to 24, 27.6% from 25 to 44, 23.6% from 45 to 64, and 11.5% who were 65 years of age or older. The median age was 38 years. For every 100 females, there were 96.3 males. For every 100 females age 18 and over, there were 87.2 males.

The median income for a household in the borough was $80,972, and the median income for a family was $90,333. Males had a median income of $46,500 versus $33,281 for females. The per capita income for the borough was $51,800. About 4.1% of families and 5.3% of the population were below the poverty line, including 2.7% of those under age 18 and 12.1% of those age 65 or over.

== Education ==
Rutledge lies within the Wallingford-Swarthmore School District. Public school children in the borough attend Swarthmore-Rutledge School for grades K–5, Strath Haven Middle School for grades 6–8, and Strath Haven High School for grades 9–12. Rutledge originally had its own one-school district, which was located in the current borough building. The Rutledge and Swarthmore School Districts merged in 1955.

== Transportation ==
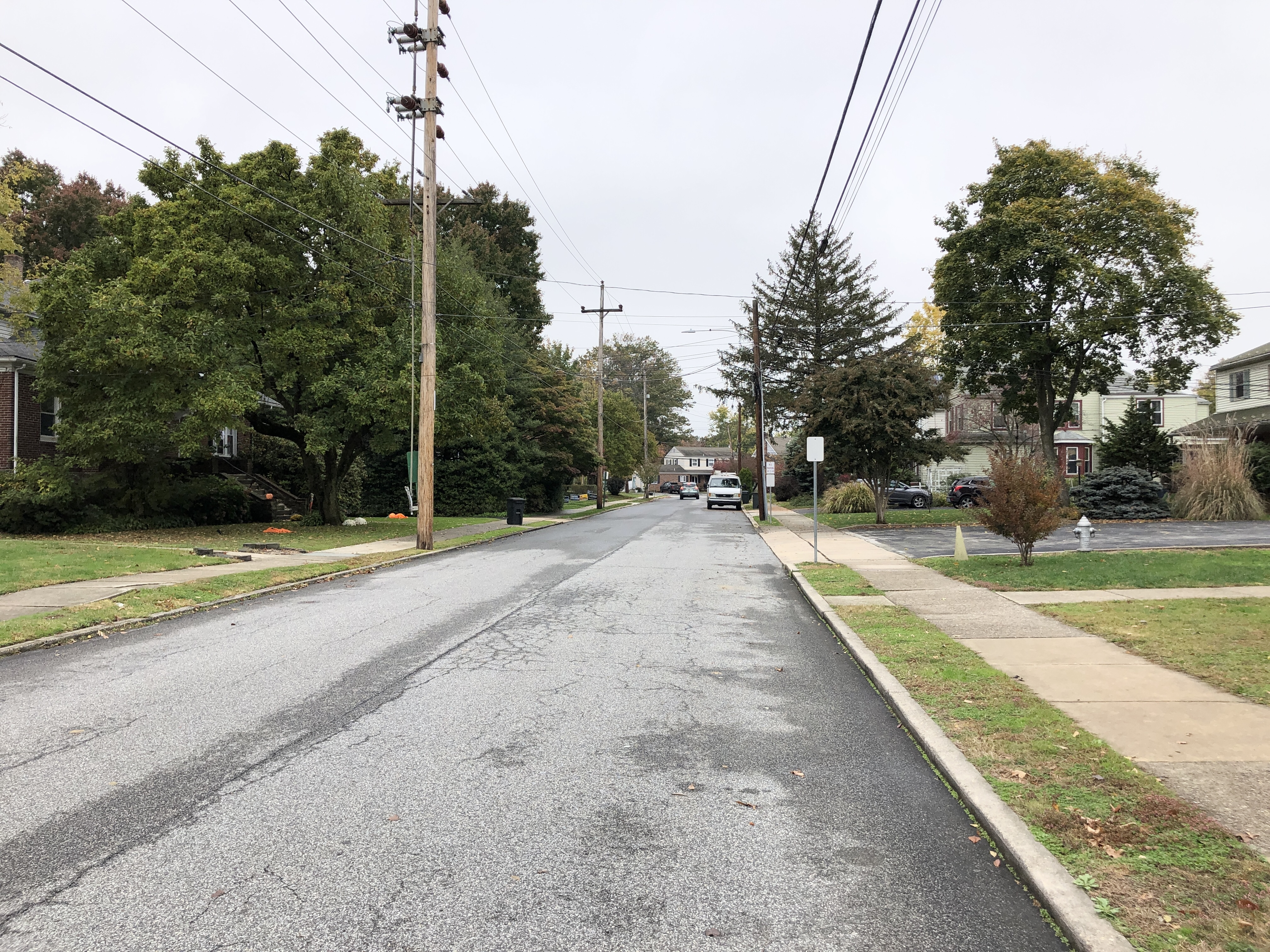
Sylvan Avenue in Rutledge

As of 2008, there were 3.33 miles (5.36 km) of public roads in Rutledge, of which 0.43 miles (0.69 km) were maintained by the Pennsylvania Department of Transportation (PennDOT) and 2.90 miles (4.67 km) were maintained by the borough.

No numbered highways serve Rutledge directly. Main thoroughfares in the borough include Morton Avenue, which follows a southwest-to-northeast alignment along Rutledge's northwestern border, and Sylvan Avenue, which follows a northwest-to-southeast alignment through the heart of the borough.
