= Wallingford, Pennsylvania =

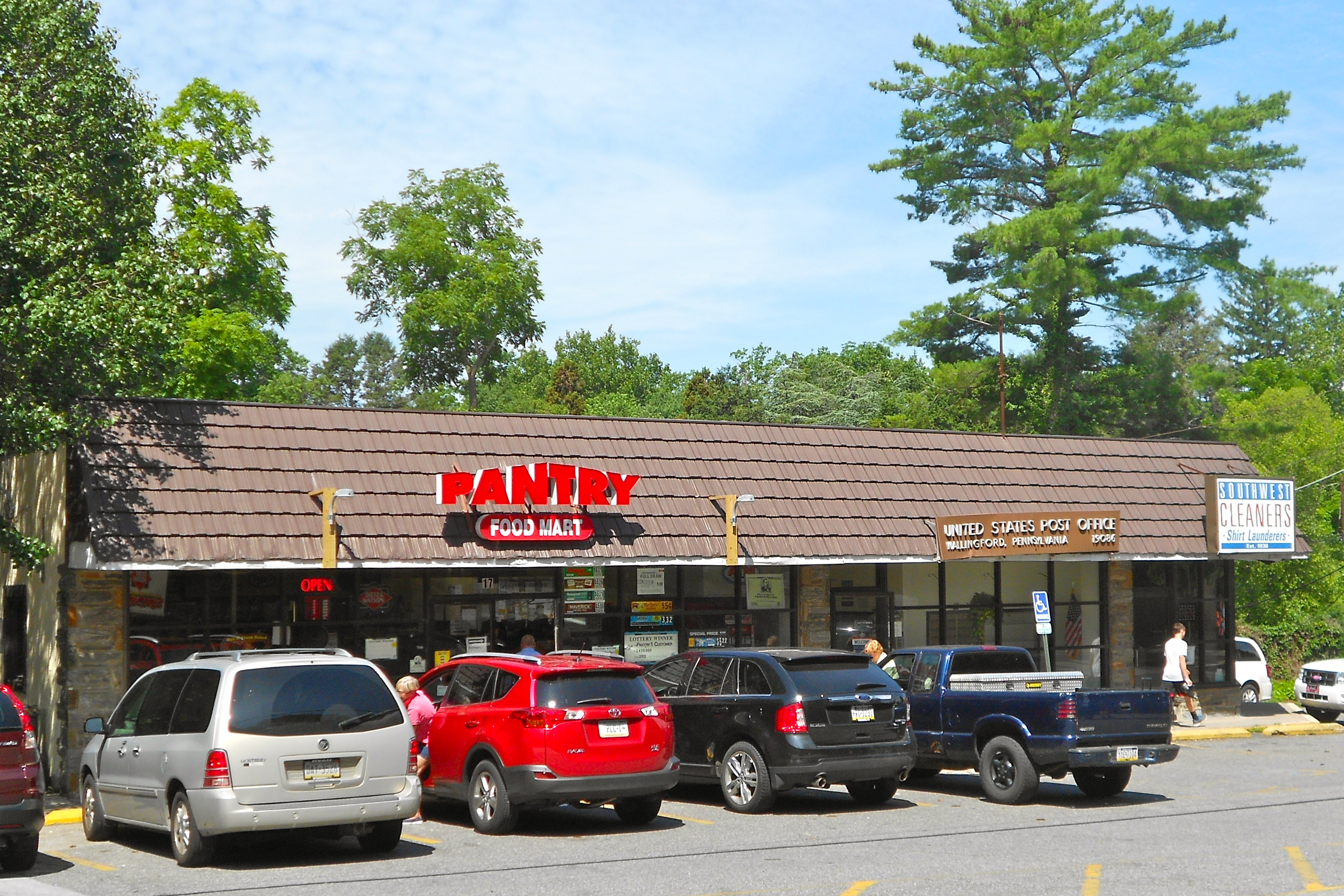
- Wallingford post office

- Location of Wallingford in Pennsylvania Wallingford, Pennsylvania (the United States)
- Coordinates: 39°53′27″N 75°21′47″W
- Country: United States
- State: Pennsylvania
- County: Delaware
- Township: Nether Providence
- Elevation: 131 ft (40 m)
- Time zone: UTC-5 (EST)
  - Summer (DST): UTC-4 (EDT)
- ZIP Code: 19086
- Area codes: 484 and 610
- Website: www.netherprovidence.org

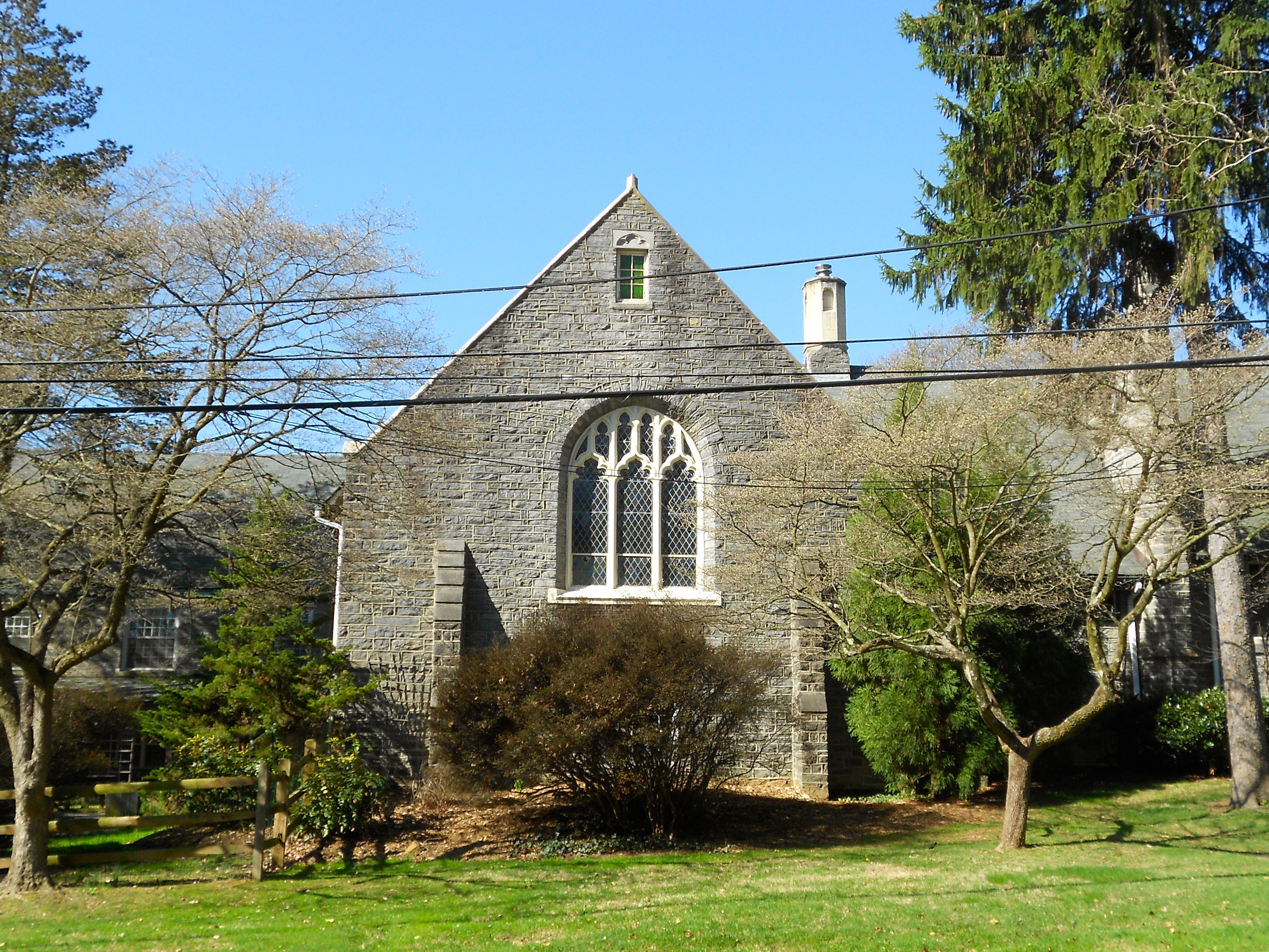
Wallingford Presbyterian Church

Wallingford is an unincorporated community in Nether Providence Township, Delaware County, Pennsylvania, United States. Founded in 1687, it is named for Wallingford, England. In 2007, Wallingford was named by Money Magazine as the ninth best place to live in the United States; two other towns in the area made the top 15. Most locations in Nether Providence use Wallingford's ZIP code.

It is west of Interstate 476, known locally as the Blue Route, and east of S. Providence Road, PA 252. Crum Creek forms the township's eastern border with the borough of Swarthmore. Wallingford lies north of Chester on the southwestern edge of the Philadelphia urban area. Wallingford is about 9 miles from Philadelphia.

There is a dry cleaning shop and a post office. Various doctors, dentists, and lawyers are also located in Wallingford.

About half a dozen churches and chapels of several denominations are located in Wallingford, including Wallingford Presbyterian Church, St. John Chrysostom Catholic Church on Providence Road and the Foundry Church, near Media Parkway. Wallingford is also home to Congregation Ohev Shalom, a conservative synagogue located at the corner of Rt. 252 and Rt. 320.

The local school district is the Wallingford-Swarthmore School District, which serves Wallingford, Swarthmore, Rutledge, Rose Valley, and the rest of Nether Providence township.

Wallingford is located along SEPTA's Media/Wawa Line, and has a station whose design is attributed to the well-known Victorian architect Frank Furness. Wallingford is about 30 minutes from center city Philadelphia by rail.

The township's municipal offices are located at 214 Sykes Lane.

The Thomas Leiper Estate, Westlawn and Wolley Stille are listed on the National Register of Historic Places.

== Demographics ==
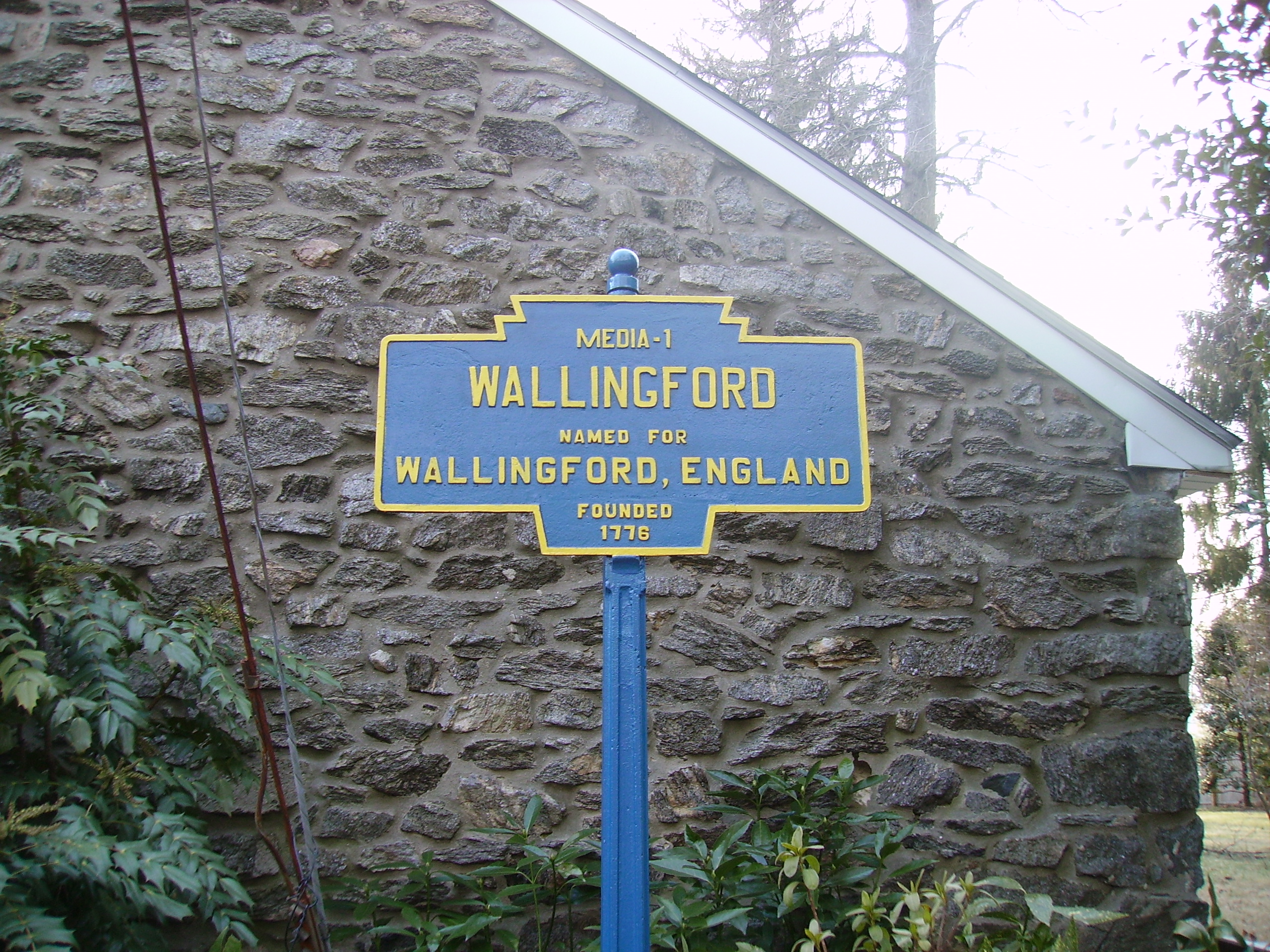
Keystone marker on Providence Road

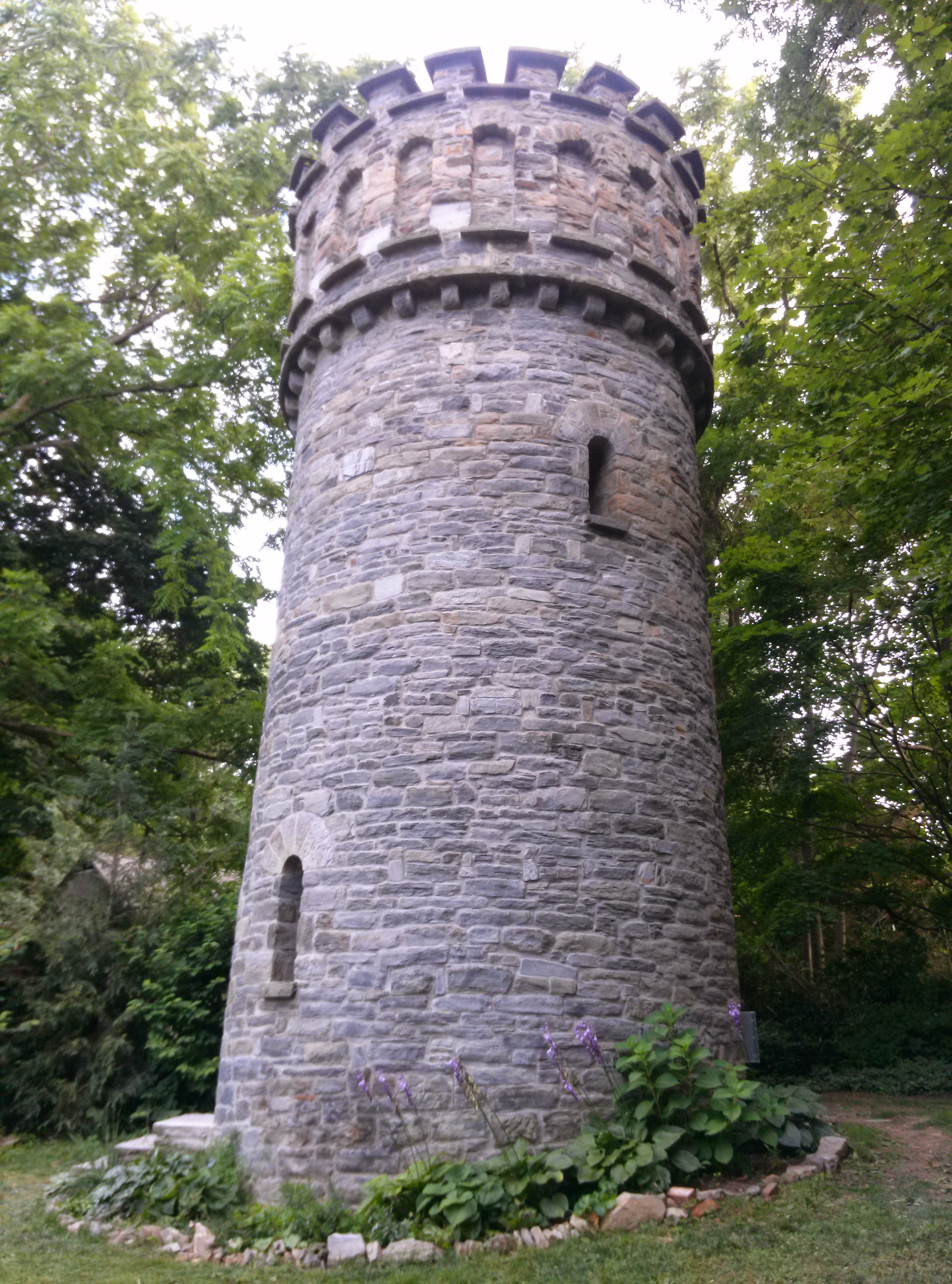
The tower on the grounds of Wallingford's Community Arts Center

As of the census of 2010, there were 11,420 people residing in Zip Code Tabulation Area 19086. The population density was 3,095 people per square mile. There were 4,487 housing units. The racial makeup of the community was 90.03% White, 4.57% African American, 0.55% Native American, 5.07% Asian, 0.09% Pacific Islander. 1.95% of the population were Hispanic or Latino of any race. The median age was 44.5 years. The median income for a household in the town was $100,660.

== Points of interest ==
- Pendle Hill Quaker Center for Study and Contemplation
- Taylor Memorial Arboretum
- Community Arts Center
- Saint John Chrysostom R.C.

== Education ==
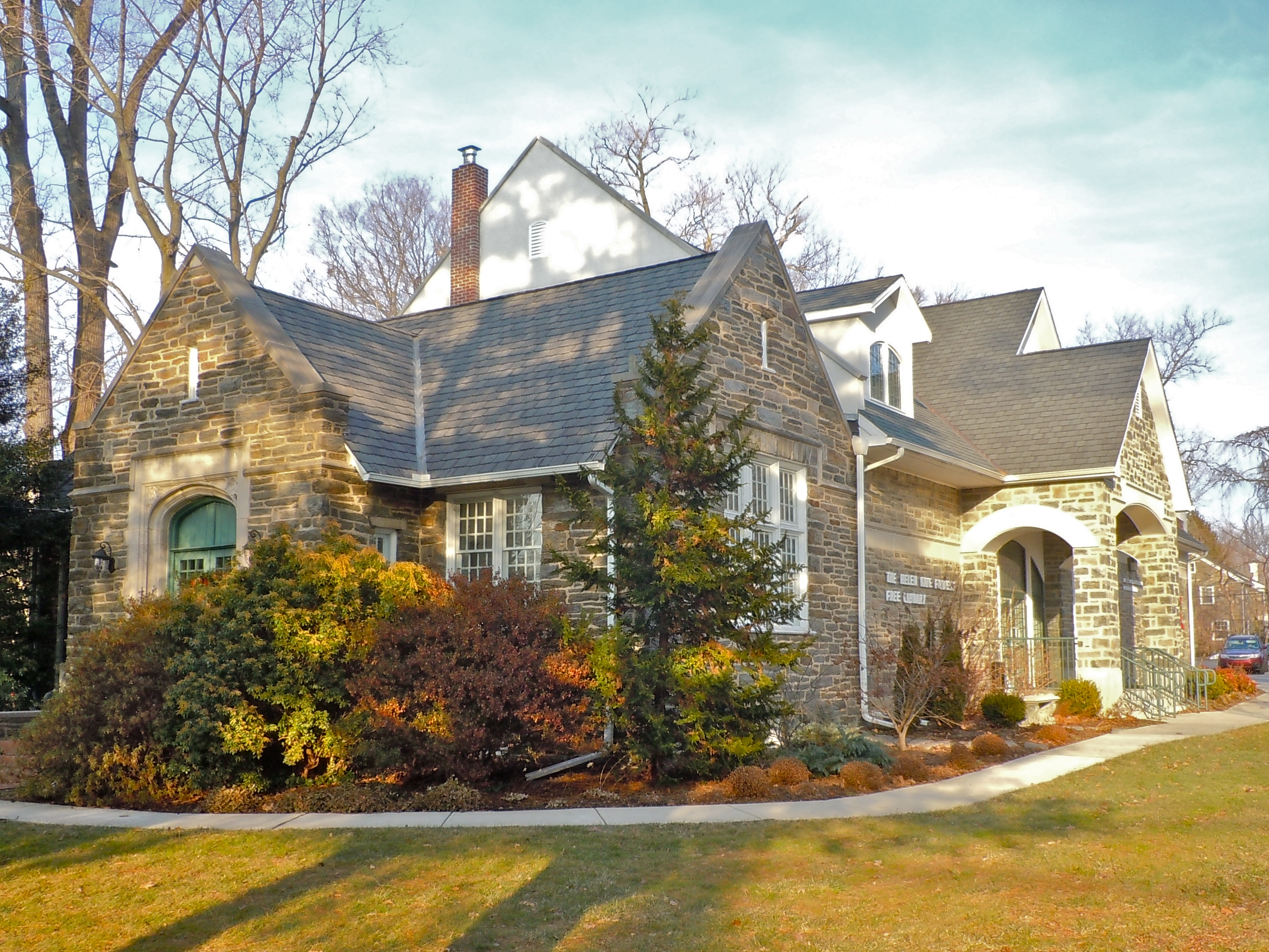
Furness Free Library

Wallingford-Swarthmore School District is the area school district. The first area school started in 1810 and was built on a portion of a 78-acre (32 ha) land grant of farmer and friend of William Penn. Nether Providence School District was formed in 1856; it merged with the Swarthmore School District to become the Wallingford-Swarthmore School District but retained both the Nether Providence and Swarthmore High Schools. In 1984, the middle and high schools merged to become Strath Haven Middle School and Strath Haven High School.

Mother of Providence Regional Catholic School is the area Catholic school. It formed in 2012 from a merger of St. John Chrysostom in Wallingford and Nativity BVM School in Media. Originally Nativity BVM was to be the location of the merged school, but St. John Chrystosom appealed and the archdiocese changed its decision.

Located in Wallingford is the Helen Kate Furness Free Library, founded in 1902 and renovated in 2006.

== Climate ==
Wallingford has a humid subtropical climate (Cfa) and average monthly temperatures range from 33.0 °F in January to 77.9 °F in July. The hardiness zone is 7a.

== Notable people ==
- Edward Potts Cheyney (1861–1947), American historical and economic writer
- Jay Clayton, chairman of the SEC
- Dan Connor (born 1985), former American football linebacker
- Ida Dixon (1854–1916), American golf course architect
- Horace Howard Furness (1833–1912), Shakespearean scholar
- William Henry Furness III (1866–1920), physician and ethnographer
- Caroline Furness Jayne (1873–1909), ethnologist
- Horace Jayne (1859–1913), zoologist and educator
- Horace H. F. Jayne (1898–1975), museum director
- Mark Jones (born 1980), former American football wide receiver
- Joe Sestak, US Representative who served most of Delaware County from 2007 to 2010
- Annis Lee Wister (1830–1908), translator of German to English popular novels

== Neighborhoods ==
- Pendlehill
- Avonbrook
- Moylan
- South Media
- Wallingford Summit
- South Summit
- Wallingford
- South Wallingford
- East Wallingford
- Bowling Green
- Pine Ridge
- Heatherwold
- Garden City
