= Thomson Avenue station =

Thomson Av
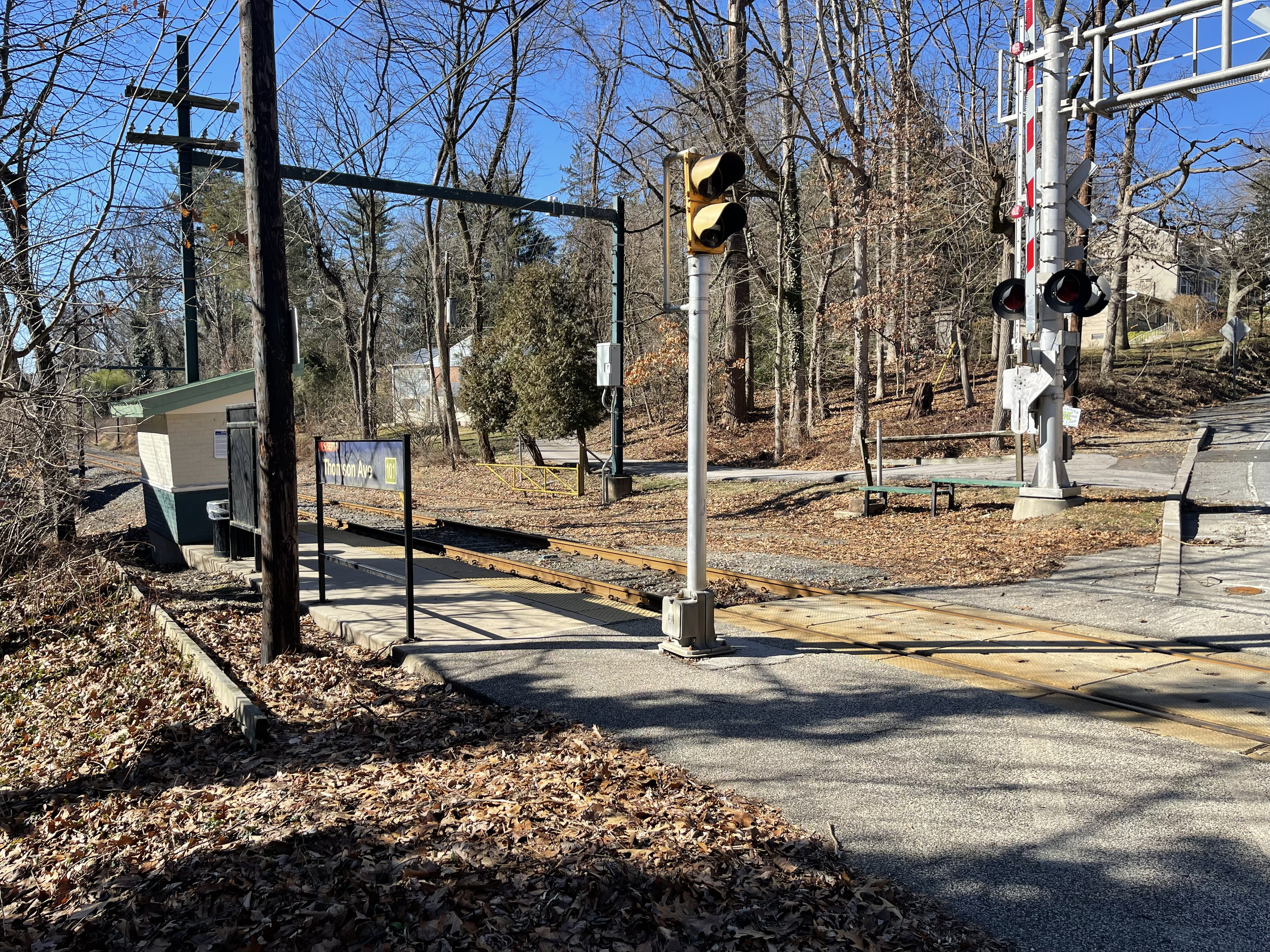

General information
- Location: Thomson Avenue near Sidman Drive; Springfield, Pennsylvania.
- Coordinates: 39.9211°N 75.3455°W
- Owner: SEPTA
- Platforms: 1 side platform
- Tracks: 1

Construction
- Structure type: Open shed
- Parking: No
- Accessible: No

History
- Electrified: Overhead lines

Services
Preceding station	SEPTA Metro	Following station
Springfield Mall toward Orange Street/Media	D (SEPTA Metro)	Woodland Avenue toward 69th Street T.C.
Location

Thomson Avenue station is a stop on the D in Springfield Township, Delaware County, Pennsylvania. It is officially located near Thomson Avenue and Sidman Drive. The platform and shed are located on the south side of Thomson Avenue.

Trolleys arriving at this station travel between 69th Street Transit Center in Upper Darby Township, Pennsylvania and Orange Street in Media, Pennsylvania. The station has a shed with a roof where people can go inside when it is raining. This shed is a traditional "Red Arrow" shed located in an area that's both wooded and residential. Because of this, no parking is available at this station. Trailheads for Thomson Park are located near the station. Thomson Avenue climbs a hill on the west side of this stop as it prepares to terminate at Springfield Hospital on Sproul Road (PA 320), which has a stop of its own at Springfield Mall.
