= Springfield Mall =

Springfield Mall may refer to:

- Springfield Mall (Pennsylvania), a shopping center in Springfield Township, Delaware County, Pennsylvania in the United States
- Springfield Mall (SEPTA Route 101 station), a station on the SEPTA Route 101 trolley line adjacent to the Springfield Mall in Springfield, Pennsylvania
- Springfield Mall (Virginia), a shopping center in Springfield, Virginia in the United States
- Springfield Mall, a fictional mall in the US TV series The Simpsons
