= Woodland Avenue station =

Woodland Av
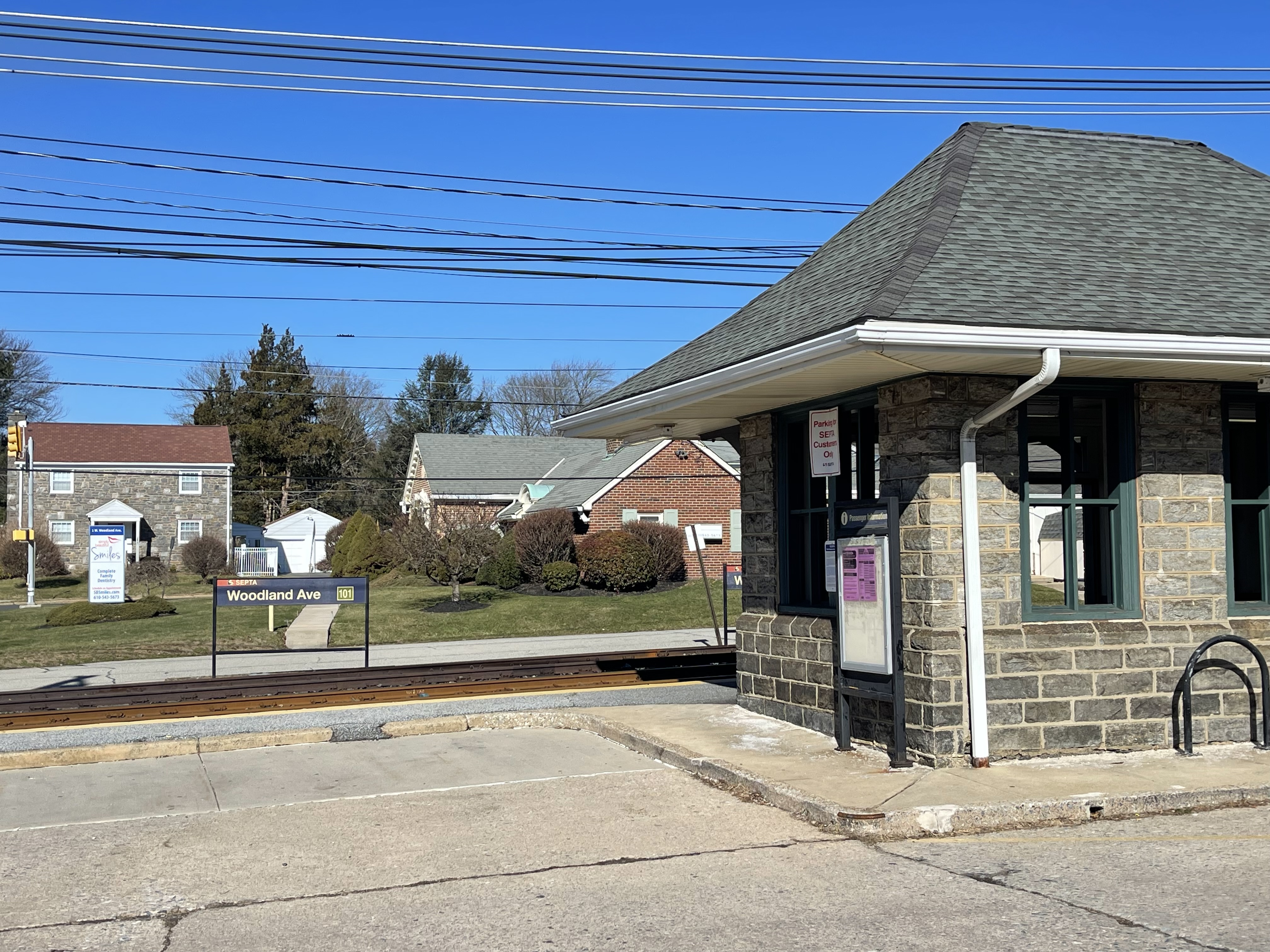

General information
- Location: Woodland Avenue & Rolling Road; Springfield, Pennsylvania.
- Coordinates: 39.92474°N 75.33961°W
- Owner: SEPTA
- Platforms: 1 side platform
- Tracks: 2 (1 storage)

Construction
- Structure type: Brick shelter
- Accessible: No

History
- Electrified: Overhead lines

Services
Preceding station	SEPTA Metro	Following station
Thomson Avenue toward Orange Street/Media	D (SEPTA Metro)	Leamy Avenue toward 69th Street T.C.
Location

Woodland Avenue station is a stop on the D in Springfield Township, Delaware County, Pennsylvania. It is officially located on Woodland Avenue (PA 420) and Rolling Road, though Rolling Road is actually a block north of the tracks. A school and athletic field exists at the end of that intersection.

Trolleys arriving at this station travel between 69th Street Transit Center in Upper Darby Township, Pennsylvania and Orange Street in Media, Pennsylvania. The station has a shed with a roof on the south side of the tracks where people can go inside when it is raining. Like the Providence Road/Media station in Media, a storage track begins northeast of Woodland Avenue across from the station shed that eventually becomes the second track. Part of the reason for the single track is because the Crum Creek Bridge in Smedley Park only carries one track.
