= Leamy Avenue station =

SEPTA trolley station

Leamy Av
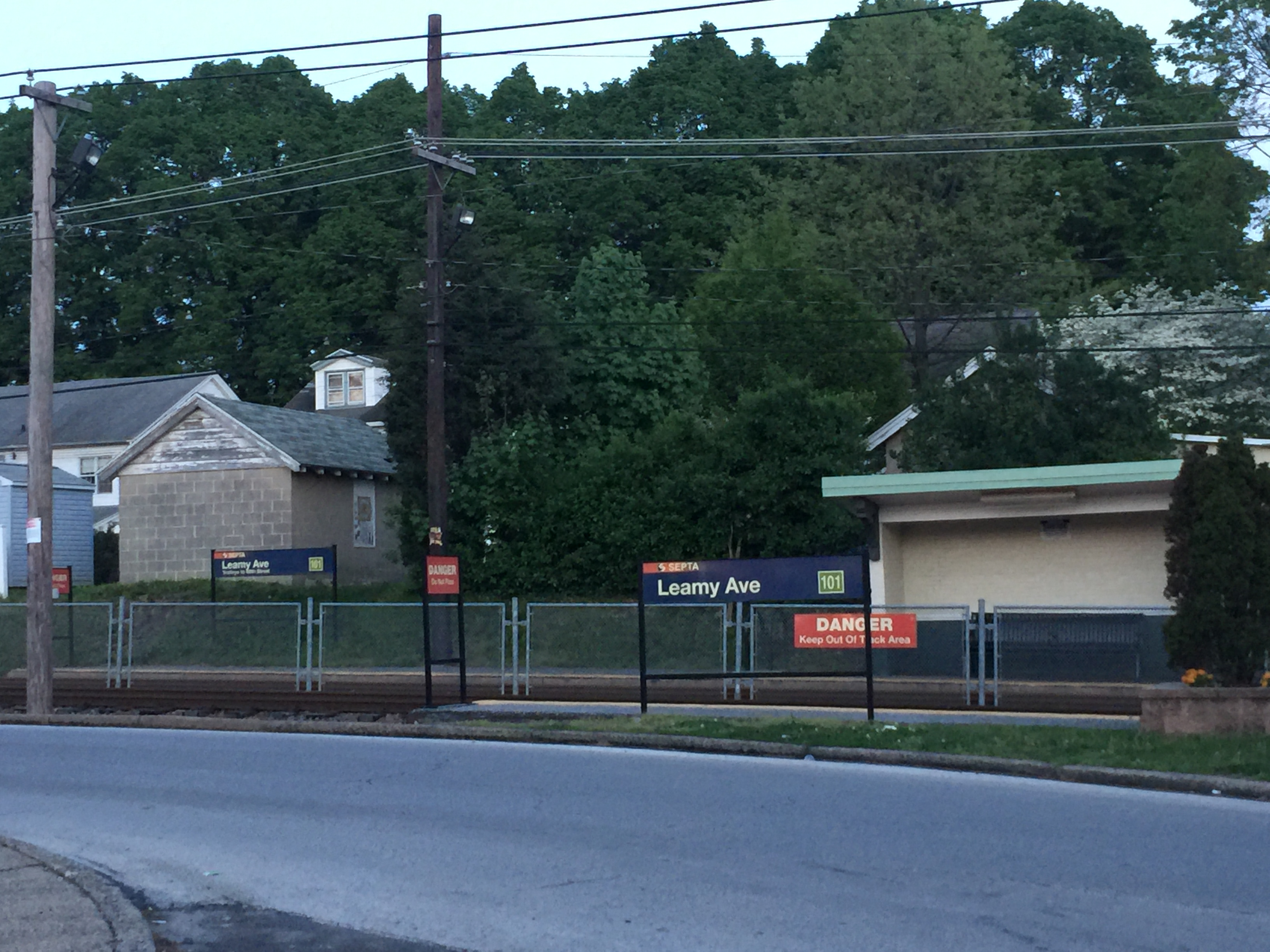

General information
- Location: Near Leamy Avenue & Rolling Road; Springfield, Pennsylvania.
- Coordinates: 39.9263°N 75.3372°W
- Owner: SEPTA
- Platforms: 2 side platforms
- Tracks: 2

Construction
- Structure type: Open stucco shelter (eastbound); Open acrylic glass shelter (westbound)
- Accessible: No

History
- Electrified: Overhead lines

Services
Preceding station	SEPTA Metro	Following station
Woodland Avenue toward Orange Street/Media	D (SEPTA Metro)	Saxer Avenue toward 69th Street T.C.
Location

Leamy Avenue station is a station on the D in Springfield Township, Delaware County, Pennsylvania. It is officially located near Leamy Avenue and Rolling Road, but is directly on the southeast corner of these streets.

Trolleys arriving at this station travel between 69th Street Transit Center in Upper Darby Township, Pennsylvania and Orange Street in Media, Pennsylvania. The station contains a green and white stucco shed with a roof on the south side of the tracks where people can go inside when it is raining, and a plexiglas and aluminum bus shelter on the north side of the tracks. A school is located on the northwest side of the tracks. At this location, the tracks run at a northeast-to-southwest direction. Leamy Avenue itself is divided as "West Leamy Avenue" northwest of the grade crossing, and "East Leamy Avenue" southeast of the grade crossing.
