= 1985 Springfield Mall shooting =

Mass shooting in Springfield, Pennsylvania, U.S.

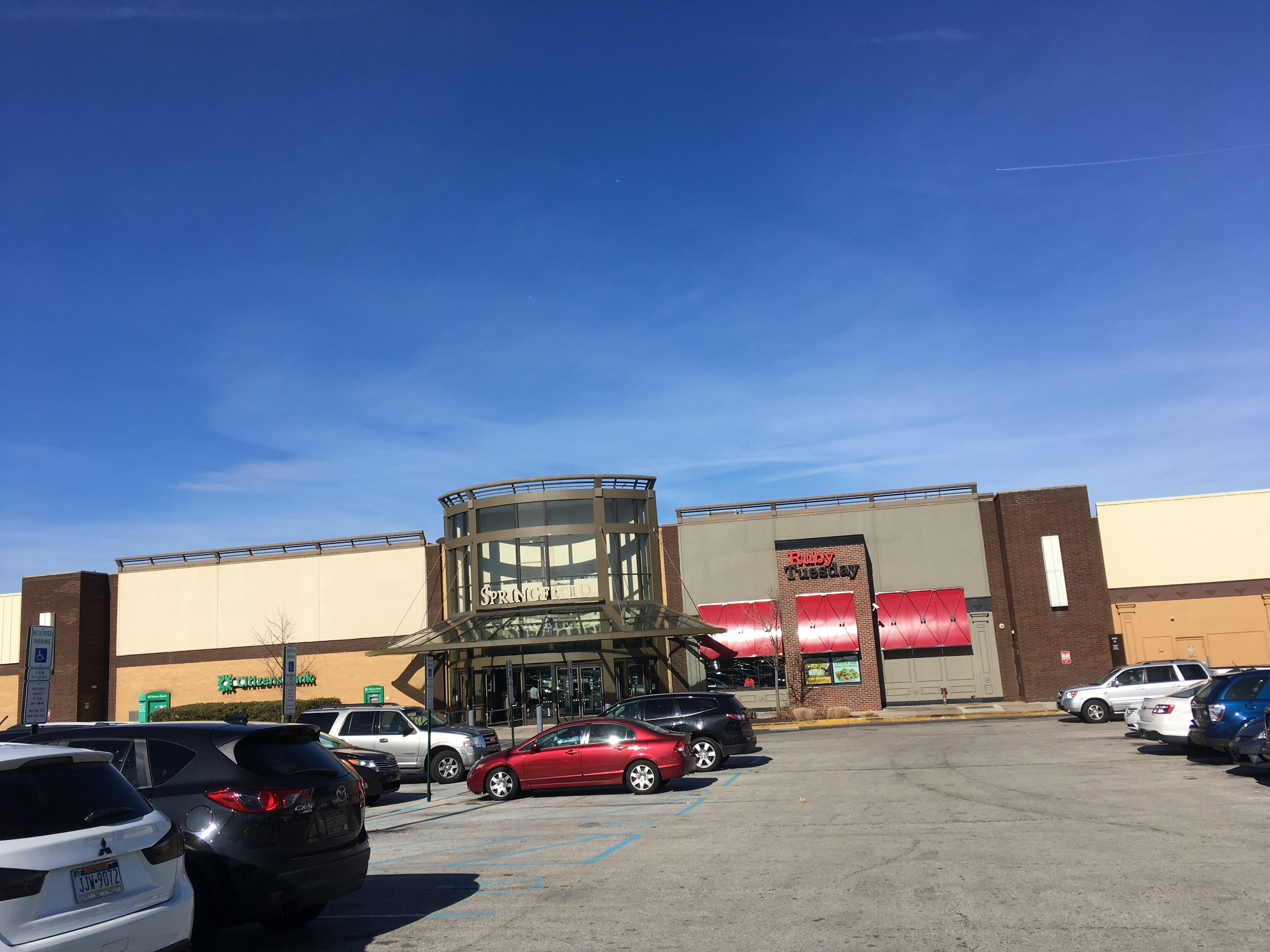
- Springfield Mall in 2018
- Location: 39.915°N 75.352°W; Springfield Mall, Springfield, Pennsylvania, U.S.
- Date: October 30, 1985; 41 years ago 3:45 pm (EST)
- Target: Mall visitors
- Attack type: Mass shooting
- Weapon: .22 LR Ruger 10/22 semi-automatic rifle
- Deaths: 3
- Injuries: 7
- Perpetrator: Sylvia Seegrist
- Defender: John W. Laufer III

On October 30, 1985, a mass shooting took place at the Springfield Mall, a shopping mall in Springfield Township, Delaware County, Pennsylvania, United States. Three people, including a toddler, were killed and seven others injured. The perpetrator, 25-year-old Sylvia Seegrist, was sentenced to three consecutive life sentences.

Due to Seegrist’s history of mental illness and earlier diagnosis of schizophrenia, the shooting stimulated discussion about the state's authority to commit at-risk people into mental care facilities against their will.

== Shootings ==
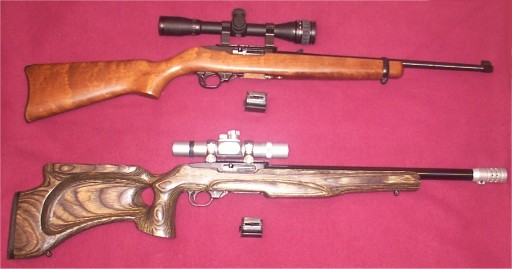
Two Ruger 10/22 with rotary magazines, similar to the weapon used in the shooting

On October 30, 1985, Sylvia Seegrist entered the Springfield Mall twice. The first time, she shopped for Halloween items at a party store, then worked out at a fitness club.

Returning to the parking lot, Seegrist went to her vehicle, a Datsun B-210, dressed in green military fatigues and retrieved a hunting rifle she had bought a few days earlier. She fired at a man approximately 30 yards (27 m) from where she stood, and missed. The man saw the vehicle she arrived in, and flattened one of the Datsun's tires to prevent her escape. Seegrist fired at a woman using a nearby ATM, but missed. Seegrist shot at an outdoor The Magic Pan restaurant, killing two-year-old Recife Cosmen, who was waiting in line with his parents, and injuring two other children.

Once inside, Seegrist fired into some stores and ignored others. She shot 67-year-old (Ernest) Earl Trout, a gynecologist, in front of a store; Trout fell into a coma and died a month later. 64-year-old Augusto Ferrara was shot and killed as he walked out of a shoe store. Both Trout and Ferrara were found by their wives, who had been shopping separately. Several witnesses initially believed the shooting was an elaborate Halloween prank.

24-year-old John W. Laufer III, a local graduate student and volunteer fire fighter, disarmed Seegrist as she approached him and tried to raise her gun to shoot him. Laufer, under the belief that Seegrist was firing blank ammunition as a prank, forced her into a store while he waited for mall security. When asked by the first arriving guard why she had committed the shooting, Seegrist replied, "My family makes me nervous". During her arrest, Seegrist loudly cursed and complained about her parents, stating, “You should have killed me on the spot.” While in custody, she asked detectives how many people she killed, and voiced frustration that there were "only two dead", asking if "any of them [were] kids".

== Perpetrator ==

Sylvia Wynanda Seegrist was born on July 3, 1960, in Alameda County, California. At Seegrist's trial, her mother Ruth testified that her daughter's paternal grandfather fondled and exposed himself in front of Sylvia when she was 8 years old, and that Ruth had not learned about the sexual abuse until Sylvia was 13. When the two discussed the abuse, Seegrist reportedly told her mother that she didn't know "how intimate our relationship was."

Seegrist was first hospitalized at the age of sixteen, and was diagnosed with schizophrenia. Between 1976 and 1985, she was hospitalized 15 times and, upon each discharge, psychiatrists diagnosed that she no longer posed a risk to herself or others. In summer 1981, while hospitalized at an outpatient clinic, Seegrist injured a female counsellor by stabbing her in the back with a paring knife. She was not criminally charged and instead sent to a rehabilitation program. In another incident, Seegrist non-fatally strangled her mother Ruth. While on outpatient release, Seegrist's mother once found a gun in her daughter's room and when confronted, Seegrist stated that she had planned to use it to kill both her parents and herself. Ruth Seegrist stated that her daughter regularly made suicide threats and once explicitly stated "Someday before I kill myself, I'll bring some people down with me".

In 1984, Seegrist enlisted in the U.S. Army. During training, she faced harassment from her drill sergeant and other members of her platoon. She was discharged from the Army after two months in 1985. At the time of the shooting, she was a resident of Crum Lynne, Pennsylvania.

Seegrist spent a good deal of time at the Springfield Mall, harassing customers and making statements about how "good" other spree killings were, such as the 1984 San Ysidro McDonald's massacre. Seegrist was known to loiter around the mall wearing combat fatigues in imitation of James Huberty, the perpetrator in the San Ysidro shooting, for which merchants nicknamed her "Ms. Rambo", which she disliked. A pharmacist recalled that she regularly came in to fill her prescription and acted aggressively when the store refused to take an outdated order. An instructor at the fitness club said "she hated everyone and would often talk about shooting and killing people". At other times, Seegrist ranted about the energy crisis, nuclear power, and famine.

Seegrist's behavior was so disconcerting that clerks at the local K-Mart in neighboring Clifton Heights told her they had no rifles in stock when she tried to purchase one from them. She eventually purchased a Ruger 10/22 at another store. A few hours before the shooting, Seegrist's mother begged her daughter to voluntarily commit herself to psychiatric treatment, which Seegrist refused to do.

=== Trial and incarceration ===
Prior to the competency hearing Seegrist was transferred to Norristown State Hospital for evaluation. On March 6, 1986, Seegrist was deemed competent to stand trial for the killings and charged with three counts of murder and seven counts of attempted murder. The trial began on June 2, 1986. On June 27, she was found guilty but mentally ill, she was sentenced to three consecutive life sentences and seven consecutive 10-year terms. The judge had said that Seegrist "should spend the rest of her life in some form of incarceration". She was sent to the psychiatric specialty hospital Mayview State Hospital for evaluation and was eventually moved to the State Correctional Institution in Muncy, Pennsylvania.

Sylvia Seegrist served her first 2 1/2 years of imprisonment at Norristown State Hospital, and then was transferred to Muncy State Prison for women. Ruth Seegrist and her ex-husband visited Sylvia regularly at Muncy, and she seemed to welcome the visits. But around 1997, Sylvia decided to end any contact with her family members. Visits and phone calls ended. The last letter Ruth Seegrist sent to her daughter was on November 30, 1997, and Sylvia never replied.

Seegrist's Muncy Prison counselor met with her at least every two weeks, noting Sylvia takes her medication, spends time at the library, exercises a lot and "takes steps to keep herself sharp". In a 1999 letter to The New York Times, Seegrist wrote, "As I am safer in prison less threatening or perverted lesser crimes than my family [sic]."

== Aftermath ==
The shooting spurred the state government to form a legislative task force, in order to address better ways to care for the mentally ill in the community. Seegrist's mother also urged legislators to make changes to the state mental health laws. The existence or nature of changes made by the task force is unknown. In response to the 2012 Sandy Hook Elementary School shooting, Seegrist's mother Ruth told the magazine Philadelphia:

You know, it's ironic that people who are irrational are expected under the law to get help on their own. There needs to be something in the law that compels a troubled person to be diagnosed by a psychiatrist. In the 1950s, we were institutionalizing people who weren't mentally ill. You could institutionalize someone who was just unruly. We've gone from one extreme to the other.

At the time of the shootings, gun buyers were required to sign a paper application declaring they had no record of being in a mental institution. Sylvia Seegrist lied on the application and purchased the .22 semi-automatic rifle used in the murders for $107.00. In 1998, the state of Pennsylvania enacted the Pennsylvania Instant Check System or PICS, enabling licensed gun dealers to conduct a background check using a phone.

John Laufer III, who stopped the perpetrator, was granted entry into police academy in late 1985, becoming a state trooper the following year. While Laufer had applied for training prior to the shooting, media attention encouraged officials into the hastened acceptance into the service for Laufer, who had already been graded 49th out of a list of 2,000 applicants. In 2013, Laufer became the police chief of Coatesville, Pennsylvania, and in 2019, he won a Law Enforcement Officer of the Year award.
