= Secane, Pennsylvania =

Unincorporated community in Pennsylvania, US

- Unincorporated community
- Location within the U.S. state of Pennsylvania Secane (the United States)
- Coordinates: 39°54′50″N 75°18′08″W
- Country: United States
- State: Pennsylvania
- County: Delaware
- Townships: Upper Darby, Ridley
- Time zone: UTC−5 (Eastern (EST))
  - Summer (DST): UTC−4 (EDT)
- ZIP Code: 19018
- Area codes: 610 and 484

Secane is an unincorporated community in Ridley Township and Upper Darby Township, Delaware County, Pennsylvania, United States. At its center is retail shopping and a commuter rail station. Immediately surrounding the center are four large garden apartment complexes surrounded by single-family homes. The neighborhood has a curvilinear/cul-de-sac street pattern typical of post-World War II residential development. It is located in two school districts, Upper Darby and Ridley.

== History ==
Secane is named after a 17th-century Algonquin leader. In July 1683, William Penn purchased the lands between Chester Creek and the Schuylkill River from the Unami chiefs Secane and Icquoquehan.

Secane was the home of the Tully-Secane Country Club. However, the Archdiocese of Philadelphia converted the golf course into Our Lady of Fatima Church.

== Geography ==
Secane is divided between the municipalities of Ridley Township, and Upper Darby Township, and is often confused with Clifton Heights, since the two communities share the same ZIP code.

The Muckinipattis Creek initiates in Secane and runs south through the community until its confluence with Darby Creek in Tinicum Township. Secane has a humid subtropical climate (Cfa) and average monthly temperatures range from 33.2 °F in January to 78.0 °F in July. The local hardiness zone is 7a.

== Education ==
Ridley School District serves houses in Ridley Township. Upper Darby School District serves houses in Upper Darby Township.

Our Lady of Angels Regional School in Ridley Township, near Morton, is the area Catholic school. It formed in 2012 from a merger of Our Lady of Fatima in Secane and Ridley Township and Our Lady of Perpetual Help in Ridley Township.

== Demographics ==
Secane has a population of almost 24,000 people and was farmland before it was developed into a residential area in the 20th century.

== Transportation ==
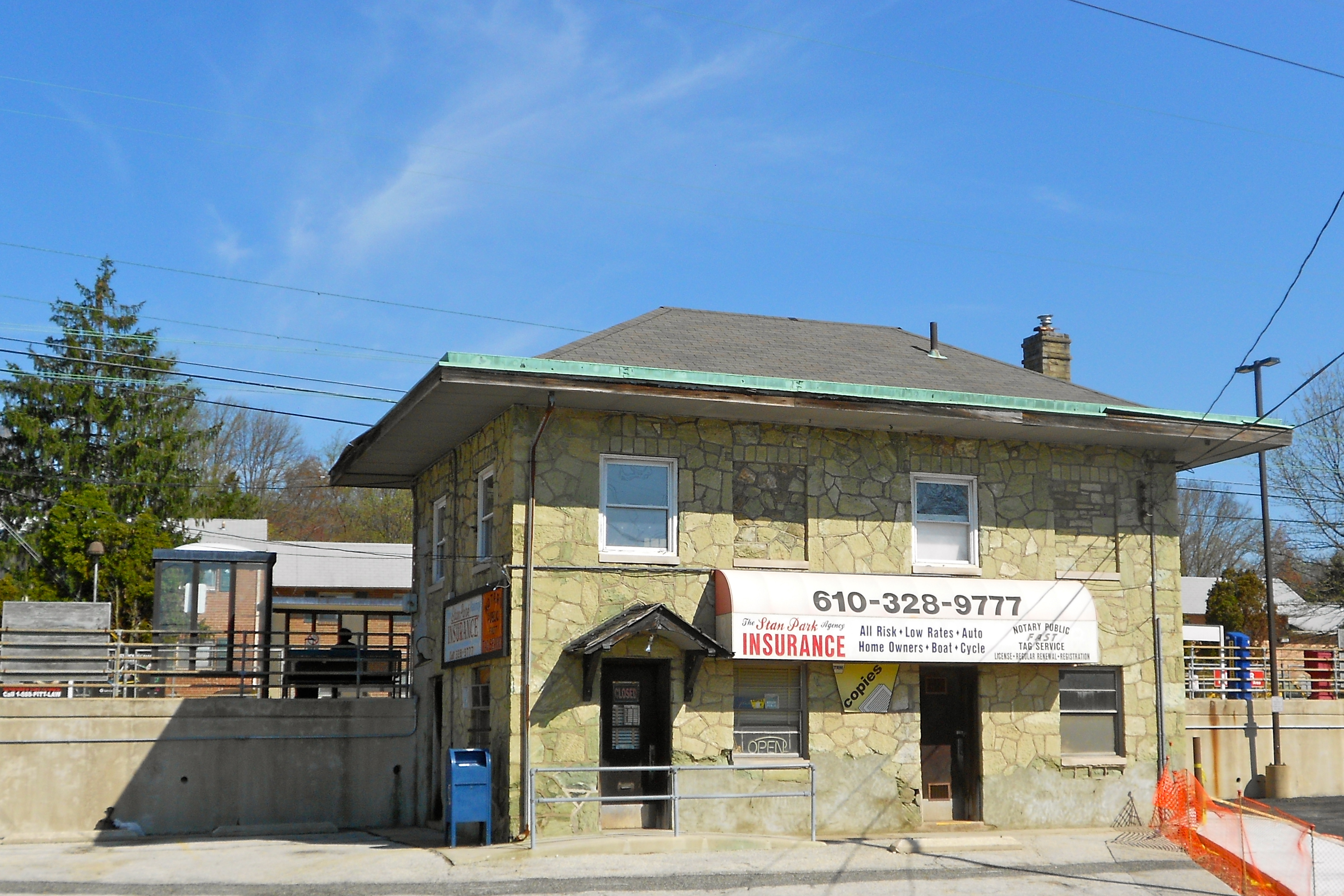
Secane station in 2015

Three main roads run through the town: Providence Road, South Avenue and Franklin Avenue, which leads to Kedron Avenue (Route 420). Secane station is a stop on the SEPTA Regional Rail Media/Wawa Line, which runs west from Philadelphia to Wawa. The station was previously a stop on the Pennsylvania Railroad and known as Spring Hill.

== Notable people ==
- Pat Croce, former Philadelphia 76ers owner
- Joe Sestak, retired U.S. Navy officer and congressman
