= Pennsylvania Route 420 =

State highway in Delaware County, Pennsylvania, US

Pennsylvania Route 420

Route information
- Maintained by PennDOT
- Length: 5.600 mi (9.012 km)

Major junctions
- South end: PA 291 in Tinicum Township
- I-95 in Tinicum Township; US 13 in Prospect Park
- North end: PA 320 in Springfield Township

Location
- Country: United States
- State: Pennsylvania
- Counties: Delaware

Highway system
- Pennsylvania State Route System; Interstate; US; State; Scenic; Legislative
← PA 419	→ US 422

Pennsylvania Route 420 (PA 420) is a north–south state highway in Delaware County, Pennsylvania. The route runs 5.6 miles (9.0 km) from PA 291 in Tinicum Township, a short distance west of the Philadelphia International Airport, northwest to PA 320 in Springfield Township. PA 420 runs through suburban areas, passing through Prospect Park, Folsom, and Morton. The route interchanges with Interstate 95 (I-95) in Tinicum Township and intersects U.S. Route 13 (US 13) in Prospect Park. PA 420 was first designated by 1928 to run from PA 191 at the intersection of 84th Street and Bartram Avenue in Philadelphia to PA 320 in Springfield. By 1950, the southern terminus was moved to its current location at PA 291.

== Route description ==
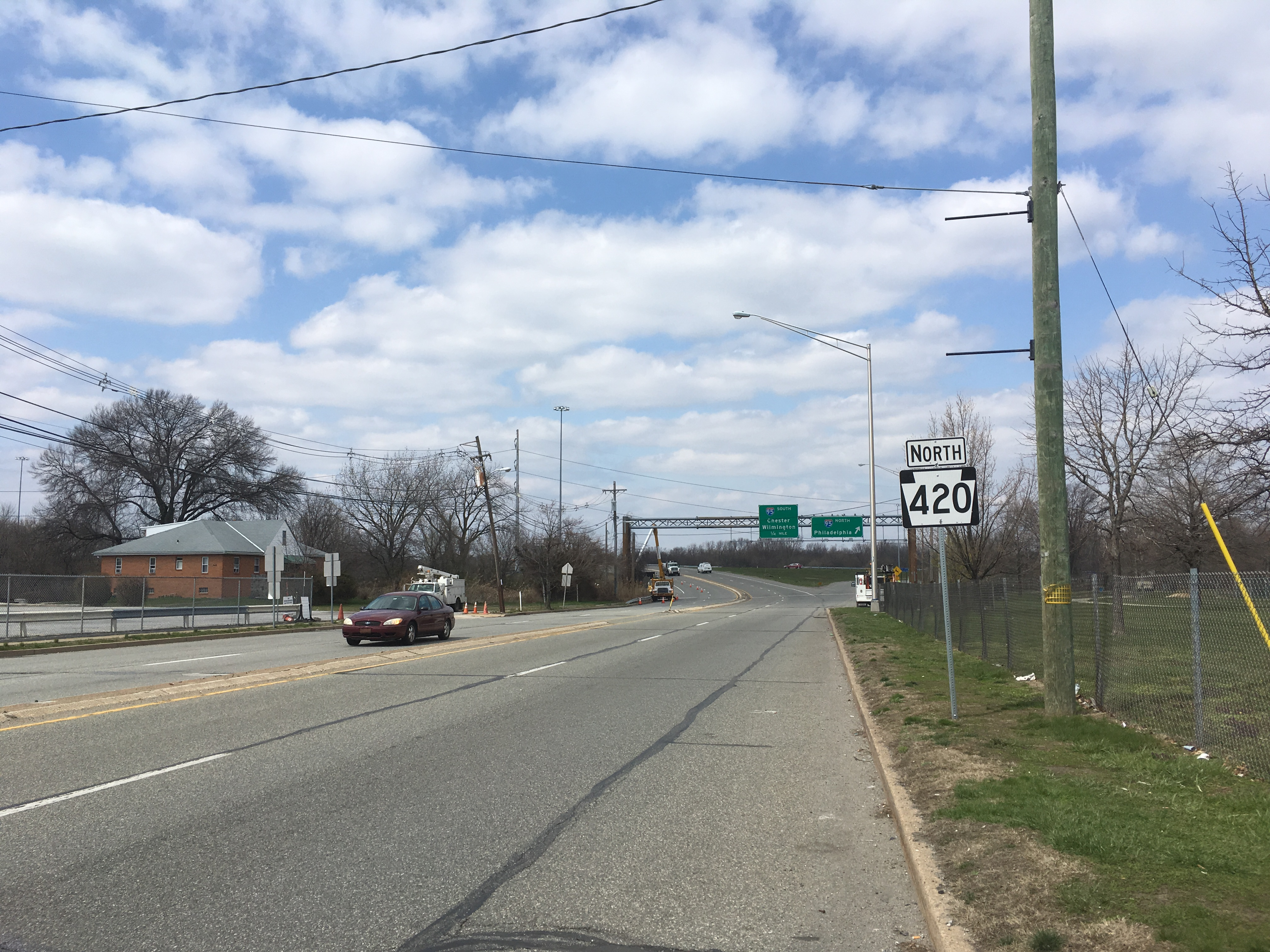
PA 420 northbound past its southern terminus at PA 291 in Essington

PA 420 begins at an intersection with PA 291 in Tinicum Township, Delaware County, heading north on four-lane divided Wanamaker Avenue. South of here, Wanamaker Avenue continues south as an unnumbered road into the community of Essington toward the Delaware River. From PA 291, the route passes near businesses and comes to a cloverleaf interchange with I-95, where it curves to the north-northwest. Past this interchange, the road heads through wooded areas within the John Heinz National Wildlife Refuge at Tinicum before crossing the Darby Creek into the borough of Prospect Park. Here, PA 420 curves north and becomes four-lane undivided Lincoln Avenue, heading into residential areas. The route turns north-northwest again and intersects US 13 near businesses. The road narrows to two lanes and passes more homes and businesses, running through the downtown of Prospect Park. PA 420 comes to a low-clearance bridge under Amtrak's Northeast Corridor railroad line west of the Prospect Park station serving SEPTA's Wilmington/Newark Line before it runs past more homes. The route crosses under CSX's Philadelphia Subdivision railroad line, at which point it enters Ridley Township and becomes Kedron Avenue.

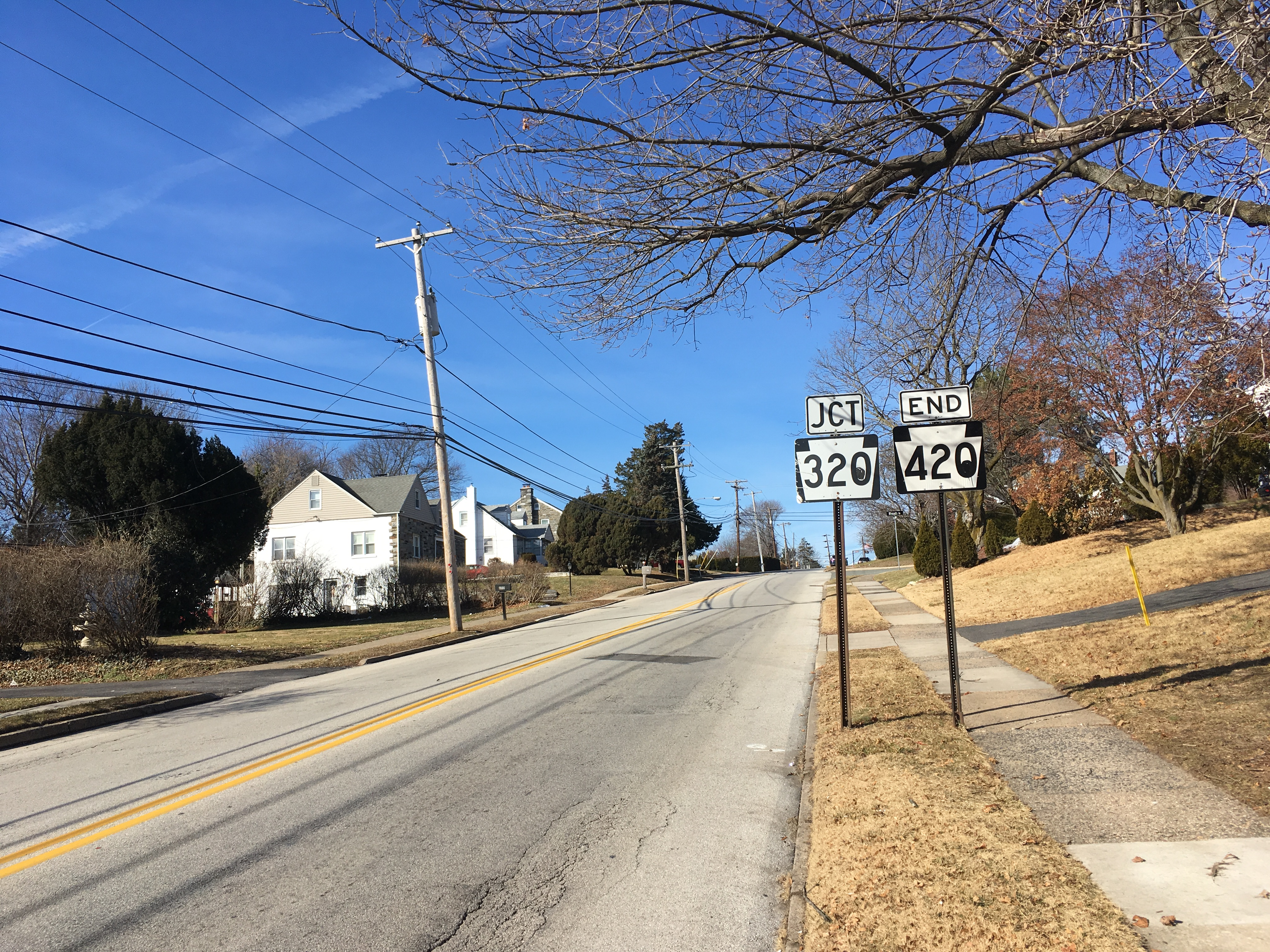
PA 420 northbound approaching its terminus at PA 320 in Springfield Township

The road runs into business areas and crosses MacDade Boulevard in the community of Folsom. PA 420 continues through suburban development, curving to the northwest and passing near more residential neighborhoods. The route enters the borough of Morton, where it passes businesses. PA 420 becomes Woodland Avenue as it intersects Morton Avenue immediately before a grade crossing with SEPTA's Media/Wawa Line east of the Morton station. Past this, the road heads through commercial development with some homes to the northeast, continuing into Springfield Township. The route heads between woods to the west and residential areas to the east, gaining a second southbound lane as it heads into business areas and crosses Baltimore Pike. Past this, PA 420 becomes two lanes again and continues through suburban areas of homes. The road gains a center left-turn lane and passes businesses as it comes to a grade crossing with SEPTA's light rail Media–Sharon Hill Line west of the Woodland Avenue station. The route becomes two lanes again and passes near more homes with some patches of woods. PA 420 curves more to the west and comes to its northern terminus at an intersection with PA 320 a short distance to the south of that route's interchange with US 1.

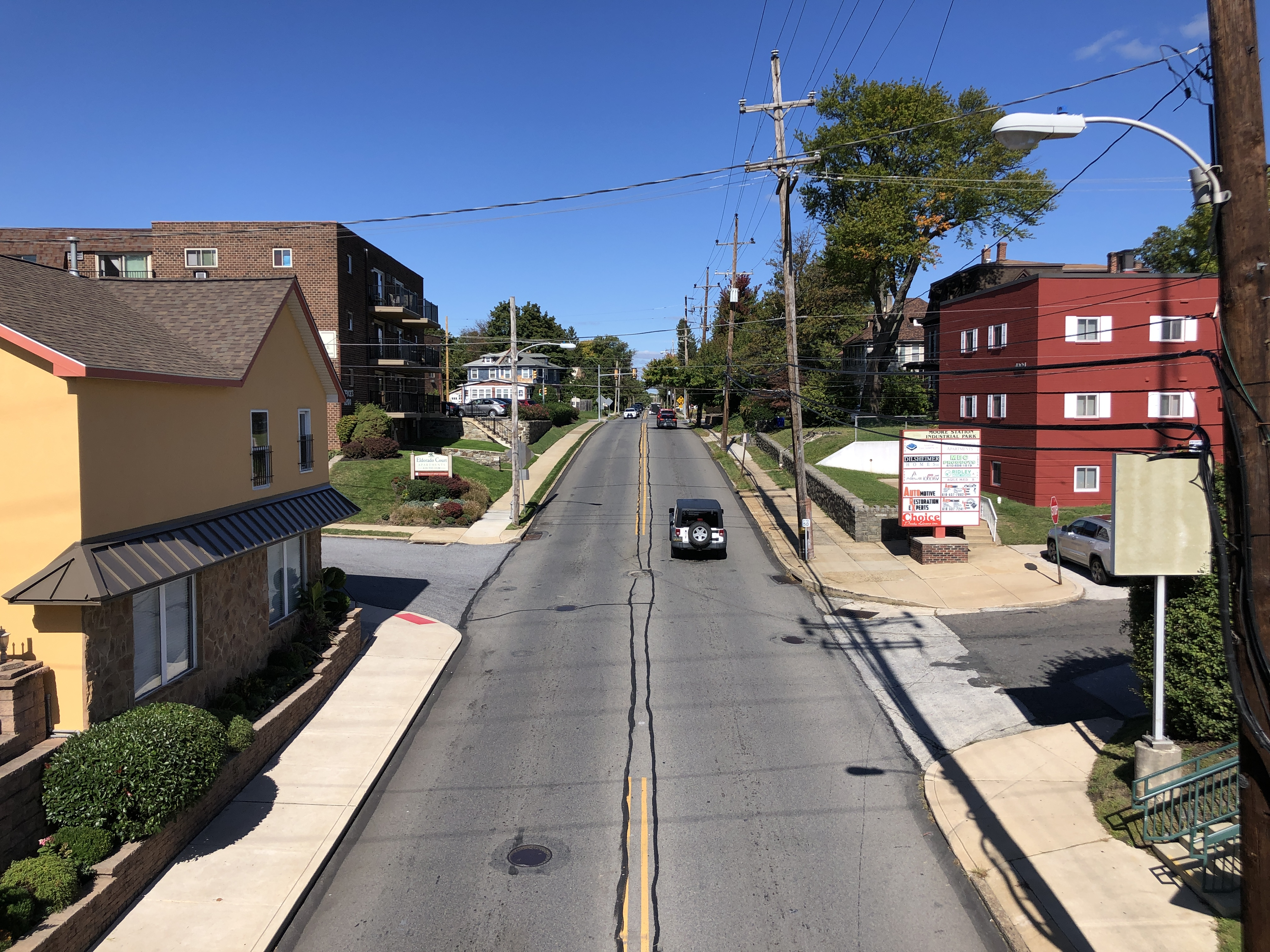
PA 420 northbound in Prospect Park

== History ==
When Pennsylvania first legislated routes in 1911, what is now PA 420 was not given a number. PA 420 was first designated by 1928 to run from PA 191 (84th Street/Bartram Avenue) in Philadelphia north to PA 320 in Springfield, heading west along Bartram Avenue in Philadelphia and 2nd Street in Tinicum Township to Essington, where it turned north along Wanamaker Avenue and continued along its current alignment. By 1950, the southern terminus of PA 420 was moved to its current location at PA 291 near Essington, with the former alignment becoming an unnumbered road.

== Major intersections ==
The entire route is in Delaware County.

Location	mi	km	Destinations	Notes
Tinicum Township	0.000	0.000	PA 291 (Industrial Highway) – Philadelphia, Chester	Southern terminus
Tinicum Township	0.321	0.517	I-95 – Chester, Wilmington, Philadelphia	Exit 9 on I-95
Prospect Park	1.173	1.888	US 13 (Chester Pike) – Chester, Norwood	
Springfield Township	5.600	9.012	PA 320 (Sproul Road) – Swarthmore, Broomall	Northern terminus
1.000 mi = 1.609 km; 1.000 km = 0.621 mi

== PA 420 Alternate Truck ==
=== Prospect Park ===
PA Route 420 Alternate Truck
- Location: Prospect Park, Pennsylvania
- Length: 2.8 mi (4.5 km)
- Existed: 2013–present

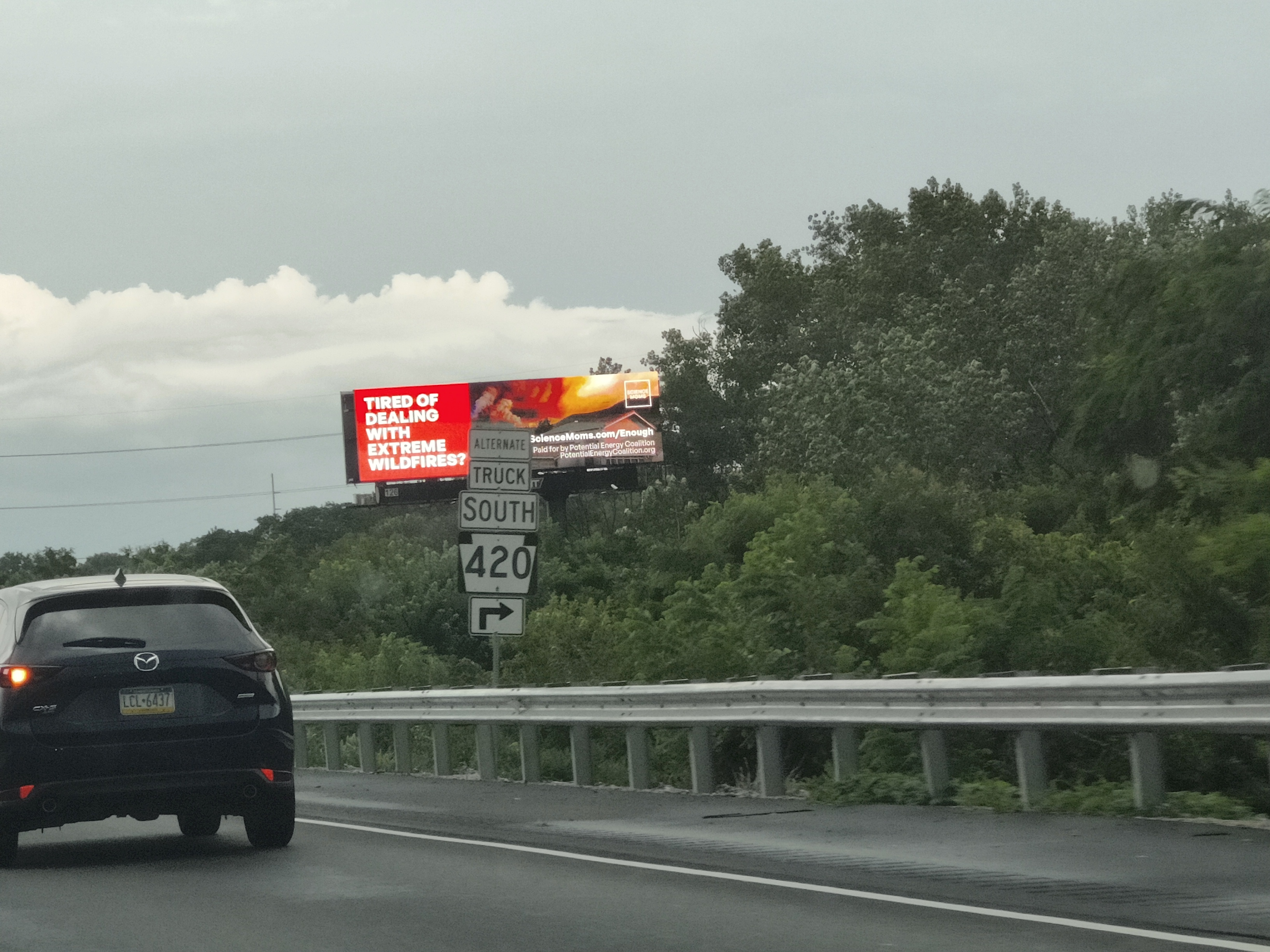
PA 420 Alternate Truck southbound along I-95.

Pennsylvania Route 420 Alternate Truck is a southbound truck route around a weight-restricted bridge carrying southbound PA 420 over the Darby Creek in Prospect Park, on which trucks over 30 tons and combination loads over 40 tons are prohibited. The route follows US 13, Stewart Avenue, and I-95. It was signed in 2013.

=== Ridley Township ===
PA Route 420 Alternate Truck
- Location: Ridley Township, Pennsylvania
- Length: 2.7 mi (4.3 km)
- Existed: 2013–present

Pennsylvania Route 420 Alternate Truck is a truck route around a weight-restricted bridge over the Stony Creek in Ridley Township, on which trucks over 34 tons and combination loads over 40 tons are prohibited, and a weight-restricted bridge over a branch of the Stony Creek in Ridley Township, on which trucks over 36 tons and combination loads over 40 tons are prohibited. The route follows MacDade Boulevard and Morton Avenue. It was signed in 2013.
