= Springfield Friends Meeting House =

Quaker church in Delaware County, Pennsylvania

Coordinates: 39.941359°N 75.348524°W

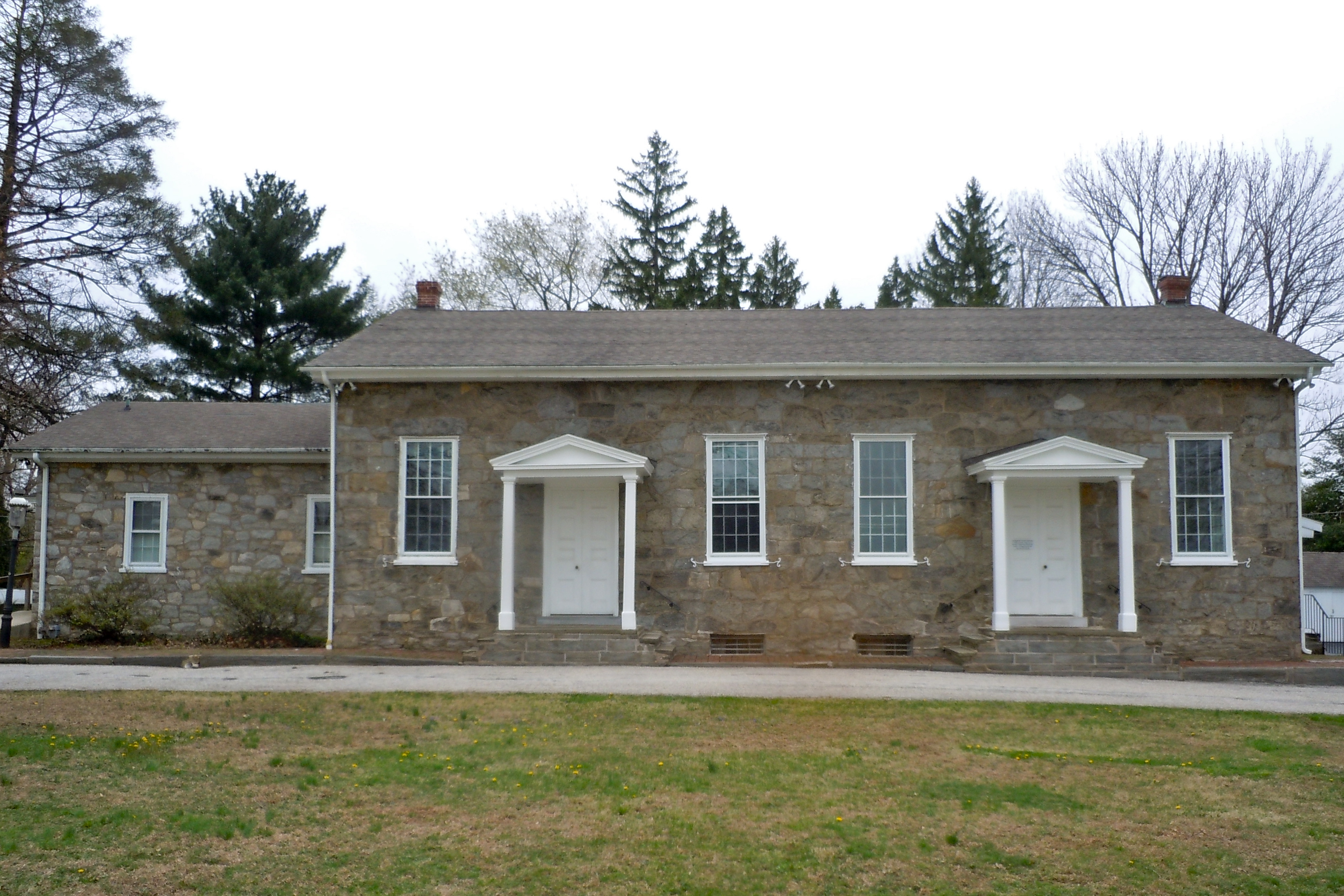
Springfield Friends Meetinghouse built in 1850

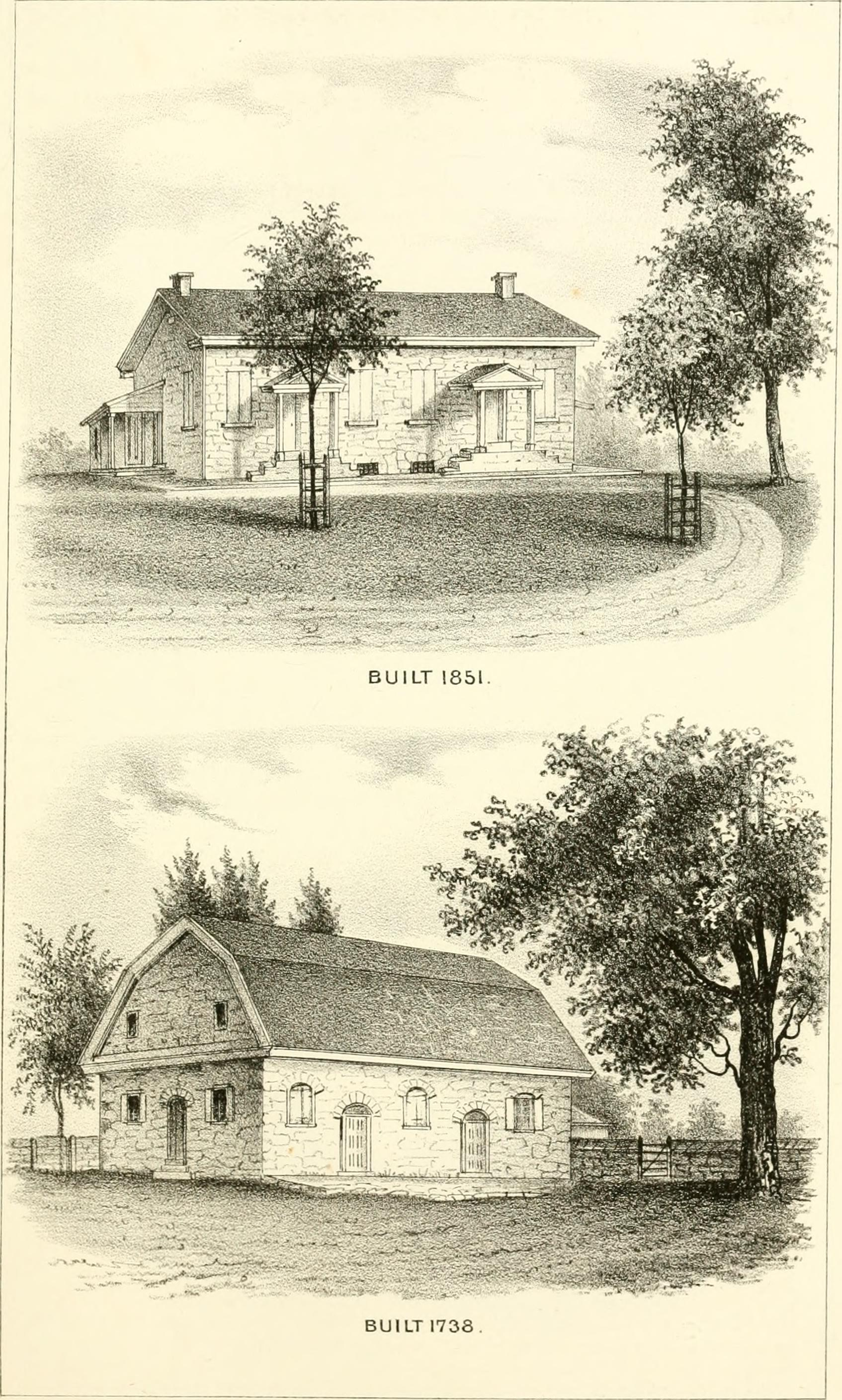
Springfield Friends Meetinghouse in Henry Graham Ashmead's "History of Delaware County, Pennsylvania," 1862

The Springfield Friends Meetinghouse is a Quaker meeting house that is located at 1001 Old Sproul Road in Springfield Township, Delaware County, Pennsylvania, United States.

== History and notable features ==
The Quakers who settled in Springfield founded a society of Friends in 1686. The first meetinghouse built here was erected in 1703 but was then destroyed by fire in 1737. That original building may have been built using stone but was more likely a log structure.

The construction of a new meetinghouse began in 1738. A stone building, it functioned as the meetinghouse for 113 years; it was then replaced in 1850 by a new structure that still stands today and is still an active worship center.

The Peace Center of Delaware County also operates out of the meetinghouse.

== Notable burials ==
- Edward Mifflin (1923–1971), Pennsylvania State Representative
