= Primos station =

Railway Station in Upper Darby Township, Pennsylvania

Primos
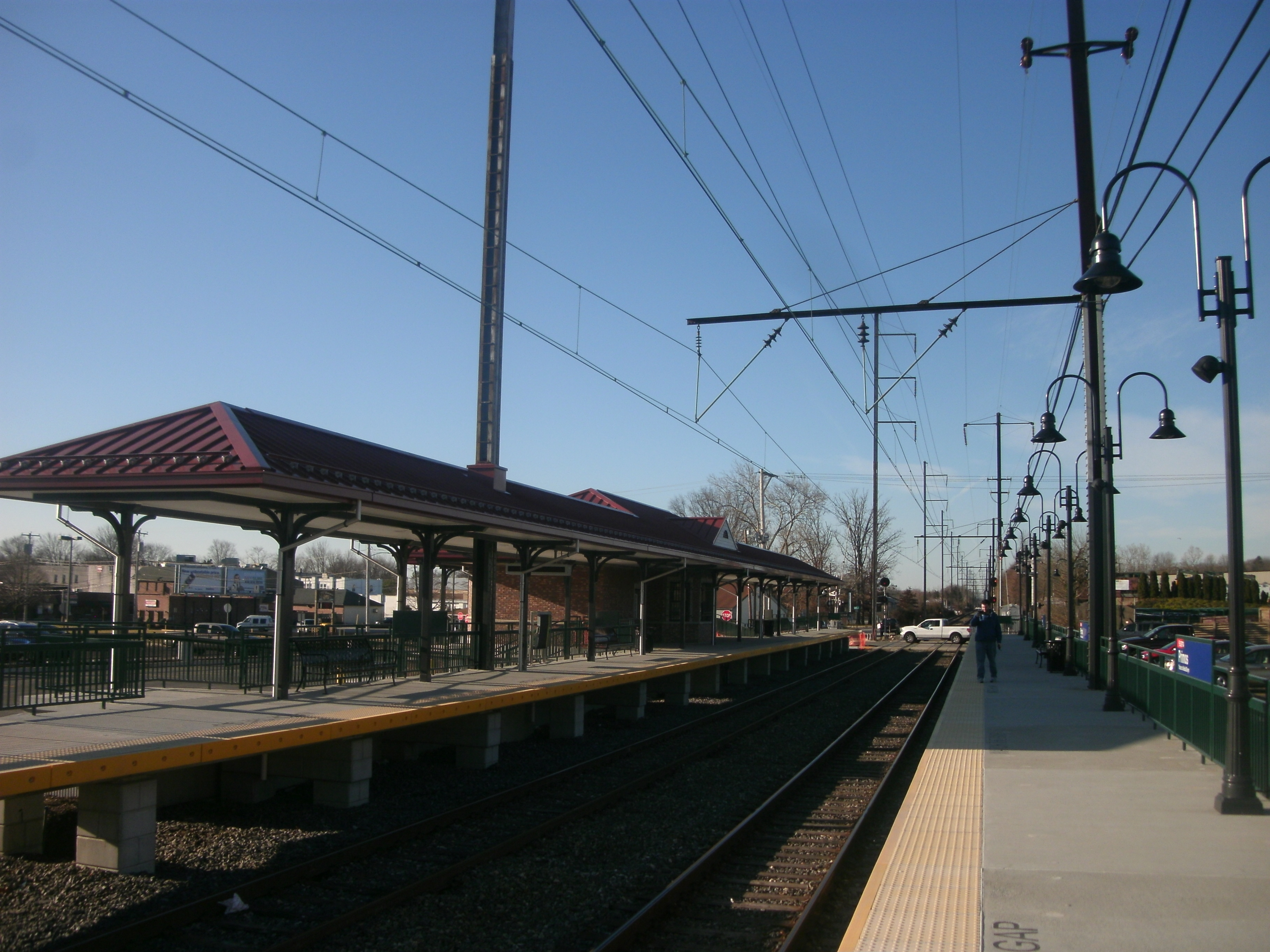
- Primos station in January 2013, after construction of the high-level platforms.

General information
- Location: 501 Oak Avenue; Primos, Pennsylvania
- Coordinates: 39.9216°N 75.2983°W
- Owner: SEPTA
- Platforms: 2 side platforms
- Tracks: 2
- Connections: SEPTA Suburban Bus: 107

Construction
- Parking: Yes
- Accessible: Yes

Other information
- Fare zone: 2

History
- Electrified: December 2, 1928
- Former names: Oak Lane

Passengers
- 2017: 652 boardings 703 alightings (weekday average)
- Rank: 33 of 146

Services
Preceding station	SEPTA	Following station
Secane toward Wawa Station	Media/Wawa Line	Clifton–Aldan toward Temple University
Former services
Preceding station	Pennsylvania Railroad	Following station
Secane toward West Chester	West Chester Line	Clifton toward Suburban Station
Location

Primos station is a SEPTA Regional Rail station in the Primos area of Upper Darby Township, Pennsylvania. Located at Oak and Secane Avenues, it serves the Media/Wawa Line. In 2013, this station saw 322 boardings and 398 alightings on an average weekday. It consists of a pre-fabricated office trailer on one platform, and an open brick shelter on the other, and includes a 52-car parking lot. Before becoming an established station, Primos was a flag stop known as Oak Lane.

== Station layout ==
Primos has two high-level side platforms.
