= Springfield Mall station =

Springfield Mall
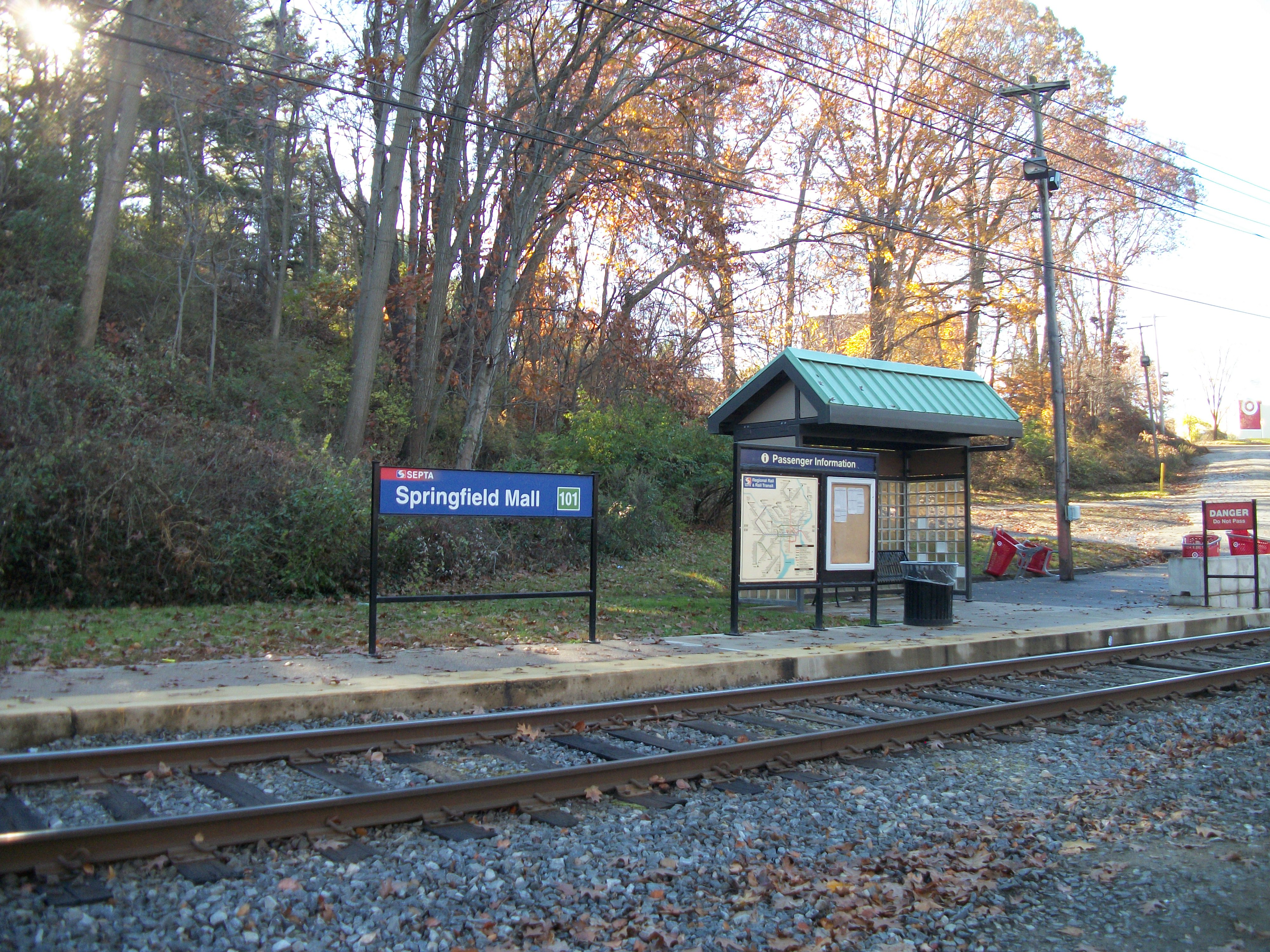
- The platform of Springfield Mall D1 Trolley Stop. Taken from the right of way.

General information
- Location: Sproul Road behind Springfield Mall; Springfield, Pennsylvania
- Coordinates: 39.9182°N 75.3488°W
- Owner: SEPTA
- Platforms: 1 side platform
- Tracks: 1
- Connections: SEPTA Suburban Bus: 107, 109, 110

Construction
- Structure type: Open acrylic glass shelter
- Parking: Yes
- Accessible: No

History
- Electrified: Overhead lines
- Former names: Sproul Road

Services
Preceding station	SEPTA Metro	Following station
Paper Mill Road toward Orange Street/Media	D (SEPTA Metro)	Thomson Avenue toward 69th Street T.C.
Location

Springfield Mall station is a stop on the D in Springfield Township, Delaware County, Pennsylvania. It is located on Sproul Road (PA 320) behind the parking lot of Springfield Mall. It is also located below the embankment of the Sproul Road Bridge, which crosses over the D1.

Trolleys arriving at this station travel between 69th Street Transit Center in Upper Darby Township, Pennsylvania and Orange Street in Media, Pennsylvania. The station has an acrylic glass bus shelter where people can go inside when it is raining. It also has free parking, and a staircase leading to and from the Sproul Road Bridge. It was previously known strictly as Sproul Road station until the Springfield Mall was built in 1974. The station itself can be found on a hill below the back parking lot of the mall and has a single track as it enters Smedley County Park, and then becomes a two-track line again before crossing Pine Ridge Road.
