= Morton, Pennsylvania =

Borough in Pennsylvania, US

- Borough
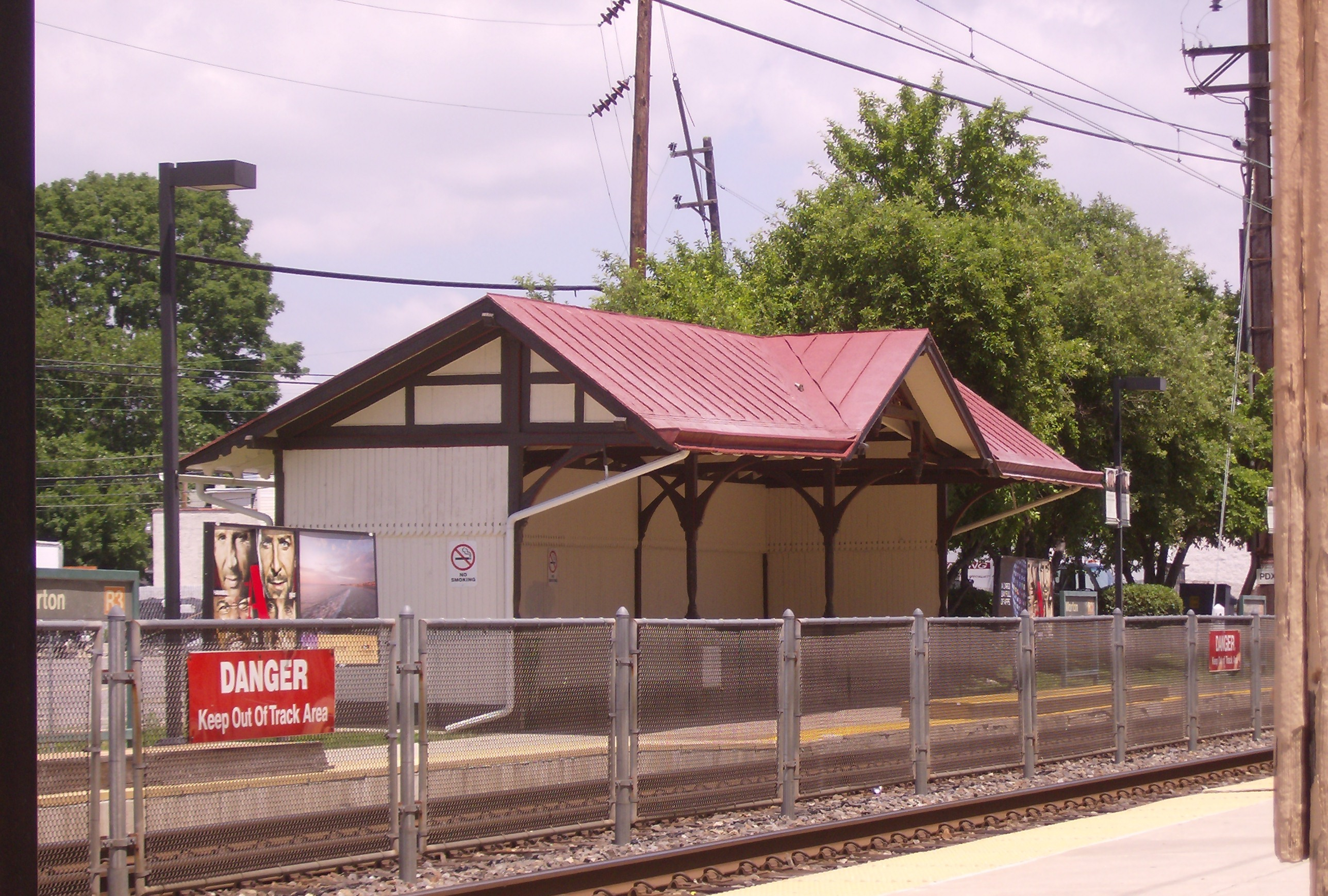
- Morton station in May 2010

- Location of Delaware County (top) and of Delaware County in Pennsylvania (bottom)

- Location of Morton in Pennsylvania Morton (the United States)
- Coordinates: 39°54′38″N 75°19′38″W
- Country: United States
- State: Pennsylvania
- County: Delaware

Area
  - Total: 0.36 sq mi (0.93 km^{2})
  - Land: 0.36 sq mi (0.93 km^{2})
  - Water: 0 sq mi (0.00 km^{2})
- Elevation: 141 ft (43 m)

Population (2020)
  - Total: 2,278
  - Density: 7,755.0/sq mi (2,994.21/km^{2})
- Time zone: UTC−5 (EST)
  - Summer (DST): UTC−4 (EDT)
- ZIP Code: 19070
- Area codes: 610 and 484
- FIPS code: 42-51176
- GNIS feature ID: 1181592
- Website: www.mortonboropa.org

Morton is a borough in Delaware County, Pennsylvania, United States. The population was 2,778 at the 2020 census.

== Geography ==
Morton is located in eastern Delaware County at 39°54′38″N 75°19′38″W (39.910612, -75.327273). It is bordered to the north, east, and west by Springfield Township and to the south by Ridley Township.

According to the United States Census Bureau, Morton has a total area of 0.36 square miles (0.93 km^{2}), all land.

== Transportation ==
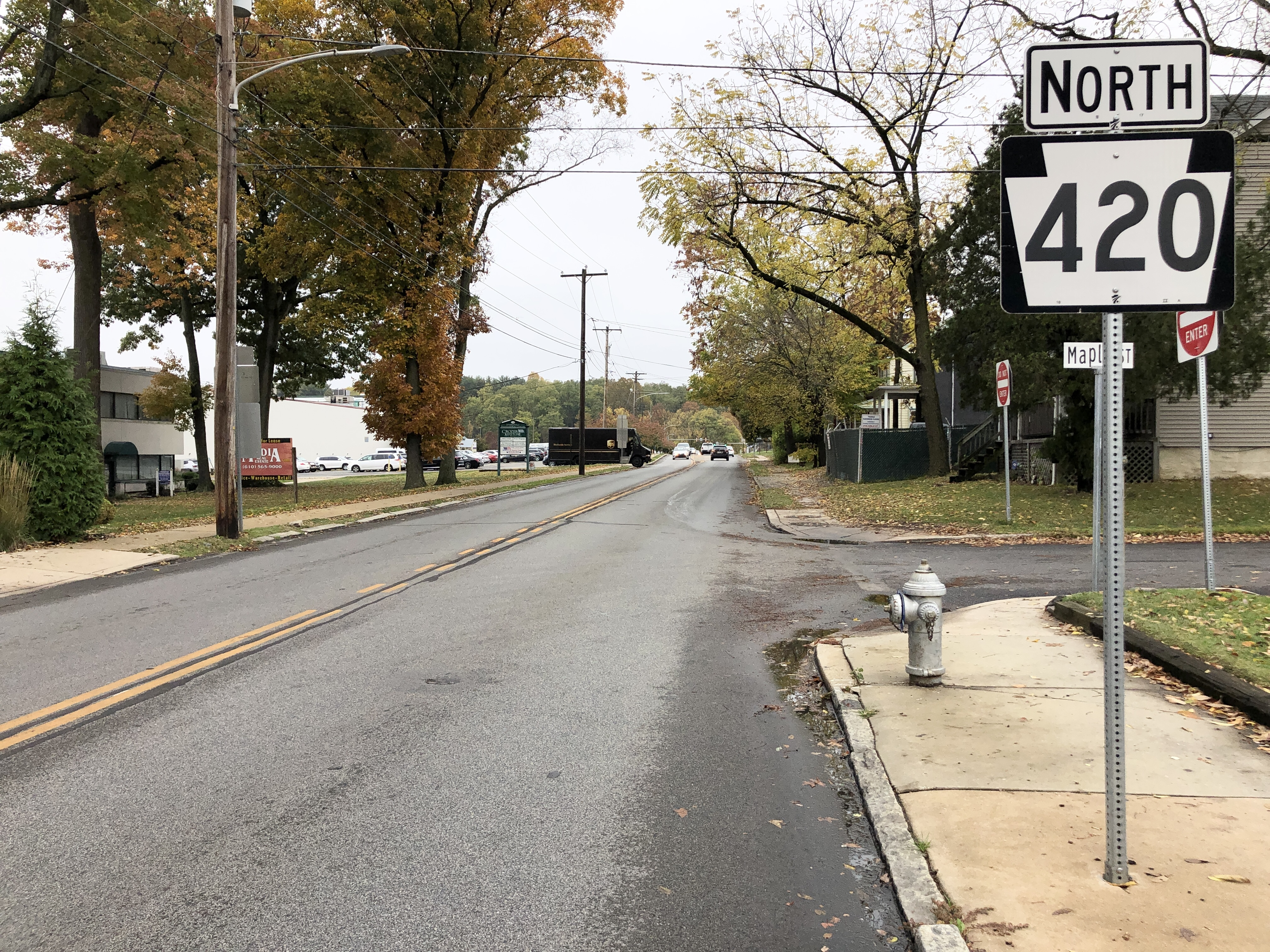
PA Route 420 North in Morton

As of 2010, there were 7.78 miles (12.52 km) of public roads in Morton, of which 0.83 miles (1.34 km) were maintained by the Pennsylvania Department of Transportation (PennDOT) and 6.95 miles (11.18 km) were maintained by the borough.

Pennsylvania Route 420 traverses Morton, following a southeast-to-northwest alignment following Woodland Avenue through the southwestern portion of the borough. PA 420 leads north 2.5 miles (4.0 km) to U.S. Route 1 in Springfield Township and south 3 miles (5 km) to Interstate 95 in Tinicum Township.

== Demographics ==
Historical population
Census	Pop.	Note	%±
1880	327		—
1890	821		151.1%
1900	889		8.3%
1910	1,071		20.5%
1920	1,212		13.2%
1930	1,341		10.6%
1940	1,316		−1.9%
1950	1,352		2.7%
1960	2,207		63.2%
1970	2,602		17.9%
1980	2,412		−7.3%
1990	2,851		18.2%
2000	2,715		−4.8%
2010	2,669		−1.7%
2020	2,778		4.1%

As of Census 2010, the racial makeup of the borough was 65.1% White, 25.4% African American, 0.3% Native American, 6.0% Asian, 0.6% from other races, and 2.7% from two or more races. Hispanic or Latino of any race were 2.2% of the population . The current mayor is Michele Roberts.

As of the census of 2000, there were 2,715 people, 1,145 households, and 687 families residing in the borough. The population density was 7,502.4 inhabitants per square mile (2,896.7/km^{2}). There were 1,209 housing units at an average density of 3,340.8 per square mile (1,289.9/km^{2}). The racial makeup of the borough was 69.87% White, 24.46% African American, 0.07% Native American, 3.90% Asian, 0.33% from other races, and 1.36% from two or more races. Hispanic or Latino of any race were 1.14% of the population.

There were 1,145 households, out of which 27.6% had children under the age of 18 living with them, 40.9% were married couples living together, 14.7% had a female householder with no husband present, and 40.0% were non-families. 34.6% of all households were made up of individuals, and 11.3% had someone living alone who was 65 years of age or older. The average household size was 2.36 and the average family size was 3.10.

In the borough the population was spread out, with 23.1% under the age of 18, 8.5% from 18 to 24, 32.2% from 25 to 44, 20.8% from 45 to 64, and 15.4% who were 65 years of age or older. The median age was 38 years. For every 100 females there were 88.7 males. For every 100 females age 18 and over, there were 85.7 males.

The median income for a household in the borough was $46,731, and the median income for a family was $64,271. Males had a median income of $38,720 versus $34,940 for females. The per capita income for the borough was $25,408. About 4.4% of families and 6.4% of the population were below the poverty line, including 4.4% of those under age 18 and 3.8% of those age 65 or over.

== History and prominent residents ==
Morton was named after Sketchley Morton, son of John Morton, a signatory of the Declaration of Independence and the delegate who cast the deciding vote in favor of American independence. In 1776, Morton became part of Ridley Township and Springfield Township.

The borough houses the Morton train station, built in 1880 by Joseph Wilson of the Wilson Brothers architectural firm to serve the Morton stop on the Pennsylvania Railroad West Chester line that originated in 1854. It is currently used on the SEPTA Regional Rail Media/Wawa Line.

The Piasecki Helicopter Corporation opened a manufacturing plant in Morton in 1947. The Piasecki H-21 and the Piasecki HUP-1 were both manufactured there. Boeing incorporated the company in 1960, and the company moved the manufacturing to a site along the Delaware River. The original Piasecki building is now a BJ's Wholesale Club, with the control tower on one corner.

Mike Scioscia, former Major League Baseball player with the Los Angeles Dodgers and former manager of the Los Angeles Angels, is a native of Morton.

== Education ==
Morton lies within the Springfield School District. The borough is served by Springfield Literacy Center (K-1), Sabold Elementary School (2-5), E.T. Richardson Middle School (6-8), and Springfield High School (9-12).

The former Sidney Smedley School is now the borough hall. It was constructed in 1914 and closed in June 1979.

Our Lady of Angels Regional School in Ridley Township, with a Morton postal address, is the area Catholic school. It formed in 2012 from a merger of Our Lady of Perpetual Help in Ridley Township and Our Lady of Fatima in Secane and in Ridley Township.

== Notable people ==
- Linda Hill-MacDonald (born 1948), basketball coach
