= Secane station =

Railway station in Secane, Pennsylvania

Secane
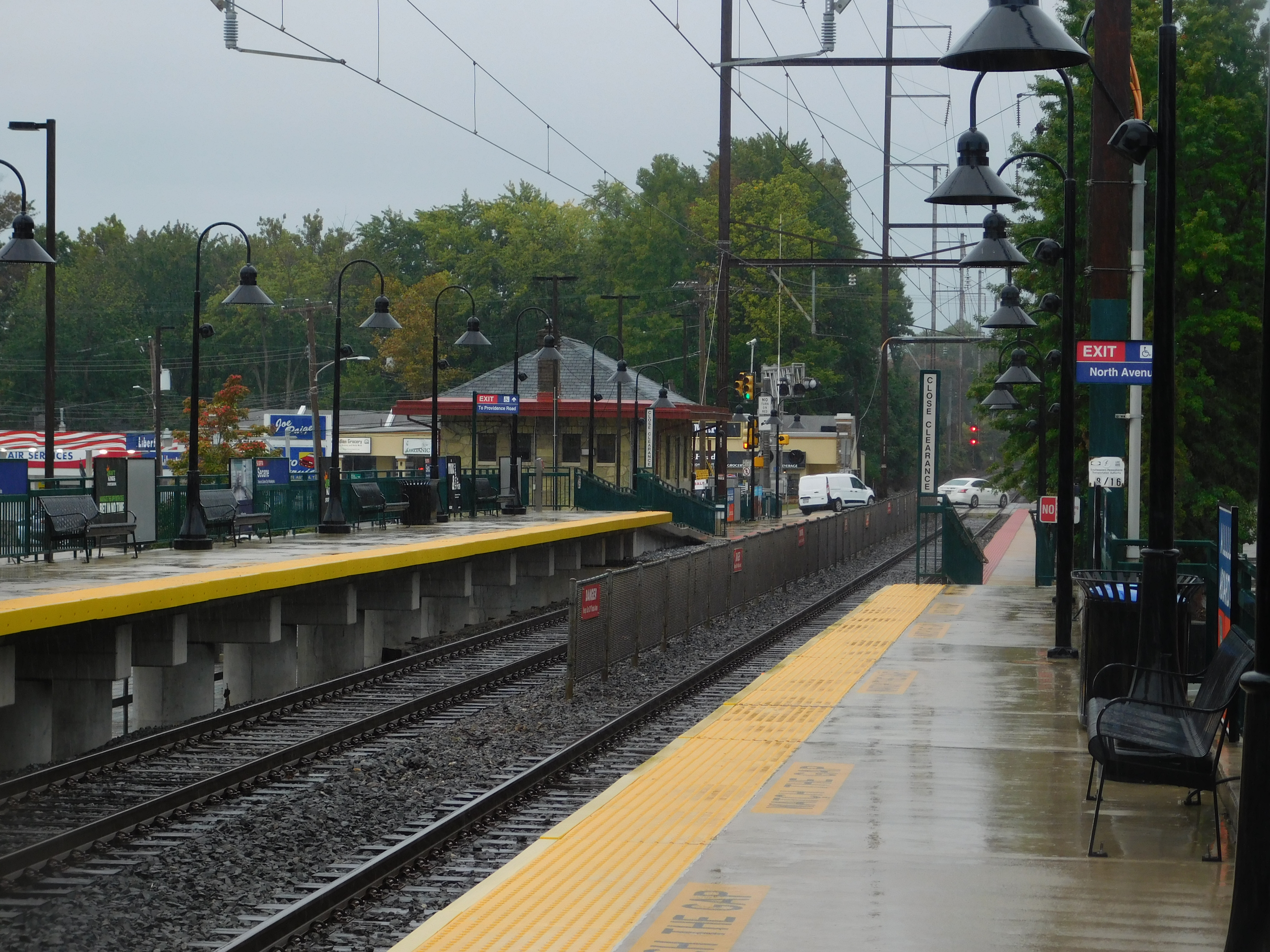
- Secane station after reconstruction in September 2020.

General information
- Location: 1297 Providence Road; Clifton Heights, Pennsylvania
- Coordinates: 39.91574°N 75.30986°W
- Owner: SEPTA
- Platforms: 2 side platforms
- Tracks: 2

Construction
- Parking: Yes
- Accessible: Yes

Other information
- Fare zone: 2

History
- Opened: 1880
- Electrified: December 2, 1928
- Former names: Spring Hill (–1886)

Passengers
- 2017: 564 boardings 499 alightings (weekday average)
- Rank: 42 of 146

Services
Preceding station	SEPTA	Following station
Morton toward Wawa Station	Media/Wawa Line	Primos toward Temple University
Former services
Preceding station	Pennsylvania Railroad	Following station
Morton toward West Chester	West Chester Line	Primos toward Suburban Station
Location

Secane station is a SEPTA Regional Rail station in Secane, Pennsylvania. It serves the Media/Wawa Line and previously served the Pennsylvania Railroad. It is located at Providence Road and South Avenue, and parking is available via permit.

The station consists of two platforms with shelters on the east side of Providence Road across from the end of South Street. A serpentinite stone building originally built in 1880 by the Pennsylvania Railroad serves as the station and ticket office, with an insurance office occupying the level at the parking lot. The station opened as Spring Hill, retaining that name until 1886. The previous name can still be found on the cornerstone of the building.

== Improvements ==
In September 2019 SEPTA completed a series of upgrades to this station. The upgrades include the installation high-level platforms and a new station building and canopy. The Secane station upgrade was made possible by funding provided by the Commonwealth's Act 89 funds.

== Station layout ==
Secane has two high-level side platforms.
