= Swarthmore station =

Railway station in Swarthmore, Pennsylvania

Swarthmore
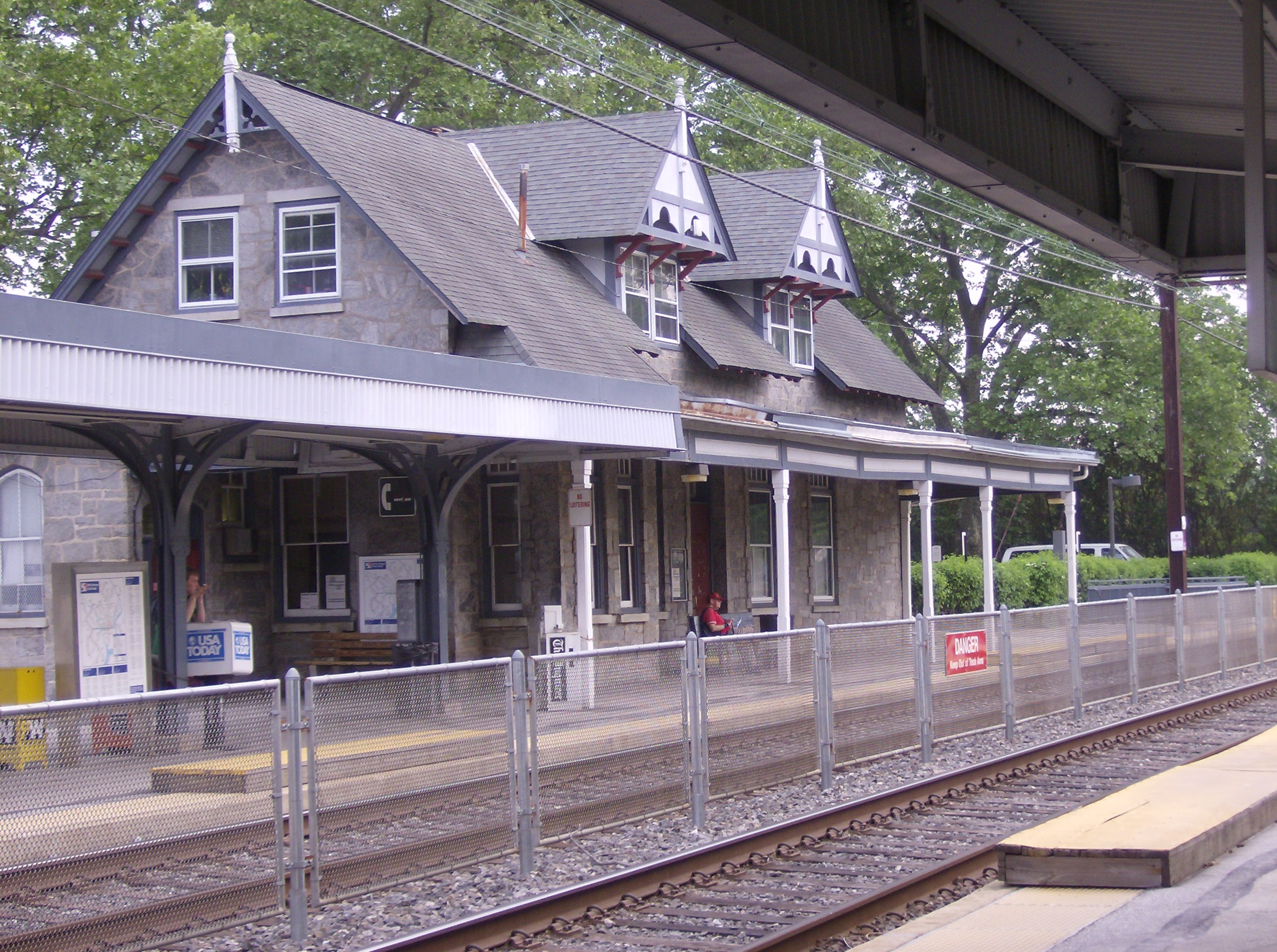

General information
- Location: 2 South Chester Road (PA 320); Swarthmore, Pennsylvania
- Coordinates: 39.902221°N 75.350985°W
- Owner: SEPTA
- Platforms: 2 side platforms
- Tracks: 2
- Connections: SEPTA Suburban Bus: 109

Construction
- Accessible: Yes

Other information
- Fare zone: 3

History
- Opened: October 19, 1854
- Electrified: December 2, 1928
- Former names: Westdale

Passengers
- 2017: 790 boardings 825 alightings (weekday average)
- Rank: 23 of 146

Services
Preceding station	SEPTA	Following station
Wallingford toward Wawa Station	Media/Wawa Line	Morton toward Temple University
Former services
Preceding station	Pennsylvania Railroad	Following station
Wallingford toward West Chester	West Chester Line	Morton toward Suburban Station
Location

Swarthmore station is a SEPTA Regional Rail station in Swarthmore, Pennsylvania. Located on Chester Road between downtown Swarthmore and Swarthmore College, it serves the Media/Wawa Line.

In 2013, this station saw 765 boardings and 699 alightings on an average weekday. Dollar-a-day parking and permit parking are available. It is the first outward-bound Zone 3 station from the central Philadelphia stations. It is the busiest station on the Media/Wawa Line outside of Center City. The adult fare to and from Central Philadelphia is currently $5 during off-peak hours, with an additional $2 surcharge assessed for those who buy a ticket on the train, regardless of whether the ticket window is open.

The ticket office is located on the inbound side of the tracks in a building used otherwise by Swarthmore College and the Chester Children's Chorus. The building was originally built in 1880 by the Pennsylvania Railroad and formerly held the Jumping Cow cafe. Swarthmore's main street, Chester Road, has passed under the station since 1931. Before Swarthmore College was opened, the station was known as Westdale.

== Station layout ==
Swarthmore has two low-level side platforms.

== Bibliography ==
- Westcott, Thompson (1875). The Official Guide Book to Philadelphia. A New Handbook for Strangers and Citizens. Philadelphia, Pennsylvania: Porter and Coates.
