= Morton station =

Railway station in Morton, Pennsylvania

Coordinates: 39.907904°N 75.328356°W

Morton
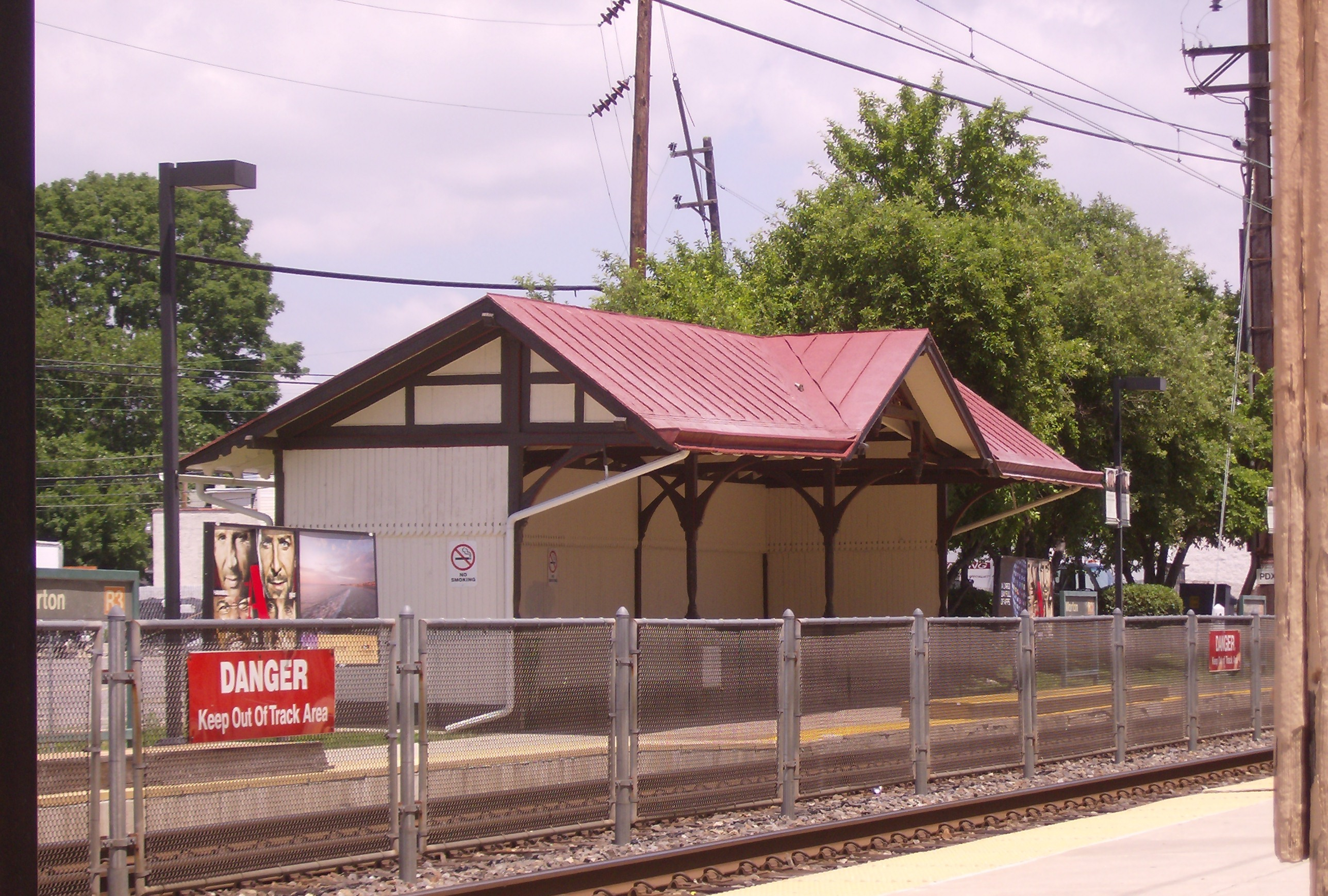
- Passenger shelter across from Morton station

General information
- Location: 2 South Morton Avenue; Morton, Pennsylvania
- Owner: SEPTA
- Platforms: 2 side platforms
- Tracks: 2
- Connections: SEPTA Suburban Bus: 107

Construction
- Parking: 252 free/30 with permits
- Cycle facilities: Yes (2 racks)
- Accessible: Yes

Other information
- Fare zone: 2

History
- Opened: 1867
- Rebuilt: 1880
- Electrified: December 2, 1928
- Former names: Morton–Rutledge

Passengers
- 2017: 612 boardings 693 alightings (weekday average)
- Rank: 38 of 146

Services
Preceding station	SEPTA	Following station
Swarthmore toward Wawa Station	Media/Wawa Line	Secane toward Temple University
Former services
Preceding station	Pennsylvania Railroad	Following station
Swarthmore toward West Chester	West Chester Line	Secane toward Suburban Station
Location

Morton station, also known as Morton–Rutledge station, is a SEPTA Regional Rail station in Morton, Pennsylvania. Located at Yale and Morton Avenues, it serves the Media/Wawa Line. While the south, inbound platform of the station is in Morton Borough, the north, outbound side is in Springfield Township. Both dollar-a-day and permit parking are available. In 2013, this station saw 720 boardings and 657 alightings on an average weekday.

== History ==
Morton Station was originally built in 1867 for the West Chester and Philadelphia Railroad. It was rebuilt in 1880 by architect Joseph Wilson of the Wilson Brothers architectural firm (although some have mistakenly credited the building to Frank Furness) for the Pennsylvania Railroad. The second station is believed to have been designed in a manner similar to that of Glen Mills, which is now owned by the West Chester Railroad. In 1892, PRR added a westbound passenger shelter. A former freight house built in 1879 exists 50 feet west of the station house, both of which are maintained by the Morton Station Preservation Committee.

On May 28, 2009, SEPTA approved a $2.6 million rehabilitation effort for Morton station.

== Station layout ==
Morton has two low-level side platforms.
