= Springfield Mall (Pennsylvania) =

Shopping mall in Delaware County, Pennsylvania

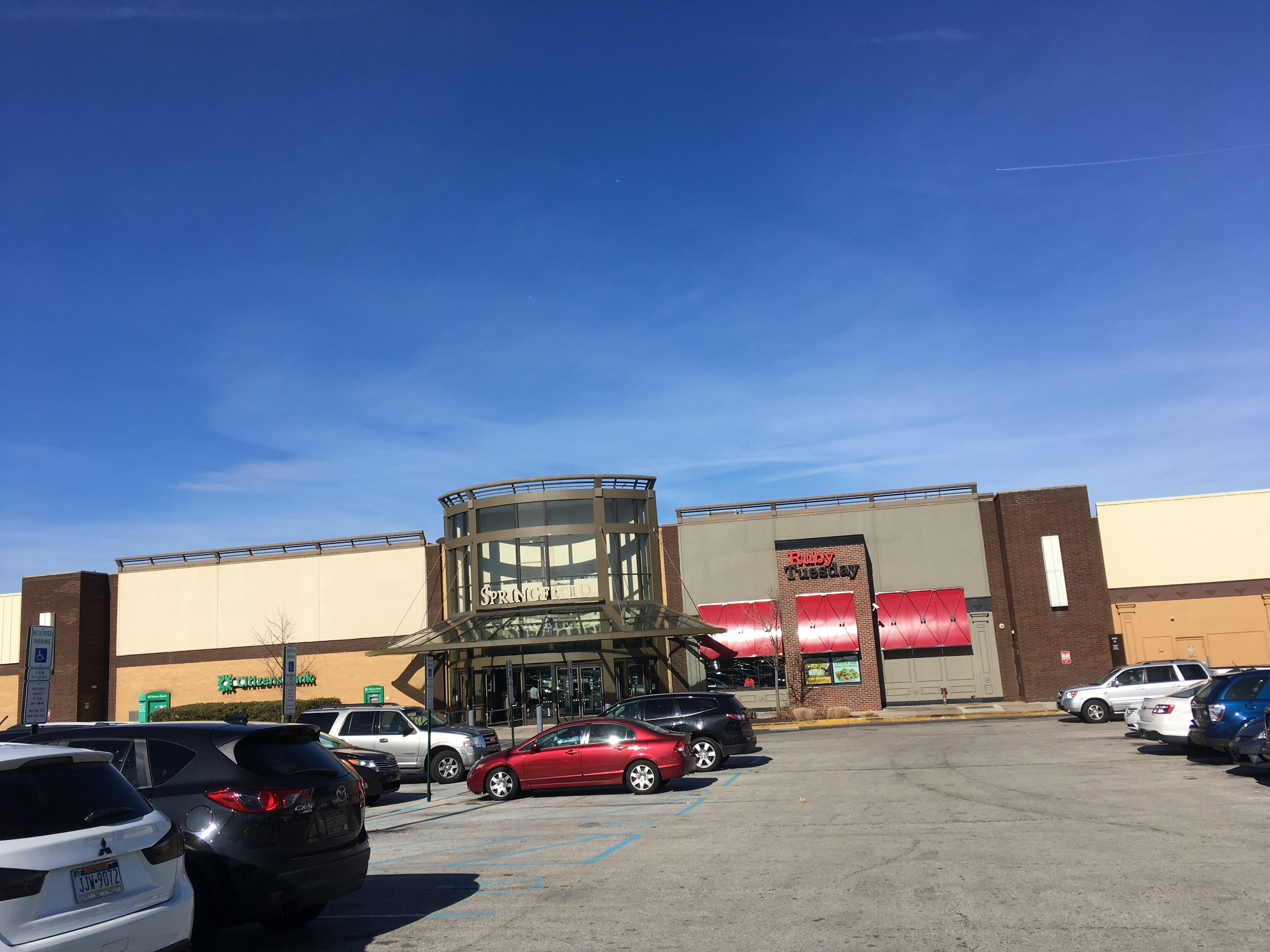
- South entrance to Springfield Mall
- Location: Springfield Township, Delaware County, Pennsylvania, U.S.
- Coordinates: 39.915°N 75.352°W
- Address: 1250 Baltimore Pike Springfield, PA 19064
- Opened: September 19, 1974; 52 years ago
- Developer: Springfield Associates
- Manager: Spinoso Real Estate Group
- Owner: Simon Property Group (50%); PREIT (50%)
- Num. of stores: 70+
- Num. of anchor tenants: 2
- Floor area: 589,000 square feet (54,700 m^{2})
- Floors: 2 (3 in Macy's)
- Parking: Lighted Lot
- Public transit: Springfield Mall: D1 SEPTA bus: 107, 109, 110
- Website: www.shopspringfieldmall.com

Springfield Mall is a 589,000-square-foot (54,700 m^{2}) regional shopping mall located approximately 10 miles (16 km) southwest of Philadelphia in Springfield Township, Delaware County, Pennsylvania. It is located just off Interstate 476 (the "Blue Route") along Baltimore Pike, near its busy intersection with Pennsylvania Route 320. It is serviced by a number of SEPTA bus lines as well as the SEPTA Metro D1 (former Media Line) at the Springfield Mall station. This is a rarity for suburban Philadelphia shopping malls as many of which are served solely by bus routes.

Springfield Mall is owned jointly by the Simon Property Group and PREIT (each with a 50% stake), and is managed by Spinoso Real Estate Group.

It is currently anchored by a 192,000 sq ft (17,800 m^{2}) Macy's and Target, the latter replacing a 186,000 sq ft (17,300 m^{2}) Strawbridge's anchor store.

== History ==
=== 20th century ===
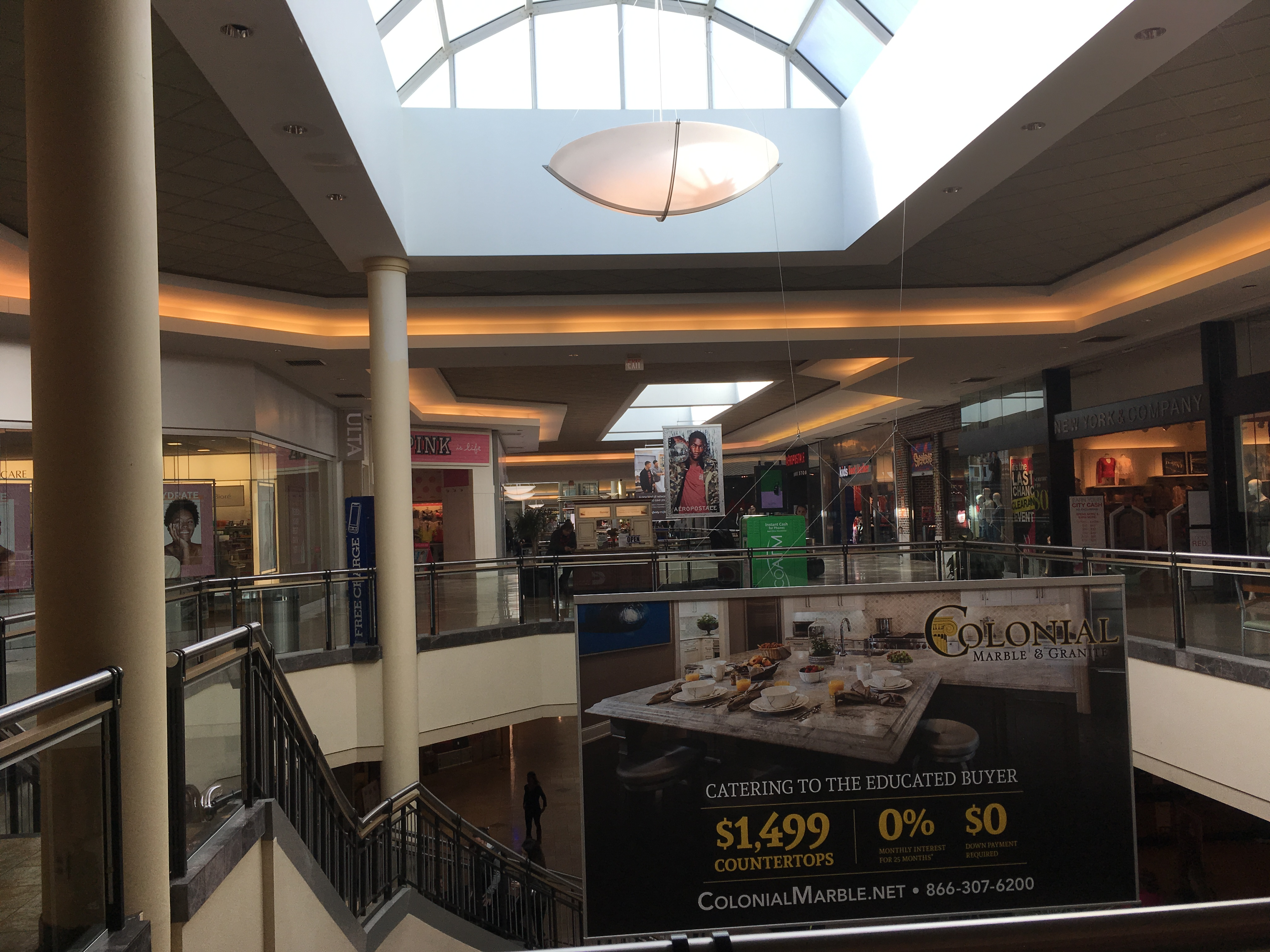
The second floor of Springfield Mall seen from Target

Springfield Mall opened on September 19, 1974, under the development of Springfield Associates. The original two anchor stores were Bamberger's and John Wanamaker's.

On October 30, 1985, a mass shooting occurred in the mall's parking lot and interior, killing three people and wounding seven others. The shooter, 25-year-old Sylvia Seegrist was disarmed by shopper John Laufer and later sentenced to life imprisonment.

Bamberger's was converted to a Macy's in 1986. John Wanamaker closed in 1995 and was reopened as Hecht's the same year. In 1997, the Hecht's was converted to Strawbridge's.

=== 21st century ===
In 2005, PREIT and Kravco Simon acquired the Springfield Mall from Springfield Associates LP for $103.5 million.

Strawbridge's closed in 2006 following the sale of its parent company to the same parent company as Macy's. The building was sold to Target in 2008 and demolished fall 2008. The new Target was constructed following the Strawbridge's demolition and opened on October 11, 2009, coexisting with the nearby Target store opened in 1997 in a former Strawbridge's, the area's first Target.

== Current anchor stores ==
- Macy's (Since 1986)
- Target (Since 2009)

== Former anchor stores ==
- Bamberger's (1974-1986, now Macy's)
- John Wanamaker (1974-1995, later Hecht's)
- Hecht's (1995-1997, later Strawbridge's)
- Strawbridge's (1997-2006, demolished in fall 2008/rebuilt as Target in December 2008 until September 2009)
