= Springfield Township, Delaware County, Pennsylvania =

Township in Pennsylvania, US

- Township
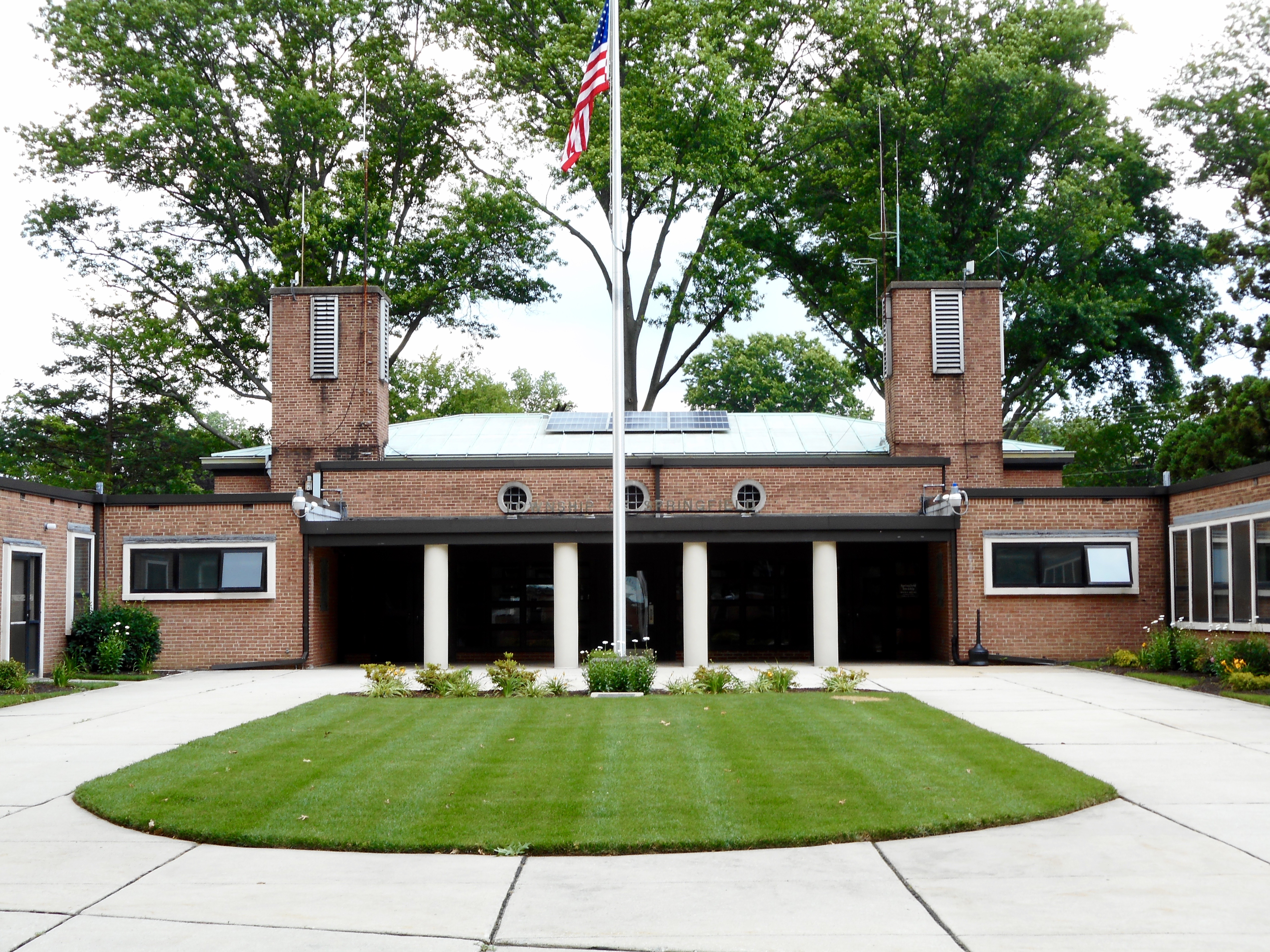
- Municipal Building

- Location in Delaware County and the state of Pennsylvania.

- Location of Pennsylvania in the United States
- Coordinates: 39°56′00″N 75°19′59″W
- Country: United States
- State: Pennsylvania
- County: Delaware
- Founded: 1686

Area
  - Total: 6.34 sq mi (16.42 km^{2})
  - Land: 6.32 sq mi (16.37 km^{2})
  - Water: 0.019 sq mi (0.05 km^{2})
- Elevation: 243 ft (74 m)

Population (2020)
  - Total: 25,070
  - Estimate (2022): 24,842
  - Density: 3,966.2/sq mi (1,531.34/km^{2})
- Time zone: UTC-5 (EST)
  - Summer (DST): UTC-4 (EDT)
- ZIP code: 19064
- Area code: 610, 484, and 835
- FIPS code: 42-045-73032
- GNIS feature ID: 1216391
- Website: www.springfielddelco.org

Springfield Township, or simply Springfield, is a township in Delaware County in the U.S. state of Pennsylvania. The population was 25,070 at the 2020 census. Springfield is a suburb of Philadelphia, located about 4 miles (6.4 km) west of the city.

== History ==
First settled by Quakers who arrived in Pennsylvania with William Penn, Springfield was first recognized as a governmental entity in 1686. Many of the streets in Springfield are named after former prominent citizens, including Kennerly, Lownes, Levis, Maris, Thomas, Beatty, Lewis, Foulke, Evans, Powell, Pancoast, Worrell, and Edge. Originally, Springfield was primarily a farming town.

On December 9, 1687, the settlers began laying the road to Amosland as it was then called. This road is now known as Springfield Road. In 1701 construction began on the Baltimore Pike; the road was formed of sturdy oak planks, some of which still exist under the current Baltimore Pike. 1701 also marked the year that construction began on the first Quaker meeting house. The meeting house burned in 1737 and was rebuilt. The current meeting house that stands in its spot was constructed in 1851.

By the date of the signing of the Declaration of Independence in 1776, it is estimated from tax records that about 300 people resided in Springfield.

By the 19th century, Springfield had become more industrialized. Taking advantage of its many creeks for power, the inhabitants erected many mills. Well-known mill owners included William Fell, Samuel Pancoast, William Beatty, Samuel Levis, and Moses and Emanuel Hey.

At the beginning of the 20th century, Springfield's Baltimore Pike had become a busy commercial area. The long, straight stretch of Baltimore Pike in the township was referred to as "The Golden Mile", commonly known for its many automobile dealerships. Residents are currently attempting to undo the emblematic effects of urban sprawl along the mile through the implementation of green initiatives, responsible traffic planning, and zoning improvements.

In the past century, all of Springfield's farmland was slowly bought up by developers who turned Springfield into the town it is today, that is, largely comprising developments of standard suburban single-family homes. One of the largest single developments was the Stoney Creek development. Construction began in 1949 and was completed in only five years. The huge development stretched from West Avenue to Providence Road and ran all the way up to Baltimore Pike. Over 75 homes were constructed in the development. Similar to most housing developments of their time, no two houses in Stoney Creek were built exactly the same. While all resemble each other with their stone fronts and common size, additional luxuries such as porches and window placement were available for purchase to make each one slightly individualized.

Though all of the farmland of Springfield's past is gone, many of the woods and fields of the past still remain standing today in some of the many parks located throughout the community.

The bulk of Springfield's history lies recorded in the archives of the Heritage Society of Springfield, and the Springfield Township Public Library (a member of the Delaware County Library System).

Springfield has three sister cities, Lisbon, Portugal, Lima, Peru, and Vancouver, Canada.

== Geography ==
Springfield is located in eastern Delaware County at 39°55′37″N 75°20′7″W (39.926961, -75.335231). According to the United States Census Bureau, the township has a total area of 6.34 square miles (16.42 km^{2}), of which 6.32 square miles (16.37 km^{2}) is land and 0.02 square miles (0.05 km^{2}), or 0.28%, is water. The northeastern border of the township is formed by Darby Creek, and the western border is formed by Crum Creek, both of which flow south to the Delaware River. Note that there are multiple Springfield townships in Pennsylvania (e.g., in Bucks County, Delaware County, Montgomery County, and in York County).

=== Climate ===
Springfield has a humid subtropical climate (Cfa) and the hardiness zone is 7a. Average monthly temperatures in the vicinity of the library range from 32.6 °F (0.3 °C) in January to 77.7 °F (25.4 °C) in July.

=== Adjacent municipalities ===
- Haverford Township, Delaware County - north
- Upper Darby Township, Delaware County - east
- Ridley Township, Delaware County - south
- Morton Borough, Delaware County - south
- Swarthmore Borough, Delaware County - southwest. (A small exclave of Springfield Township is located south of Swarthmore Boro (see map to right)).
- Nether Providence Township, Delaware County - southwest
- Marple Township, Delaware County - northwest

== Demographics ==
Historical population
Census	Pop.	Note	%±
1930	4,589		—
1940	5,488		19.6%
1950	10,917		98.9%
1960	26,733		144.9%
1970	29,006		8.5%
1980	25,326		−12.7%
1990	24,160		−4.6%
2000	23,677		−2.0%
2010	24,211		2.3%
2020	25,070		3.5%
U.S. Decennial Census

As of 2010 census, the racial makeup of the township was 93.4% White, 1.7% African American, 0.1% Native American, 3.8% Asian, 0.2% from other races, and 0.8% from two or more races. Hispanic or Latino of any race were 1.1% of the population.

As of the 2000 census, there were 23,677 people, 8,618 households, and 6,790 families residing in the township. The population density was 3,723.0 inhabitants per square mile (1,437.5/km^{2}). There were 8,800 housing units at an average density of 1,383.7 units per square mile (534.2 units/km^{2}). The racial makeup of the township was 94.6% White, 0.5% African American, 0.05% Native American, 4.2% Asian, 0.01% Pacific Islander, 0.12% from other races, and 0.54% from two or more races. Hispanic or Latino of any race were 1.65% of the population.

There were 8,618 households, out of which 32.7% had children under the age of 18 living with them, 67.3% were married couples living together, 8.6% had a female householder with no husband present, and 21.2% were non-families. 19.3% of all households were made up of individuals, and 11.9% had someone living alone who was 65 years of age or older. The average household size was 2.73 and the average family size was 3.14.

In the township, the population was spread out, with 24.0% under the age of 18, 6.2% from 18 to 24, 25.0% from 25 to 44, 24.5% from 45 to 64, and 20.3% who were 65 years of age or older. The median age was 42 years. For every 100 females there were 91.8 males. For every 100 females age 18 and over, there were 88.4 males.

The median income for a household in the township was $89,019, and the median income for a family was $103,424. Males had a median income of $64,830 versus $50,651 for females. The per capita income for the township was $35,231. About 1.7% of families and 3.4% of the population were below the poverty line, including 5.3% of those under age 18 and 6.7% of those age 65 or over.

=== Religion ===
Catholic churches in Springfield Township include Holy Cross Church, St. Francis of Assisi Church, and St. Kevin Church. In 2014 the archdiocese asked the churches to produce documents about their future viability as other Delaware County Catholic churches had closed permanently around that time period. In 2015 the archdiocese stated that, at the time, all three would continue to operate.

== Economy ==
The township is home to Springfield Mall, a 590,000-square-foot (55,000 m^{2}), two-level shopping mall. One of the first of several suburban locations of Strawbridge & Clothier, opened in 1964, was located in Springfield. The old Strawbridge & Clothier has since been reconstructed into a Target.

== Education ==
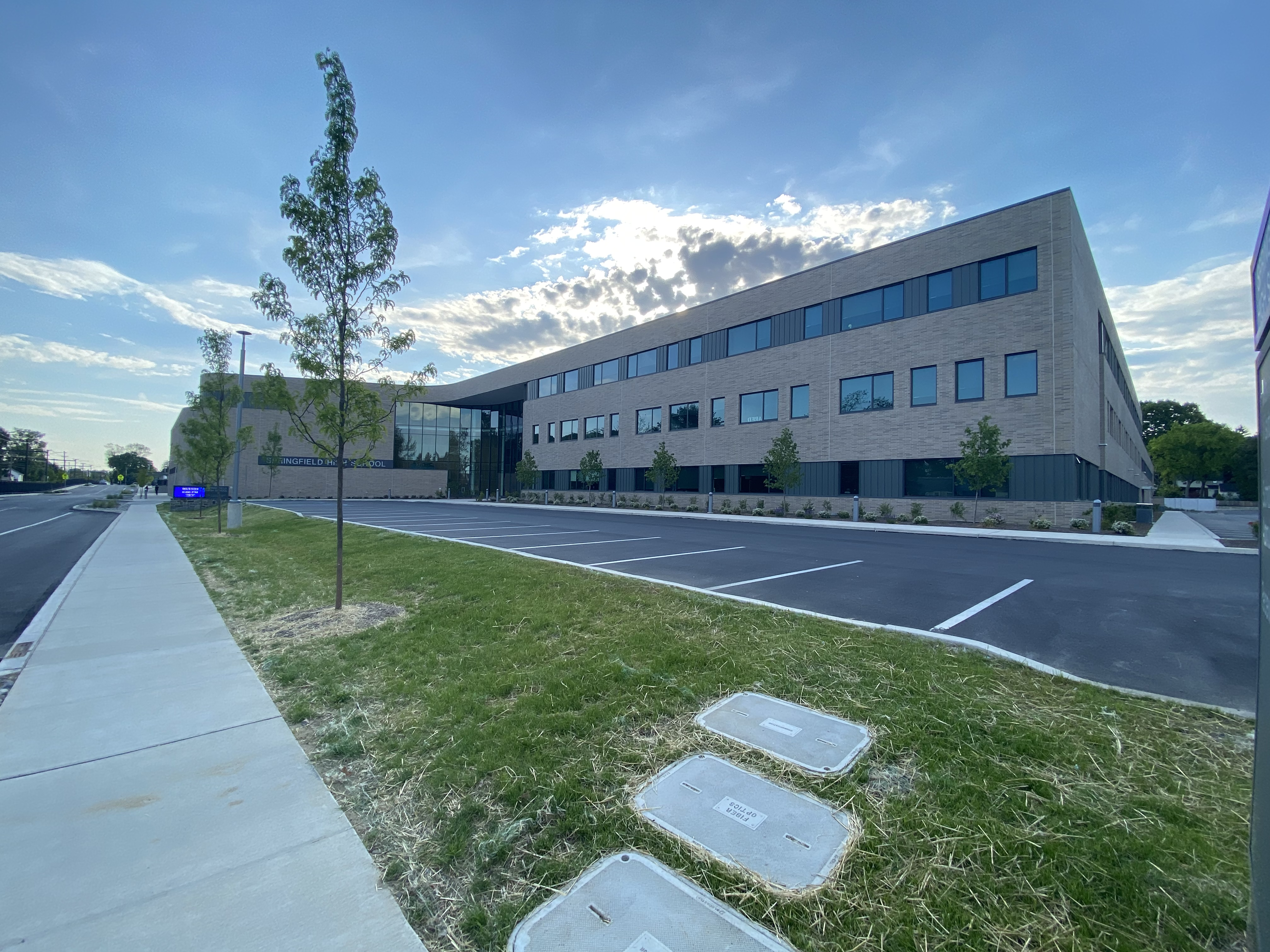
Springfield High School

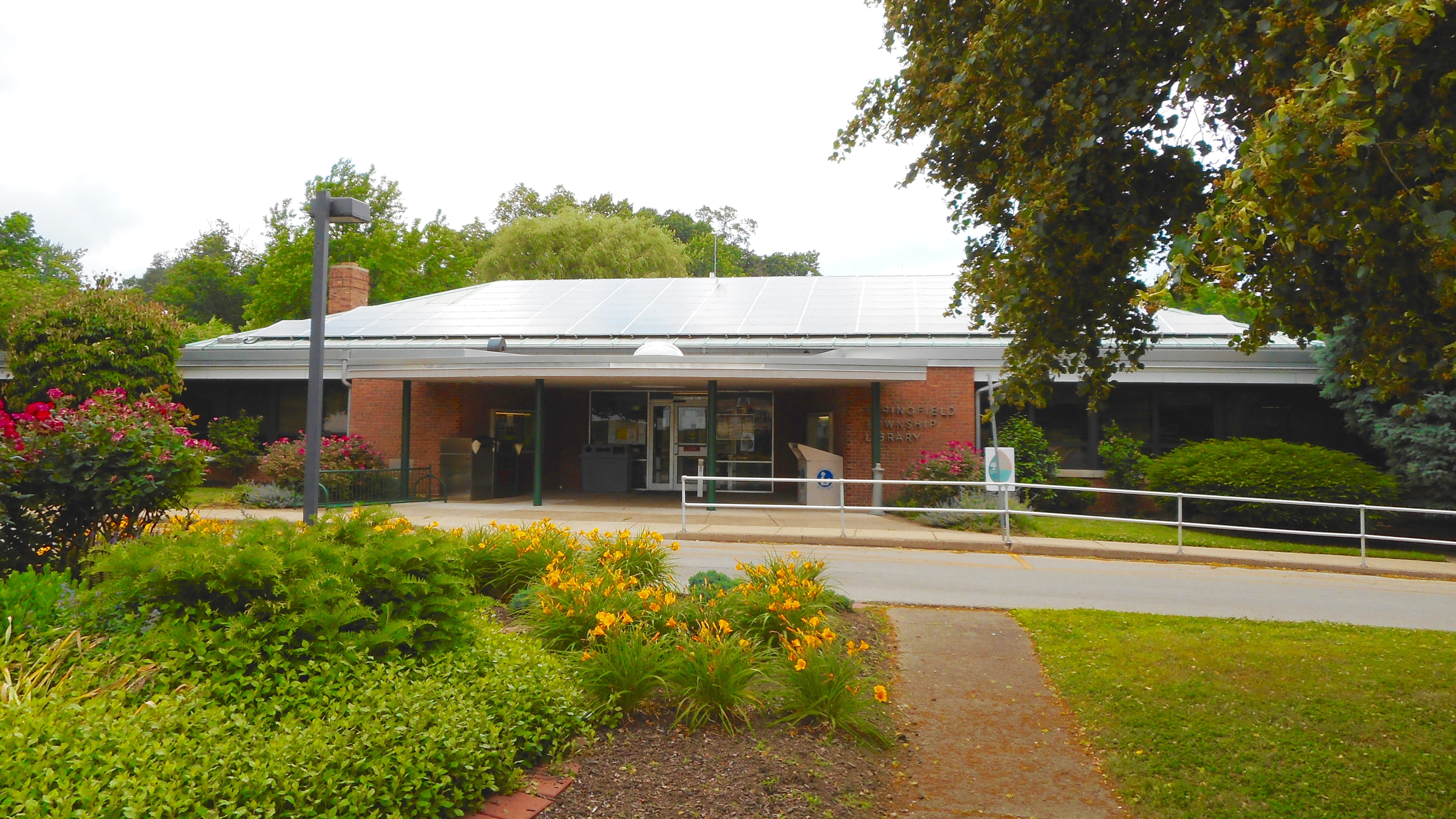
Springfield Township Library

Students in Springfield Township attend schools in the Springfield School District. This is not to be confused with the Springfield Township School District, which is located in Springfield Township, Montgomery County.

=== Public schools ===
- Springfield Literacy Center - all kindergarten and first grade students in the school district
- Scenic Hills School - students in grades 2 through 5 - enrollment based on geographic proximity
- Harvey C. Sabold School - students in grades 2 through 5 - enrollment based on geographic proximity
- E. T. Richardson Middle School - all students in grades 6, 7, and 8 in the school district (approximately 1,000 students)
- Springfield High School - all students in grades 9 through 12 in the school district (approximately 1,200 students)
  - A new high school was completed and opened in 2021.

Families in Springfield Township could choose to send their children to Swarthmore High, Lansdowne High School, or Media High School prior to the 1931 establishment of Springfield High School.

=== Private and parochial schools ===
- Holy Cross - Catholic grade school - students in grades K-8
- St. Francis of Assisi - Catholic grade school - students in grades K-8
- Cardinal O'Hara High School - students in grades 9–12

St. Kevin School, another Catholic grade school, operated from 1967 until 2011. The archdiocese closed it due to declining enrollment despite advocacy from community members to keep it open. It had 158 students in spring 2011, with parents stating that the number scheduled to attend in the fall of that year was over 130 while the archdiocese stated that number was 93. It was one of three Catholic schools in Delaware County to close at that time.

== Transportation ==
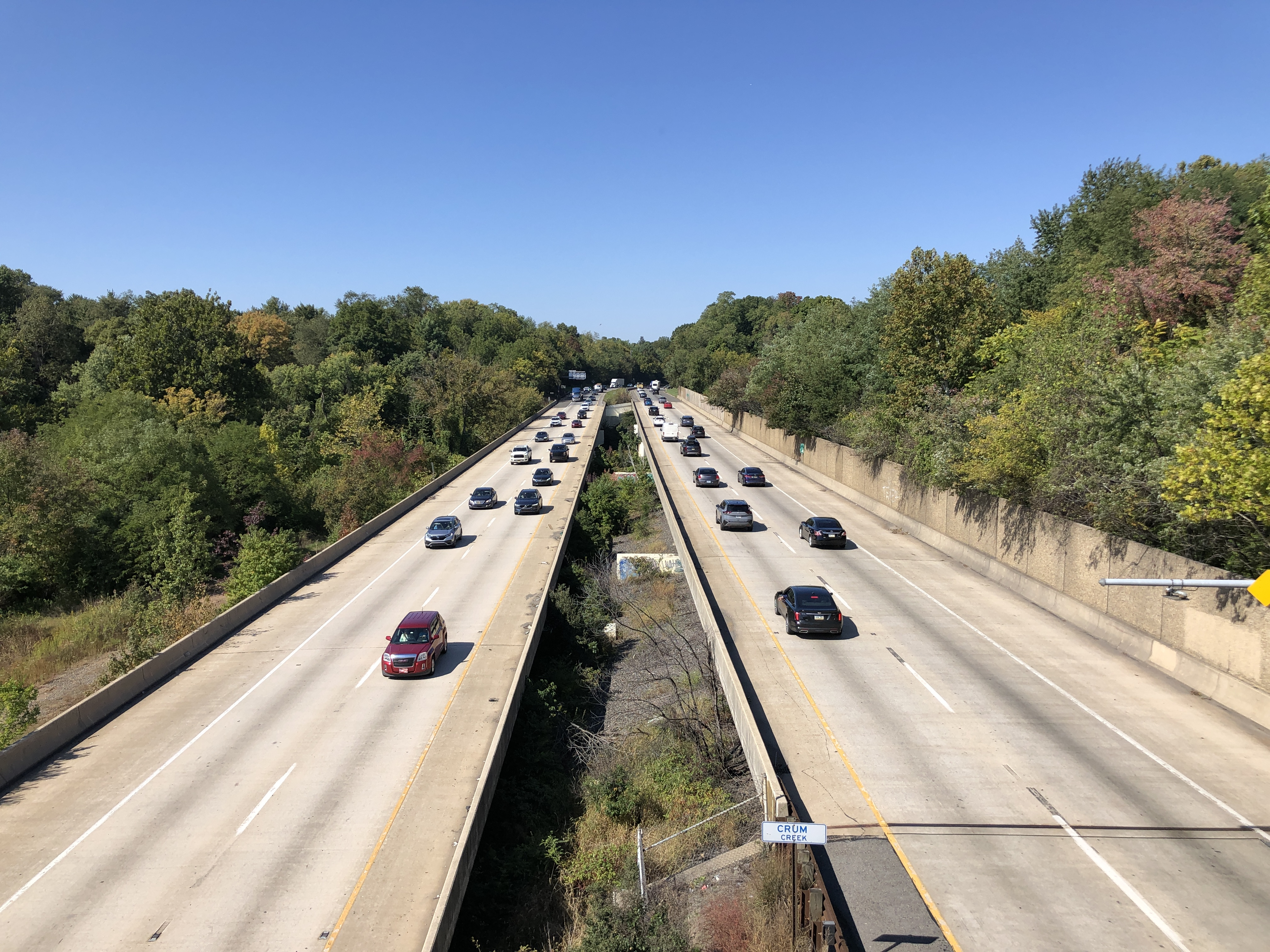
I-476 "Blue Route" northbound in Springfield Township

As of 2018, there were 84.34 miles (135.73 km) of public roads in Springfield Township, of which 16.80 miles (27.04 km) were maintained by Pennsylvania Department of Transportation (PennDOT) and 67.54 miles (108.70 km) were maintained by the township.

Interstate 476 is the most prominent highway traversing Springfield Township, brushing the western edge of the township on a north–south alignment. U.S. Route 1 follow State Road along a southwest–northeast alignment through the northern portion of the township. Pennsylvania Route 320 follows Chester Road and Sproul Road along a north–south alignment across the western portion of the township to the east of I-476. Finally, Pennsylvania Route 420 begins at PA 320 south of US 1 and heads southeastward along Woodland Avenue through central and southeastern portions of the township.

SEPTA operates public transportation in Springfield Township. SEPTA's light rail Media–Sharon Hill Line between 69th Street Transportation Center and Media serves the township with multiple stations. SEPTA provides Suburban Bus service to Springfield Township along routes 107, 109, 110, and 111, serving points of interest in the township and offering connections to 69th Street Transportation Center and other suburbs. SEPTA Regional Rail's Media/Wawa Line passes through the southern portion of Springfield Township, with the nearest stations at Swarthmore and Morton.

== Notable people ==
- Mark Alburger, composer
- Bill Carpenter, West Point "Lonesome End", U.S. Army lieutenant general, recipient of Distinguished Service Cross
- Pat Croce, entrepreneur, sports team executive and owner
- J. Edgar Thomson, third president of the Pennsylvania Railroad
- Joey DeFrancesco, jazz organist
- Robert W. Edgar, U.S. Congressman
- Robert Hazard, rock musician
- Tom Keifer, rock musician in the band Cinderella
- Al Martino, singer, film actor
- Geoff Petrie, NBA Rookie of the Year, 1971
- John Pinette, actor and comedian
- Skip Roderick, former pro soccer player and men's soccer coach at Elizabethtown College
- Mike Scioscia, MLB catcher LA Dodgers and World Series winning manager LA Angels
- Joe Sestak, Three Star (Vice) Admiral (retired 2005) and U.S. Congressman
- Benjamin West, painter
- Lawrence G. Williams, U.S. Congressman
- Kyle Sweeney, former pro lacrosse player and gold medalist

== Notable buildings ==
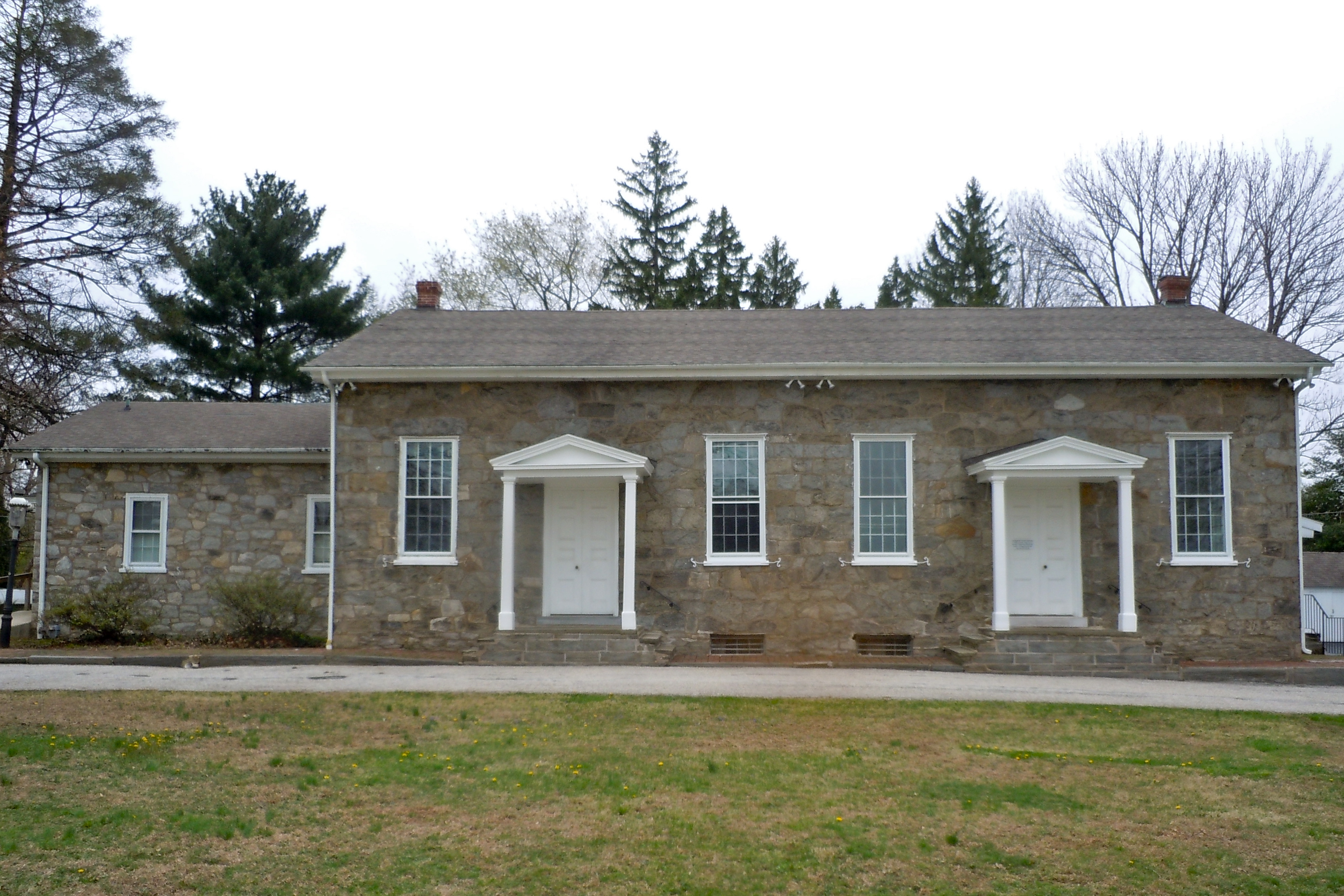
Springfield Friends Meetinghouse (founded 1686, this building 1851)

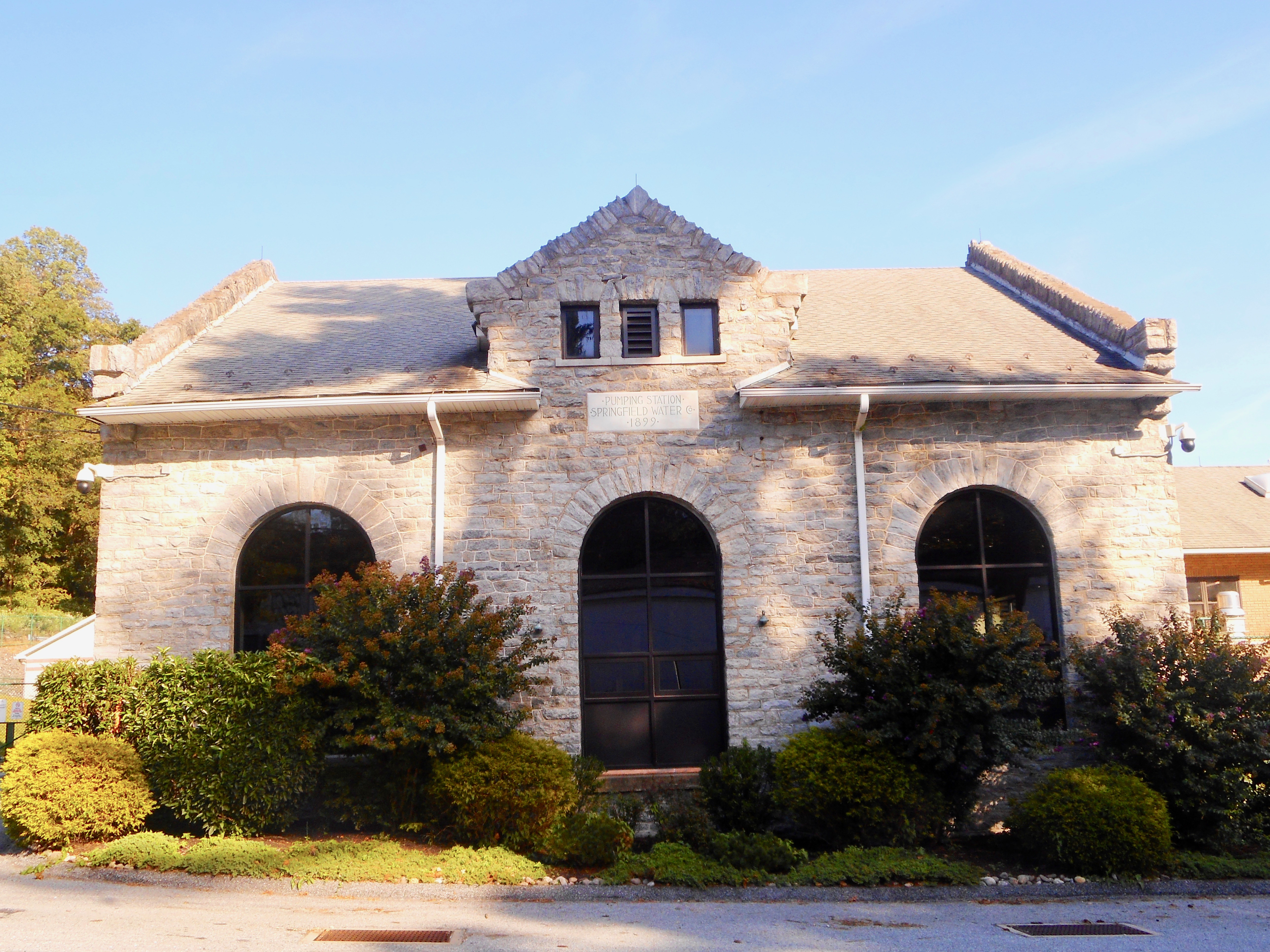
Springfield Water Company pumping station, built 1899

- Central School
- First Presbyterian Church
- Holy Cross Church
- The Old Central School House
- Springfield Library
- Springfield Water Pump House (1899)
- Springfield Mall
- The Springfield Literacy Center (2011)
- Springfield Friends Meeting House
- St. Francis of Assisi Church
- Blue Church

== Notable parks ==
There are 24 parks located in Springfield Township, some of the more notable parks are listed below.

- Veterans Memorial Park
- Williams Park (former Powell Road Park)
- Jane Lownes Park
- Indian Rock Park
- Meadowgreen Park
- Halderman Field
- Netherwood Park
- Walsh Park
- Rolling Green Park
- Crowell Park
- Elson Glen Park
