= Glen Riddle station =

Railway station in Middletown Township, Pennsylvania

Glen Riddle
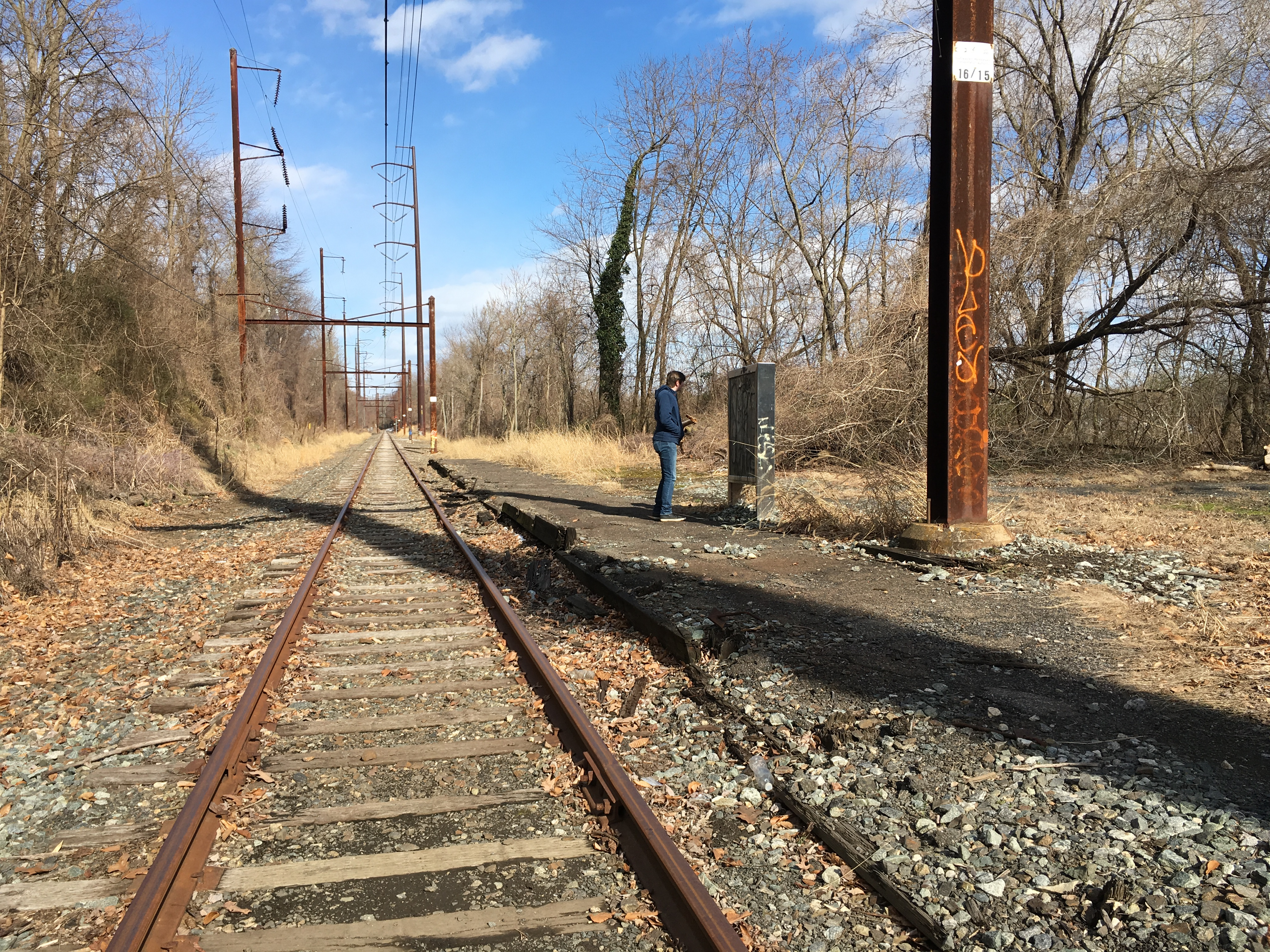
- Former Glen Riddle station site in March 2017.

General information
- Location: Pennell Road (PA 452), Middletown Township, Pennsylvania 19063
- Coordinates: 39.8967°N 75.4363°W
- System: Former SEPTA Regional Rail station
- Owner: SEPTA
- Line: West Chester Line
- Platforms: 1 side platform
- Tracks: 1 (formerly 2)

Construction
- Structure type: demolished

History
- Opened: February 1, 1856
- Closed: September 19, 1986
- Electrified: December 2, 1928

Key dates
- December 7, 1983: Station depot burns

Former services
Preceding station	SEPTA	Following station
Lenni toward West Chester	West Chester Line	Williamson School toward Suburban Station
Preceding station	Pennsylvania Railroad	Following station
Lenni toward West Chester	West Chester Line	Williamson School toward Suburban Station
Location

Glen Riddle is a defunct commuter railroad station in the Glen Riddle section of Middletown Township, Delaware County, Pennsylvania. Located next to the bridge of Pennell Road (State Route 452), the station formerly served trains of SEPTA Regional Rail's R3 West Chester service. Glen Riddle station consisted of a single low-level side platform on the inbound side of the tracks. SEPTA operates trains on the line to nearby Wawa Station, but they bypass the site of Glen Riddle station.

Railroad service to the area began with an extension of the West Chester and Philadelphia Railroad from Media to what was then-known as Rockdale on February 1, 1856. Rockdale served as the western terminus of the railroad for only eight months, when the line was extended to Lenni on September 22, 1856. The former Pennsylvania Railroad station depot, built in 1870, and was abandoned for several years, caught fire on the morning of December 7, 1983, resulting in the death of a woman who lived in the apartment on the second floor. SEPTA service at Glen Riddle ended on September 19, 1986 when they stopped service west of Elwyn station to West Chester. SEPTA re-introduced service to Wawa on August 21, 2022, but the intermediate stops at Glen Riddle, Lenni and Williamson School were not revived.

== History and architectural features ==
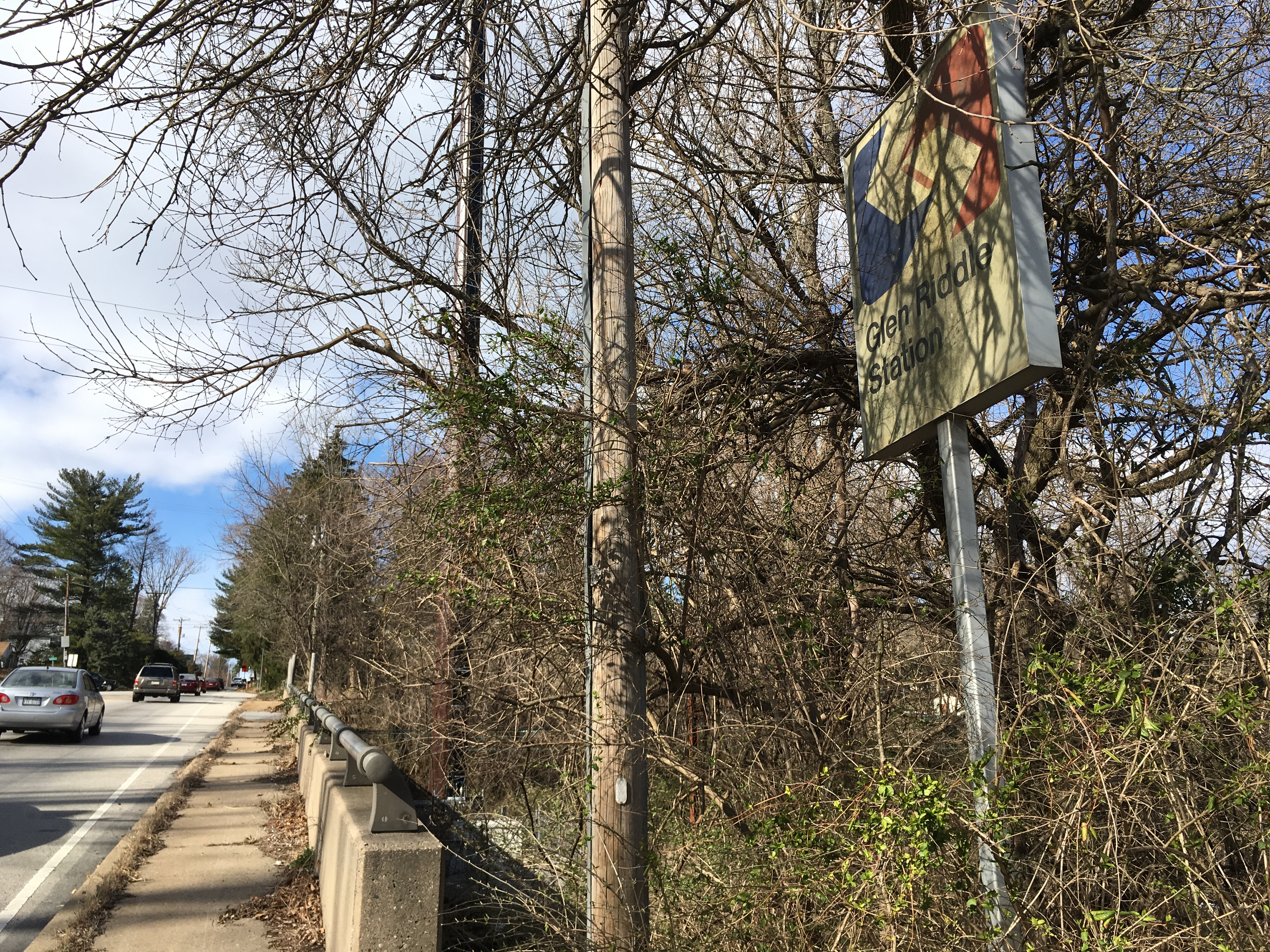
SEPTA lollipop sign for the former Glen Riddle station in 2017

The Pennsylvania Railroad depot at Glen Riddle caught fire on the morning of December 7, 1983. The fire started in the abandoned ticket office on the first floor of the depot, where a furnace was standing. The structure was fully engulfed by the time fire brigades arrived around 3:40 a.m. After they put out the fire, they found the body of Lillian Morris in her apartment on the second floor of the 1870 station depot. She was declared dead at 4:00 a.m. Morris' brother and roommate, Herbert Warnick, had been a patient at Riddle Memorial Hospital and not present during the fire. SEPTA was unsure what would happen with the station depot, and that despite the fire, trains would continue to stop at Glen Riddle station while they determine the disposal of the charred building.

The station, along with all of those west of Elwyn, was closed in September 1986, due to deteriorating track conditions and Chester County's desire to expand facilities at Exton station on SEPTA's Paoli/Thorndale Line. Service was "temporarily suspended" at that time, with substitute bus service provided.

The Glen Riddle station still appears in publicly posted tariffs.

The asphalt platform and access road survives. Resumption of SEPTA service to Wawa Station did not include an intermediate stop at Glen Riddle, although the service restoration project provides for construction of a new station if demand warrants.
