= Williamson School station =

Railway station in Middletown Township, Pennsylvania

Williamson School
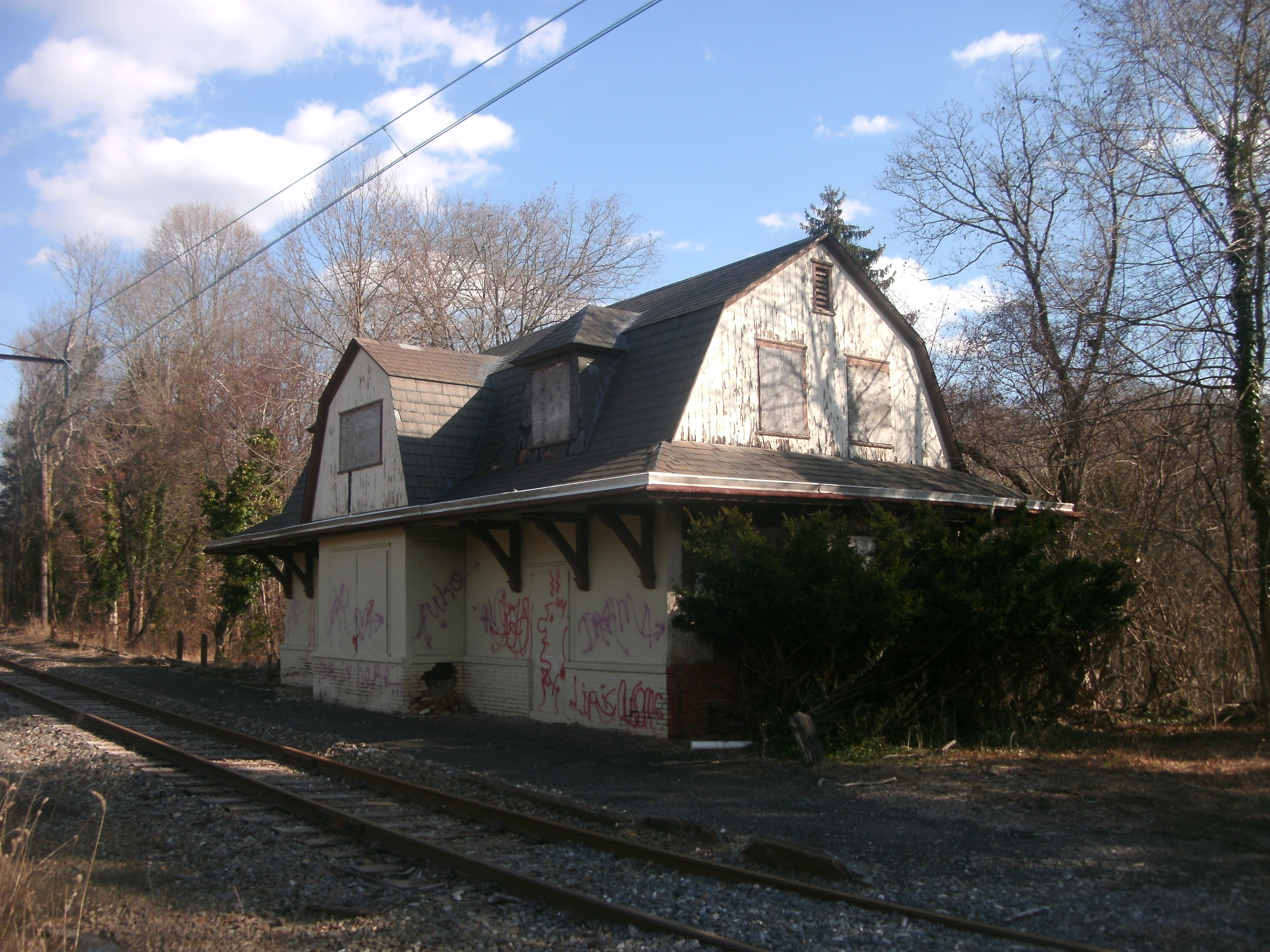
- Former Williamson School station site in January 2013.

General information
- Location: Station Drive, Middletown Township, Pennsylvania 19063
- Coordinates: 39.9029°N 75.4234°W
- System: Former SEPTA Regional Rail station
- Owner: SEPTA
- Line: West Chester Line
- Platforms: 1 side platform
- Tracks: 1

History
- Opened: 1888
- Closed: September 19, 1986
- Electrified: December 2, 1928

Former services
Preceding station	SEPTA	Following station
Glen Riddle toward West Chester	West Chester Line	Elwyn toward Suburban Station
Preceding station	Pennsylvania Railroad	Following station
Glen Riddle toward West Chester	West Chester Line	Elwyn toward Suburban Station
Location

Williamson School is an abandoned train station located on Station Drive near New Middletown Road in Middletown Township, Pennsylvania. The station was a stop on the Pennsylvania Railroad's West Chester Line. It later became a part of SEPTA's R3 West Chester.

The station, and all of those west of Elwyn, was closed in September 1986, due to deteriorating track conditions and Chester County's desire to expand facilities at Exton station on SEPTA's Paoli/Thorndale Line. Service was "temporarily suspended" at that time, with substitute bus service provided. Williamson School station still appears in publicly posted tariffs.

The original station is located on the grounds of the Williamson College of the Trades, serving primarily students and faculty. SEPTA service to Wawa Station does not include an intermediate stop at Williamson School, although the service restoration project provides for construction of a new station if demand warrants.
