= Lenni =

Lenni may refer to:

- Lenni, Pennsylvania, an unincorporated community in Middletown Township, Delaware County, Pennsylvania
  - Lenni station, abandoned train station of Lenni
- Lenni Brenner (born 1937), American Marxist writer
- Lenni Jabour, Canadian singer-songwriter based in France
- Nanticoke Lenni-Lenape Tribal Nation, a state-recognized tribe in New Jersey
- Yang Jeongin, a member of the K-Pop group Stray Kids
