= Media Station =

Media Station may refer to:

- Media Station (American company), a defunct video game developer
- Media Station (Japanese company), a defunct adult video company
- Media station (SEPTA), a SEPTA train station in Media, Pennsylvania
- Media–Orange Street station, a SEPTA trolley station in Media, Pennsylvania
