= Promenade at Granite Run =

Mixed-use development in Pennsylvania, US

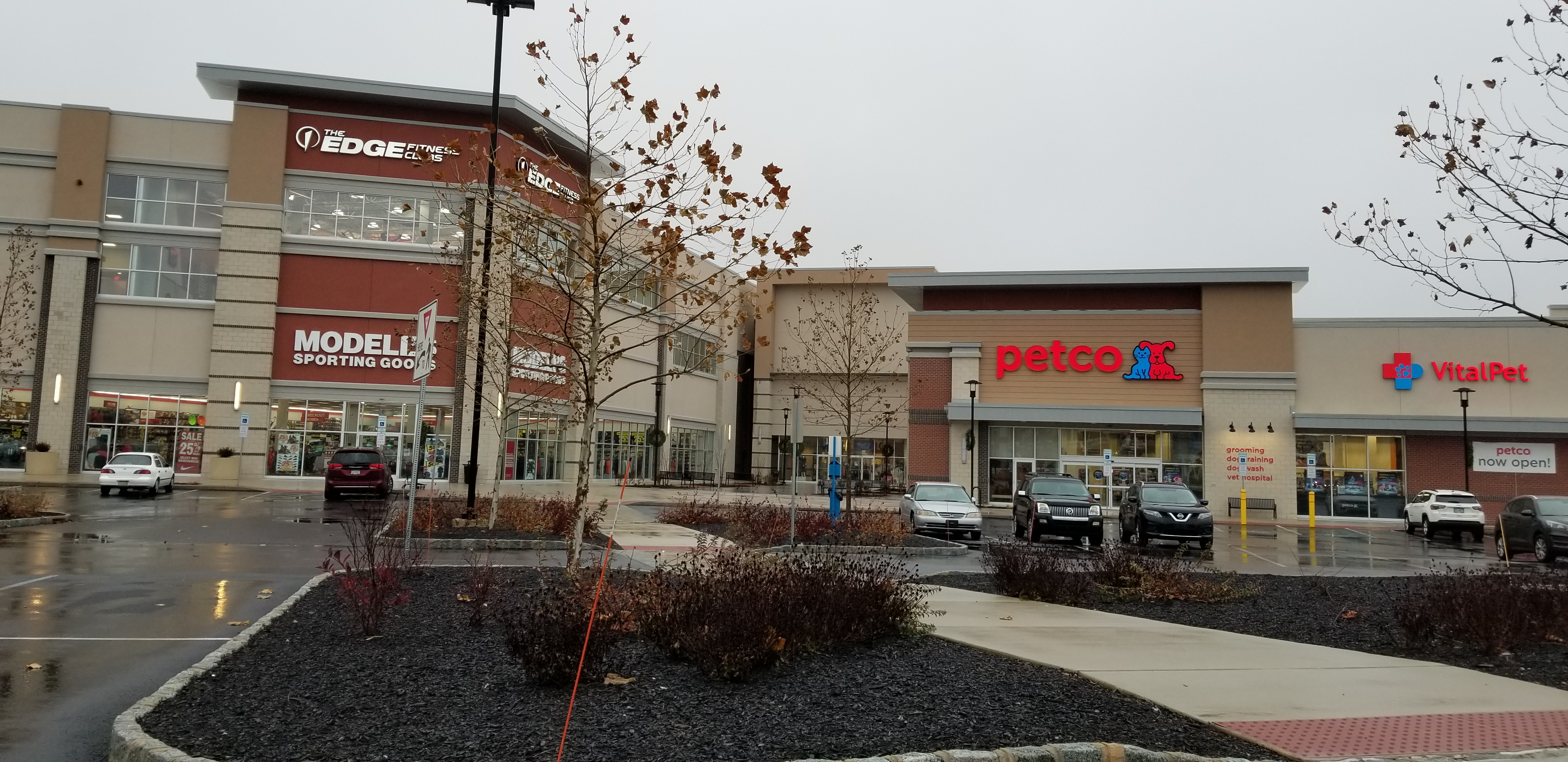
- Exterior view (December 2019)
- Location: Media, Pennsylvania, United States
- Coordinates: 39.916104°N 75.432710°W
- Opened: August 1974; 52 years ago (as Granite Run Mall); 2018; 8 years ago (as Promenade at Granite Run)
- Closed: July 1, 2015; 11 years ago (original Granite Run Mall)
- Demolished: March 2016 (original Granite Run Mall)
- Previous names: Granite Run Mall (1974–2015)
- Developer: The Rouse Company and Goodman Company
- Manager: BET Investments
- Owner: BET Investments
- Num. of stores: 125 (at peak)
- Num. of anchor tenants: 2 (formerly 3; JCPenney demolished)
- Floor area: 1,037,187 square feet (96,357.8 m^{2})
- Floors: 2
- Public transit: SEPTA Bus: 110, 111, 114, 117
- Building details

General information
- Type: Shopping mall (1974–2015); Mixed-use (2018–present)

Renovating team
- Renovating firm: BET Investments

The Promenade at Granite Run, formerly known as Granite Run Mall, is a mixed-use development in Middletown Township, Delaware County, Pennsylvania, a western suburb of Philadelphia. The mixed-use development consists of residential, retail, and entertainment opened in 2018 to replace what was known as the Granite Run Mall, a double-level shopping mall that existed between 1974 and 2015. Two of the original mall tenants, Boscov's and Sears, remained open during the transition. The JCPenney store was also planned to remain open during redevelopment, but it was demolished after it closed permanently in April 2015.

== History ==
The property originally opened as the Granite Run Mall in August 1974 with Gimbels and Sears as the original anchors. It was developed by the Baltimore, Maryland–based Rouse Company and the Allentown, Pennsylvania–based Goodman Company. In January 1976, JCPenney joined the mall. In 1986, the Gimbels store was converted to Stern's after Allied Stores purchased seven Gimbels locations in the Philadelphia area. In 1989, Stern's closed and was eventually replaced with Boscov's in 1993. In 1998, Simon Property Group and Macerich purchased the mall, with Simon responsible for managing the mall. The Granite Run Mall had a total of 125 stores at its peak.

=== Decline, closure, and redevelopment ===
In the 2000s, the Granite Run Mall saw an increase in vacancies and its owners started exploring options for selling the mall. In February 2011, Simon and Macerich were over 30 days delinquent on the mall's $115 million mortgage, leading to the possibility of a sale or forfeiture of the mall. On April 1, 2011, Simon Property Group gave the mall back to its lender and the lender appointed Madison Marquette as the leasing and management agent. Madison Marquette announced plans to improve lighting, the parking lots, and sidewalks as well as to fill vacancies.

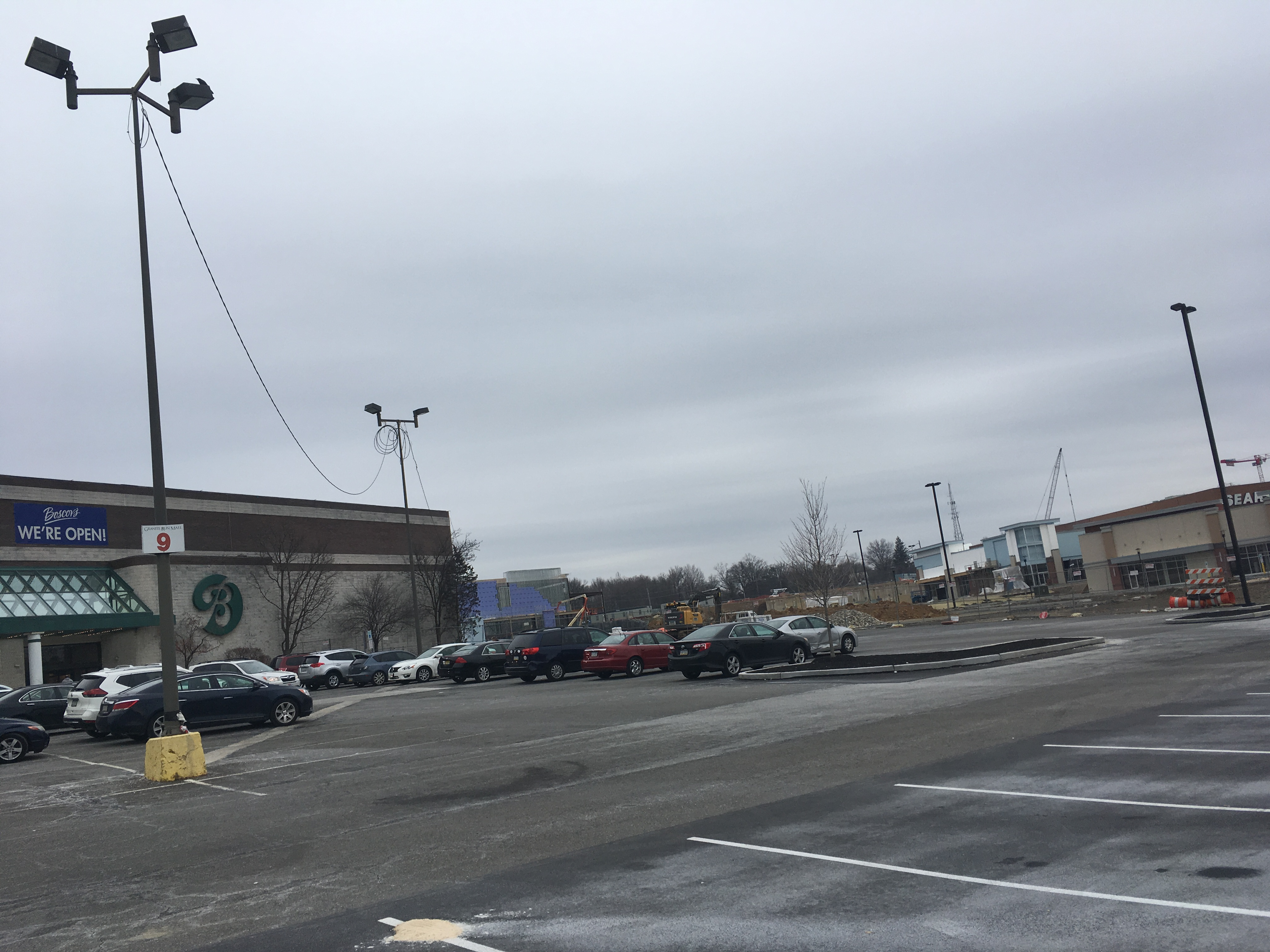
Construction on the Promenade at Granite Run in January 2018

On September 23, 2013, the Granite Run Mall was sold to BET Investments, a real estate development firm owned by Bruce Toll and Michael Markman, at a cost of $24 million. BET Investments intended to convert the mall into a mixed-use development consisting of residential, retail, and entertainment. The initial plans for the redevelopment project would keep the three anchor stores but would demolish the remainder of the mall and replace it with an outdoor shopping and dining area. The plans also included the construction two four-story apartment buildings with a total of 365 units between them. Other features that were planned in the redevelopment included a larger movie theater and standalone restaurants.

On August 25, 2014, updated plans were revealed for the redevelopment. The three department stores would remain, with the upper level of JCPenney becoming a movie theater, while the interior of the mall will be demolished and turned into an outdoor shopping and dining area with upscale establishments. One four-story luxury apartment building with 385 units will also be constructed. Work on the redevelopment is expected to begin in 2015 or 2016 with completion expected two years after the project begins. The plans were modified again on October 27, 2014, in which two luxury apartments with a total of 388 units would be constructed, one on the site of the movie theater and the other on the site of a former Chi-Chi's restaurant. The redevelopment will take place in two phases. The first phase will demolish the mall interior and build one of the apartment buildings. The second phase will demolish the current movie theater and construct the other apartment building. In January 2015, it was announced the JCPenney store was closing in April as part of a plan to close 39 stores nationwide. As a result, the mall announced plans to demolish the former JCPenney and replace it with new retail space and a movie theater.

The interior of the mall closed on July 1, 2015, with Sears and Boscov's remaining open. On November 9, 2015, the final plans for the mixed-use development were approved by the Middletown Township council, in which the development would be called the Promenade at Granite Run. The demolition of the former mall began in 2016. Construction of the Promenade at Granite Run progressed through 2017, with a formal opening in 2018.

On June 16, 2021, it was announced that Sears would be closing on August 15, 2021, which left Boscov's as the only anchor left.

== In popular culture ==
The Granite Run Mall was originally intended to be the filming location for MallBrats, the sequel to director Kevin Smith's 1995 film Mallrats. However, the plan fell through due to the impending demolition of the mall and Smith's desire to start filming in January 2016; MallBrats was instead planned be filmed at the Exton Square Mall before plans were cancelled in February 2017.

The mall inspired comedy band Gnarkill fronted by Brandon DiCamillo to write the song "Granite Run Mall in the 80s!" from their 2006 album Gnarkill vs. Unkle Matt & the Shitbirdz, featuring references to the Aladdin's Castle arcade.
