= Pennsylvania Route 452 =

State highway in Delaware County, Pennsylvania, US

Pennsylvania Route 452

Route information
- Maintained by PennDOT
- Length: 7.097 mi (11.422 km)

Major junctions
- South end: US 13 in Marcus Hook
- I-95 in Upper Chichester Township; US 322 in Upper Chichester Township; US 1 in Middletown Township
- North end: PA 352 in Lima

Location
- Country: United States
- State: Pennsylvania
- Counties: Delaware

Highway system
- Pennsylvania State Route System; Interstate; US; State; Scenic; Legislative
| ← PA 451 | → PA 453 |

Pennsylvania Route 452 (PA 452) is a state highway in Delaware County, Pennsylvania. The route runs from U.S. Route 13 (US 13) in Marcus Hook north to PA 352 in Lima. The route runs through suburban areas, passing through Linwood and Aston Township. PA 452 intersects Interstate 95 (I-95) and US 322 in Upper Chichester Township and US 1 in Lima. PA 452 was first designated by 1928 between its current termini. A portion of the route in Aston Township was realigned by 1950.

== Route description ==
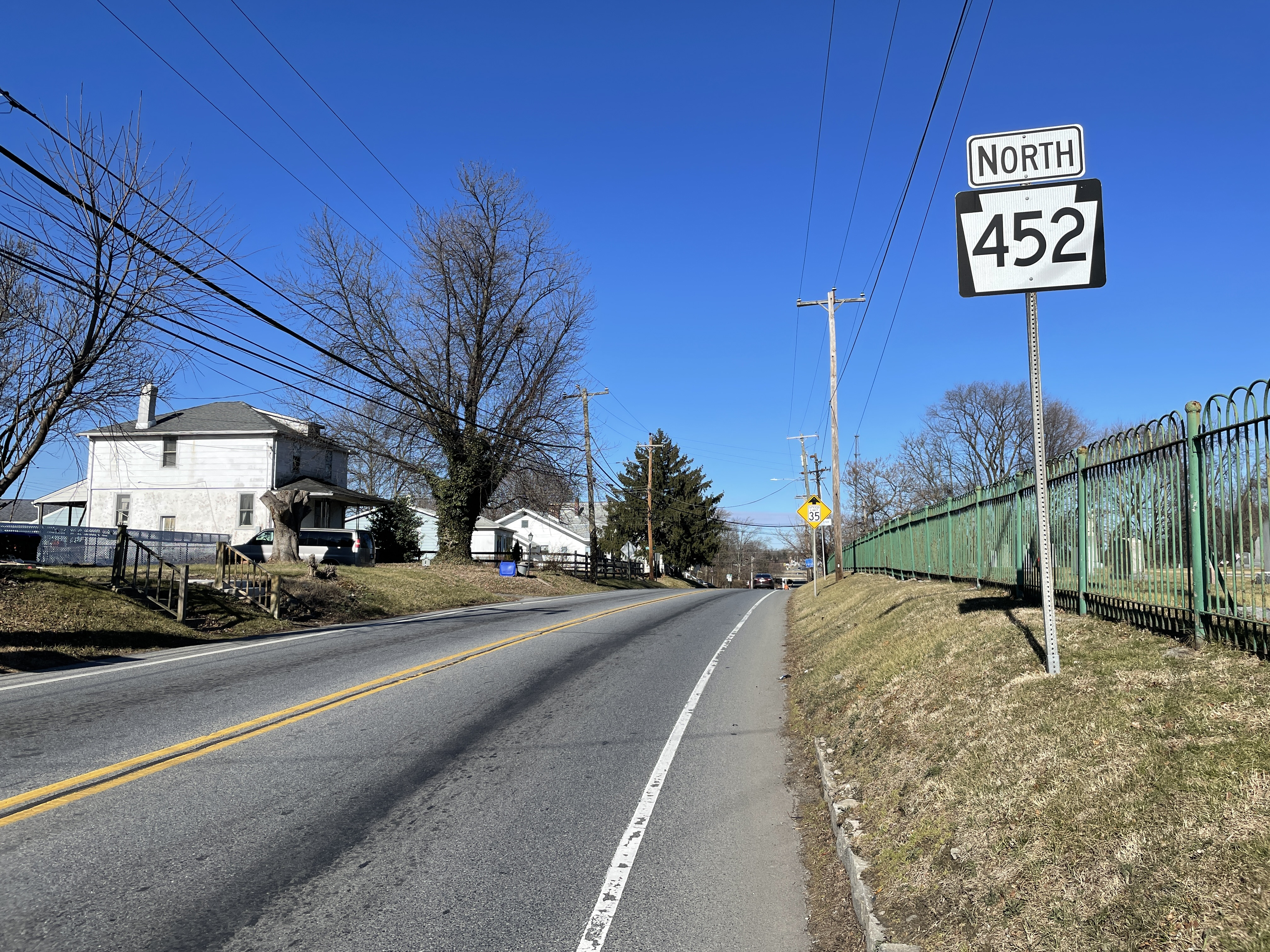
PA 452 northbound in Linwood

PA 452 begins at an intersection with US 13 in the borough of Marcus Hook in Delaware County, heading north-northwest on two-lane undivided Market Street. South of this intersection, Market Street continues as an unnumbered road toward the Delaware River. From US 13, the route passes businesses before coming to a bridge over Amtrak's Northeast Corridor railroad line east of the Marcus Hook station serving SEPTA's Wilmington/Newark Line. Past this bridge, the road enters Lower Chichester Township, passing a mix of homes and businesses and intersecting Ridge Road and Chichester Avenue before continuing into residential areas in the community of Linwood. Upon crossing Laughead Avenue, PA 452 heads into Upper Chichester Township and runs north past more homes to the west, widening into a four-lane divided highway as it crosses Marcus Hook Creek and comes to an interchange with I-95. Past this interchange, the route heads into commercial areas, narrowing back into a two-lane undivided road and coming to a bridge over CSX's Philadelphia Subdivision railroad line. A short distance further north, the road comes to an interchange with US 322.

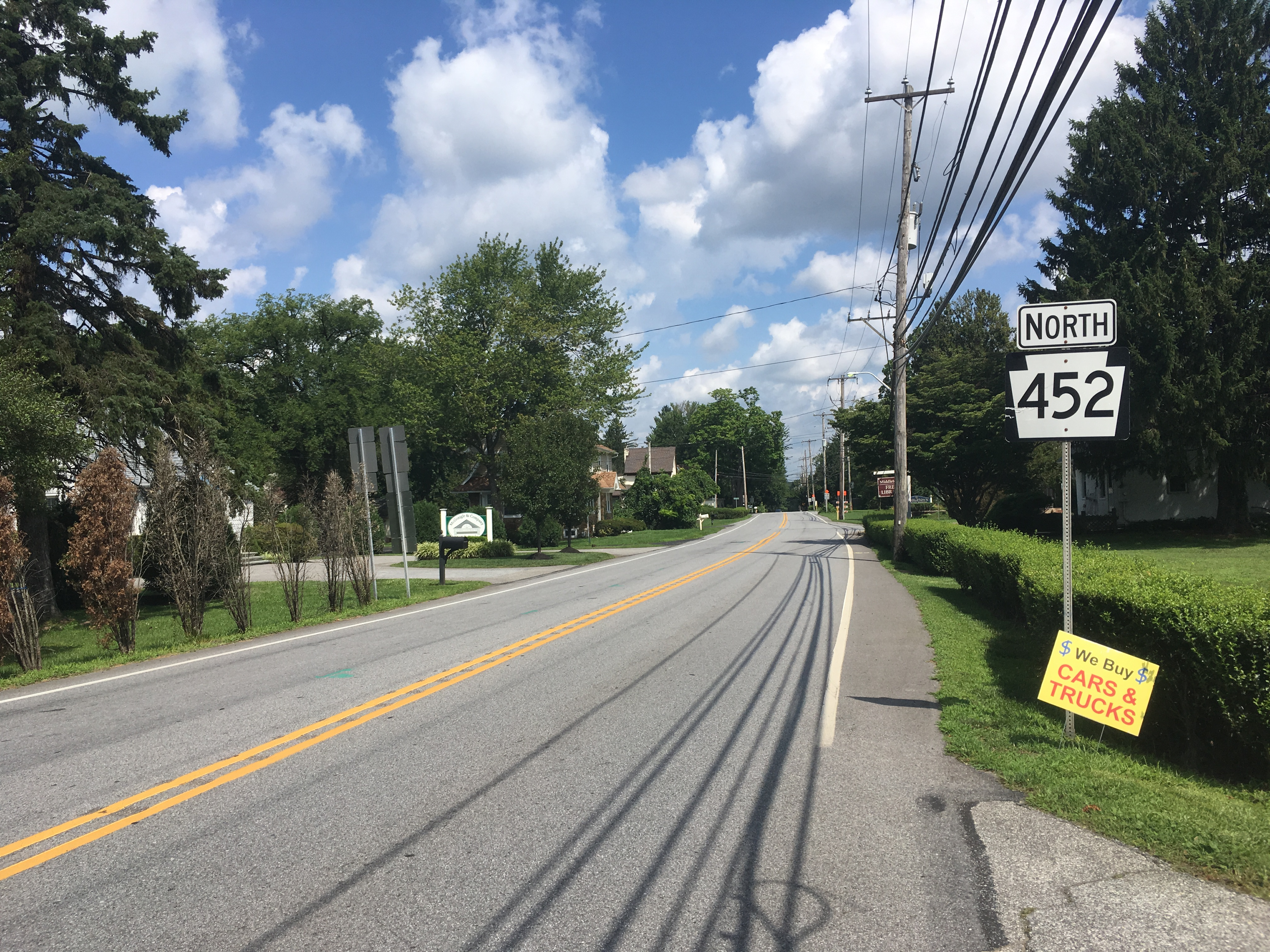
PA 452 northbound past US 1 in Middletown Township

Following this, PA 452 passes a mix of homes and businesses, crossing into Aston Township. Here, the route becomes Pennell Road and passes between a shopping center to the west and an industrial park to the east before continuing past businesses with some nearby residential areas as a three-lane road with a center left-turn lane. The road intersects Concord Road and curves north-northwest near more development, narrowing back to two lanes, and heads north into wooded areas. PA 452 continues to wind north through woodland with some residential and commercial development, running a short distance to the west of Chester Creek. The route passes under the Chester Creek Trail before it turns northwest and crosses the creek into Middletown Township. Here, it runs near some development in the community of Glen Riddle before curving north and coming to a bridge over SEPTA's Media/Wawa Line near the former Glen Riddle station. The road heads north through wooded residential areas, continuing to an intersection with US 1 (Baltimore Pike) in a commercial area. Past this junction, PA 452 heads past homes in the community of Lima, reaching its northern terminus at an intersection with PA 352. Barren Road continues northeast from this intersection as State Route 4004, an unsigned quadrant route.

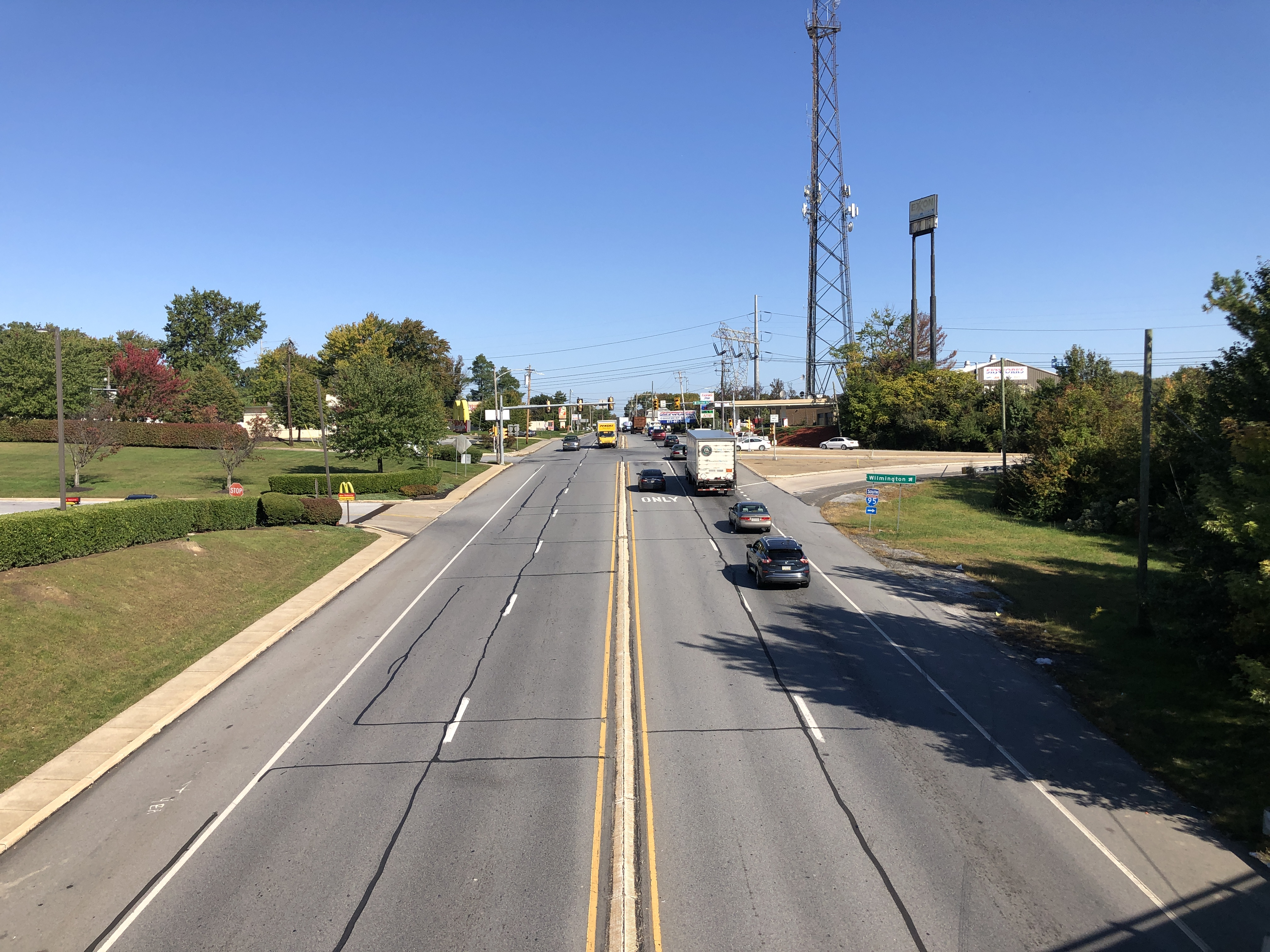
PA 452 northbound in Upper Chichester Township

== History ==
When Pennsylvania first legislated routes in 1911, the current alignment of PA 452 was not legislated as part of a route. PA 452 was first designated by 1928 to run from US 13/PA 91 in Marcus Hook north to PA 352 in Lima. By 1950, a portion of PA 452 was realigned in Aston Township, with the former alignment becoming Old Pennell Road. Also by this time, an interchange was constructed with the new alignment of US 322 in Upper Chichester Township. PA 452 had previously intersected US 322 at an at-grade intersection with Concord Road (which carried US 322) in Aston Township. During the 1960s, an interchange was built with the newly constructed I-95 in Upper Chichester Township.

== Major intersections ==
The entire route is in Delaware County.

| Location | mi | km | Destinations | Notes |
|---|---|---|---|---|
| Marcus Hook | 0.000 | 0.000 | US 13 (10th Street) | Southern terminus |
| Upper Chichester Township | 1.051 | 1.691 | I-95 – Wilmington, Philadelphia | Exit 2 on I-95 |
| Upper Chichester Township | 1.898 | 3.055 | US 322 – Concordville, Chester | Interchange |
| Middletown Township | 6.735 | 10.839 | US 1 (Baltimore Pike) – Concordville, Media | |
| Middletown Township | 7.097 | 11.422 | PA 352 (Middletown Road) – Frazer, Brookhaven | Northern terminus |
1.000 mi = 1.609 km; 1.000 km = 0.621 mi
