= Lenni, Pennsylvania =

Unincorporated community in Pennsylvania, US

- Unincorporated community
- Location within Pennsylvania
- Coordinates: 39°53′38″N 75°26′52″W
- Country: United States
- State: Pennsylvania
- County: Delaware
- Township: Middletown
- Elevation: 151 ft (46 m)
- Time zone: UTC-5 (Eastern (EST))
  - Summer (DST): UTC-4 (EDT)
- ZIP code: 19052
- Area codes: 610 and 484
- GNIS feature ID: 1179198

Lenni is an unincorporated community in Middletown Township, Delaware County, Pennsylvania, United States. Lenni is located at the intersection of Lenni Road and Lungren Road, northeast of the Chester Creek.

== History ==
On January 2, 1797, Thomas Griffith sold a tract of land to John Lungren, a paper manufacturer from Upper Providence, for the purposes of developing a mill which was built in 1798.

After 1877, the mills were leased to Union Army General Robert Patterson.

The Lenni train station was closed in September 1986, due to deteriorating track conditions and Chester County's desire to expand facilities at Exton Station on SEPTA's Paoli/Thorndale Line.
