= Bortondale, Pennsylvania =

Unincorporated community in Pennsylvania, US

- Unincorporated community
- Location within Pennsylvania
- Coordinates: 39°54′6″N 75°24′22″W
- Country: United States
- State: Pennsylvania
- County: Delaware
- Township: Middletown
- Elevation: 289 ft (88 m)
- Time zone: UTC-5 (Eastern (EST))
  - Summer (DST): UTC-4 (EDT)
- Area codes: 610 and 484
- GNIS feature ID: 1170013

Bortondale is an unincorporated community in Middletown Township in Delaware County, Pennsylvania, United States. Bortondale is located along Bortondale Road west of Ridley Creek.
