= Lenni station =

Railway station in Middletown Township, Pennsylvania

Lenni
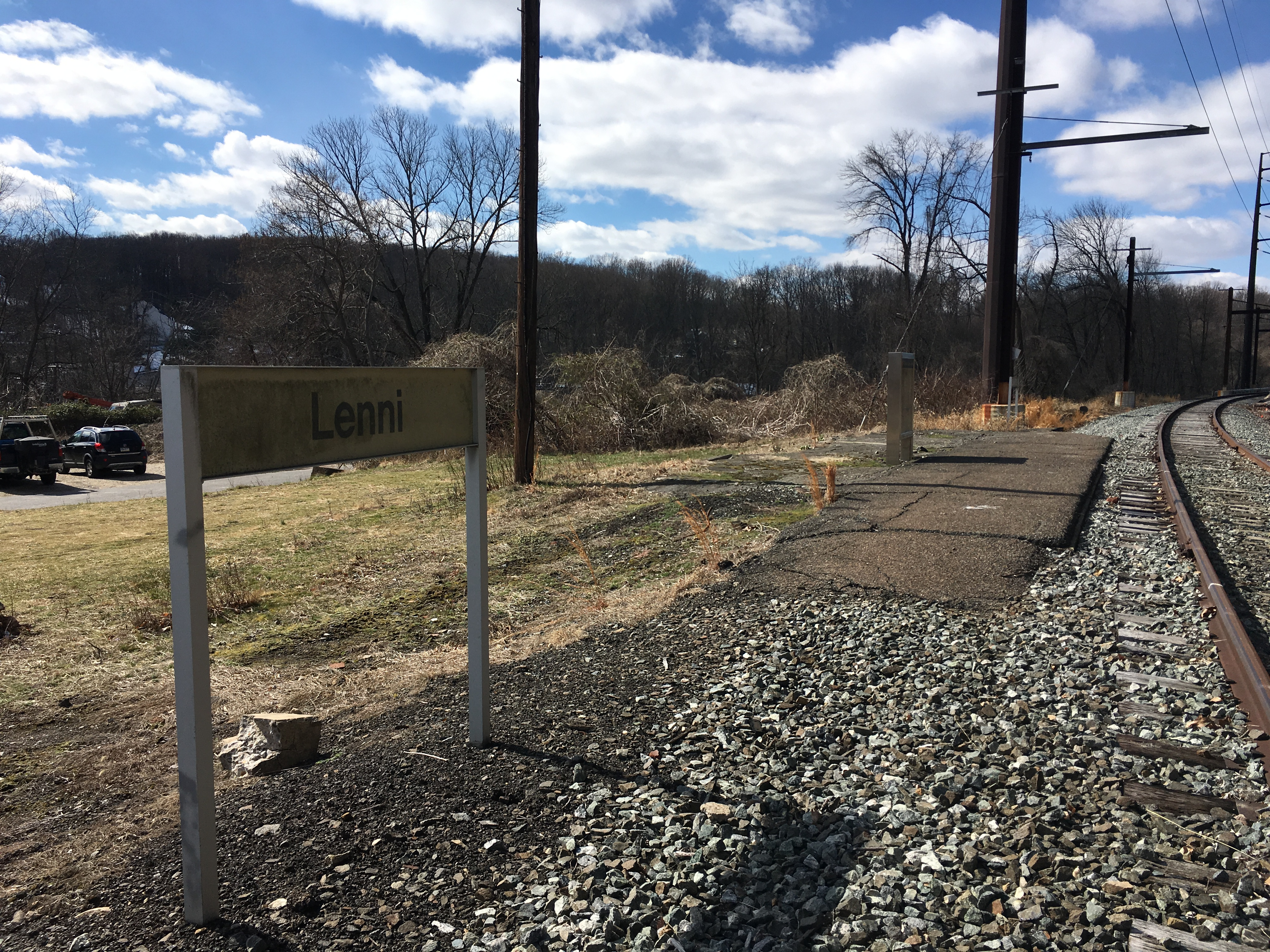
- The former Lenni station site in March 2017

General information
- Location: Station Lane and Lenni Road; Middletown Township, Pennsylvania
- Coordinates: 39.8942°N 75.4486°W
- Owner: SEPTA
- Line: West Chester Line
- Platforms: 1 side platform (former)
- Tracks: 1

History
- Opened: September 22, 1856
- Closed: September 19, 1986

Former services
| Preceding station | SEPTA | Following station |
|---|---|---|
| Wawa Station toward West Chester | West Chester Line | Glen Riddle toward Suburban Station |
| Preceding station | Pennsylvania Railroad | Following station |
| Wawa toward West Chester | West Chester Line | Glen Riddle toward Suburban Station |
| Terminus | Chester Creek Branch | Rockdale toward Lamokin Street |
Location

Lenni station was a commuter rail station on the SEPTA Regional Rail R3 West Chester Line, located in Middletown Township, Delaware County, Pennsylvania. The station and several others were closed in September 1986, and subsequently demolished. The site now serves as the location of a crew base building that was constructed in connection with the 2022 restoration of service to Wawa Station.

== History ==
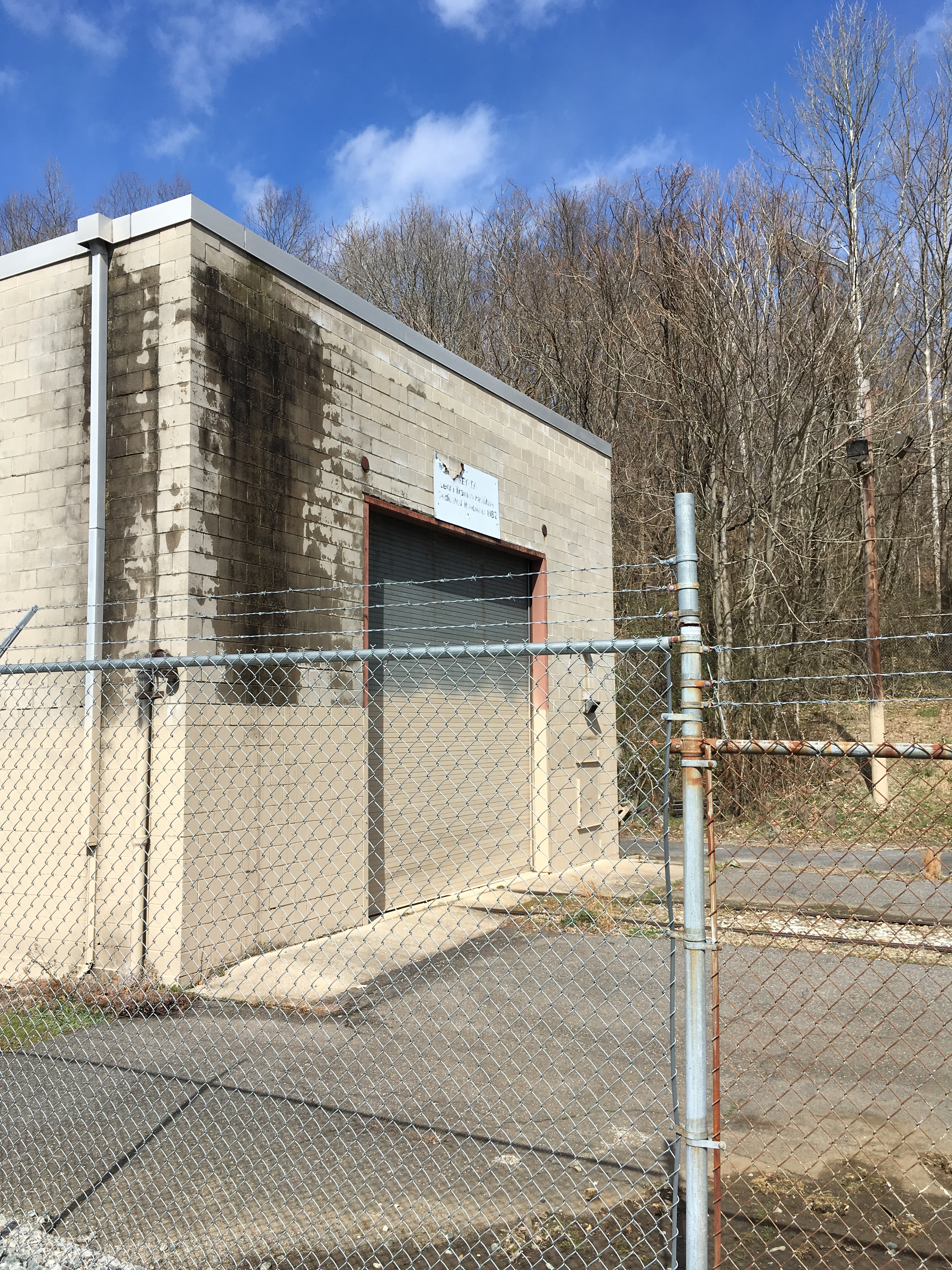
SEPTA training facility at Lenni in 2017

Built by the Pennsylvania Railroad, Lenni station stood on the corner of Station Lane and Lenni Road. It served as a stop on the West Chester Branch, which was electrified on December 2, 1928. It later became a part of SEPTA's R3 West Chester line. The Middletown Board of Supervisors gave the Lenni Heights Fire Company permission to destroy the abandoned 2.5 story station depot at the request of Pennsylvania Railroad officials on February 8, 1960. By this point, the depot had been vacant and Lenni station had been reduced to a partial schedule of regular and flag stops. The fire company noted that as soon as the railroad gave its blessing, they would burn the depot down.

The PRR's former Chester Creek Branch terminated at Lenni. The line sustained heavy flash flood damage in September 1971 (not due to the later Hurricane Agnes as is sometimes claimed), and was taken out of service at that time. The railway was never officially abandoned and has since been deeded to SEPTA via PennDOT.

The station, and all of those west of Elwyn station, was closed in September 1986, due to deteriorating track conditions and Chester County's desire to expand facilities at Exton station on SEPTA's Paoli/Thorndale Line. Service was suspended at that time, with substitute bus service provided. Lenni station still appears in publicly posted tariffs. The station shed itself was demolished in the 1990s; the asphalt platform and signage remained extant until around 2019.

Since passenger service ended in 1986, vandals began stealing the copper catenary wire. A live SEPTA substation exists nearby with transmission lines connecting to Amtrak's Lamokin converter station. The line remained electrified as far west as the former Darlington station. The wire was removed for the remainder of the line out to West Chester over the summer of 2005 to prevent further theft.

The resumption of SEPTA service to Wawa Station, which opened in August 2022, did not include an intermediate stop at Lenni. However, a layover yard was constructed just to the west of the former station site, with a crew base building at Lenni Road.
