= Media station (SEPTA) =

Rail station in Media, Pennsylvania, US

Media
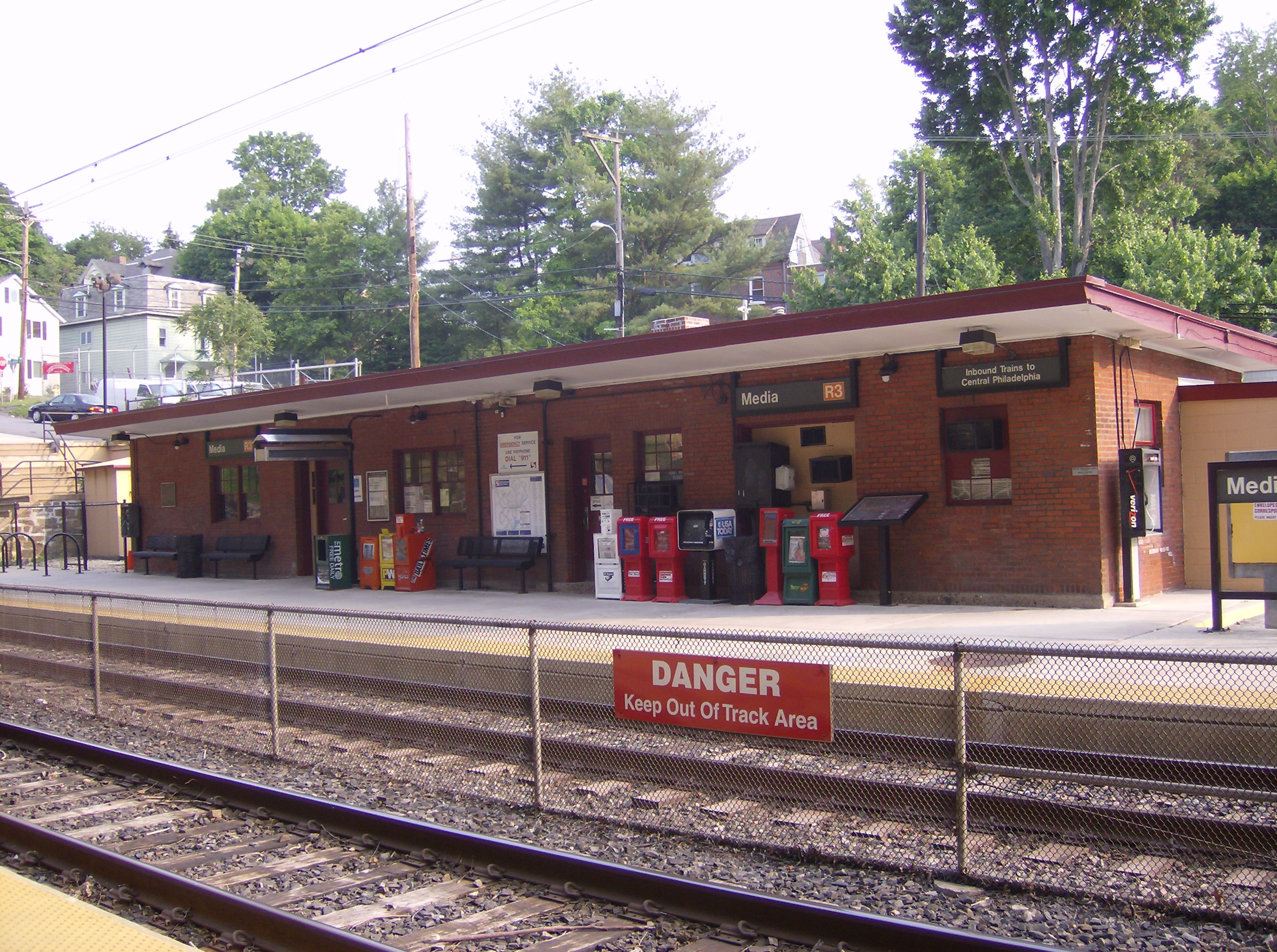

General information
- Location: 309 Media Station Road; Media, Pennsylvania
- Coordinates: 39.9139°N 75.3945°W
- Owner: SEPTA
- Platforms: 2 side platforms
- Tracks: 2

Construction
- Parking: 234 spaces
- Accessible: Yes

Other information
- Fare zone: 3

History
- Opened: October 19, 1854
- Electrified: December 2, 1928

Passengers
- 2017: 512 boardings 492 alightings (weekday average)
- Rank: 48 of 146

Services
Preceding station	SEPTA	Following station
Elwyn toward Wawa Station	Media/Wawa Line	Moylan–Rose Valley toward Temple University
Former services
Preceding station	Pennsylvania Railroad	Following station
Elwyn toward West Chester	West Chester Line	Moylan–Rose Valley toward Suburban Station
Location

Media is an active commuter railroad station in Upper Providence Township, Delaware County, Pennsylvania near the borough of Media. Located on the namesake Media Station Road just off South Orange Street, the station serves trains of SEPTA Regional Rail's Media/Wawa Line, which operates from Temple University station in Philadelphia to Wawa Station in Middletown Township. The station is seven blocks south of the Orange Street/Media station, which serves as the western terminus of the SEPTA Metro D1 light rail train from 69th Street Transit Center (former Red Arrow Lines Route 101). No transit connections are provided between the two stations. Media has a large yard to the west of the station for Media/Wawa Line trains. Media station consists of two low-level side platforms surrounding two tracks, which are separated by an in-track fence. The former Pennsylvania Railroad station depot stands on the eastbound platform. There is a 234-space parking lot available for commuters to use.

Railroad service in the area began with the extension of the West Chester and Philadelphia Railroad on October 19, 1854. At that time, the railroad station was located at South Olive Street. In 1951, the railroad announced that they would modernize the station depot as part of a $22,000 project. As part of the project, the second floor of the station depot would be removed and the ticket office would be eliminated at its location and moved to the west end of the waiting room. Due to high automobile parking at Media station in the 1970s, SEPTA and Penn Central Railroad made upgrades to Elwyn station in Middletown, which would include the construction of a new parking lot in 1974, opening more spaces for commuters. SEPTA debuted their Silverliner IV cars on their inaugaral run at Media station on May 7, 1974. The rebuilt Elwyn station opened on June 1, 1975 with 200 new parking spaces.

== Station layout ==
Media has two low-level side platforms with a connecting pathway across the tracks.
