= Glen Riddle, Pennsylvania =

Unincorporated community in Pennsylvania, US

- Unincorporated community
- Location within Pennsylvania
- Coordinates: 39°53′38″N 75°26′2″W
- Country: United States
- State: Pennsylvania
- County: Delaware
- Township: Middletown
- Elevation: 82 ft (25 m)
- Time zone: UTC-5 (Eastern (EST))
  - Summer (DST): UTC-4 (EDT)
- ZIP codes: 19037, 19063
- Area codes: 610 and 484
- GNIS feature ID: 1203683

Glen Riddle is an unincorporated community in Middletown Township in Delaware County, Pennsylvania, United States. Glen Riddle is located at the intersection of Pennsylvania Route 452 and Parkmount Road/Glen Riddle Road north of the Chester Creek.

== Transportation ==
SEPTA had provided service to Glen Riddle at South Pennell Road (PA-452). The train station was closed in 1986 with closure of the West Chester Line beyond the Elwyn station. However, SEPTA has been performing ongoing work to restore this area of the track in order to provide service to Wawa.

== Notable people ==
- I. King Jordan, first deaf president of Gallaudet University
- Samuel Riddle, textile manufacturer and father of Samuel D. Riddle
- Samuel Doyle Riddle, racehorse owner
