= Samuel Riddle (textile manufacturer) =

Textile manufacturer (1799–1888)

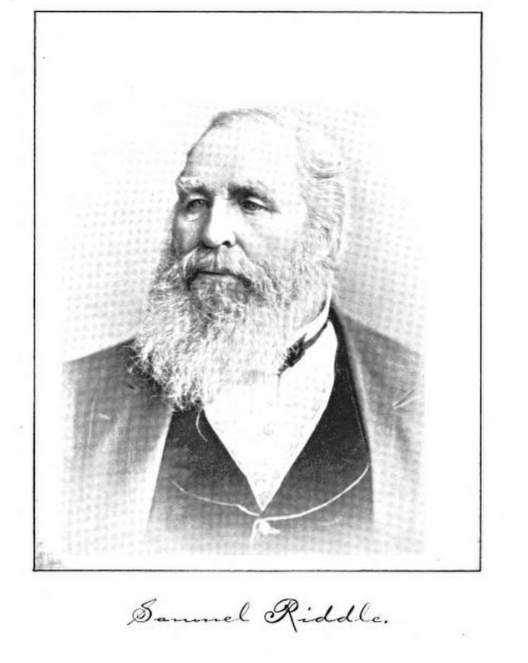
- Born: October 5, 1799; Belfast, Ireland
- Died: February 19, 1888 (aged 88)
- Resting place: Middletown Presbyterian Church Cemetery, Elwyn, Pennsylvania, U.S.
- Occupation: Textile manufacturer

Samuel Riddle (October 5, 1799 – February 19, 1888) was a textile manufacturer from Belfast, Ireland who emigrated to the United States and owned several textile mills in Delaware County, Pennsylvania, United States.

== Early life ==
Riddle was born near Belfast, Ireland. He received a private school education but quit when he was 14 years old to work in a textile mill. In 1823, Riddle sailed to Philadelphia, United States and began working at a cotton-mill in the Manayunk section of town.

== Career ==
In 1827, Riddle went into business for himself by renting a mill in Springdale, Pennsylvania with 480 mule spindles and 10 employees. In 1830, Samuel Riddle along with his brother James moved operations to the Parkmount Mill on Chester Creek in Aston, Pennsylvania. The Riddle brothers operated the Parkmount Mill until 1841 when it was leased to other manufacturers. Riddle eventually owned 5 mills and employed 400 people. The mills had approximately 10,400 cotton and woolen spindles as well as 270 power looms.

== Glen Riddle ==
In the 1840s, Riddle began building an estate of several hundred acres which he named Glen Riddle. This area became the unincorporated community of Glen Riddle in Middletown Township.

== Personal life ==
Riddle lost his first wife Martha after her death during childbirth of his first child, Henry, in 1850. He remarried 23 year old Linda Doyle and together they had four children. Their son, Samuel Doyle Riddle was an American businessman and racehorse owner. Riddle died on February 19, 1888 and is interred at Middletown Presbyterian Church Cemetery in Elwyn, Pennsylvania.
