= Elwyn station =

SEPTA Regional Rail station in Media, Pennsylvania

Elwyn
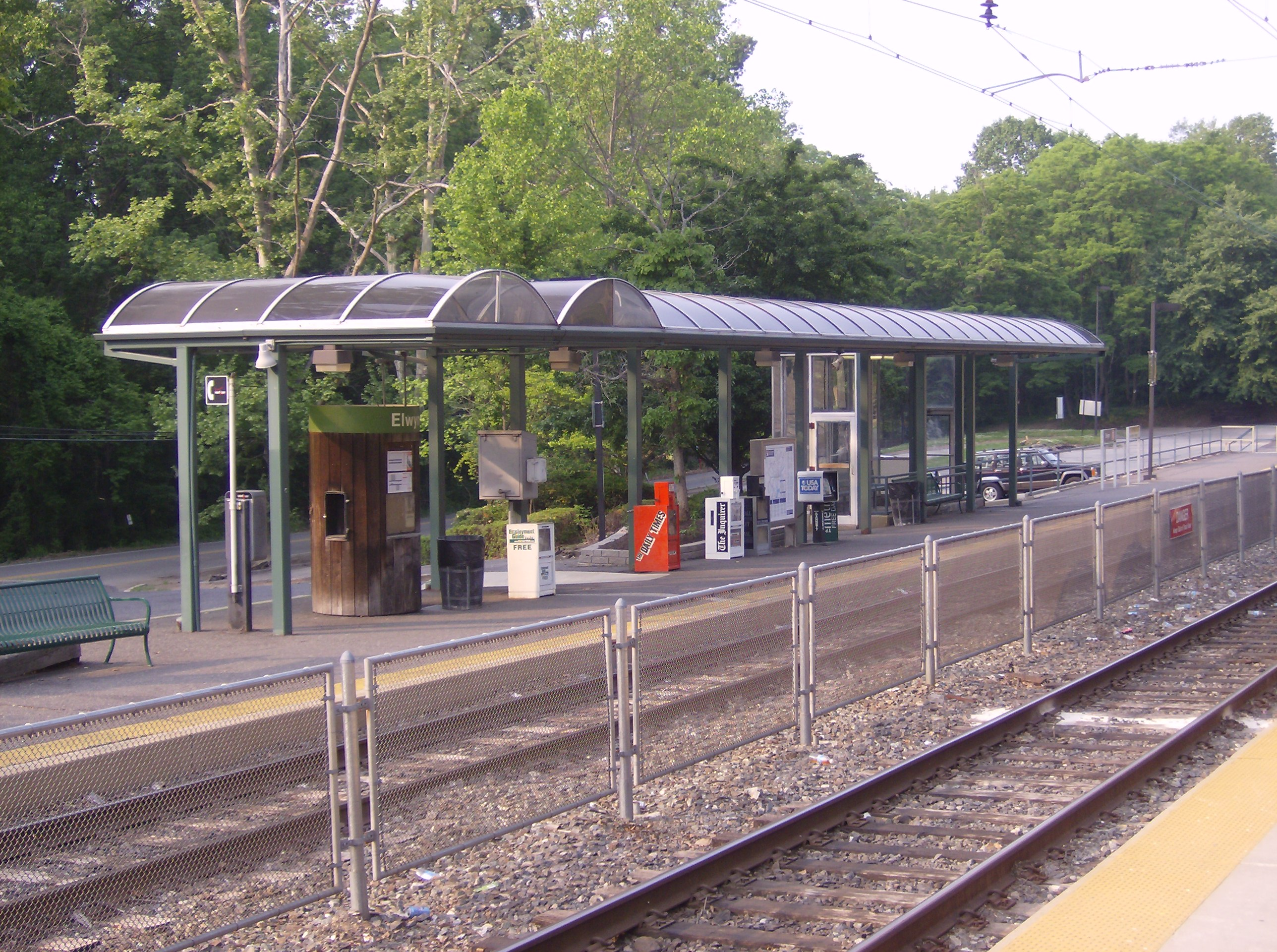
- Platforms at Elwyn station

General information
- Location: 35 Elwyn Avenue; Media, Pennsylvania
- Coordinates: 39.90780°N 75.41124°W
- Owner: SEPTA
- Platforms: 2 side platforms
- Tracks: 2
- Connections: SEPTA Suburban Bus: 117

Construction
- Parking: 317 spaces
- Accessible: Yes

Other information
- Fare zone: 3

History
- Rebuilt: June 2, 1975 (SEPTA); 1990
- Electrified: December 2, 1928
- Former names: Greenwood

Passengers
- 2017: 425 boardings 369 alightings (weekday average)
- Rank: 61 of 146

Services
Preceding station	SEPTA	Following station
Wawa Station Terminus	Media/Wawa Line	Media toward Temple University
Former services
Preceding station	SEPTA	Following station
Williamson School toward West Chester	West Chester Line	Media toward Suburban Station
Preceding station	Pennsylvania Railroad	Following station
Williamson School toward West Chester	West Chester Line	Media toward Suburban Station
Location

Elwyn is an active commuter railroad station in Middletown Township, Delaware County, Pennsylvania. Located on Elwyn Road and Elwyn Avenue east of South New Middletown Road (State Route 352), the station serves trains of SEPTA Regional Rail's Media/Wawa Line from Temple University station in Philadelphia to Wawa Station in Middletown Township. Elwyn station consists of two low-level side platforms surrounding two tracks, which are separated by an in-track fence. There are two miniature high-level ramps to serve passengers with disabilities. Elwyn station also has a 317-space parking lot for commuters.

Railroad service in the area began with the opening of an extension of the West Chester and Philadelphia Railroad from Media to Rockdale (modern-day Glen Riddle) on February 1, 1856. Known as Greenwood originally, Elwyn station was the home of multiple picnic grounds. People from Philadelphia and other suburbs would commute by train to the station to take advantage of the woods and picnic areas. Elwyn station was also home for the Pennsylvania Training School for Feebleminded Children (modern-day Elwyn Inc.). With Media station overloaded in automobiles, SEPTA and Penn Central Railroad agreed in 1974 to make upgrades to Elwyn station in order to open more parking. The upgraded Elwyn station opened on June 2, 1975 with 200 new parking spaces and 43 trains stopping at the station each day.

With the abandonment of service to West Chester on September 18, 1986, Elwyn became the new western terminus of the R3 regional rail line. This remained the case until an extension to Wawa station opened on August 21, 2022.

== History ==
By October 1967, the supply of parking at Media station and nearby Wallingford had grown inadequate for the demand. Locals noted an uptick in traffic at both stops during the morning and evening commutes, including people from western Delaware County and Chester County who would go from station to station along the line until they could find available parking. There were also complaints that the increased traffic would result in more problems with pedestrian and children crossing local streets. With the newly-created Southeastern Pennsylvania Transportation Authority (SEPTA) subsidizing Pennsylvania Railroad commuter services, officials from both counties pushed for the construction of a new park and ride terminal at the under-served Elwyn station. This would involve the construction of a parking lot with several thousand spaces to attract the overflow riders looking for a place to park. SEPTA agreed that the idea was a strong one, but stated that they would have to negotiate with the Elwyn Institute and the Pennsylvania Railroad in order to push progress on a new station. The Elwyn Institute would need to provide more parking and the railroad would have to provide an extension of active services west from Media to Elwyn. Guy DeFuria, a Delaware County official, stated that Elwyn Institute had given verbal assurance that a new lease could be negotiated to improve facilities at Elwyn station.

SEPTA agreed to review a study done for the project in November 1967. The study, provided by SEPTA staff, stated that 100 commuters using the Media station parking lot or parking in the area of Media station and walking to the train would be divertible to a rebuilt station in Elwyn. SEPTA officials stated that there was enough land available in a new lease to build an 800-space parking lot. The agency stated that the proposed 500 parking spaces may not be necessary in the short term for a new station at Elwyn, but added that they wanted to improve facilities there to reduce the strain at Media. The construction would involve building a new side track at Elwyn to facilitate 10-car trains or adding a new track period between Media and Elwyn. SEPTA officials stated it would be cheaper to build the siding approach at Elwyn than double-tracking the stretch. Pennsylvania Railroad officials supported the project on the condition they would not have to finance any part of the project.

SEPTA's Michael J. Reichel announced on December 12, 1967 that the project would cost between $210,000 and $560,000 depending on which approach was taken and agreements made with the Elwyn Institute. The $210,000 project would involve the construction of a 200-car parking lot and a siding to facilitate trains. The $560,000 plan would involve building the 500-car parking lot and double-tracking the line between Media and Elwyn. Neither proposal included the cost of a renewed lease with the Elwyn Institute. Reichel added that both parking lots could be expanded to 800 spaces in the future and either proposal would involved fare parking. Reichel noted that Media station only had 142 parking spaces and every single one was in use, resulting in drives to Swarthmore station before they could find a place to park. Any funding for this project would have to go through the proposed Pennsylvania State Transportation Authority before it could be used on a new project. They would also look at having to go through the State Deparment of Community Affairs or asking the federal government for money to fund the construction. Reichel stated that due to the high uncertainly, any proposed date for opening of the new Elwyn station could not be estimated. Reichel added that SEPTA had no extra cars for improved service to the area.

Gilliat Schroeder, the chairman of the Elwyn Institute, stated that SEPTA had conversations about a new lease, but no deals had been arranged up to that point. With the station 600 feet (180 m) from the institute, there was local excitement for the agency as it would reduce the isolation to the community. Schroeder noted that the new station would also open them to having more students come by train, on top of the 1,250 that lived there or came via school bus from 26 local school districts.

By October 1968, the project had shrunk significantly. After having gotten approval from the Delaware Valley Regional Planning Commission, SEPTA only had $73,000 outlined for the construction of a 200-space parking lot at Elwyn, a reduction of almost two-thirds from the cheaper $210,000 proposal. Shrinking the project caused angst among the community. With the reduction of spaces from 500 to 200 and the project moving at a snail's pace, the $73,000 project would end up requiring more approvals than originally planned and have to wait until the political situation in Washington D.C. changed on January 20, 1969. SEPTA officials stated that the Elwyn upgrades were now less important compared to needed upgrades in Center City, Philadelphia, along with an extension to Warminster from Hatboro and 48 new cars for rail operations. They noted that there was no land available in Media to purchase for the expansion of land, meaning that in order to build more spaces, a garage would be necessary. This would also mean that congestion in Media would not come down. They were also skeptical that residents of Delaware County would be willing to go to Elwyn instead of Media and that the 200 spaces would be considered a good test subject of future ridership. Ed Harvey of SEPTA noted that the other problem with the project was the lack of a modern signal system west of Media to West Chester and as a result, only one train can run on the line at a time. Harvey said SEPTA would be unlikely to speed up the process either unless the federal government gives them room to apply for more funding.

Plans for improving Elwyn station resurfaced in 1972. In March, SEPTA filed applications for $24 million in federal money o improve 35 stations, build more parking and expand rail car facilities. With money from the Urban Mass Transit Authority, the state of Pennsylvania would contribute $6 million and the counties that were part of SEPTA would also contribute $6 million. Funding for Elwyn would let Penn Central Railroad increase the small parking lot to 250 spaces at the cost of $400,000. A new station building to sell tickets would also be installed. The Philadelphia to Media corridor was one of eleven regions designated nationwide as part of the Urban Corridor Program in July 1972. With this, the federal government would offer money for the construction of the upgraded Elwyn station, costing about $500,000. With the money given, the line would also have a crossover built at Secane station to turn trains around to Philadelphia and operate more service. Secane station was considered one of the heaviest used stations on the line to West Chester. For Elwyn, there were eight cars parked at the small station and Media continued to be overloaded. Early projection was that the rebuilt station would be open by 1974. SEPTA approved the projects at Elwyn and Secane on the afternoon of August 16, 1972.

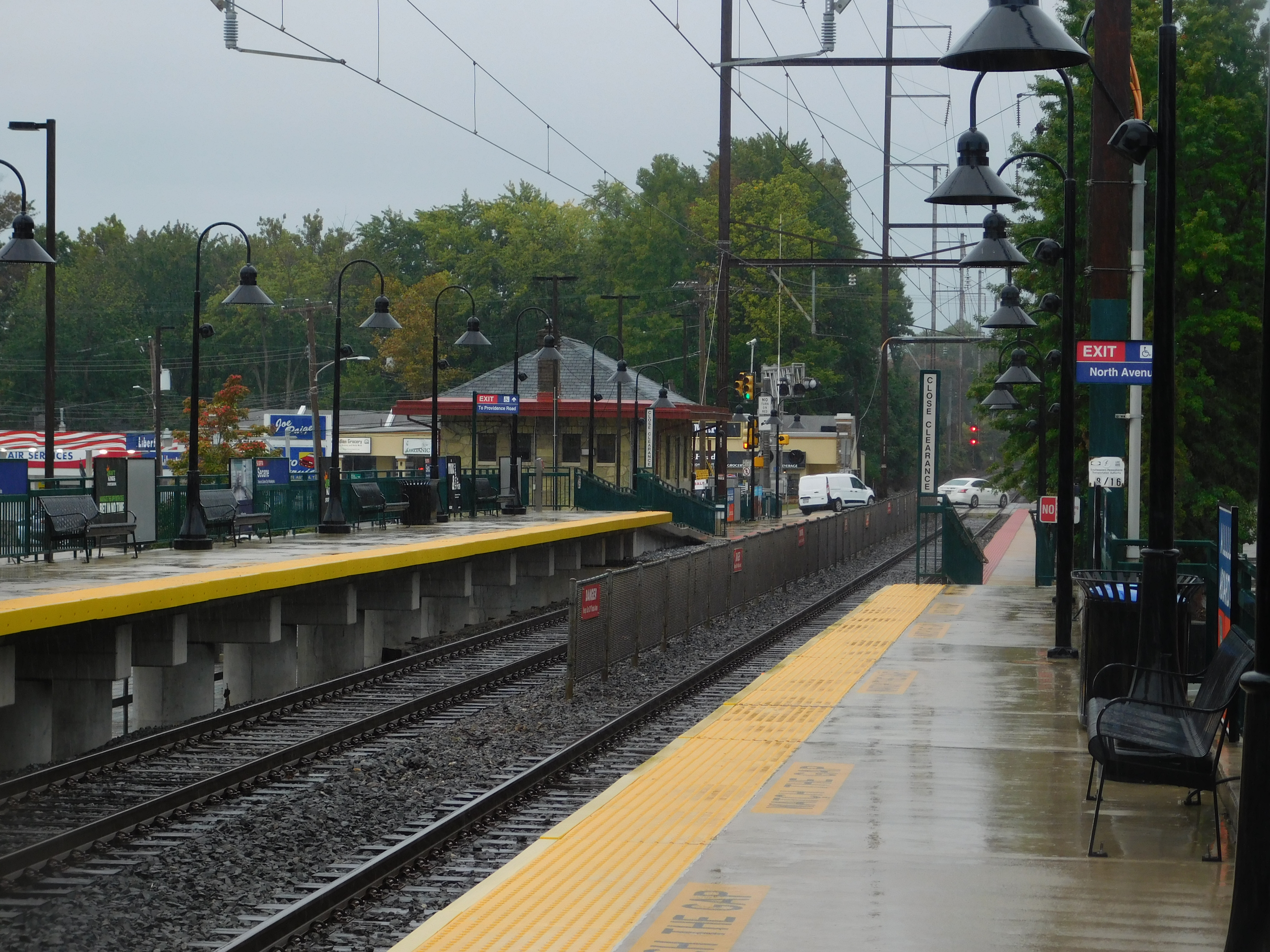
Secane station, source of the new turnaround tracks

A federal grant totaling $984,642 for the pair of projects was approved on February 22, 1973. The new station at Elwyn would now have a 225-space parking lot and construction would begin around July 1973.

With funding secured, SEPTA requested the Middletown Township Board of Supervisors ask the Pennsylvania Department of Transportation (PennDOT) to conduct a traffic survey at the intersections of Elwyn Road with Baltimore Pike and Middletown Road (State Route 352) in January 1974. The supervisors stated that they would ask PennDOT to conduct the survey but did not state that it would support installation traffic lights at that time period. SEPTA at that time was also negotiating with the Elwyn Institute for the purchase of land for the new station. Elwyn requested the new traffic study as part of negotiations and SEPTA agreed to their request. SEPTA officially awarded contracts on the new station at Elwyn in late June 1974. Erb Engineering and Construction of King of Prussia got $330,500 for the work, which involved building the new parking lot, new platforms and heated shelters at Elwyn station. The new parking lot would serve 200 cars and have modern lighting. C. J. Spizzirri of Philadelphia got a $30,000 secondary contract for electrical work at the station. The expectation was that the new station would be complete by July 1975.

The parking lot at Elwyn station opened on the morning of December 9, 1974. An opening ceremony was held with Francis Desmond and Weldon Heyburn, the representatives of SEPTA for Delaware County, present, along with County Commissioners Harry McNichol and Nicholas Catania. Middletown Township's manager, Donald Glackin, was also present at the ceremony. The new station at Elwyn had 200 new parking spaces and an internal loop for kiss and ride purposes. The parking for the new station was free, compared to the original proposal for a 25¢ fare in 1967. Service at Elwyn station was improved from 11 trains to 27 trains stopping on weekdays. Service on Saturdays would go from three trains to 15. However, with the new station opening, only a quarter of the new lot was used during the day. SEPTA officials stated that people were unaware the new station was open and that numbers would improve. Others stated that not enough of the new trains stop at times where Elwyn station would prove convenient over Media.

By January 1975, the parking situation had not improved, with the station only averaging about 25 cars per day, an eighth of the installed capacity. The problems with the schedule had not been abated. Elwyn's train times in the morning were only on hourly service, compared to Media, in which five trains left in the same time period. The expectation was that proper rush hour service would be in place by the summer of 1975.

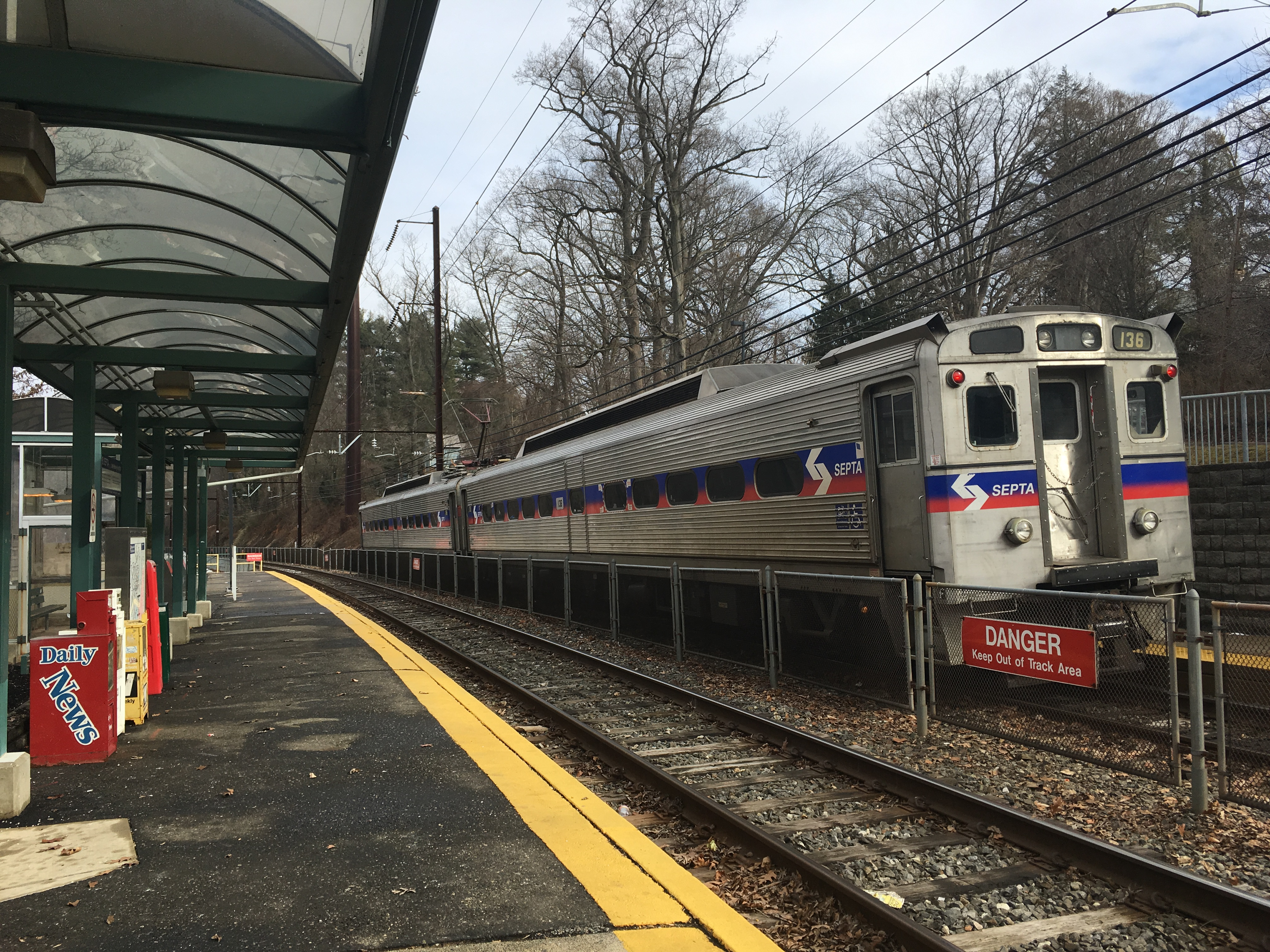
Elwyn station in January 2018

On May 29, 1975, SEPTA announced that the expansion of service at Elwyn would begin on June 2. The weekday train offerings would go from 26 trains to 43, 10 of which would be inbound trains from Penn Center Station in Philadelphia, and seven would be inbound from West Chester. Most of these trains would plug the holes in the rush hour schedule that was keeping ridership at Elwyn station down after the opening of the parking lot in December 1974. SEPTA announced that opening ceremonies would be held for the upgraded services at Elwyn station, with local, state and county officials present, along with local civic and fraternal groups. The Penncrest High School marching band would also perform during the ceremonies. They also noted that the planned construction of a new shelter at Elwyn station would come in the fall of 1975. At the opening of service on June 2, Richard Pinkham of SEPTA presented Joseph F. Lancellot of Middletown Township with a ceremonial large version of the new schedule at Elwyn station. Despite the pomp and circumstance tied to the opening, the crowd at the Elwyn station ceremony was a small one.

With ridership at Elwyn station still slow out of the gate, SEPTA offered a "parking lot roulette" contest to promote new riders. This wheel would correspond to a parking space number and whoever is parked in the space would get free rides depending on the place they finished. First place would get 40 rides; second place would get 30 rides; third place would get 20 rides; and first place would get 10 rides. Fred Clothier of General Steuben Drive in Middletown Township won the first place prize of 40 free rides. He stated that he had moved to Middletown Township in May and had been using Media station to commute until the opening of upgraded service at Elwyn station, noting that Media station had been too crowded.

== Station layout ==
Elwyn has two low-level side platforms with a connecting pathway across the tracks.
