= Middletown Township, Delaware County, Pennsylvania =

Township in Pennsylvania, US

- Home rule municipality
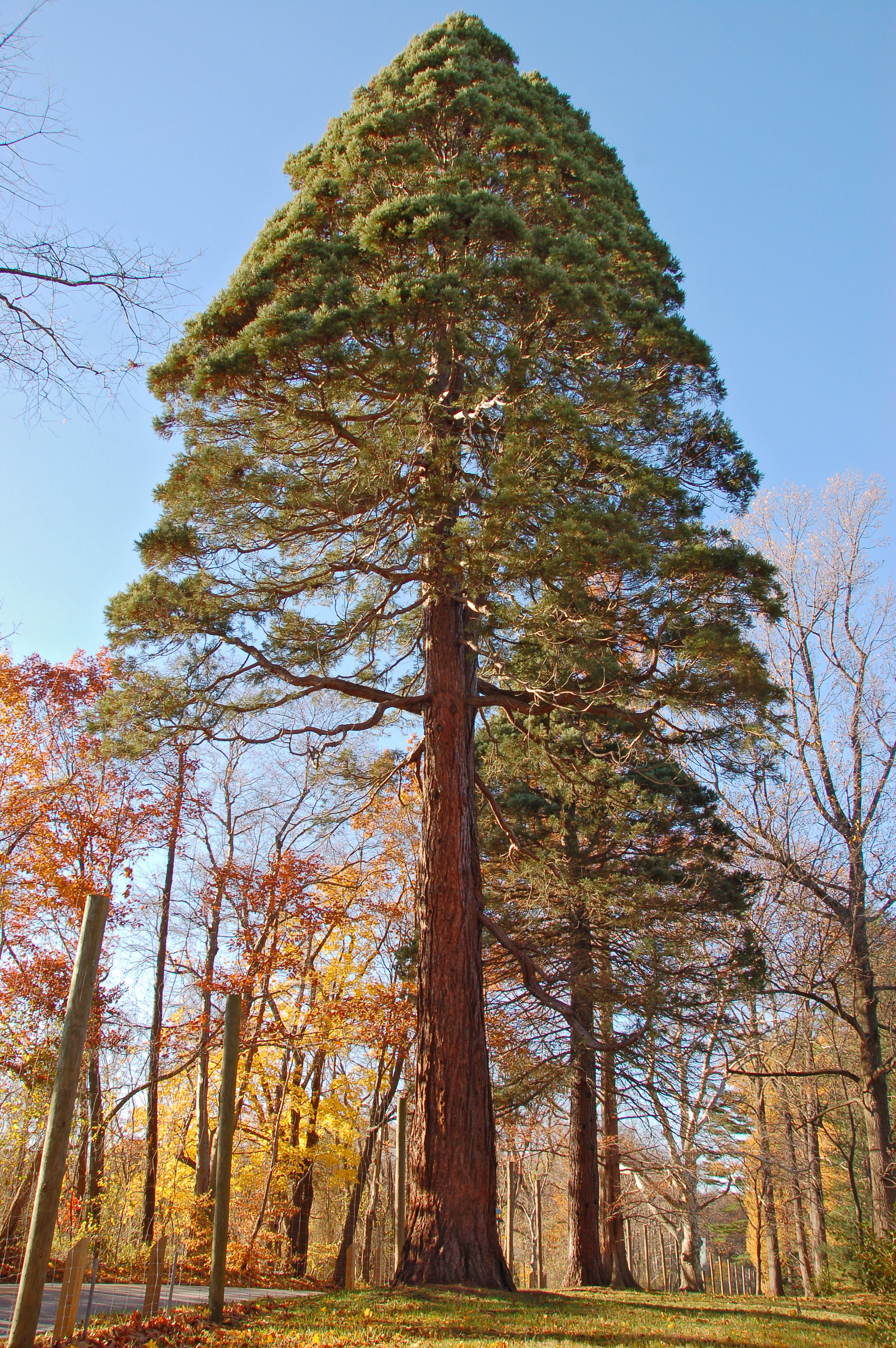
- Giant Sequoia at John J. Tyler Arboretum

- Logo
- Motto: "Where all trails lead"
- Location in Delaware County and the state of Pennsylvania.

- Location of Pennsylvania in the United States
- Coordinates: 39°54′11″N 75°25′41″W
- Country: United States
- State: Pennsylvania
- County: Delaware
- Founded: 1686

Area
  - Total: 13.47 sq mi (34.88 km^{2})
  - Land: 13.47 sq mi (34.88 km^{2})
  - Water: 0 sq mi (0.00 km^{2})
- Elevation: 161 ft (49 m)

Population (2010)
  - Total: 15,807
  - Estimate (2016): 15,984
  - Density: 1,186.8/sq mi (458.21/km^{2})
- Time zone: UTC-5 (EST)
  - Summer (DST): UTC-4 (EDT)
- Area code: 610
- FIPS code: 42-045-49136
- Website: middletowndelcopa.gov

Middletown Township is a township in Delaware County, Pennsylvania, United States. The population was 15,807 at the 2010 census. The Pennsylvania State University has an undergraduate satellite campus called Penn State Brandywine located in the north-central portion of the township. Located outside of Philadelphia, it constitutes part of the Philadelphia metropolitan area.

Originally established in 1686, Middletown Township adopted a Home Rule Charter in 1978. The township is governed by the council-manager system, a representative form of government in which the seven elected officials set policy for the township and the manager oversees the delivery of all public services and programs.

== History ==
Middletown Township was probably established as a township in 1686, but it is first mentioned in 1687 when John Martin was established as constable. The name of the township is believed to be derived from its position in the middle or center of Chester County where it resided until 1789, when Delaware County was created from the eastern portion of Chester County. Delaware County played an important role in the anti-slavery movement. Not only did residents advocate for manumission, noted local families such as the Van Leers bought and sold lots to free black tradesmen or only to people who were supportive of the free black community. The location is now known as Van Leer Avenue. The local community grew with support from local neighbors.

The John J. Tyler Arboretum and Ridley Creek State Park are listed on the National Register of Historic Places.

== Geography ==
Middletown Township is in central Delaware County, west of Media, the county seat, and northwest of Chester. The census-designated place of Lima occupies the north-central part of the township. Other unincorporated communities in the township include Elwyn and Bortondale in the east, Riddlewood near the center, Glen Riddle south of the center, Lenni and Wawa in the southwest.

According to the United States Census Bureau, the township has a total area of 13.5 square miles (34.9 km^{2}), all land. Ridley Creek forms the eastern border of the township, and Chester Creek is the western border. Both creeks flow southeast toward the Delaware River.

Middletown Township straddles the boundary between a hot-summer humid continental climate (Dfa) and a humid subtropical climate (Cfa.) The hardiness zone is 7a.

== Demographics ==
Historical population
Census	Pop.	Note	%±
1930	4,728		—
1940	5,078		7.4%
1950	6,038		18.9%
1960	11,256		86.4%
1970	12,878		14.4%
1980	12,463		−3.2%
1990	14,130		13.4%
2000	16,064		13.7%
2010	15,807		−1.6%
2020	16,373		3.6%
U.S. Decennial Census

As of Census 2010, the racial makeup of the township was 92.3% White, 3.4% African American, 0.1% Native American, 2.8% Asian, 0.6% from other races, and 0.9% from two or more races. Hispanic or Latino of any race were 1.6% of the population .

As of the census of 2000, there were 16,064 people, 5,524 households, and 3,756 families residing in the township. The population density was 1,192.6 inhabitants per square mile (460.5/km^{2}). There were 5,641 housing units at an average density of 418.8 per square mile (161.7/km^{2}). The racial makeup of the township was 94.28% White, 3.08% African American, 0.03% Native American, 1.71% Asian, 0.02% Pacific Islander, 0.16% from other races, and 0.72% from two or more races. Hispanic or Latino of any race were 0.87% of the population.

There were 5,524 households, out of which 29.0% had children under the age of 18 living with them, 59.0% were married couples living together, 6.8% had a female householder with no husband present, and 32.0% were non-families. 28.5% of all households were made up of individuals, and 19.0% had someone living alone who was 65 years of age or older. The average household size was 2.45 and the average family size was 3.05.

In the township the population was spread out, with 20.6% under the age of 18, 6.0% from 18 to 24, 21.8% from 25 to 44, 23.0% from 45 to 64, and 28.7% who were 65 years of age or older. The median age was 46 years. For every 100 females, there were 84.3 males. For every 100 females age 18 and over, there were 79.1 males.

The median income for a household in the township was $62,949, and the median income for a family was $77,649. Males had a median income of $54,495 versus $39,792 for females. The per capita income for the township was $29,418. About 1.1% of families and 2.5% of the population were below the poverty line, including 0.9% of those under age 18 and 3.4% of those age 65 or over.

== Economy ==
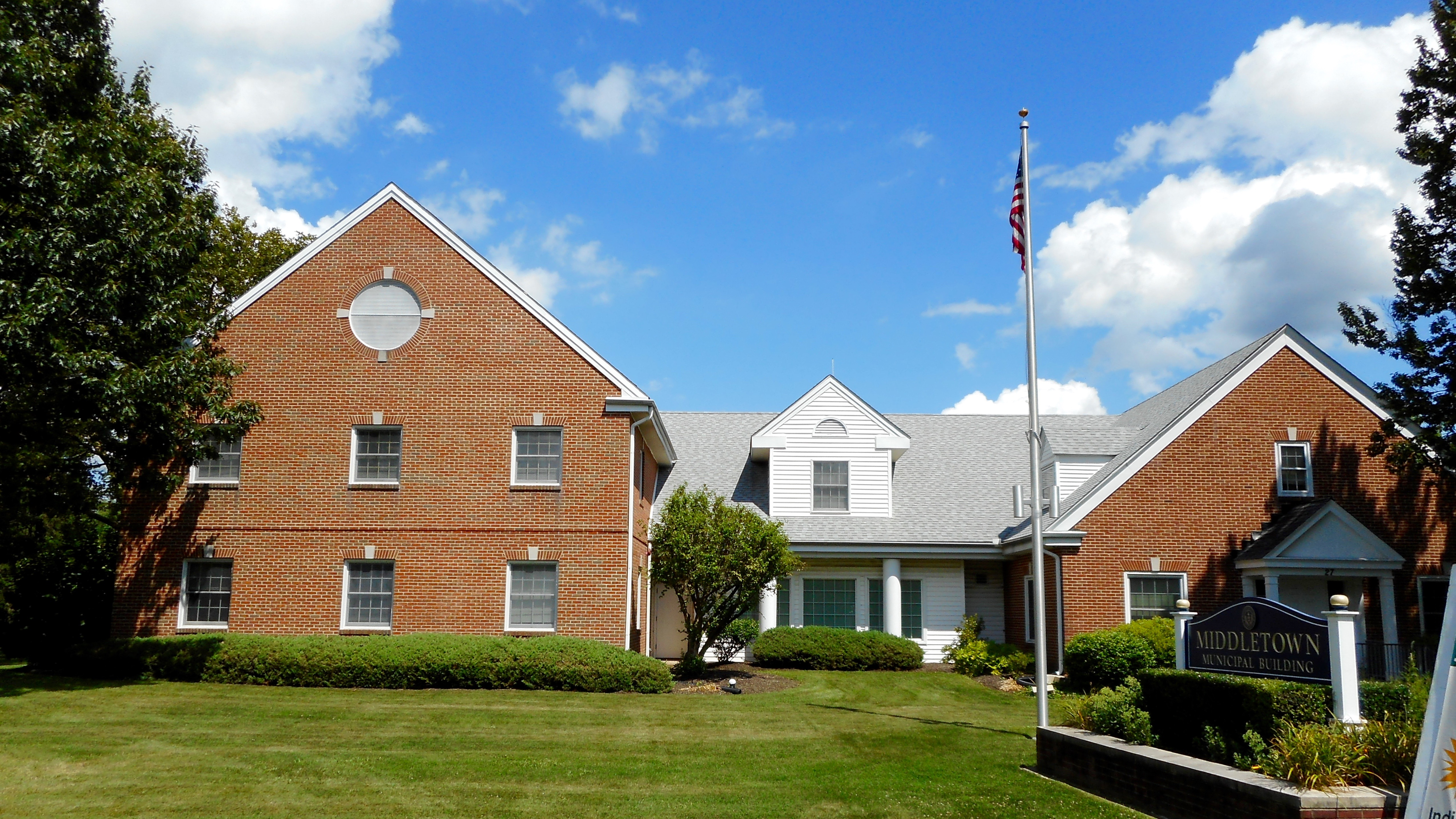
Municipal Building

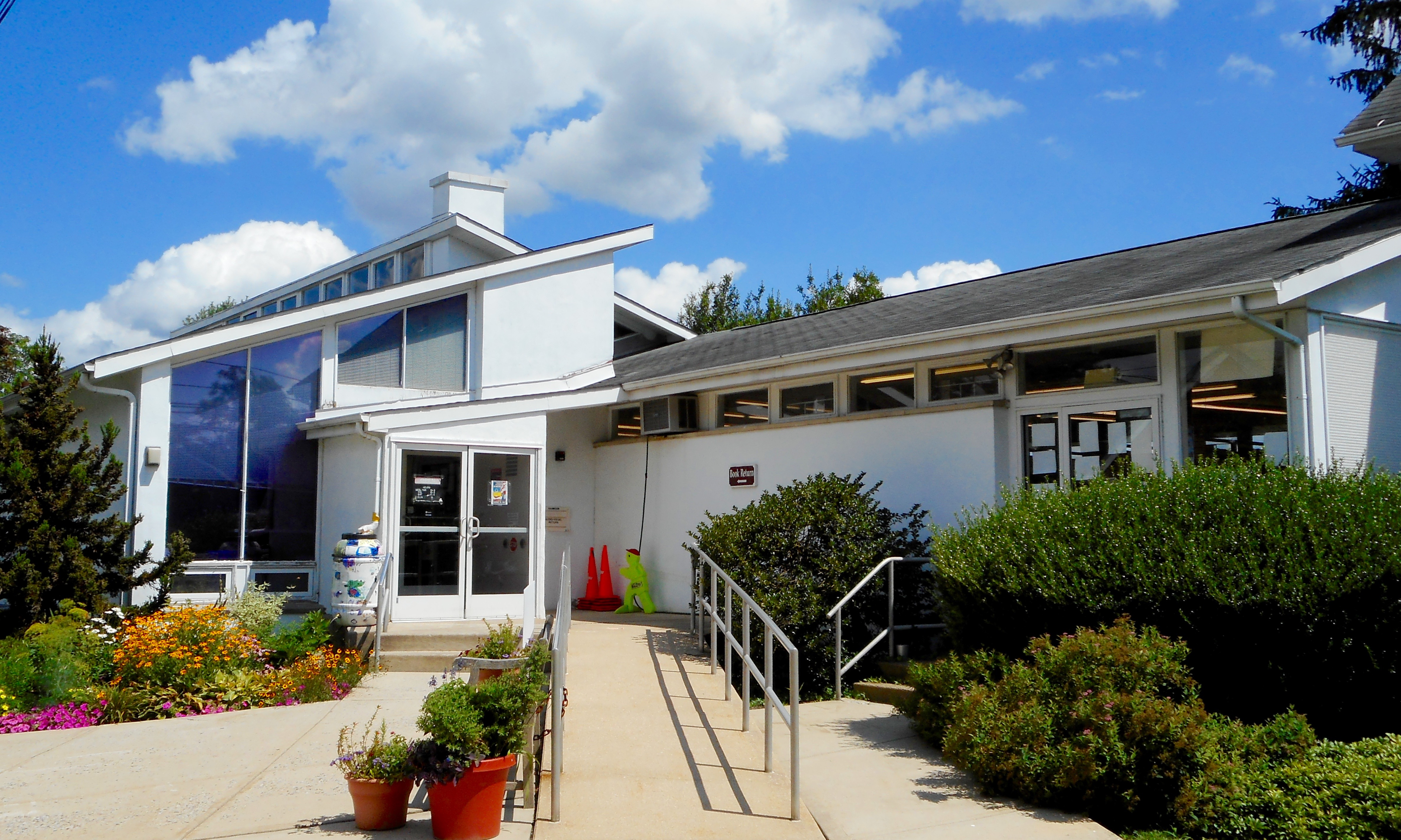
The Free Library, located at the Roosevelt Community Center

Wawa Food Markets has its main dairy plant and "Corporate University" in Middletown, while its headquarters are in Chester Heights, just to the south of the township.

Elwyn Inc., a facility caring for the needs of the developmentally disabled and disadvantaged, is located in Middletown Township.

An enclosed shopping mall called the Granite Run Mall was located in Middletown Township. The mall closed in 2015 and was demolished for a mixed-use development consisting of residential, retail, and entertainment called the Promenade at Granite Run, which opened in 2018.

== Education ==
Middletown Township lies within the Rose Tree Media School District. It was created by a merger between the Media Borough and Rose Tree Union School Districts in 1966.

Public school students residing within township boundaries attend either Glenwood Elementary School, Indian Lane Elementary School (housed in the old Indian Lane Junior High School), Media Elementary School (housed in the old Media Borough High School), or Rose Tree Elementary School for grades K-5, depending on where they live. Springton Lake Middle School serves students in grades 6–8, and Penncrest High School, which is in the township limits, serves students in grades 9–12.

The Middletown Friends School is the only private school located within township boundaries.

For higher education, the township is home to Penn State Brandywine and Williamson College of the Trades.

The township is served by the Middletown Free Library.

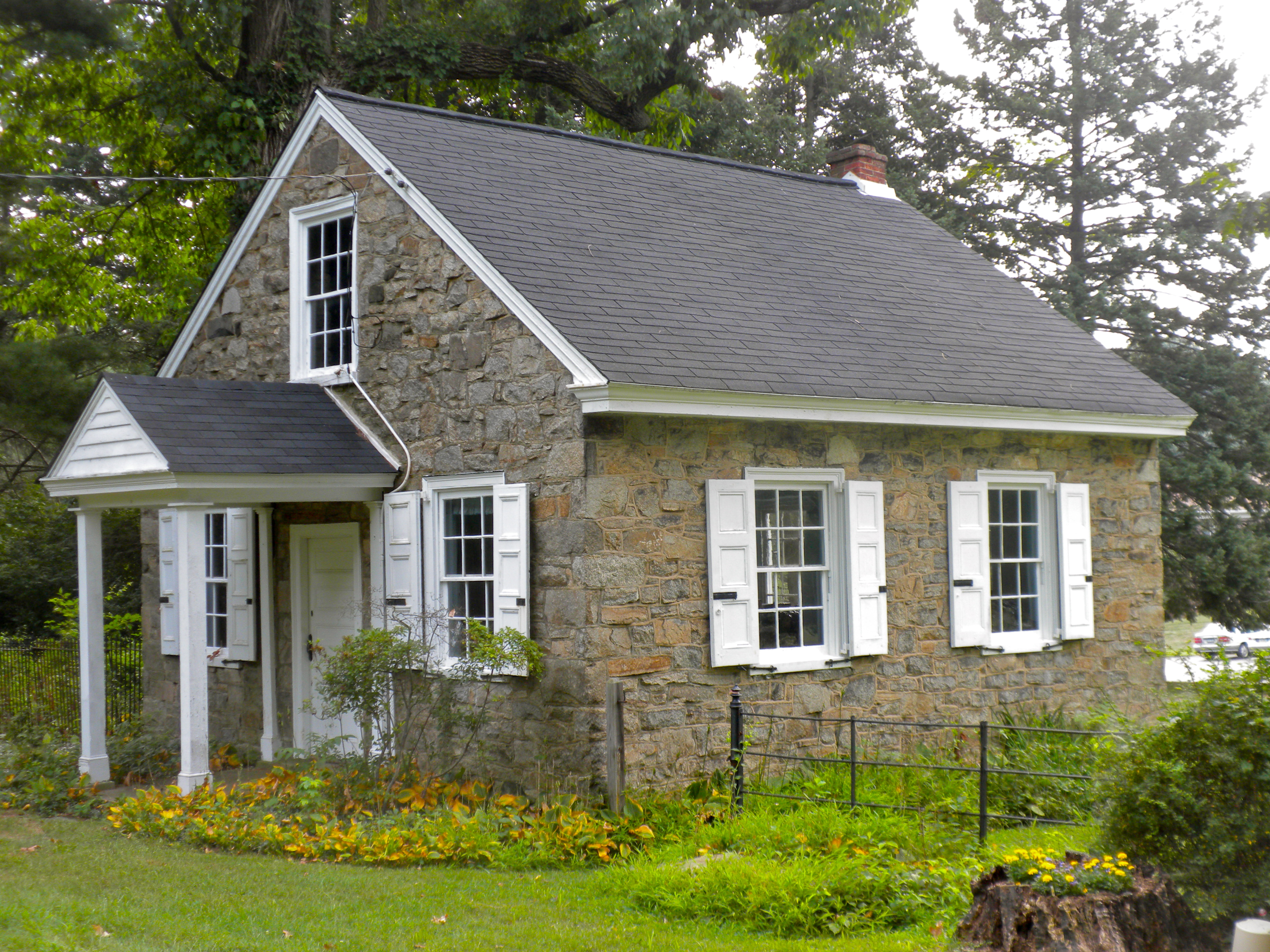
Old school at Middletown Friends Meeting House

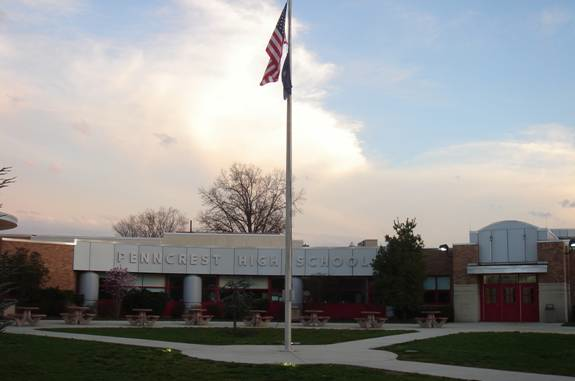
Penncrest High School

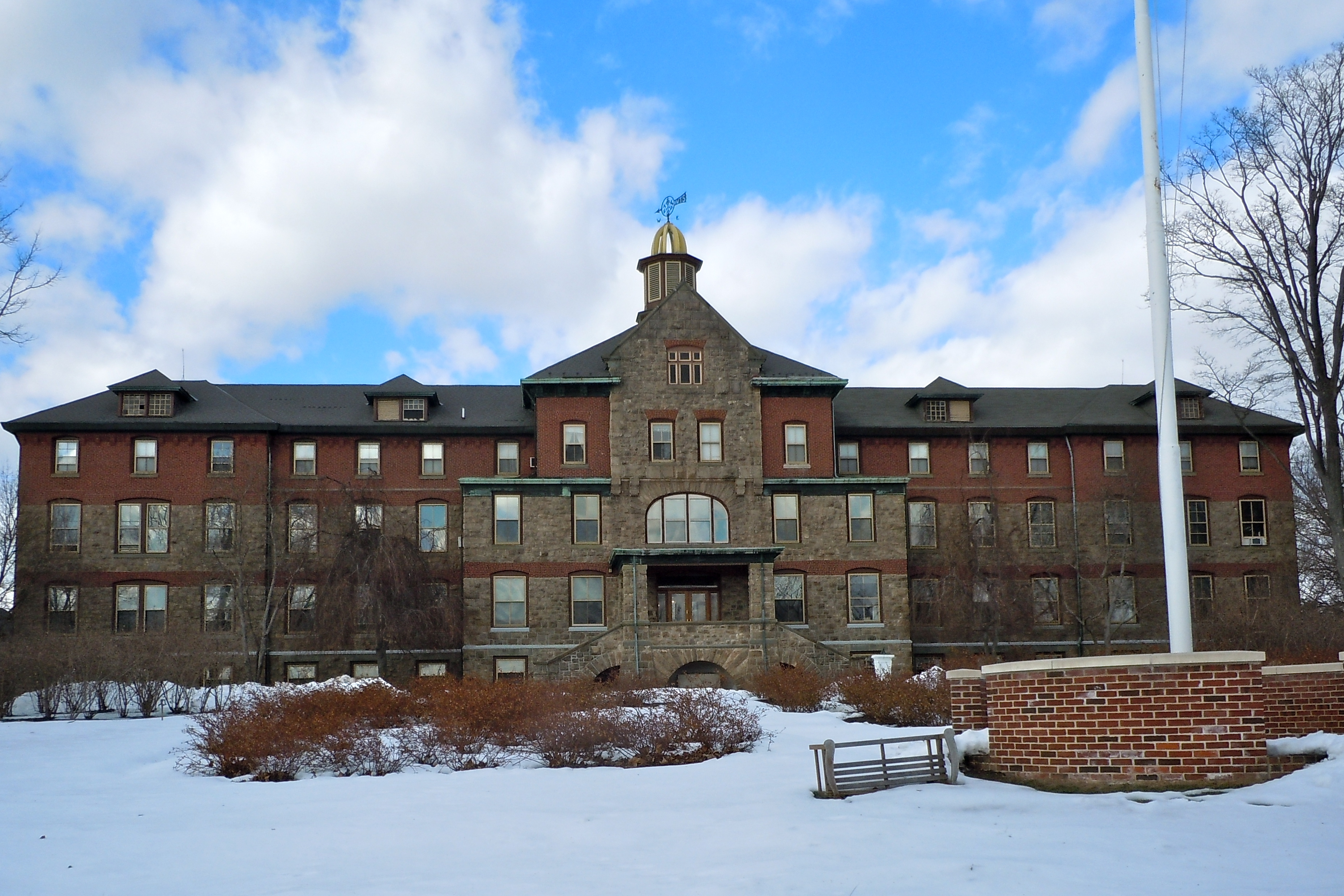
Williamson Free School of Mechanical Trades

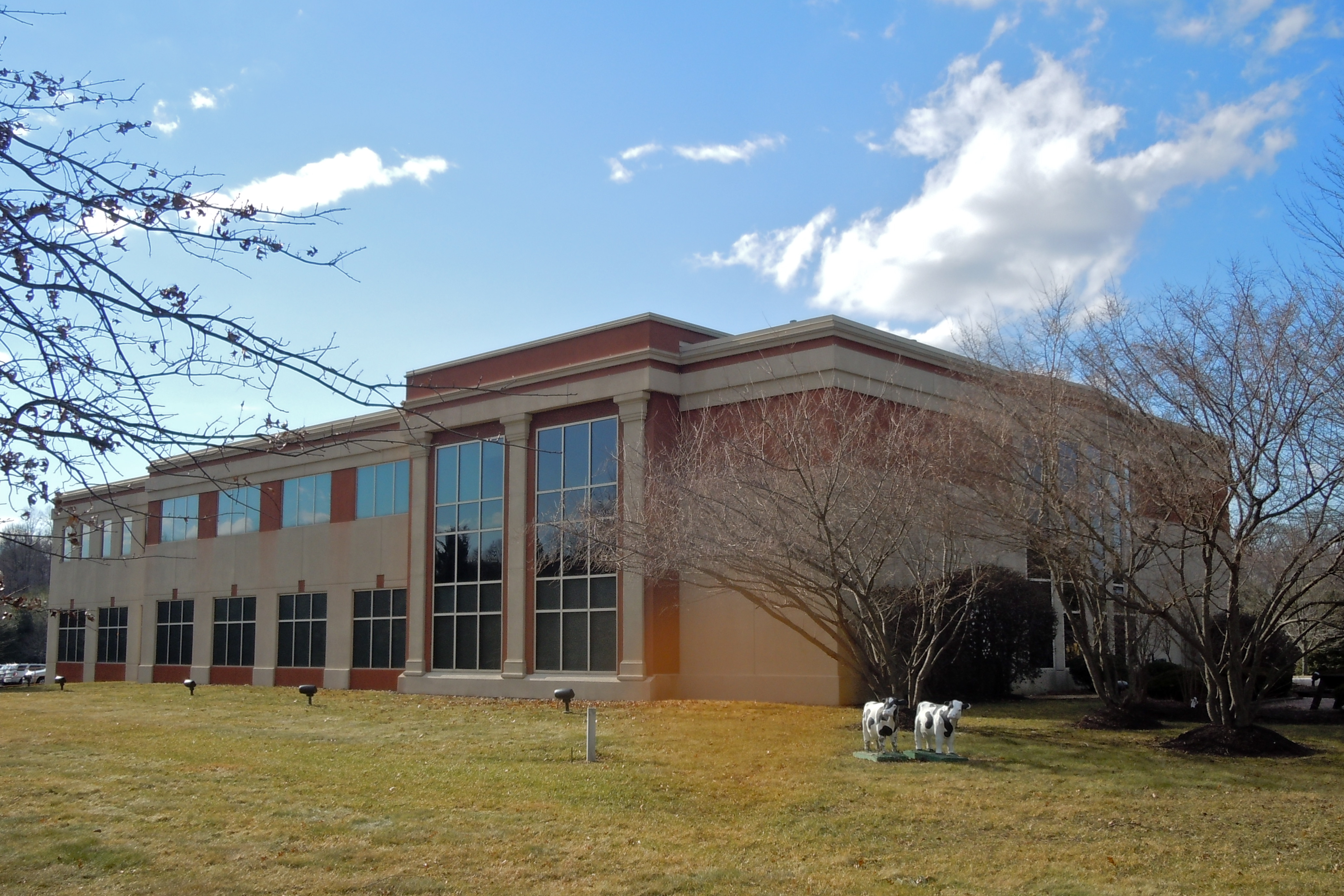
Wawa Corporate Training Center

== Transportation ==
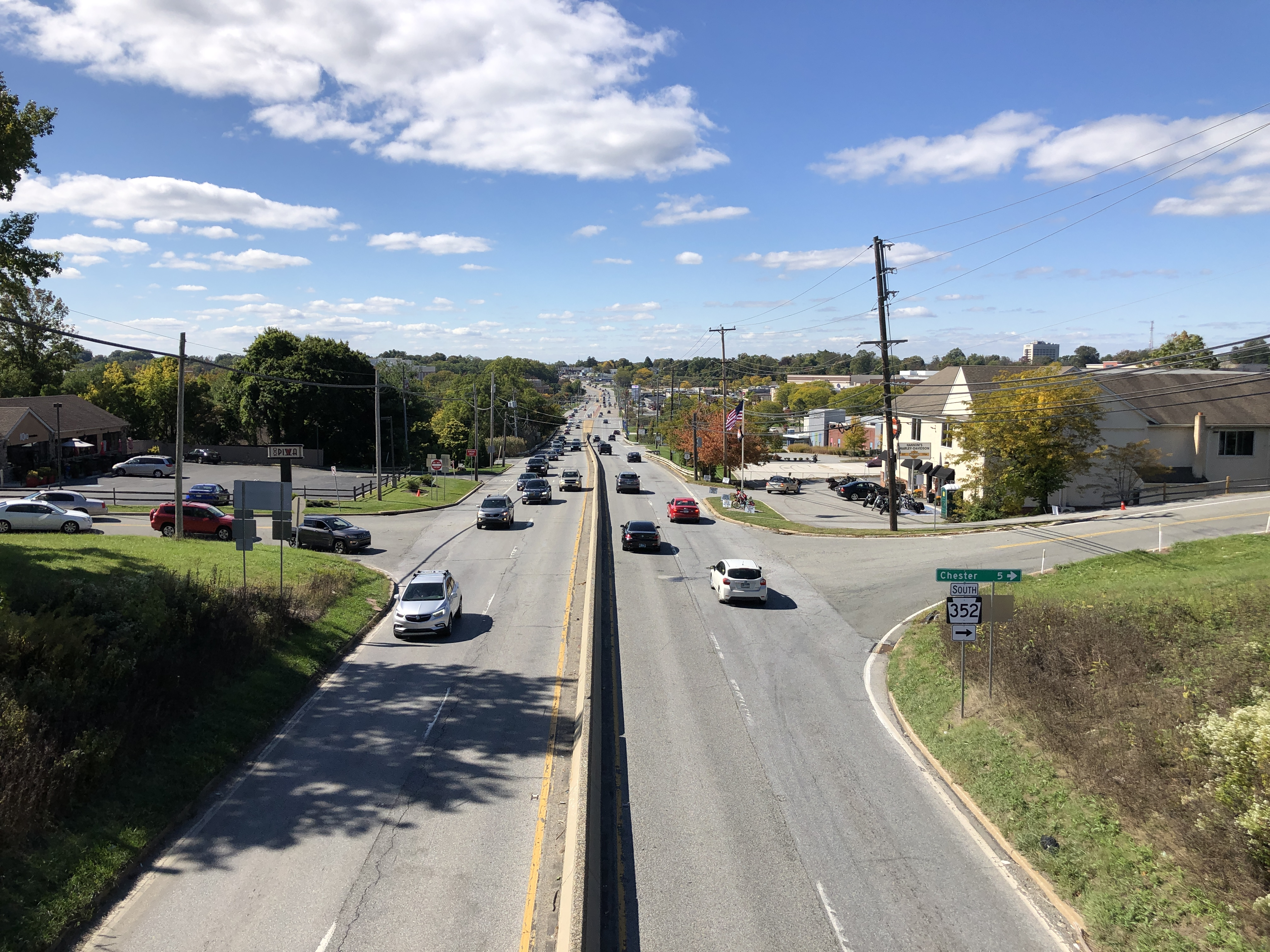
US 1 southbound in Middletown Township

As of 2019, there were 82.78 miles (133.22 km) of public roads in Middletown Township, of which 24.88 miles (40.04 km) were maintained by Pennsylvania Department of Transportation (PennDOT) and 57.90 miles (93.18 km) were maintained by the township.

U.S. Route 1 (Baltimore Pike) passes through the township from southwest to northeast, while Pennsylvania Route 352 crosses it from northwest to southeast. Pennsylvania Route 452 begins at PA 352 in the center of Lima and runs south. The township is 15 miles (24 km) west of Philadelphia's Center City.

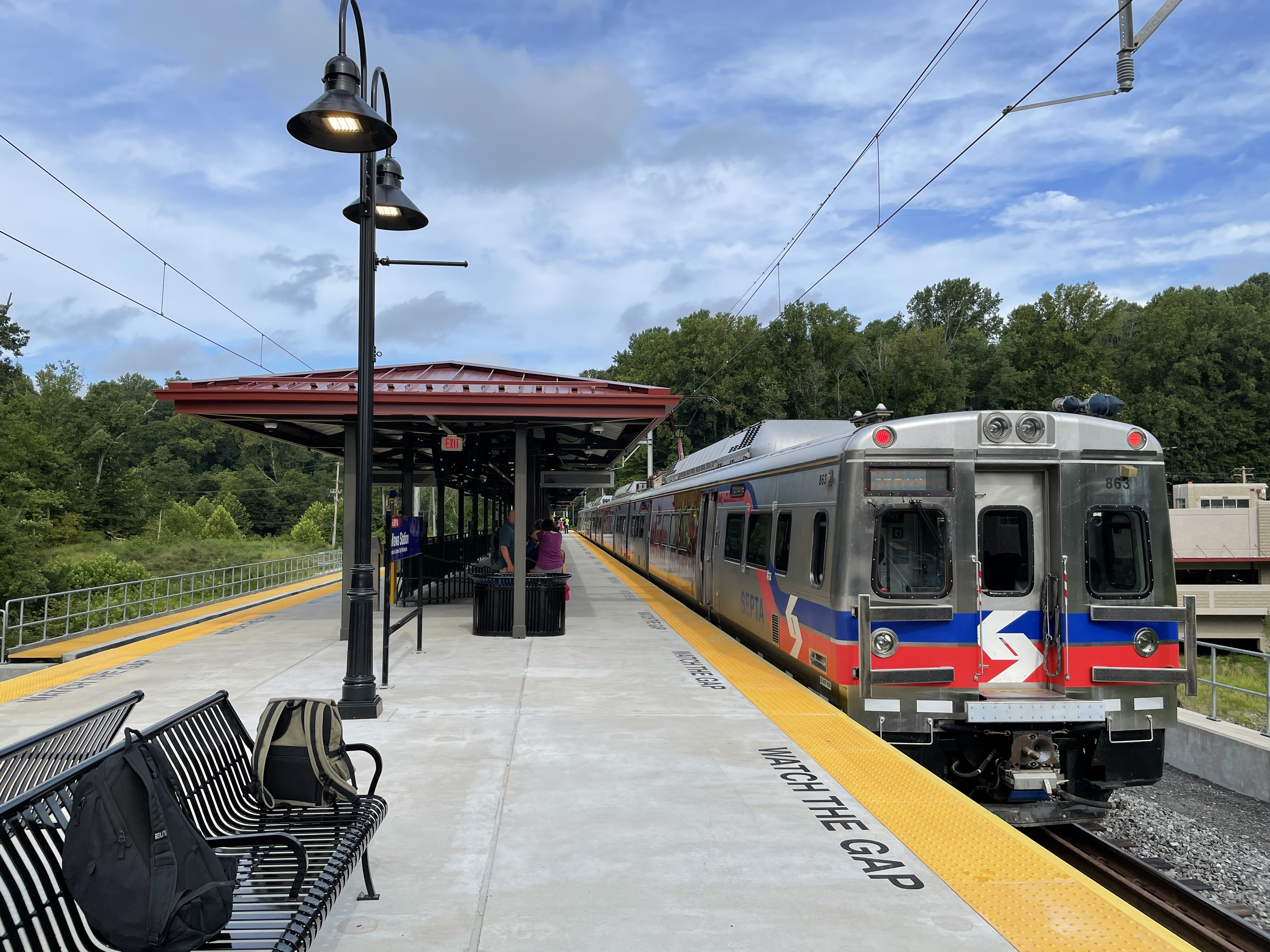
Wawa Station in August 2022

Middletown Township is served by SEPTA Regional Rail's Media/Wawa Line at Wawa Station, which opened on August 21, 2022, with a 600 car garage, and Elwyn station, providing train service to Philadelphia. SEPTA provides Suburban Bus service to Middletown Township along Route 110, which runs between Penn State Brandywine and the 69th Street Transportation Center, Route 111, which runs between Chadds Ford and the 69th Street Transportation Center, Route 114, which runs between Wawa Station and the Darby Transit Center, and Route 117, which runs between Penn State Brandywine and the I-95 Industrial Park.

=== Former train stations ===
- Darlington station (SEPTA)
- Lenni station
- Williamson School station

== Notable people ==
- Edward Darlington – U.S. Congressman
- Joseph McClellan – Continental Army officer and Pennsylvania State Senator
- Samuel Riddle – textile manufacturer

== Fire companies ==
Middletown Township is served by two fire companies, Middletown Fire Company No. 1 and Rocky Run Fire Company. Middletown Fire Company has been in existence since 1922, while Rocky Run Fire Company was chartered in 2013 following a merger between Lima and Lenni Heights Fire Companies. Middletown Fire Company is the designated Rescue company of the Township.

== Other emergency services ==
Police protection is handled by the Pennsylvania State Police. Emergency medical services are handled by Riddle Memorial Hospital's Paramedic Units. Furthermore, Rocky Run Fire Company possesses an ambulance to serve the township. Brookhaven Fire Company AMB-52a-b also commonly takes medical alarms within the township.
