= Tariff (disambiguation) =

A tariff or customs duty is a tax on imported or exported goods.

A tariff may also refer to:

== Economics ==
- Tariff, a schedule of prices for the sale or rental of a product or service
  - Tariff (regulation), a regulated rate

== Other uses ==
- Tariff (criminal law), a minimum prison sentence in British criminal law
- Tariff, Ohio, an unincorporated community in the US
- Tariff (sports), a rating used in several sports
