= Wawa Station =

Commuter rail station in Pennsylvania, US

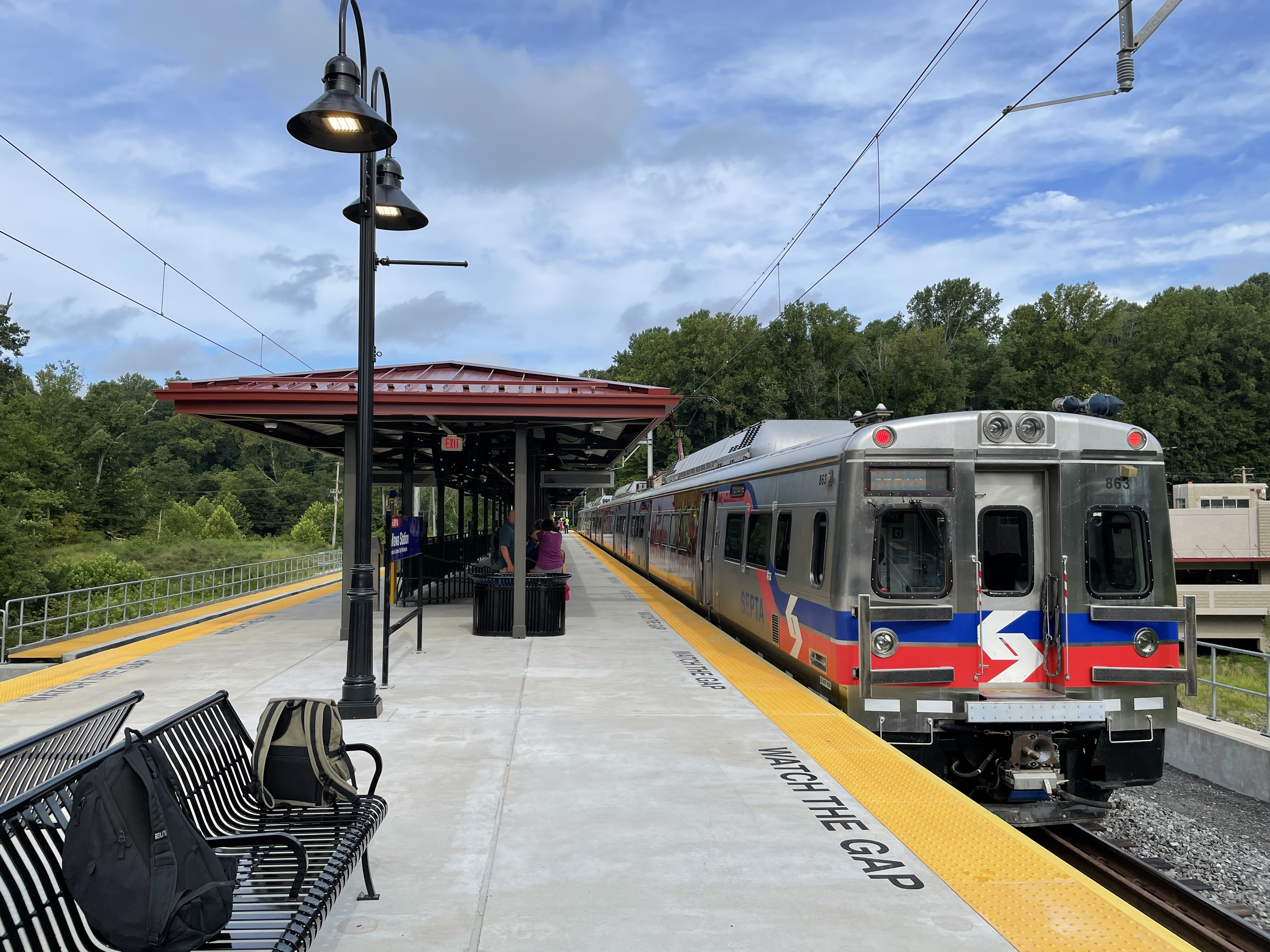
- Wawa Station platform in August 2022.

General information
- Location: 1490 West Baltimore Pike; Media, Pennsylvania
- Coordinates: 39°54.041′N 75°27.514′W
- Owner: SEPTA
- Line: West Chester Line
- Platforms: 1 island platform
- Tracks: 2
- Connections: SEPTA Suburban Bus: 111, 114

Construction
- Accessible: Yes

Other information
- Fare zone: 3

History
- Opened: April 13, 1857
- Closed: September 19, 1986
- Rebuilt: August 21, 2022
- Electrified: December 2, 1928
- Former names: Baltimore Central Junction

Services
Preceding station	SEPTA	Following station
Terminus	Media/Wawa Line	Elwyn toward Temple University
Former services
Preceding station	SEPTA	Following station
Glen Mills toward West Chester	West Chester Line	Lenni toward Suburban Station
Darlington (closed 1981) toward West Chester	West Chester Line	Lenni toward Suburban Station
Preceding station	Pennsylvania Railroad	Following station
Darlington toward West Chester	West Chester Line	Lenni toward Suburban Station
Chester Heights toward Octoraro	Octoraro Branch	Terminus
Location

Wawa Station is a commuter rail station on the SEPTA Regional Rail Media/Wawa Line, located adjacent to U.S. Route 1 in Middletown Township, Delaware County, Pennsylvania. The original station was built by the West Chester and Philadelphia Railroad and later served the Pennsylvania Railroad's West Chester Branch, which finally became SEPTA's R3 line (later renamed to the "Media/Elwyn Line"). The outer section of the line, running from Elwyn to West Chester including the old Wawa station, was closed in 1986.

SEPTA restored service on the Media/Wawa Line from its prior terminus at Elwyn station to Wawa on August 21, 2022.

== History ==
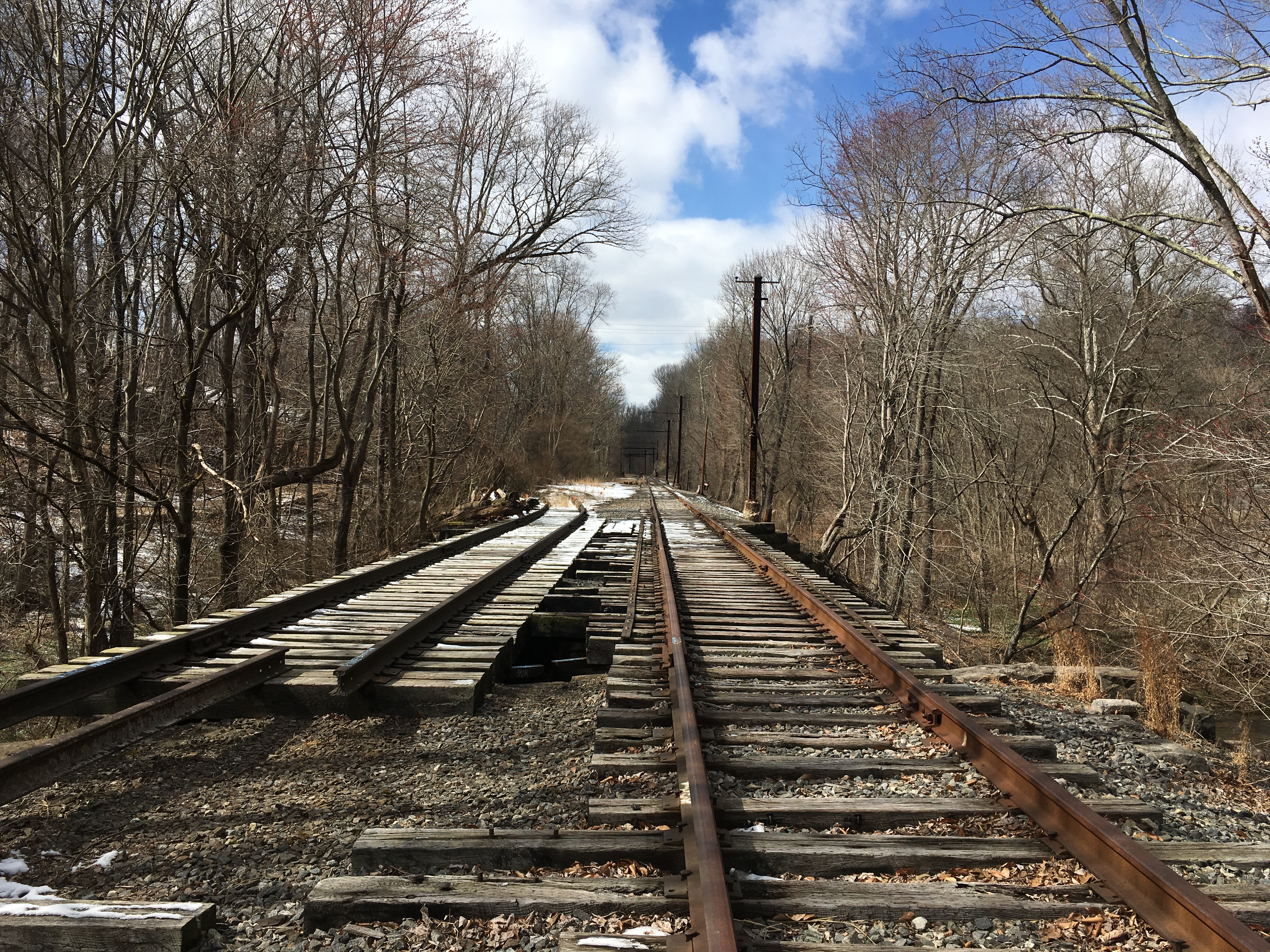
Former Wawa station site in March 2017. The left track formerly diverged to become the Octoraro Branch.

The West Chester and Philadelphia Railroad (WC&P) began constructing its rail line from Philadelphia in 1852 and reached Wawa on April 13, 1857. The remainder of the line to West Chester was completed in 1858. The WC&P merged with the Philadelphia and Baltimore Central Railroad (P&BC) in 1881, and both were controlled by the Pennsylvania Railroad.

Wawa station was originally known as the Baltimore Central Junction Station, being the northern terminus of the P&BC, later called the Octoraro Branch. This line was built by the P&BC between 1855 and 1868, and originally connected with the Columbia & Port Deposit Railroad in Maryland. Tourist operator Wawa & Concordville Railroad leased the Concordville-Wawa segment in 1967 and 1968 to operate passenger trains. Damage caused by Hurricane Agnes 1972 rendered the line unusable.

The station was closed in September 1986, along with all of those west of Elwyn station, due to deteriorating track conditions and Chester County's desire to expand facilities at Exton station on SEPTA's Paoli/Thorndale Line. Service was "temporarily suspended" at that time, with substitute bus service provided. Prior to the end of service, trains had not been through-routed to Philadelphia for many years, instead operating as a shuttle between Elwyn and West Chester. Wawa station still appeared in publicly posted tariffs while unused.

Wawa station was demolished shortly after service ended. Some concrete foundations remained, as did the concrete curb for the platform edge, and the pedestrian tunnel under the track. The pedestrian tunnel was sealed off with sheets of metal. All structures remaining on site were demolished in 2020 in order to construct the new station.

=== Service restoration ===
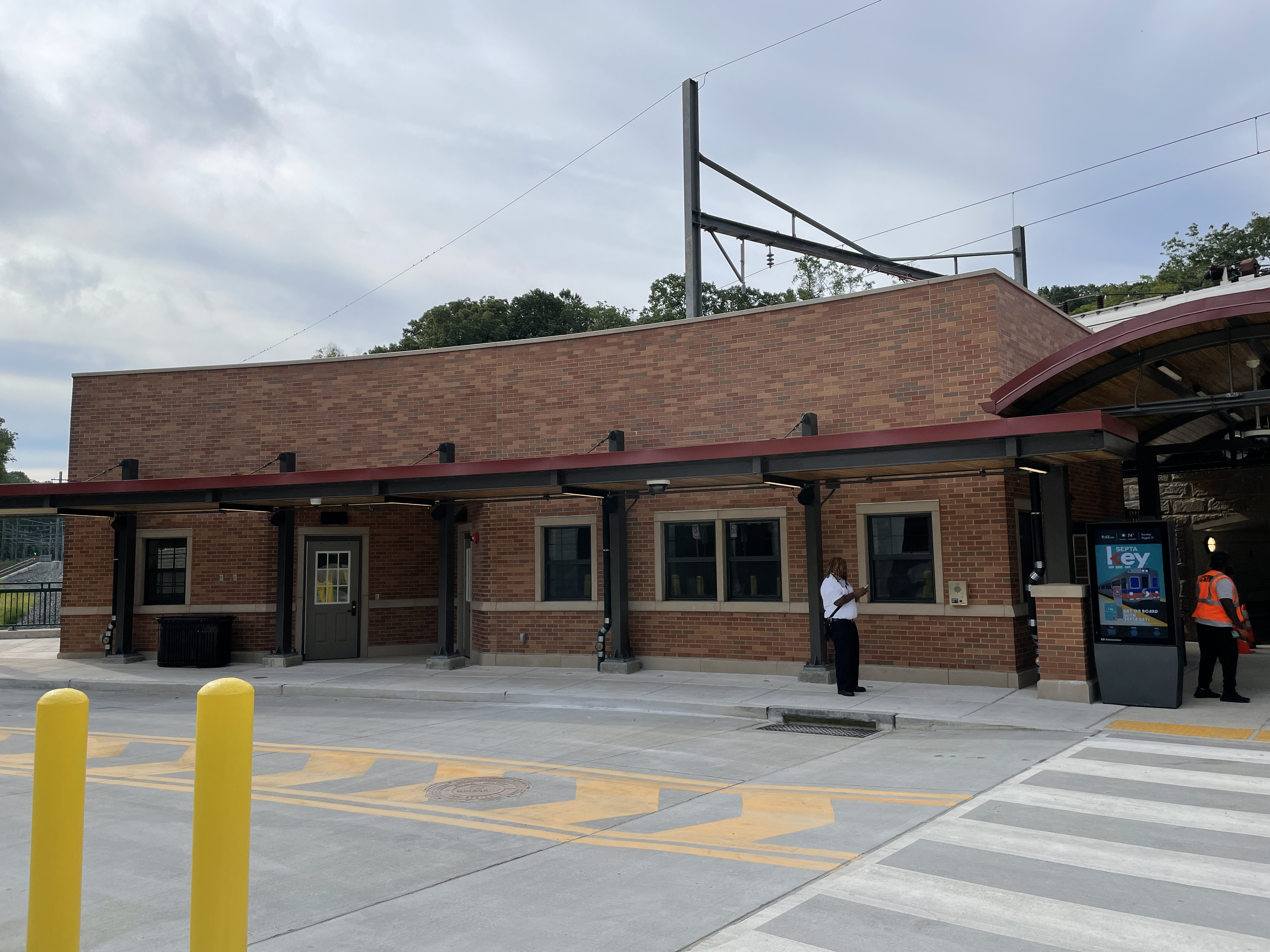
Wawa Station building in August 2022

In the early 1990s, SEPTA began discussing the prospect of restoring commuter rail service between Elwyn and Wawa. Little was done until June 2005, when engineering and design for the resumption of rail service finally began. SEPTA initially estimated that the cost for the 3-mile extension of service would be $51 million; the estimate cited in SEPTA's 2009 Capital Budget was $80 million. The construction project included new track, catenary, signals, communications equipment, and crew facilities. A new station at Wawa with a large park and ride facility will also have been built.

Wawa was chosen as the new terminal due to its proximity to the heavily travelled U.S. Route 1, in addition to the headquarters of convenience store chain Wawa. In 2006, the Wawa chain sold a 4.7-acre plot of land for the station. The new Wawa Station, which was briefly referred to as "Middletown" for its location in Middletown Township, was under construction in late 2020. The accessible-compliant station has high level platforms, ticket machines, a waiting area, a parking garage, and bike racks. The station was built with a connection to a future trail and a pedestrian culvert was built for an extension of the Chester Creek Trail. The waiting area is open only on weekdays from 4:30am to 11:30am. While some earlier reporting stated that the station would include a ticket office and food service, the final build did not include those. SEPTA also constructed a new railcar storage facility and crew bunker at the former Lenni station site.

When in the planning stage, Wawa Station was estimated to be used by about 950 commuters on a typical weekday. The engineering phase of the terminal project began in July 2005. This included preliminary engineering, environmental impact analysis, and final engineering. Shortfalls in funding delayed completion of this phase due to the failing economy in 2008. SEPTA announced in 2015 in their "Rebuilding for the Future" project that service is expected to return to Wawa Station by, at the latest, 2020. Construction will take 24 to 36 months to complete. As of May 2018, the total budget has been revised to $177,900,000 with construction being complete in 2021. As of January 2022, passenger service was expected to start in July 2022.

In an update published on Middletown Township's website, it was originally planned for all construction to be completed by June 2022, with passenger service beginning on July 1, 2022. On May 23, 2022, it was announced that the start of passenger service would be delayed until August 21, 2022, due to supply chain issues. Training and qualifying runs along the new portion of the branch were conducted throughout June and July 2022.

On July 27, 2022, SEPTA announced that convenience store chain Wawa acquired naming rights to the station for $5.4 million in a 10-year deal. A ribbon-cutting ceremony for Wawa Station was held on August 18, 2022, with SEPTA and Wawa leadership in attendance including Wawa President and CEO Chris Gheysens. Following the ceremony, a train with a Wawa advertising wrap took a trip on the extension from Wawa to Elwyn. Regular service began on Sunday, August 21, 2022. On August 22, Wawa provided free celebratory coffee, pretzels, and drinks to commuters. With the opening of the station, the Media/Elwyn Line was renamed the Media/Wawa Line.

On August 29, 2022, SEPTA Suburban Bus routes 111 and 114 began onsite service to Wawa Station.

=== Transit-oriented development ===
In 2007, transit-oriented development was studied for Wawa station, with Delaware Valley, Delaware County, and Middletown Township in support for development at the station. The area was low-density at the time of the study, with the land's zoning unfavorable for dense development. A private development group proposed to construct a 153-acre "mixed-use town center" on The Franklin Mint site, east of the station in 2006. This includes 1,300 housing units made up of townhouses and loft apartments. Separate proposals included office space, retail, and hotel space. In December 2006, survey work was done on the land which found it feasible to build housing and office on the site. Some residents disagreed with the plan as they perceived that the development would bring higher traffic and put pressure on the school system.

In 2018, the station's surroundings was established as a "Transit Revitalization Investment District." By July 2023, the Franklin Mint development project, known as "Franklin station," planned to have 267 housing units, with 85% completed and sold. The Ponds Edge development added another 197 units, with 40% completed and sold at that time. These projects were projected to cost $410.8 million and were planned to be completed in 2025. This development increased the investment district's taxable value and the program is funded until 2033. A trail was completed between the station and the development on December 5, 2024. As of 2026, Franklin station is open as townhomes and single-family homes.
