= Cheyney station =

Train station in Pennsylvania, US

Cheyney
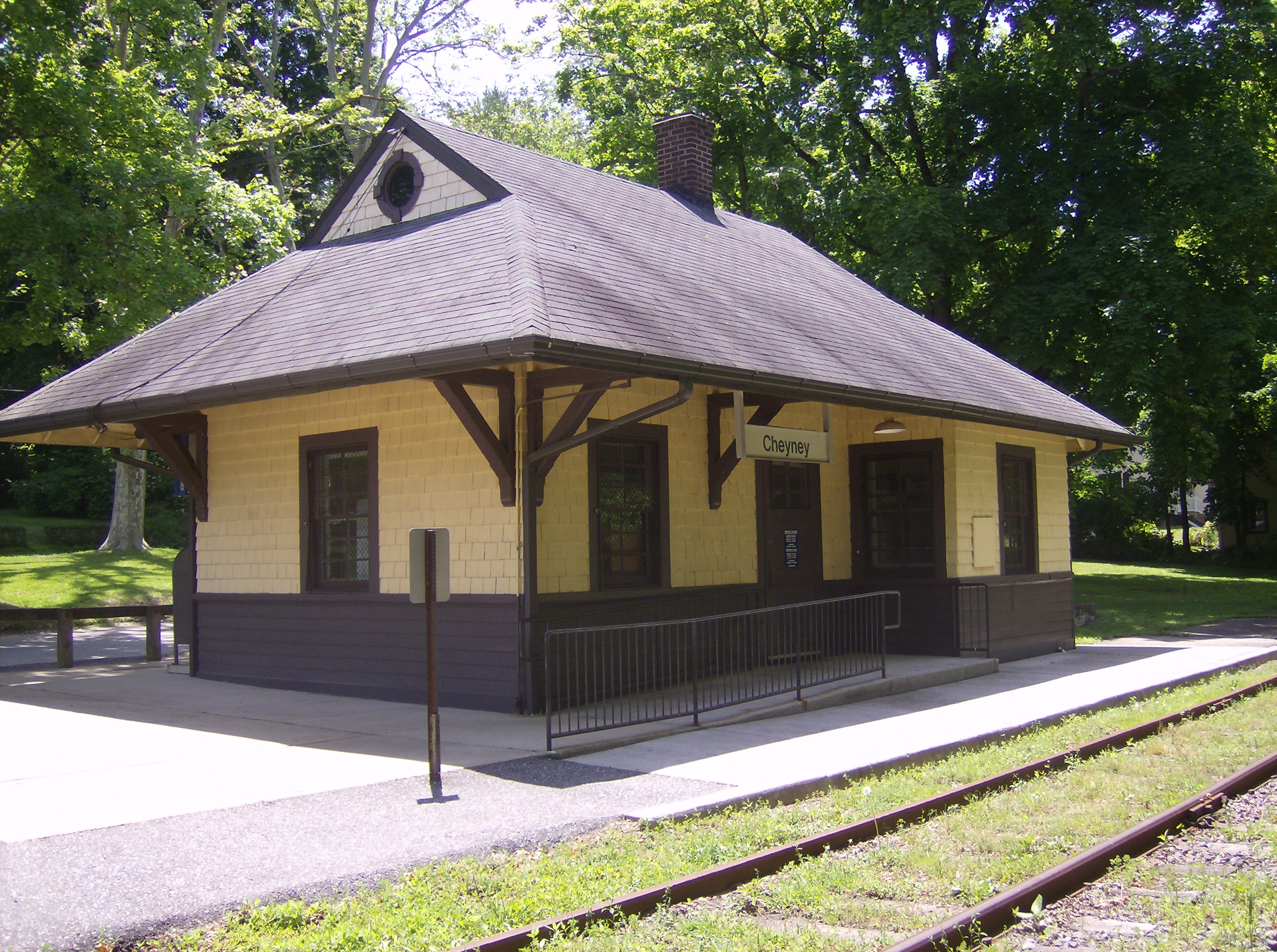
- Cheyney station depot, circa 2010; SEPTA signage hangs from canopy.

General information
- Location: 119 Station Road, Thornbury Township, Pennsylvania 19319
- Coordinates: 39.9307°N 75.5187°W
- System: West Chester Railroad tourist railroad station
- Owner: West Chester Railroad
- Lines: Pennsylvania Railroad, SEPTA R3 West Chester Line
- Platforms: 1 side platform
- Tracks: 1

Construction
- Structure type: Wooden frame structure
- Parking: yes

History
- Opened: October 23, 1858 (West Chester and Philadelphia Railroad); June 1997 (West Chester Railroad)
- Closed: September 19, 1986
- Rebuilt: 1900
- Electrified: December 2, 1928

Services
Preceding station	West Chester Railroad	Following station
Westtown toward West Chester	Main Line	Locksley toward Glen Mills
Former services
Preceding station	SEPTA	Following station
Westtown toward West Chester	West Chester Line	Glen Mills toward Suburban Station
Westtown toward West Chester	West Chester Line	Locksley (closed 1981) toward Suburban Station
Preceding station	Pennsylvania Railroad	Following station
Westtown toward West Chester	West Chester Line	Locksley toward Suburban Station
Location

Cheyney station is a train station in Thornbury Township, Delaware County, Pennsylvania. It currently serves as a stop on the West Chester Railroad tourist railroad line, and previously served as a station for the Pennsylvania Railroad and SEPTA.

== History ==
Originally called Cheyney's Shops station, the station was originally located in a brick structure (now a private residence) that still stands on Station Road just east of Cheyney Road. The current station building is home to the Cheyney Post Office. The original "Cheyney's Shops" dated from the late 18th century and were located on the north west and north east corners of the intersection of Creek and Cheyney Roads. The original Cheyney Post Office was located there.

William Cheyney was the first postmaster in 1835. When the railroad came through Cheyney, the post office was moved to Station Road. There are old maps that show "Cheyney" to be located at the intersection of Creek and Cheyney Roads. All the newer maps show the location of "Cheyney" to be on Station Road.

The last remaining portion of the Cheyney's Shops are on the north east corner of Creek and Cheyney Roads. Cheyney University tore down all the original buildings located on the north west corner in the late 1960s or early 1970s. This group of buildings consisted of a Hotel, General Store/Post Office and Blacksmiths shop as well as a large bank barn. A stone Wheelwrights shop and two other related original buildings are located on the opposite corner and still survive today.

The current station was built in 1900 by the Philadelphia, Wilmington and Baltimore Railroad. It was managed by the Pennsylvania Railroad after the companies merged, and was later taken over by SEPTA for SEPTA Regional Rail's R3 West Chester Line. SEPTA discontinued regular passenger service in September 1986, due to deteriorating track conditions and Chester County's desire to expand facilities at Exton station on the Paoli/Thorndale Line. Service was restored by the West Chester Railroad in 1997, a privately owned and operated heritage railway that operates between Glen Mills and West Chester on weekends.
