= Westtown station =

Railway station in Thornbury Township, Pennsylvania

Westtown
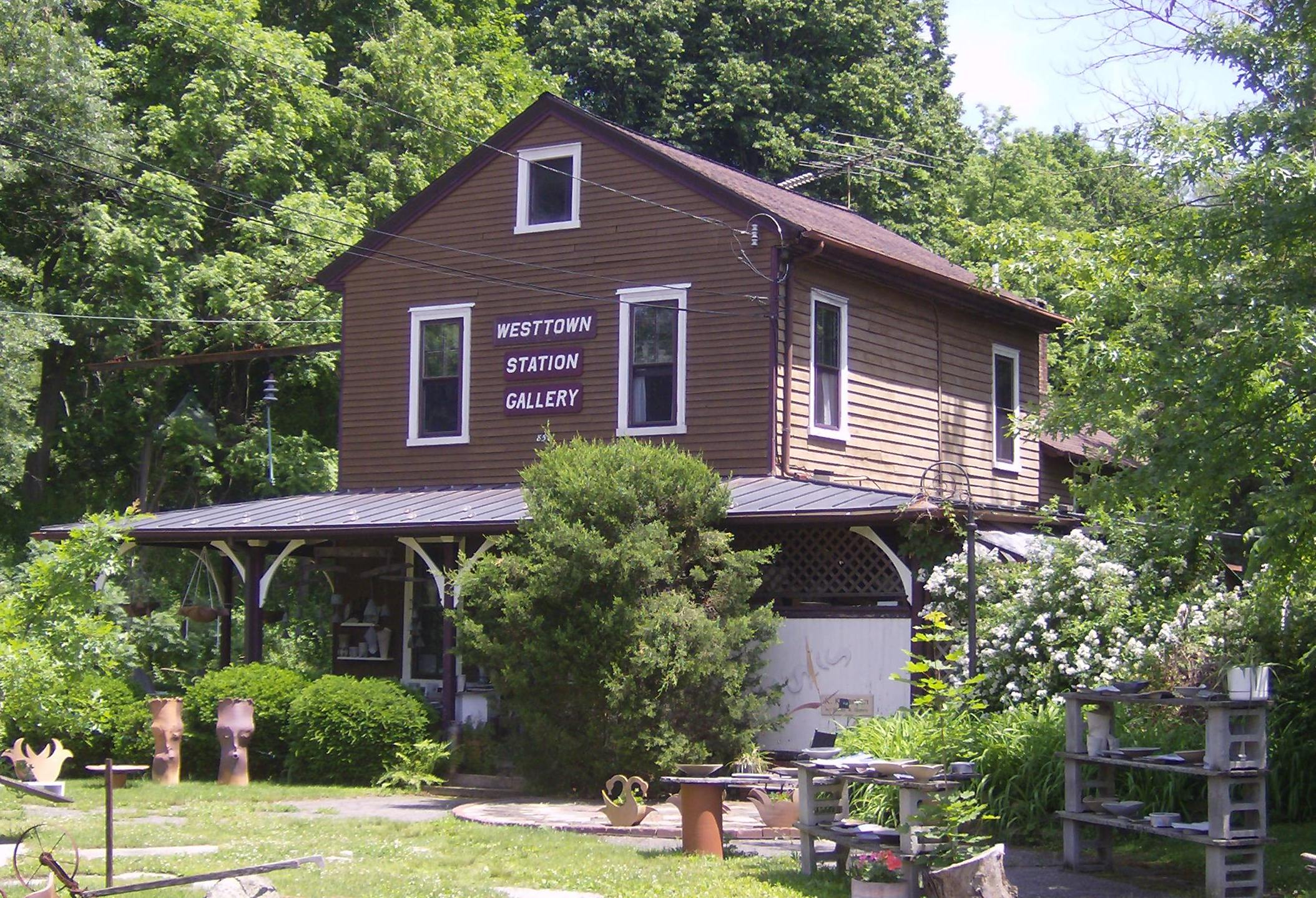
- The restored Westtown station, now in use as an art gallery

General information
- Location: 850 Street Road (PA 962), Thornbury Township, Pennsylvania 19382
- Coordinates: 39.93193°N 75.54915°W
- System: West Chester Railroad tourist train station
- Owner: West Chester Railroad
- Lines: Pennsylvania Railroad, SEPTA R3 West Chester Line
- Platforms: 1 side platform
- Tracks: 1

Construction
- Structure type: Frame building

History
- Opened: October 23, 1858 (West Chester and Philadelphia Railroad); June 1997 (West Chester Railroad)
- Closed: September 19, 1986
- Electrified: December 2, 1928
- Former names: Street Road

Services
Preceding station	West Chester Railroad	Following station
West Chester Terminus	Main Line	Cheyney toward Glen Mills
Former services
Preceding station	SEPTA	Following station
West Chester University toward West Chester	West Chester Line	Cheyney toward Suburban Station
Preceding station	Pennsylvania Railroad	Following station
Oakbourne toward West Chester	West Chester Line	Cheyney toward Suburban Station
Location

Westtown station is a railroad station in Thornbury Township, Chester County, Pennsylvania. It currently serves as a stop on the West Chester Railroad heritage railway as well as an art gallery.

The station was a stop on the Pennsylvania Railroad's (PRR) West Chester Line, and later became a part of SEPTA's R3 West Chester Line. SEPTA discontinued service in 1986, and the West Chester Railroad resurrected the line for recreational excursions in 1997.

== History ==
Westtown station was built in 1858 by the West Chester and Philadelphia Railroad and was originally called Street Road station, but was renamed "Westtown" in 1888. The Westtown Post Office was established there in 1871, though it has since moved to a new site in an adjacent building.

SEPTA discontinued regular passenger service in September 1986, due to deteriorating track conditions and Chester County's desire to expand facilities at Exton station on SEPTA's Paoli/Thorndale Line.

Service was restored by the West Chester Railroad in 1997, a privately owned and operated heritage railway that operates between Glen Mills and West Chester on weekends. The station still stands and is home to an art gallery run by Kenneth Kazanjian, a potter, and Shelly Shultis, a painter.
