= Darlington station (SEPTA) =

Former rail station in Pennsylvania, US

Darlington
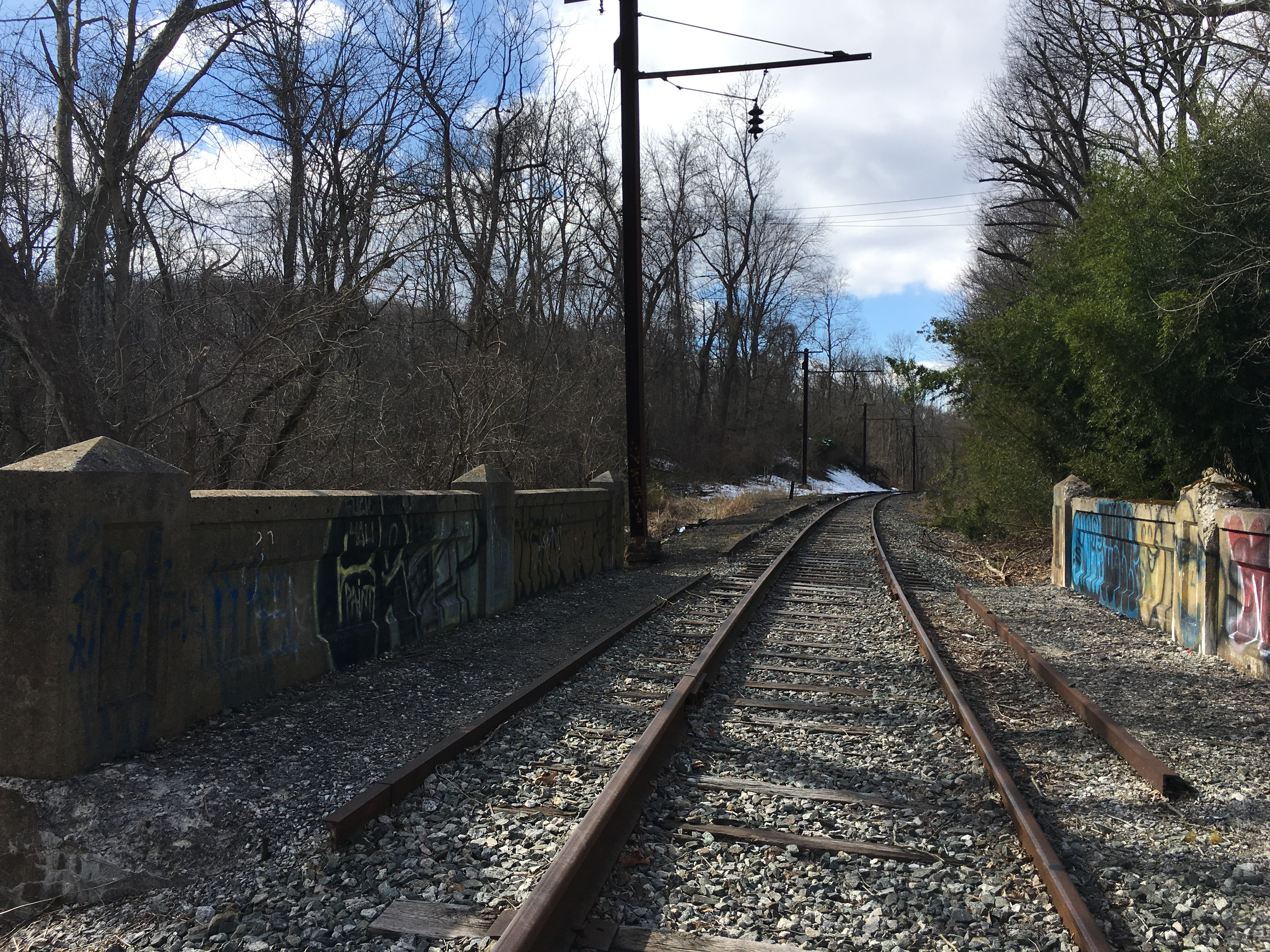
- Former Darlington station site in March 2017.

General information
- Location: Darlington Road, Chester Heights, Pennsylvania
- Coordinates: 39.9039°N 75.4692°W
- System: Former SEPTA Regional Rail station
- Owner: SEPTA
- Line: West Chester Line
- Platforms: 1 side platform
- Tracks: 1

Construction
- Structure type: demolished

History
- Closed: October 4, 1981
- Electrified: December 2, 1928

Former services
Preceding station	SEPTA	Following station
Glen Mills toward West Chester	West Chester Line	Wawa Station toward Suburban Station
Preceding station	Pennsylvania Railroad	Following station
Glen Mills toward West Chester	West Chester Line	Wawa toward Suburban Station
Location

Darlington station is a defunct commuter rail station on the SEPTA Regional Rail R3 West Chester Line, located at 612 Darlington Road in Chester Heights, Pennsylvania. Originally built by the West Chester and Philadelphia Railroad, it later served the Pennsylvania Railroad's West Chester Branch, which finally became SEPTA's R3 line.

The station, and all of those west of Elwyn station, was closed in September 1986, due to deteriorating track conditions and Chester County's desire to expand facilities at Exton station on SEPTA's Paoli/Thorndale Line. Service was "temporarily suspended" at that time, with substitute bus service provided. Darlington station still appears in publicly posted tariffs. Darlington station was named after the dairy located at that place. For years it was a flag stop, but was abandoned and then re-established. However, the depot at Darlington station was demolished shortly after service ended. The concrete curb for the platform edge and the access road are all that remain.

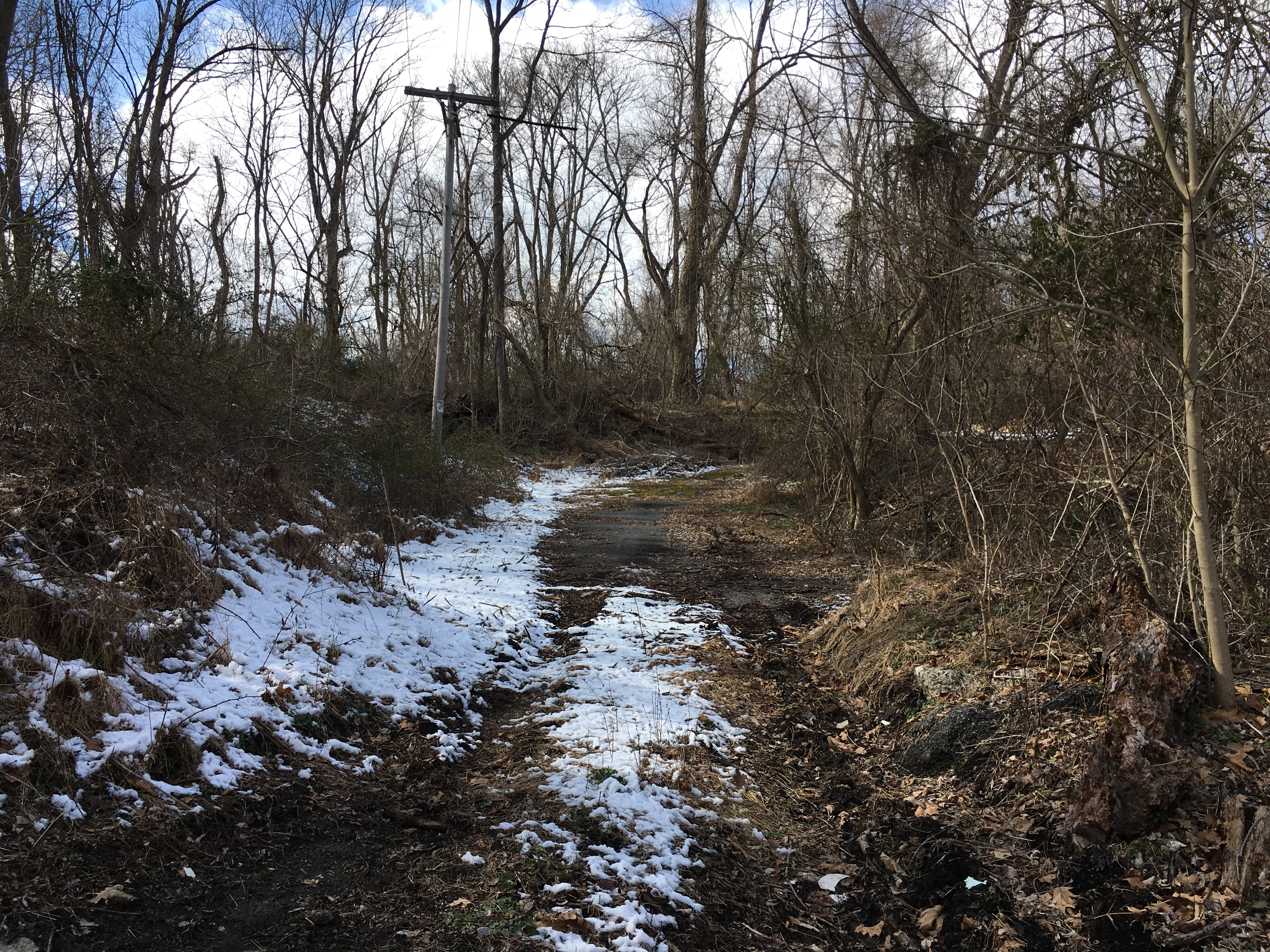
Looking up the access road to the former Darlington station in 2017

== Darling, Pennsylvania ==
A post office was established at the station in 1879, which led to the place name Darling being officially recognized. The GNIS classifies it as a populated place with "Darlington" recognized as a variant. The post office remained in operation until 1964. "Darling" was used to prevent confusion with the town of Darlington located in Beaver County, Pennsylvania.

1896 Decision Card
