= West Chester Railroad (1831–1903) =

Map

The West Chester Railroad (WCRR) was chartered in 1831 and began operation in 1832. The railroad line ran from West Chester, Pennsylvania, for 9 miles (14 km) to Malvern, Pennsylvania, where it connected with the Philadelphia and Columbia Railroad. Service was originally provided with horse-drawn cars.

The rail line originally terminated in West Chester near the corner of East Chestnut and North Matlack Streets. The railroad opened a 1.75-mile long branch line from Kirkland to Oakland to serve nearby lime and marble quarries before making a connection with the Philadelphia and Columbia. When locomotives were introduced to the railroad in 1845, it was determined that the iron-plated wooden rails had deteriorated beyond repair and the branch was abandoned. The first permanent station was built in 1846 and the line was rebuilt in the late 1840s to support steam locomotives. The line was later routed to terminate at the East Market Street station of the West Chester and Philadelphia Railroad (WC&P).

The Pennsylvania Railroad (PRR) took over the Philadelphia and Columbia Railroad in 1857, and began leasing the West Chester Railroad in 1859, though they lost control of the railroad after the WC&P acquired the entire capital stock of the West Chester Railroad. The WC&P ended the 1870s in a poor financial situation however, and as a result sold the entirety of the West Chester Railroad's stock to the PRR for $135,300. The West Chester Railroad remained a subsidiary of the PRR until it was merged into the latter company in 1903. The PRR re-routed the northern end of the line to a connection with the main line at Frazer in 1880, and subsequently the line was known as the "Frazer Branch." The PRR ended passenger service on the Frazer Branch in 1932, while service continued on the WC&P line (known until then as the "Media Branch," and later as the "West Chester Branch") until 1986. The majority of the Frazer Branch was removed from service in April 1969, with the truncated remainder surviving until about 1981.

The currently-operating West Chester Railroad is a tourist railroad which runs trains between West Chester and Glen Mills, Pennsylvania, on the Media/West Chester Branch.

== See also ==
- List of defunct Pennsylvania railroads
- West Chester Branch (PRR)
