= Locksley station (Pennsylvania) =

Railway station in Thornbury Township, Pennsylvania

Locksley
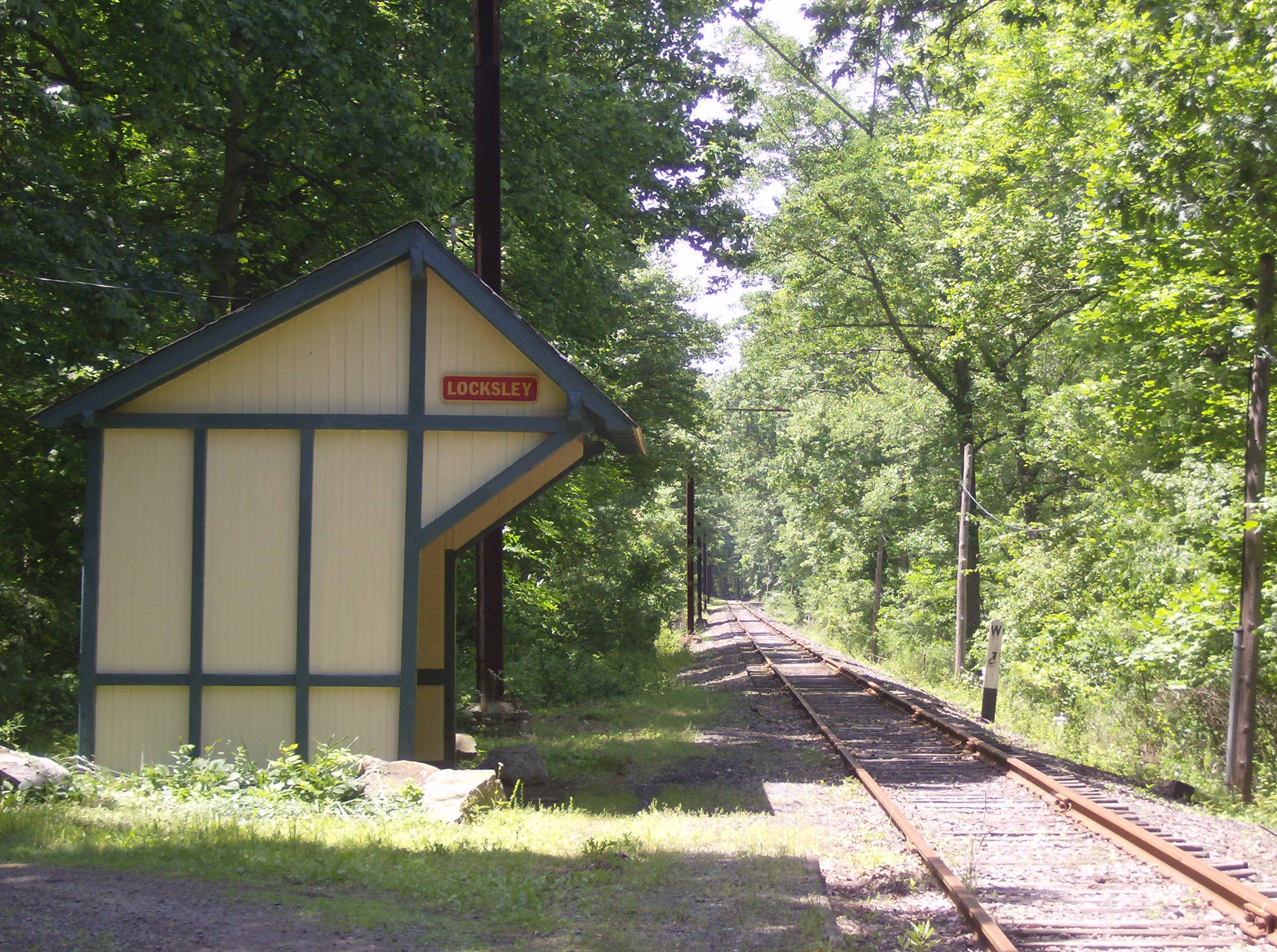
- Locksley station shelter, c. 2010. Pennsylvania Railroad style-signage can be seen adorning the shelter.

General information
- Location: 101 Locksley Road, Thornbury Township, Pennsylvania 19319
- Coordinates: 39.9306°N 75.5058°W
- System: West Chester Railroad tourist railroad station
- Owner: West Chester Railroad
- Platforms: 1 side platform
- Tracks: 1

Construction
- Structure type: shelter

History
- Opened: 1891; June 1997 (West Chester Railroad)
- Closed: October 4, 1981
- Electrified: December 2, 1928

Services
Preceding station	West Chester Railroad	Following station
Cheyney toward West Chester	Main Line	Glen Mills Terminus
Former services
Preceding station	SEPTA	Following station
Cheyney toward West Chester	West Chester Line	Glen Mills toward Suburban Station
Preceding station	Pennsylvania Railroad	Following station
Cheyney toward West Chester	West Chester Line	Glen Mills toward Suburban Station
Location

Locksley station is a disused railroad station in Thornbury Township, Delaware County, Pennsylvania. It previously served the Pennsylvania Railroad (PRR) and later SEPTA Regional Rail's R3 West Chester Line. SEPTA closed the station in 1986. In 1997, this portion of the line was reopened by the West Chester Railroad heritage railway for weekend excursions; the company restored the Locksley station building.

== History ==
Pennsylvania Railroad established Locksley station on May 24, 1890, based on a petition from the residents of the locality. The name, according to a 1901 newspaper article, did not originate from the area, but was chosen by the superintendent of that division of the railroad from a volume of poems by Alfred, Lord Tennyson.

SEPTA later took over the station as part of the R3 West Chester Line. SEPTA discontinued regular passenger service in September 1986, due to deteriorating track conditions and Chester County's desire to expand facilities at Exton station on SEPTA's Paoli/Thorndale Line. Service was restored by the West Chester Railroad (WCRR) in 1997, a privately owned and operated heritage railway that operates between Glen Mills and West Chester on weekends. A PRR historic manual block position-light signal stands near the station site. Remains of the Dyer Stone Quarry and Thorndale Mills are also visible from the station.
