= West Chester University station =

Former railroad station in Pennsylvania, US

West Chester U
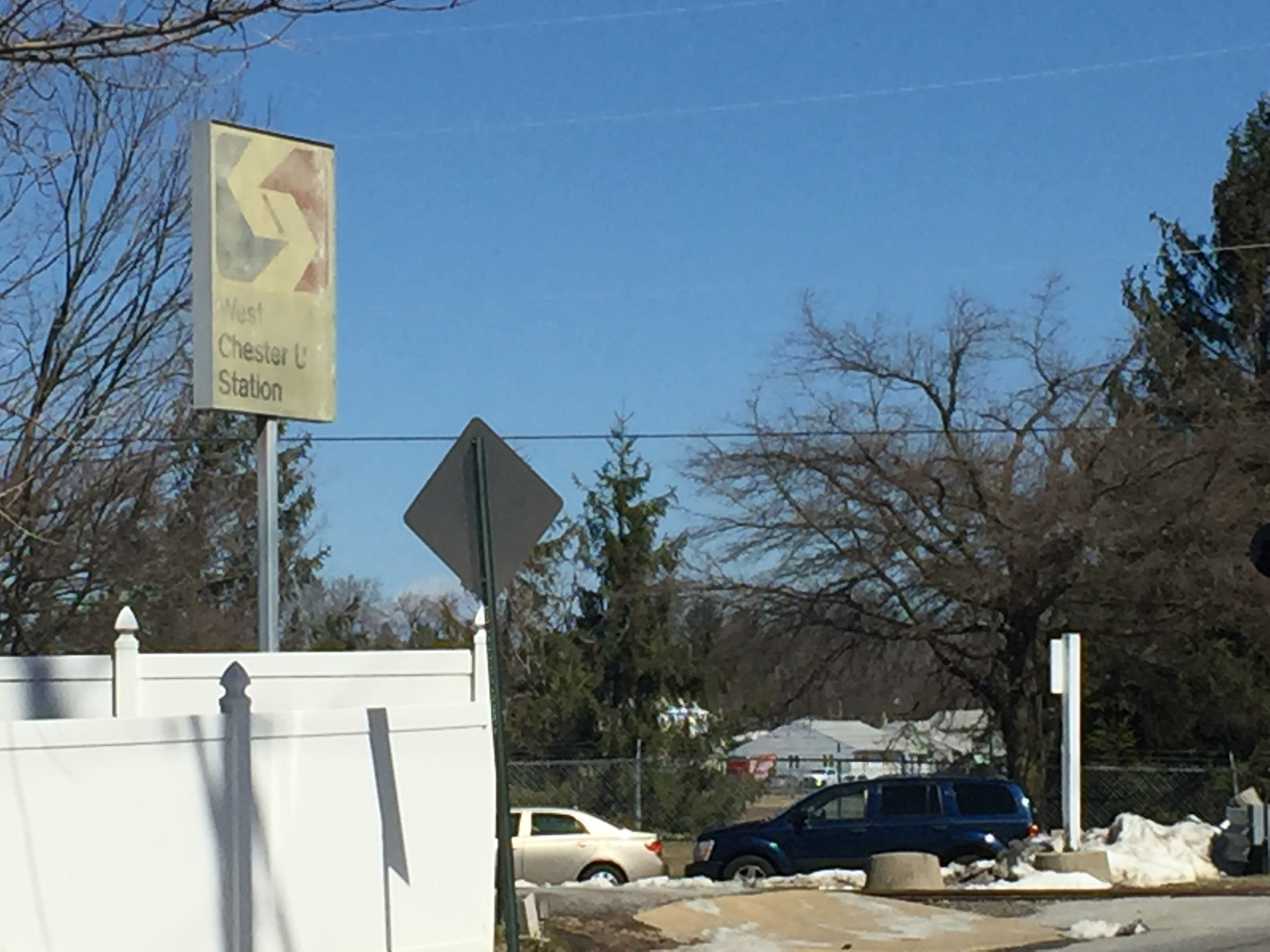
- The former West Chester University station sign in 2017.

General information
- Location: Nields Street; West Chester, Pennsylvania
- Coordinates: 39.9567°N 75.5934°W
- System: Former SEPTA Regional Rail station
- Owner: West Chester Railroad
- Lines: Pennsylvania Railroad, SEPTA R3 West Chester Line
- Platforms: 1 side platform
- Tracks: 1

Construction
- Structure type: metal shelter
- Platform levels: 1

History
- Opened: 1968
- Closed: September 19, 1986
- Electrified: December 2, 1928
- Former names: Nields Street
Former services
Preceding station	SEPTA	Following station
West Chester Terminus	West Chester Line	Westtown toward Suburban Station
Location

West Chester University station is a former railroad station in West Chester, Pennsylvania. It was a stop on the Pennsylvania Railroad's (PRR) West Chester Line, and later became a part of SEPTA Regional Rail's R3 West Chester line before being closed in 1986. The West Chester Railroad heritage railway leased the line, but does not use West Chester University station.

== History ==
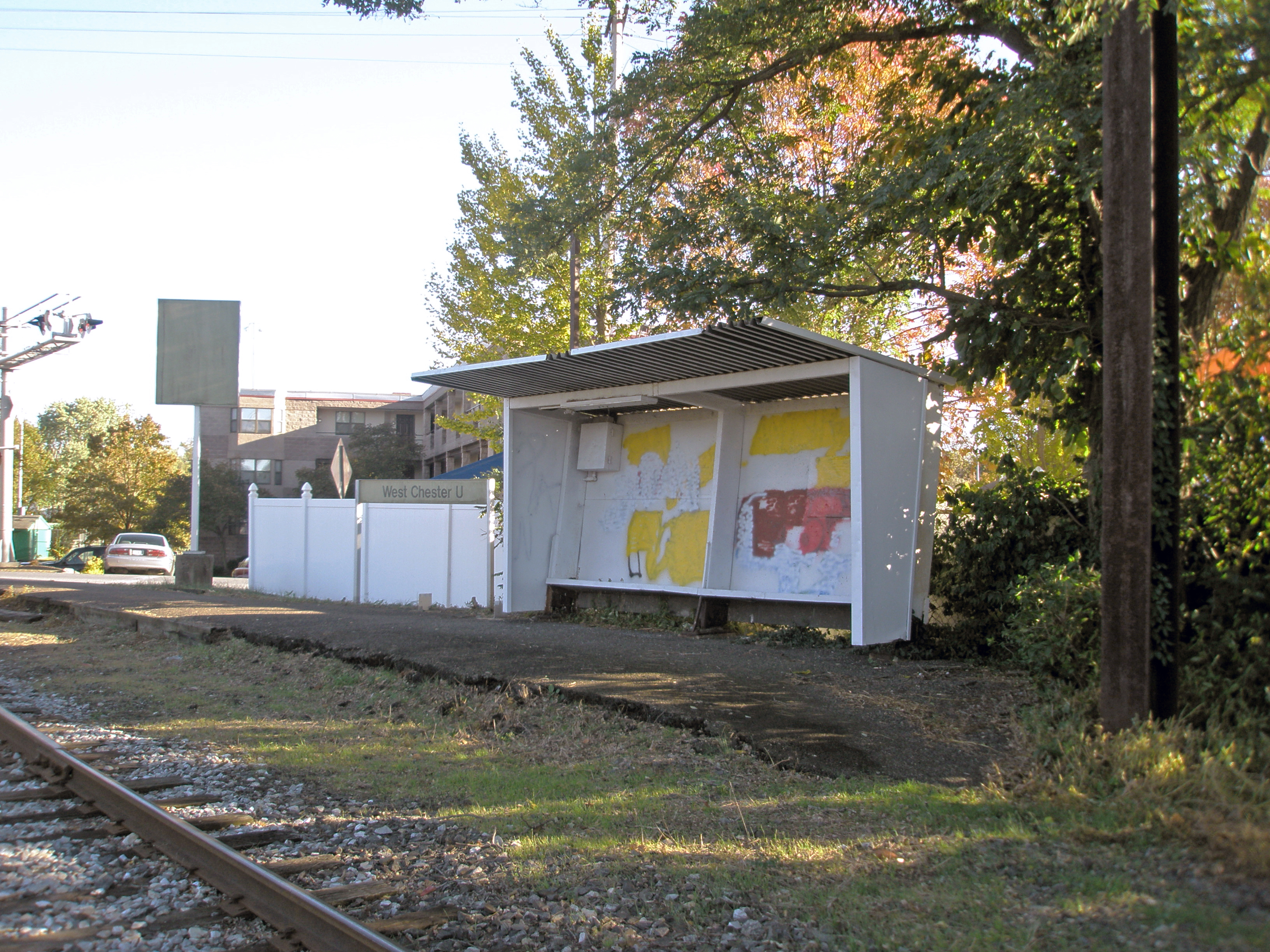
Station shelter

Students and professors at the State Normal School as well as local residents had pleaded with the PRR to construct a station at East Nields Street to avoid walking six blocks north to the Market Street station. The PRR refused to do so, though trains stopped at Nields Street occasionally after World War I. As late as 1962, residents were still urging the financially ailing PRR to build a station at Nields Street, and by 1965, the PRR offered to do so in exchange for permission to demolish the Market Street station. However, West Chester Borough Council opposed that plan in the hope that Market Street station would become a downtown transportation center. The Pennsylvania Public Utilities Commission allowed the PRR to vacate the dilapidated Market Street station. It was only after the station was demolished in 1968 that PRR's successor, Penn Central, constructed a small metal passenger shelter at the location, initially named Nields Street and later West Chester University station.

SEPTA later took over the station as part of SEPTA Regional Rail's R3 West Chester Line. SEPTA discontinued regular passenger service in September 1986, due to deteriorating track conditions and Chester County's desire to expand facilities at Exton station on the Paoli/Thorndale Line. In 1997, the West Chester Railroad (WCRR), a privately owned and operated heritage railway, restored the line between Glen Mills and West Chester for weekend recreational use. It does not use the West Chester University station. The shelter remains in derelict condition. Though it has not been regularly maintained since its 1986 closure, WCRR volunteers paint the station site on occasion. SEPTA signage also survives.
