= Glen Mills station =

Railway station in Glen Mills, Pennsylvania

Glen Mills
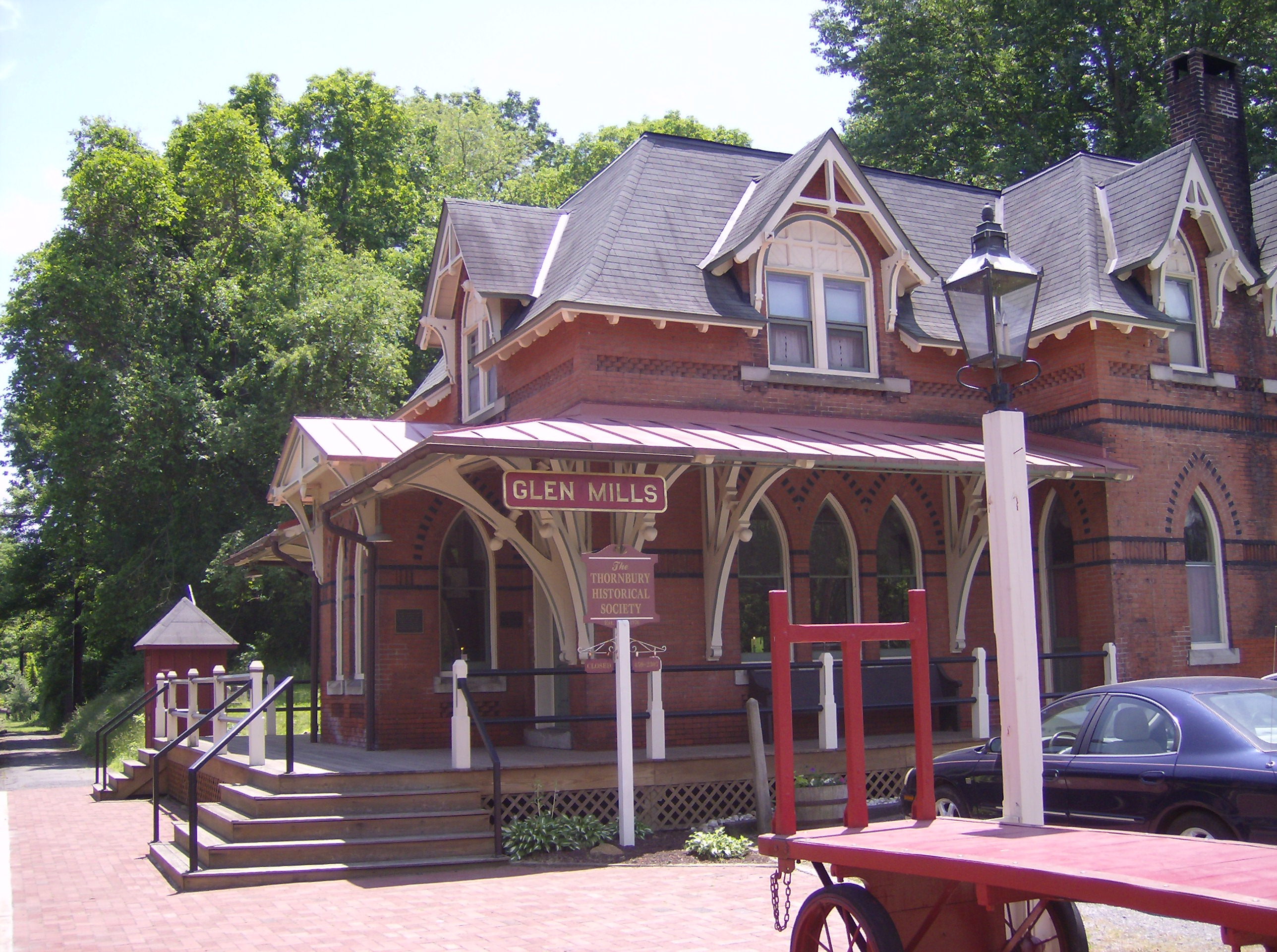
- Restored Glen Mills station

General information
- Location: 130 Glen Mills Road; Glen Mills, Pennsylvania
- Coordinates: 39.9199°N 75.4904°W
- System: West Chester Railroad tourist train station
- Owner: West Chester Railroad
- Lines: Pennsylvania Railroad, SEPTA R3 West Chester Line
- Platforms: 1 side platform
- Tracks: 1

Construction
- Structure type: Queen Anne gothic

History
- Opened: August 31, 1858 (West Chester and Philadelphia Railroad); June 1997 (West Chester Railroad)
- Closed: September 19, 1986
- Rebuilt: 1991
- Electrified: December 2, 1928

Services
Preceding station	West Chester Railroad	Following station
Locksley toward West Chester	Main Line	Terminus
Former services
Preceding station	SEPTA	Following station
Cheyney toward West Chester	West Chester Line	Wawa Station toward Suburban Station
Locksley (closed 1981) toward West Chester	West Chester Line	Darlington (closed 1981) toward Suburban Station
Preceding station	Pennsylvania Railroad	Following station
Locksley toward West Chester	West Chester Line	Darlington toward Suburban Station
Location

Glen Mills station is a railroad station in Glen Mills, Pennsylvania currently used by the West Chester Railroad heritage railway. It is located at 130 Glen Mills Road, and owned by the Thornbury Historical Society.

== History ==
The site was a stop on the West Chester and Philadelphia Railroad beginning in 1858. The original station was located across the track where the Glen Mills Store now stands. In 1880, the railroad became the Pennsylvania Railroad's West Chester Branch. The current station was built in 1882, and is believed to have been designed by Frank Furness. It later became a part of SEPTA's West Chester line. SEPTA discontinued regular passenger service in September 1986, due to deteriorating track conditions and Chester County's desire to expand facilities at the nearby Exton station on the Paoli/Thorndale Line.

In 1997, the station was reopened by the West Chester Railroad, a privately owned and operated heritage railway running between Glen Mills and West Chester on weekends. However, due to what their website calls "hazardous and limited parking", the West Chester Railroad does not pick up passengers at Glen Mills. Instead, it serves as a 20-minute layover spot, where passengers can explore the station and picnic grove, and use bathrooms.
