= Media/Wawa Line =

SEPTA Regional Rail service

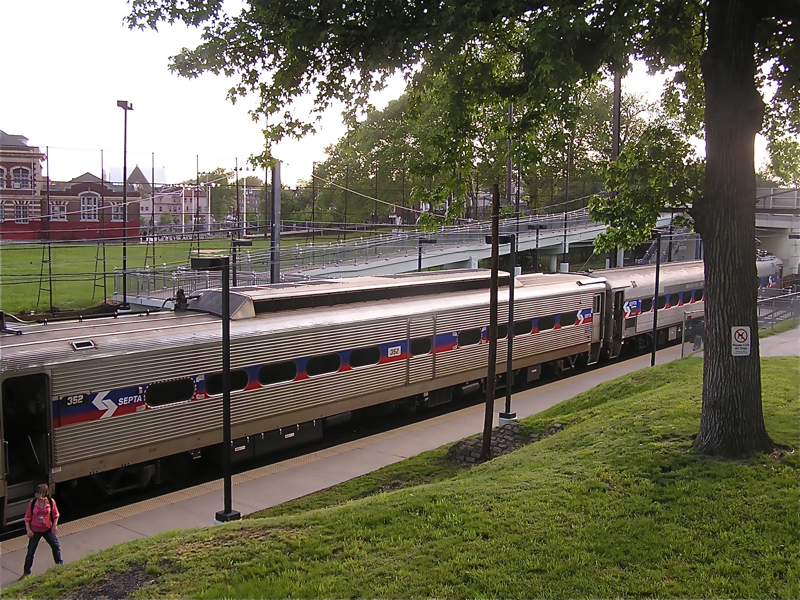
- SEPTA Regional Rail train at 49th Street station on what was then the Media/Elwyn Line in 2011

Overview
- Service type: SEPTA Regional Rail commuter rail service
- Current operator: SEPTA
- Former operators: Conrail; Pennsylvania Railroad
- Daily ridership: 6,271 (FY 2025)
- Annual ridership: 1,828,171 (FY 2025)

Route
- Termini: Temple University; Wawa
- Stops: 20
- Lines used: SEPTA Main Line; West Chester Branch

Technical
- Rolling stock: Electric multiple units, push-pull trains
- Electrification: Overhead line, 12 kV 25 Hz AC

The Media/Wawa Line is a SEPTA Regional Rail service that runs from Center City Philadelphia west to Wawa in Delaware County. It uses the West Chester Branch, which connects with the SEPTA Main Line at 30th Street Station. Under the Pennsylvania Railroad, service continued to West Chester, Pennsylvania. On September 19, 1986, service was truncated to Elwyn.

On August 21, 2022, service was restored to Wawa Station, 3 miles (4.8 km) west of the Elwyn station. As of 2022, most inbound Media/Wawa Line trains continue onto the Manayunk/Norristown and Fox Chase lines.

== Route ==
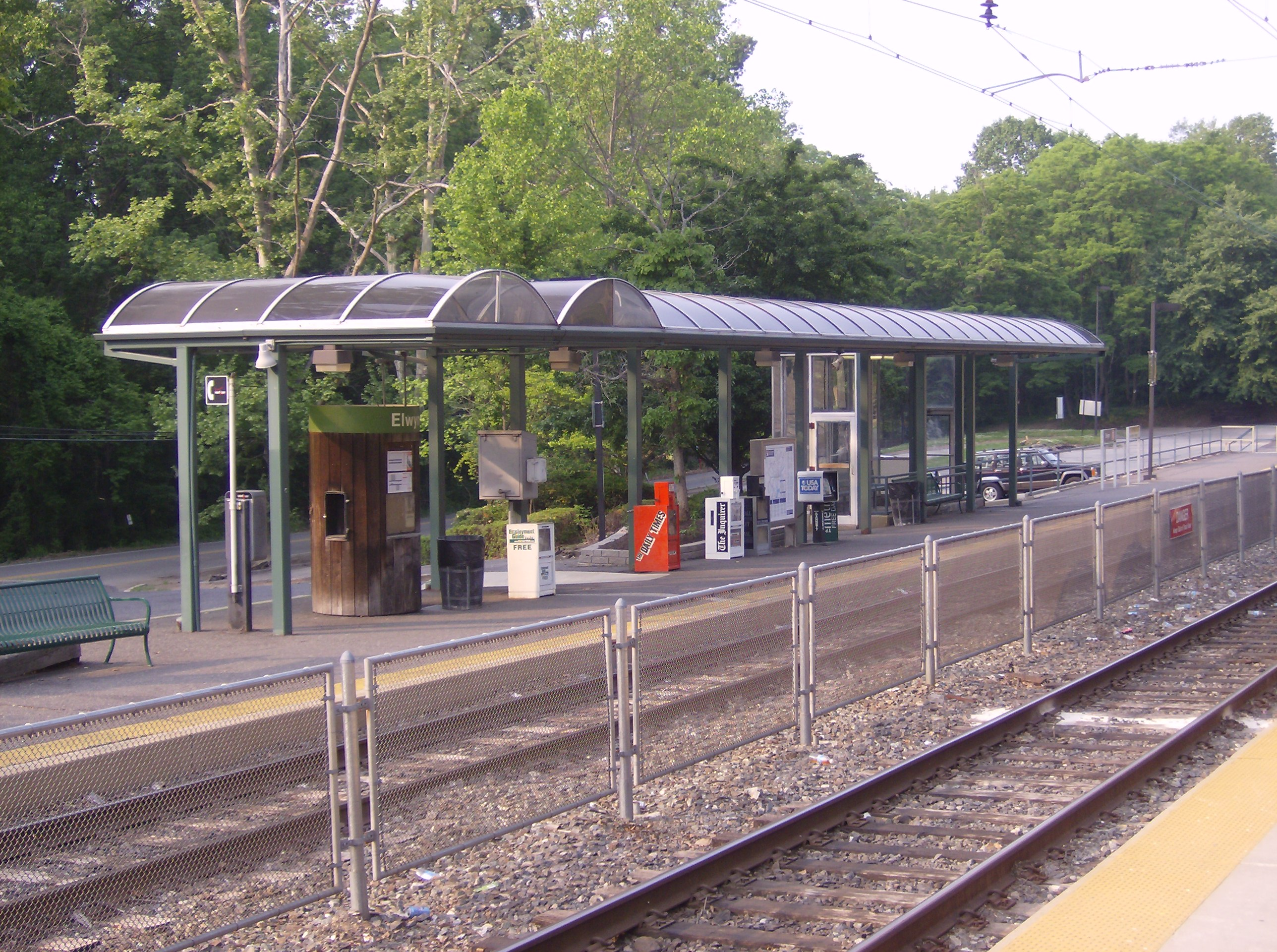
Elwyn, terminus of the line from 1986 to 2022

Media/Wawa Line trains use the West Chester Branch, a former Pennsylvania Railroad line, which diverges from the SEPTA Main Line at 30th Street Station. At Arsenal Interlocking, just south of Penn Medicine Station, there is a junction with Amtrak's Northeast Corridor where Airport and Wilmington/Newark trains diverge. The West Chester branch turns west, curves around the Woodlands Cemetery, and heads west towards Elwyn. From University City to Fernwood–Yeadon, the line is grade-separated; immediately west of Fernwood/Yeadon station, the abandoned Newtown Square Branch diverges north.

The line has four high steel trestle river valley crossings, built between 1891 and 1896 to replace earlier structures. From west to east, the first of these is over Ridley Creek between Elwyn and Media, and is 641 feet (195 m) long and 103 feet (31 m) high. The second, over Crum Creek between Wallingford and Swarthmore, is the longest of the four, and measures 915 feet (279 m) long and 97 feet (30 m) tall. The third, 274 feet (84 m) long, crosses Darby Creek immediately west of Gladstone. The last, 377 feet (115 m) long, crosses Cobbs Creek between Fernwood–Yeadon and Angora at a height of 56 feet (17 m). The Crum Creek Viaduct, which required extensive rebuilding and complete repainting (with a lengthy shutdown of service beyond Swarthmore) by SEPTA in 1983 after decades of deferred maintenance, was completely replaced in 2016. The other three trestles, received attention similar to Crum Creek in the 1980s, have undergone comprehensive structural and substructural renewal.

The line is double-tracked from Arsenal Interlocking to Elwyn and single-tracked beyond, with passing sidings at or near Glen Riddle, Lenni, Glen Mills, Cheyney, Westtown and West Chester. The sidings once allowed multiple commuter trains to operate on the single-track section. Passing sidings were marked by the PRR's trademark bowtie catenary poles, while single-track areas used single-pole catenary supports. After regular service ended beyond Elwyn in 1986, vandals gradually stole the copper catenary wire, prompting SEPTA to remove the rest in summer 2005. SEPTA has been aggressively replacing its older catenary equipment; it replaced the remaining 1928 catenary from University City to Lenni between 2014 and 2017.

== History ==
The line was originally built by the West Chester and Philadelphia Railroad (WC&P), which opened the Philadelphia-to-Burmont section on November 15, 1853. The WC&P extended service to Media on October 19, 1854, and to West Chester on November 11, 1858.

In the early 1880s, the Pennsylvania Railroad gained control of the line, which it renamed its West Chester Branch. One early station, Pennellton, located along a passing siding between the stations of Darlington and Wawa, was removed from service by 1911. Electrified service along the line began on December 2, 1928.

The line passed to Penn Central in 1968 and was later absorbed into Conrail in 1976.

=== 1979 collision ===
On October 16, 1979, at 8:19 a.m., an inbound commuter train collided with two others plus cars from a fourth train between Angora and 49th Street stations. The accident killed one person and injured 525 others.

Earlier, Train #712, a nine-car train of former PRR MP54E6 cars, had left behind the rear two cars (a coupler between the seventh and eighth car had broken), then continued on to Suburban Station. Train #716, consisting of nine ex-Reading "Blueliner" heavyweight cars, was detailed to push the empty defective cars out of the way, and slowed to a stop in order to couple with them. Train #0714, two Silverliner IVs, then stopped short of #716, in accordance with signal rules.

The next train, #1718, a four-car consist of three Silverliner IIs and one Silverliner III, neither stopped at the nearest signal nor slowed adequately at the previous signal, nor did the engineer apply the air brake correctly once the rear of #0714 was seen around a curve. Traveling at an estimated 28 mph, #1718 rear-ended #0714, shoving it forward to collide in succession with all the other stopped equipment. Both cars of #0714 derailed, as did some of the other cars.

A total of 525 passengers were injured, including a conductor who died a few days later from his injuries. Many cars were damaged, including the lead car of #1718 (Silverliner II #265) which was later written off and scrapped. In addition to speed and signal rules violations, other causative factors in the accident cited by the National Transportation Safety Board included: inoperative onboard radios in the Silverliners, and no radios at all in the heavyweight MUs; an inoperative speedometer on Train 1718; improper operation of the air brake (a full-service brake application rather than an emergency "dumping the air" application) by #1718's engineer once he realized a collision was imminent; and the possible distraction caused by the presence of three other employees in #1718's operating cab. Also, the branch's 50-year-old automatic block signal system was criticized as being inadequate in such a situation; although it worked correctly, the system was not equipped to display cab signal indications or stop the train in event of a speed violation, nor could it allow trains to operate against the current of traffic on either track.

SEPTA subsequently resignaled the line to all of these standards using color light wayside signals, first between Arsenal and Secane interlockings in the late 1980s, and then from Secane to Elwyn in the mid-1990s during restoration of double track between Media and Elwyn.

=== SEPTA era ===
R3 signage before truncation

Signage used by SEPTA for R3 service until July 25, 2010

SEPTA took over operations in 1983, running commuter service on the line to West Chester. Beginning in 1984 the route was designated R3 West Chester and R3 Elwyn as part of SEPTA's diametrical reorganization of its lines. Shuttles operated between West Chester and Elwyn; Elwyn trains operated through the city center to North Broad station but did not continue on to the ex-Reading side of the system. Plans had called for the line to be paired with the Chestnut Hill West Line but this depended on a never-built connection from the Chestnut Hill West Line to the ex-Reading near Wayne Junction. In later years the line was paired with the West Trenton Line. The R-number naming system was dropped on July 25, 2010, and the service became known as the Media/Elwyn Line. As of 2022, most weekday trains terminate at Temple University or continue to Elm Street in Norristown on the Manayunk/Norristown Line, while most weekend trains continue to Fox Chase on the Fox Chase Line.

On September 19, 1986, SEPTA ended service west of Elwyn. Ridership on that segment had dwindled, a process accelerated by bustitution used while the deteriorating tracks were closed for repair. In addition, Chester County officials preferred to expand Exton station on SEPTA's Paoli/Thorndale Line. SEPTA only had funds for one of the two projects, so service to West Chester was terminated. SEPTA did not officially place the line out of service until late 1991. At the time, Delaware County officials were pushing to restore service at least as far as Wawa, but Chester County officials were unenthusiastic and SEPTA General Manager Louis Gambaccini said service restoration between Wawa and West Chester was "not cost-effective." Nonetheless, SEPTA studied the possibility of restoring service on the 3 miles from Elwyn to Wawa later in the decade.

SEPTA activated positive train control on the Media/Elwyn Line on September 26, 2016.

SEPTA is undertaking the Southwest Connection Improvement Program to rebuild the section of the Media/Elwyn Line between 30th Street Station and Arsenal Interlocking; this section also carries trains from the Airport Line and Wilmington/Newark Line. The Southwest Connection Improvement Program involves replacing Arsenal Interlocking, removing Walnut Interlocking and realigning rail, constructing a new interlocking and turn back track near Penn Medicine Station, replacing the catenary system, repairing and upgrading the Walnut Street Tunnel, and repairing drainage structures. During construction periods, service has been modified along the Airport, Media/Elwyn, and Wilmington/Newark lines.

==== Elwyn–Wawa restoration ====
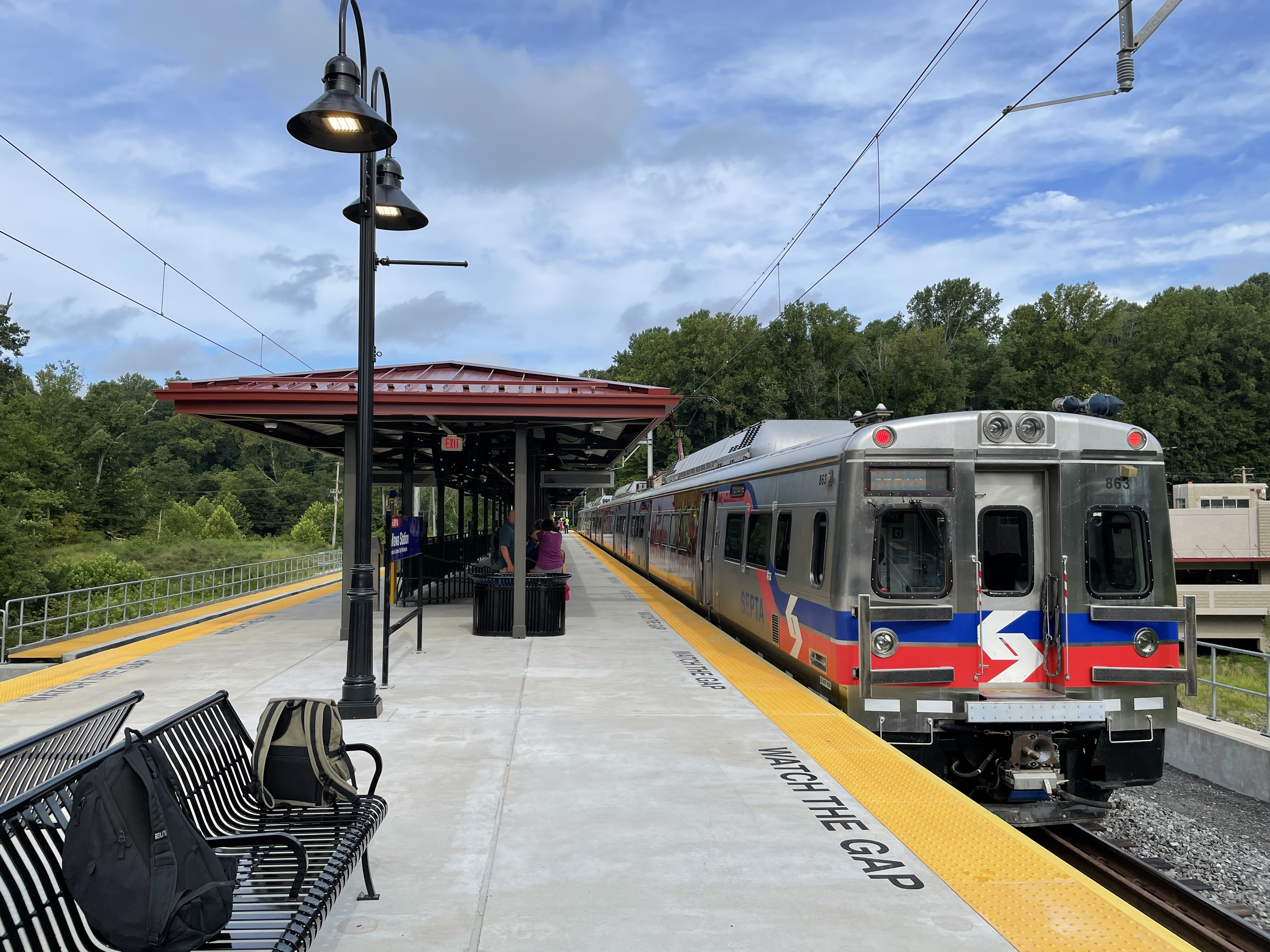
Wawa Station in August 2022

In June 2005, SEPTA hired URS Corporation for design and engineering services for a project to restore rail service between Elwyn station and Wawa Station. The engineering design phase began the following month, and includes preliminary engineering, environmental impact analysis, and final engineering. Shortfalls in funding delayed completion of the phase to 2010, and construction was expected to take 24 to 36 months to complete. As of November 2016, the project's completion date slipped to the Summer of 2020. As of August 2018, the completion date was further delayed to the end of 2021. As of January 2022, service to Wawa was expected to resume in July 2022. On May 23, 2022, it was announced that the start of passenger service to Wawa would be delayed until August 21, 2022.

The project included new track, catenary, signals, and communications equipment; and new structures, including a new station at Wawa with a large park and ride facility. SEPTA initially estimated that the cost would be $51.327 million, but in SEPTA's 2014 Capital Budget, the estimate had risen to $91.387 million. The extension of service to Wawa was expected to reduce traffic congestion through Middletown Township. A new train storage yard at Lenni was also constructed.

Wawa Station is ADA-compliant with high platforms, a ticket office, ticket vending machines, and a waiting room, as well as a 600-car parking garage. The station is expected to see 500 commuters on a typical weekday, as it will sit next to US Route 1 and serve the nearby corporate headquarters of convenience store chain Wawa. Bus service will connect the station to Painters Crossing and Concordville, Pennsylvania.

On July 27, 2022, SEPTA announced that Wawa had acquired naming rights to Wawa Station for $5.4 million in a 10-year deal. Once Wawa Station opened, the Media/Elwyn Line was renamed to the Media/Wawa Line.

The Delaware County Planning Department is working with SEPTA and Friends of the Chester Creek Branch to build a hiking trail within SEPTA's right-of-way from the new Wawa Station to Lenni Road. This will be the northern end of the Chester Creek Trail.

In July 2022, SEPTA began restoration of track between the former Darlington and Glen Mills stations, in anticipation of future freight rail service to the nearby quarry and the possibility of the West Chester Railroad running future excursions past Glen Mills Station.

Wawa Station opened for service on August 21, 2022.

==== Proposed restoration of service to West Chester ====
West Chester and Chester County officials have been pushing SEPTA to restore service to West Chester since 2011. The request would give commuters an alternative to driving to the Paoli/Thorndale Line stations in Exton or Paoli, and reduce congestion on U.S. Route 202 between U.S. Route 1 and West Chester.

Since 1997, the heritage railway West Chester Railroad has operated on the tracks between Glen Mills and West Chester, where SEPTA no longer runs trains; this is the only such operation on a SEPTA-owned line. Amtrak maintenance trains formerly collected track ballast from a quarry near Glen Mills station.

In 2014, the borough council of West Chester voted to establish a group known as the committee to Reestablish Rail Service to West Chester. Shortly thereafter, SEPTA official Byron Comati argued that West Chester lacks ridership demand needed to support expansion of the Media/Elwyn Line, in part due to competition from the Paoli/Thorndale Line. Additionally, according to Comati, the "circuitous alignment" of the Media/Elwyn Line would mean that a trip from West Chester into Philadelphia would take two hours, whereas the Paoli line offers a 45-minute trip from the Exton station. SEPTA timetables from 1986 show local trains making all stops from West Chester to 30th Street Station with scheduled travel times ranging between 59 minutes and 69 minutes, far less time than the two hours suggested by current SEPTA officials.

In March 2018, SEPTA completed the West Chester Line Restoration Feasibility Study, which showed that a restoration of train service to West Chester would improve connectivity, provide a commuter alternative, increase transit ridership, encourage economic development, and not have negative environmental effects.

In 2022, the borough council of West Chester voted to seek funding for a plan called the Metro Concept that would establish train service using battery-operated cars between West Chester and Wawa, where riders would transfer to regular SEPTA trains to Philadelphia. The proposed extension would have two stops in West Chester, a stop in Westtown Township, and a stop near Cheyney University. The extension would cost $16.4 million and is planned as a two-year pilot project to show the service can attract riders.

As of 2025, plans for this new service, called the West Chester Metro, call for a six-station service between Wawa and West Chester, with stops in Glen Mills, Cheyney University, Westtown and the West Chester University. This service would use the Railroad Development Corporation's Pop-Up Metro technology, including Class 230 battery electric multiple units.

== Station list ==
Unused or demolished stations are in gray.

| Zone | Location | Station | Miles (km) from Center City | Opened | Closed | Connections / notes |
|---|---|---|---|---|---|---|
| C | University City, Philadelphia | Penn Medicine Station | 1.8 (2.9) | | | SEPTA Regional Rail: SEPTA City Bus: 40, LUCY |
| 1 | Kingsessing, Philadelphia | 49th Street | 3.3 (5.3) | | | SEPTA Metro: SEPTA City Bus: 64 |
| 1 | Angora, Philadelphia | Angora | 4.5 (7.2) | | | SEPTA Metro: SEPTA City Bus: 46, 63 |
| 2 | Yeadon | Fernwood–Yeadon | 5.5 (8.9) | | | SEPTA City Bus: 68; SEPTA Suburban Bus: 108 |
| 2 | Lansdowne | Lansdowne | 6.3 (10.1) | | | SEPTA Suburban Bus: 109, 113, 115 |
| 2 | Lansdowne | Gladstone | 7.0 (11.3) | November 15, 1853 | | |
| 2 | Clifton Heights | Clifton–Aldan | 7.6 (12.2) | | | SEPTA Metro: |
| 2 | Primos | Primos | 8.2 (13.2) | | | SEPTA Suburban Bus: 107 |
| 2 | Secane | Secane | 8.9 (14.3) | | | |
| 2 | Morton | Morton | 10.0 (16.1) | | | SEPTA Suburban Bus: 107 |
| 3 (Note: Williamson School, Glen Riddle, Lenni, and the former Wawa station were in fare zone 4) | Swarthmore | Swarthmore | 11.4 (18.3) | | | SEPTA Suburban Bus: 109 |
| 3 | Wallingford | Wallingford | 12.4 (20.0) | | | |
| 3 | Nether Providence Township | Moylan–Rose Valley | 13.3 (21.4) | | | |
| 3 | Media | Media | 14.0 (22.5) | October 19, 1854 | | |
| 3 | Media | Elwyn | 15.1 (24.3) | | | SEPTA Suburban Bus: 117 |
| 3 | Media | Williamson School | 15.9 (25.6) | | September 19, 1986 | |
| 3 | Media | Glen Riddle | 16.7 (26.9) | February 1, 1856 | September 19, 1986 | |
| 3 | Middletown Township | Lenni | 17.4 (28.0) | September 22, 1856 | September 19, 1986 | |
| 3 | Chester Heights | Wawa Station | 18.1 (29.1) | April 13, 1857 August 21, 2022 | September 19, 1986 | SEPTA Suburban Bus: 111, 114 |
| 4 | Chester Heights | Darlington | 18.7 (30.1) | | October 4, 1981 | |
| 4 | Glen Mills | Glen Mills | 20.3 (32.7) | August 31, 1858 | September 19, 1986 | |
| 4 | Thornbury Township | Locksley | 21.6 (34.8) | | October 4, 1981 | |
| 4 | Thornbury Township | Cheyney | 22.2 (35.7) | October 23, 1858 | September 19, 1986 | |
| 5 | Thornbury Township | Westtown | 23.9 (38.5) | October 23, 1858 | September 19, 1986 | |
| 5 | Westtown Township | Oakbourne | 25.5 (41.0) | 1859 | 1961 | |
| 5 | West Chester | West Chester University | 27.1 (43.6) | | September 19, 1986 | |
| 5 | West Chester | West Chester | 27.5 (44.3) | November 11, 1856 | September 19, 1986 | |

== Ridership ==
Between FY 2013–FY 2019 yearly ridership on the Media/Wawa Line ranged from 2.9 to 3.1 million before collapsing during the COVID-19 pandemic. (Note: Data for individual lines is not available for FY 2020.)
