= Oakbourne station =

Oakbourne
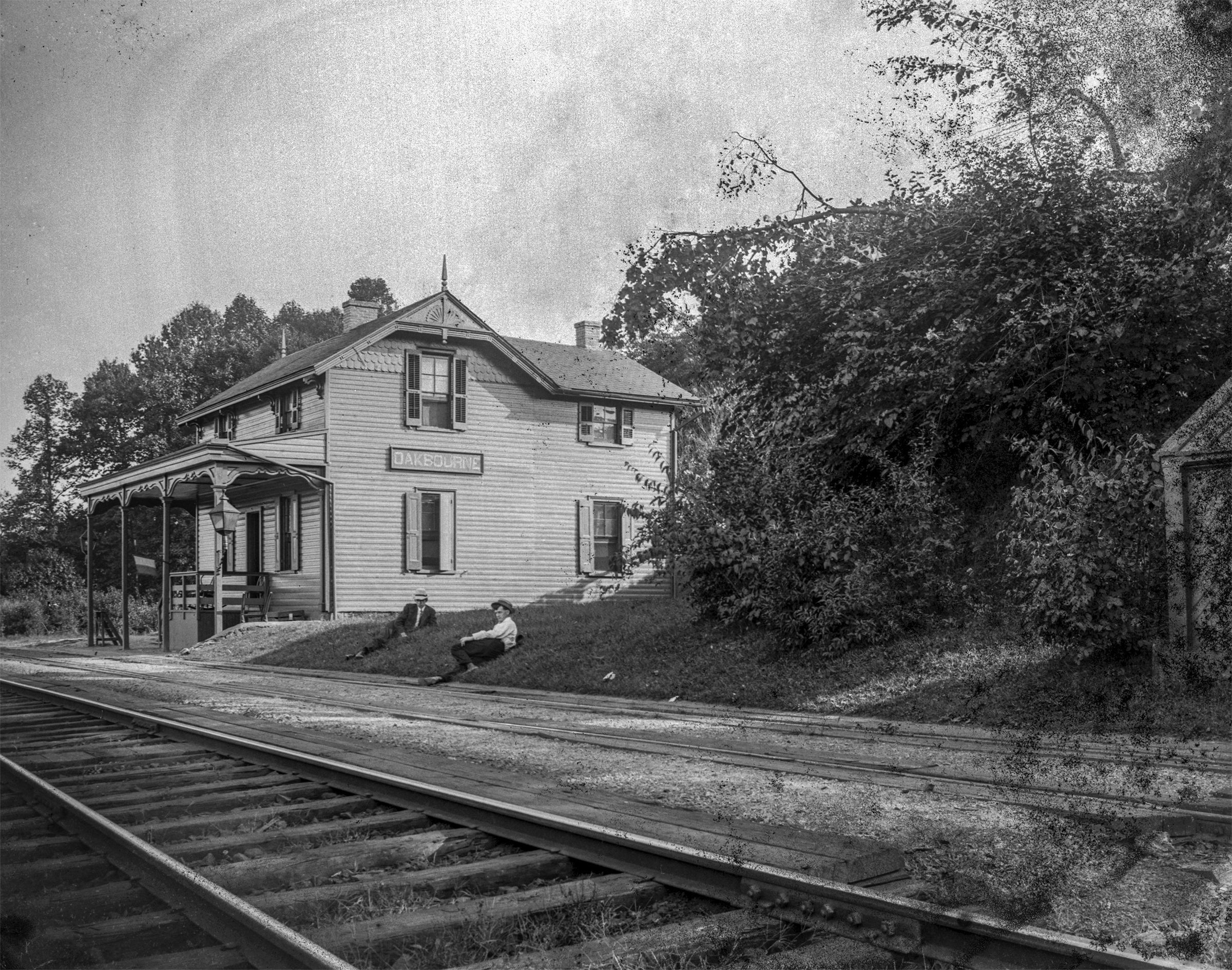
- Oakbourne station, c. 1907.

General information
- Location: Oakbourne Road; Westtown Township, Pennsylvania
- Coordinates: 39.9420°N 75.5722°W
- System: Former Pennsylvania Railroad station
- Owner: West Chester Railroad
- Line: West Chester Branch
- Platforms: 1 side platform
- Tracks: 1

Construction
- Platform levels: 1

History
- Opened: 1859
- Closed: 1961
- Rebuilt: September 1871
- Electrified: December 2, 1928
- Former names: Lecompton (1859–c. 1863); Hemphill (c. 1863–March 24, 1885)

Former services
| Preceding station | Pennsylvania Railroad | Following station |
|---|---|---|
| West Chester Terminus | West Chester Line | Westtown toward Suburban Station |
Location

Oakbourne station is a defunct railroad station on Oakbourne Road in Westtown Township, Pennsylvania. Established by the Pennsylvania Railroad, it closed in 1961 and was subsequently demolished. SEPTA Regional Rail later used the line for R3 West Chester Line, but did not use the Oakbourne stop.

== History ==
Oakbourne station was initially called Lecompton station, and later Hemphill station after a neighboring landowner, but was changed to Oakbourne when a post office was established in 1883, with Ellen Jane Speakman serving as postmistress. During the American Civil War, the station was used as a marshaling point for the neighboring Camp Elder, which housed Union prisoners captured by the Confederacy and unofficially paroled during the Battle of Gettysburg in 1863.

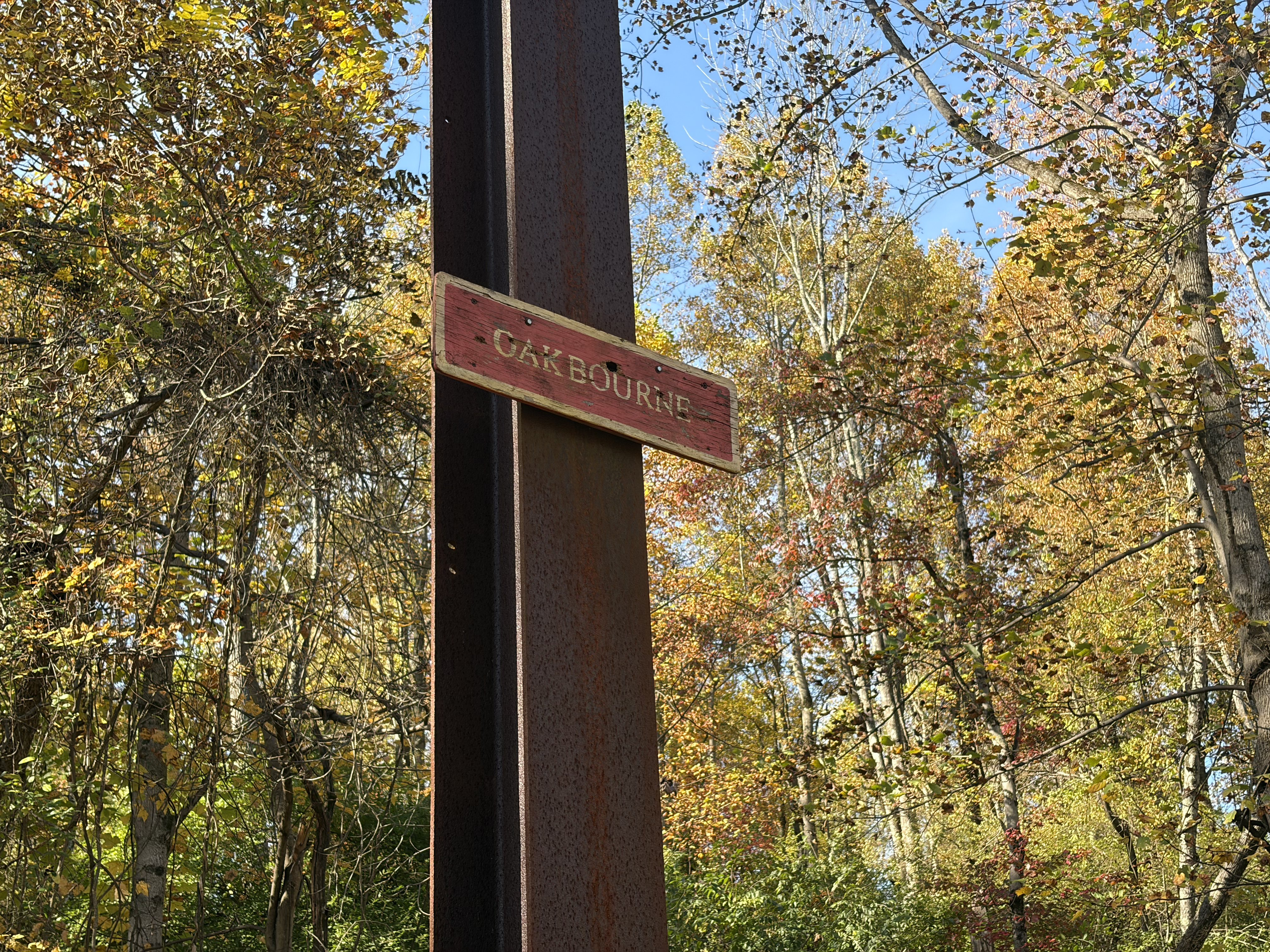
A sign left by the members of the West Chester Railroad to commemorate the torn down Oakbourne station. The sign is on a catenary pole near the former station site.

A post office was located in the station building until it closed on December 10, 1928, when Ellen Speakman retired. A small single-track siding served as a freight yard for the Oakbourne Epileptic Hospital and Colony Farm and other local industries. Service to the station was terminated in 1961, and the building was razed several years later. Later in the station's honor, the West Chester Railroad has affixed a small “Oakbourne” station sign to a nearby catenary pole in the style of those made by the Pennsylvania Railroad.

SEPTA subsequently took over the Pennsylvania Railroad route for SEPTA Regional Rail's R3 West Chester Line. However, it did not reopen the Oakbourne stop. SEPTA discontinued regular passenger service to the line in September 1986, due to deteriorating track conditions and Chester County's desire to expand facilities at Exton station on the Paoli/Thorndale Line. The West Chester Railroad heritage railway restored the line for weekend excursions in June 1997, but does not use Oakbourne station.
