= West Chester Branch =

Railway line in Pennsylvania

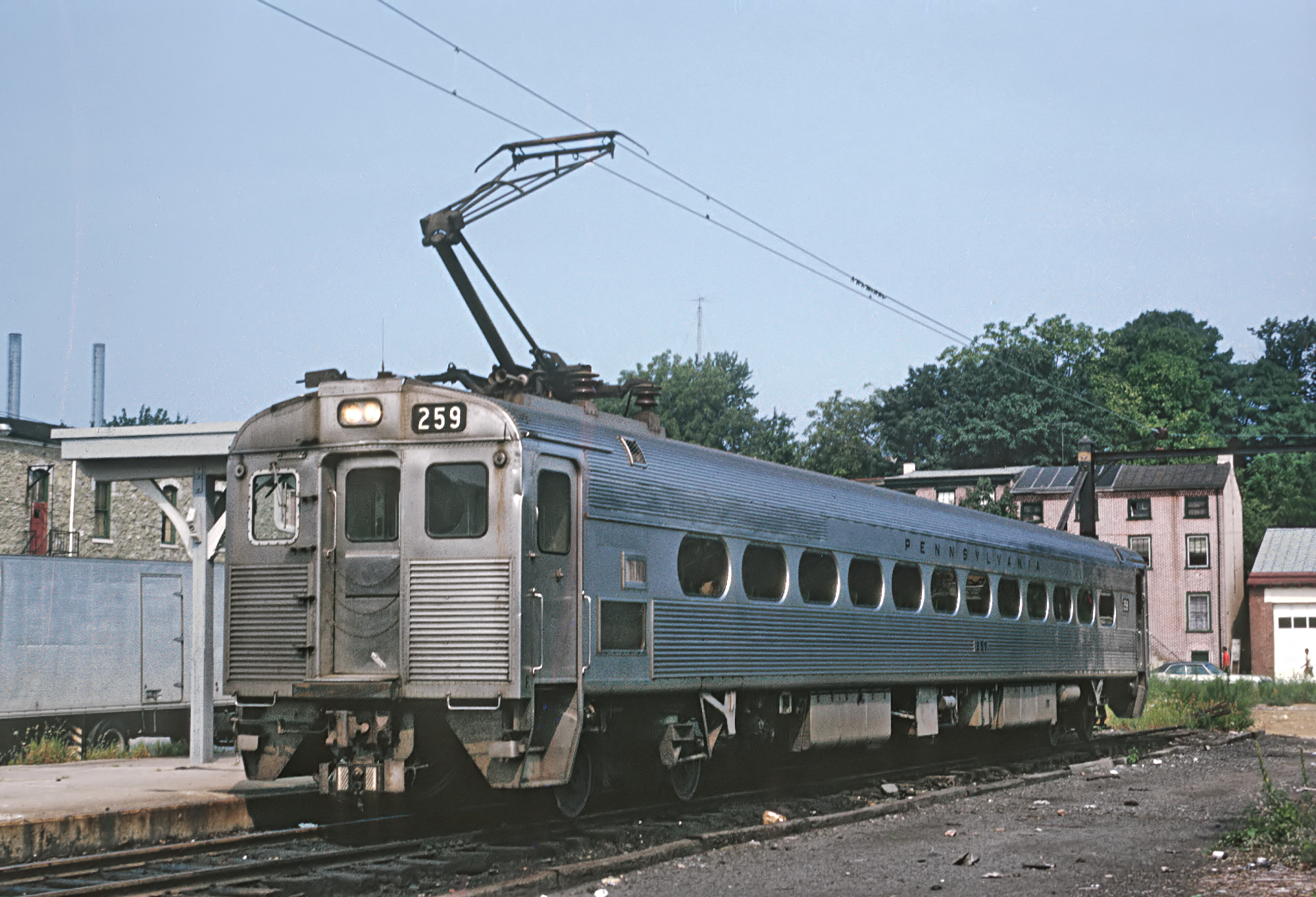
- Penn Central Silverliner (in Pennsylvania Railroad livery) at West Chester in 1970

Overview
- Termini: 30th Street Station; Wawa Station

Service
- Services: Media/Wawa Line

Technical
- Track gauge: 1,435 mm (4 ft 8 1/2 in) standard gauge

The West Chester Branch is a railway line in southeastern Pennsylvania. At its fullest extent, it connected with the Philadelphia–Washington Main Line (Northeast Corridor) at Arsenal Junction near the University of Pennsylvania and the Philadelphia-Chicago Main Line near Frazer, Pennsylvania. It was part of the Pennsylvania Railroad (PRR) system (and later Penn Central) until the formation of Conrail in 1976. Today, SEPTA operates the Media/Wawa Line commuter service west to Wawa Station, while the West Chester Railroad heritage railway operates between West Chester station and Glen Mills.

== History ==
The branch was composed of rail lines built by two companies in the 19th century.

One portion, a 9-mile (14 km) line from West Chester to Malvern, was built after 1831 by the West Chester Railroad. The PRR leased the line in 1859, and moved the Malvern end to a junction at Frazer in 1880. The PRR acquired the West Chester Railroad in 1903.

The other portion, a 26-mile (42 km) line from Philadelphia to West Chester, was built by the West Chester and Philadelphia Railroad (WC&P) between 1852 and 1858. In 1880, the WC&P was purchased by the PRR-controlled Philadelphia, Wilmington and Baltimore Railroad (PWB), which merged it the following year into the Philadelphia and Baltimore Central Railroad.

As the PRR's West Chester Branch, the line offered commuter rail service between Philadelphia, Media, and West Chester, the county seat of Chester County. In the 1920s, the PRR electrified the Paoli and Chestnut Hill lines, then its Philadelphia-Washington Main Line to Wilmington and the West Chester Branch out to West Chester.

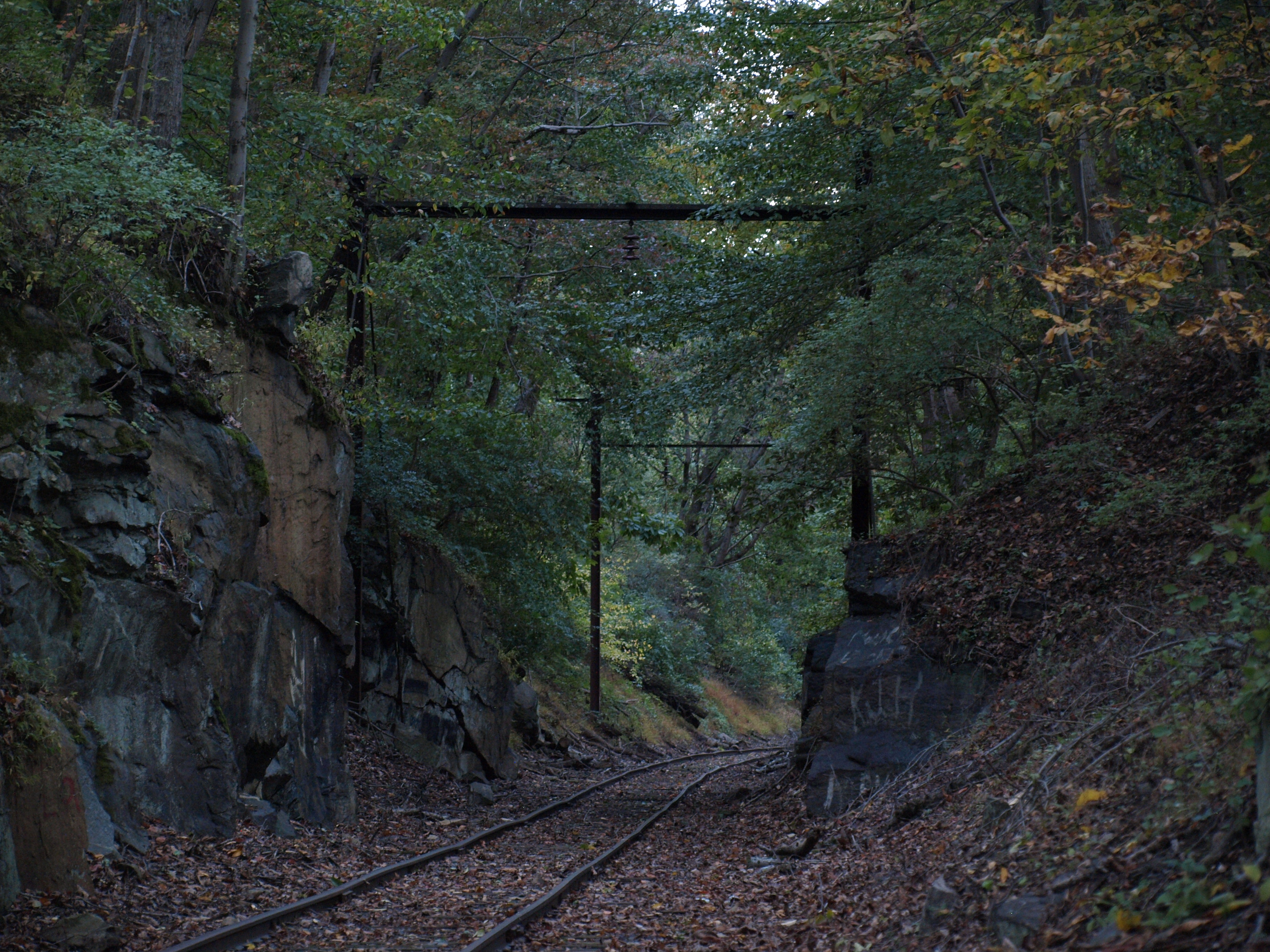
This is a catenary pole in the Oakbourne area of the West Chester Branch. This pole was likely added when the PRR electrified the line in 1928. Its located just southeast of where the Oakbourne station used to stand

The PRR ended passenger service from West Chester to Frazer in 1932 and removed those tracks in the early 1960s. In 1971 and 1972, there were washouts on the nearby Chester Creek Branch and Octoraro Branch, due to heavy storms and Hurricane Agnes. Subsequently, the Penn Central (PC) ended service north of West Chester and parts of the nearby branches and removed some of the tracks.

Today, the right-of-way can still be seen in places.

== Later years ==
The branch passed to Conrail in 1976, following the Penn Central's bankruptcy. SEPTA acquired it in 1979; Conrail continued to run commuter services under contract until 1983, when SEPTA took full control. SEPTA operated the line as its R3-Media/West Chester service until 1986, when service was truncated to Elwyn. Eighteen West Chester-Center City trains had operated on weekdays along with eleven West Chester-Media shuttle trains. SEPTA restored rail service west of Elwyn to a new park and ride station in Wawa in 2022.

As of 2022, SEPTA operates commuter rail operations on the line between Philadelphia and Wawa, while the West Chester Railroad operates a scenic excursion train on weekends between West Chester and Glen Mills. Occasional nocturnal freight service occurs via Amtrak to obtain track ballast from a quarry in Glen Mills.

== Restoration of service study ==
In 2018 the Pennsylvania Department of Transportation commissioned a feasibility study for rebuilding the line and restoring direct commuter rail service from West Chester to Philadelphia 30th Street Station. SEPTA service below the Elwyn station was terminated in 1986 due to low ridership and unsafe track conditions, but the area has since grown in population and has few transportation alternatives. Operation of scheduled rail service, as opposed to the West Chester Railroad's heritage operation, would require upgrades to infrastructure and ADA accessibility to its facilities. The deteriorated condition of the tracks limits passenger trains to a speed of 15mph and the section between Glen Mills and Wawa was impassable as of April 2022. The study concluded while restoration was feasible the projected ridership was not high enough to qualify for capital funding. In September 2021 local officials proposed a short-term plan to upgrade the West Chester Railroad in order to provide a shuttle service between the line's Market Street station in West Chester and SEPTA's new Wawa Station utilizing battery operated British Rail Class 230 cars manufactured by Vivarail.

== Notable infrastructure ==
The West Chester Branch uses many standard Pennsylvania Railroad building techniques, such as frequently using heavy stone masonry abutments (which can be seen supporting the superstructures below). Because the railroad often crosses the Chester Creek and local roads, a variety of bridges were used. The Pennsylvania Railroad commonly used riveted plate girder bridges for short to medium sized bridges, as seen below.

Bridges

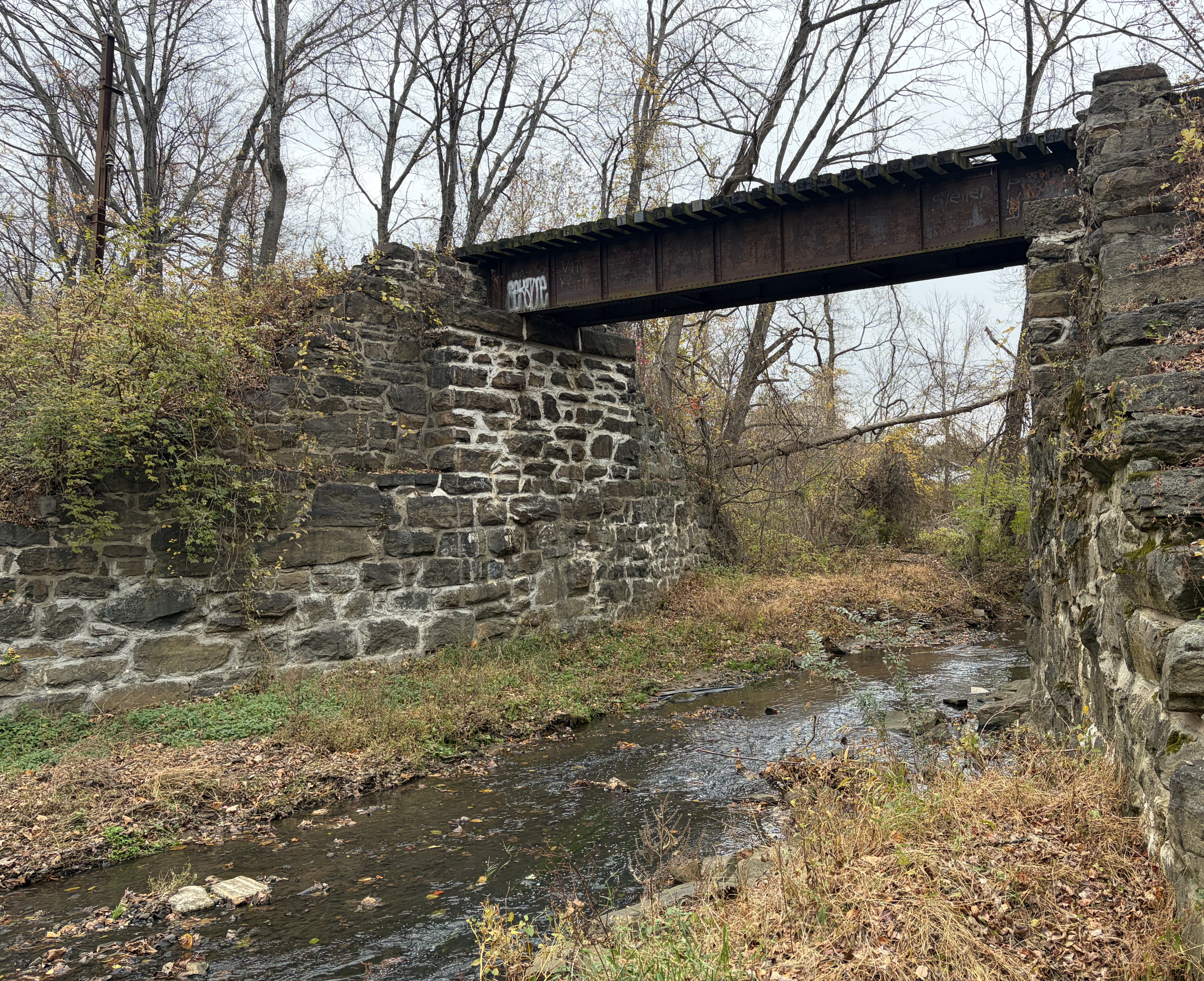
PRR style riveted plate girder bridge that crosses a portion of the Chester Creek.

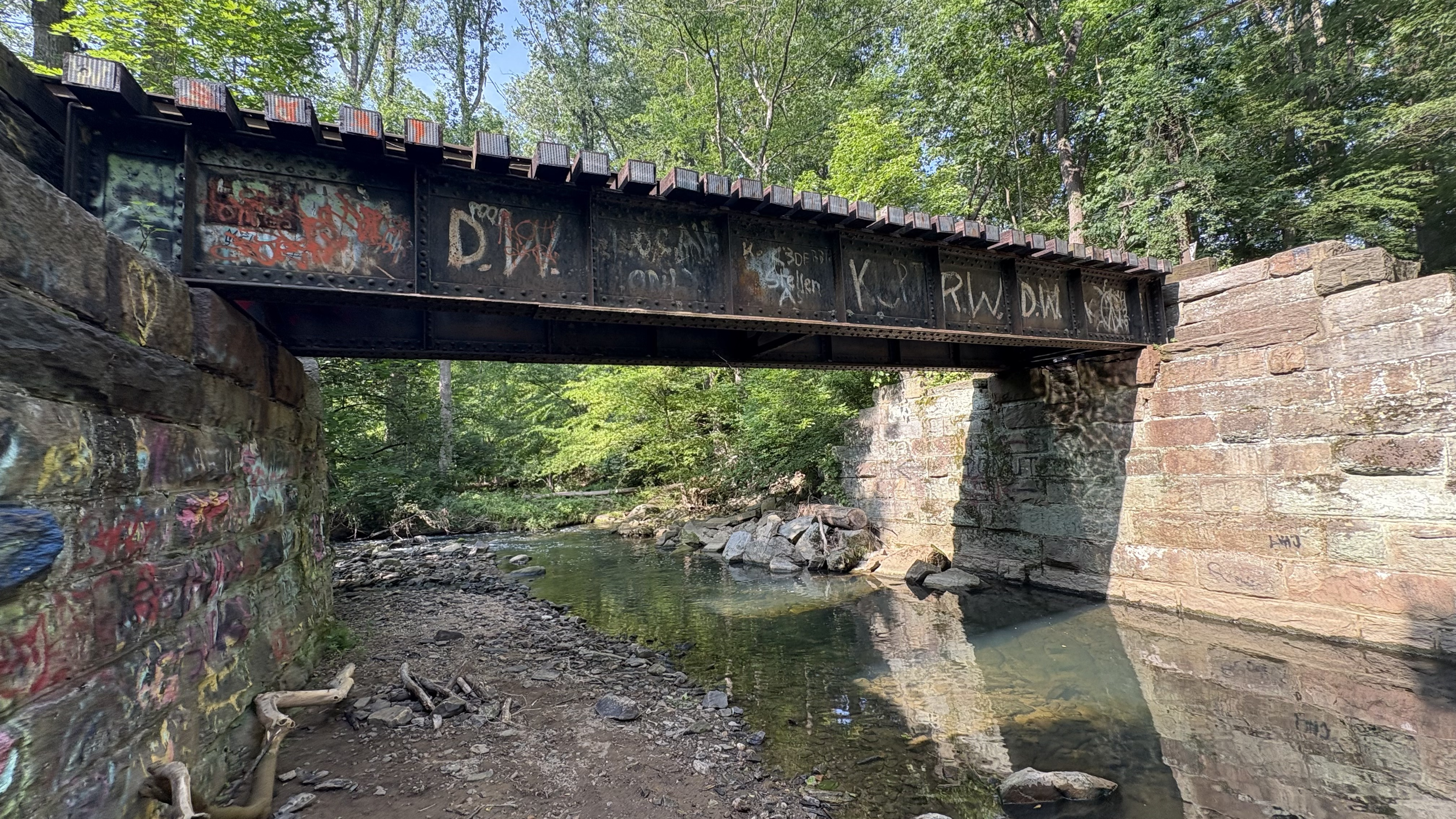
PRR style riveted plate girder bridge that crosses a portion of the Chester Creek. It intersects with Oakbourne Parks Yellow Trail.

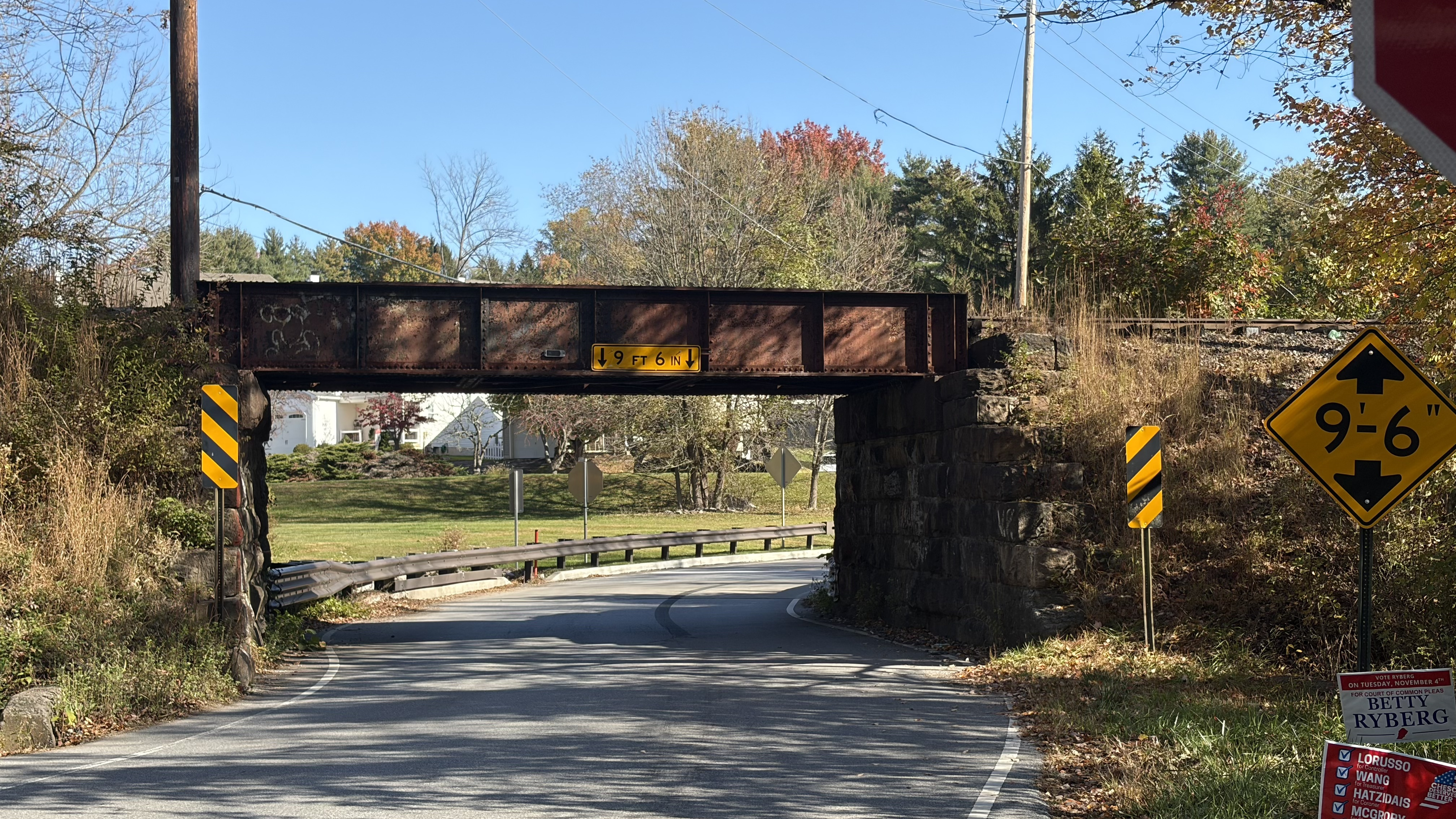
PRR style riveted plate girder bridge that crosses Oakbourne Road. It is positioned just next the former Oakbourne station.

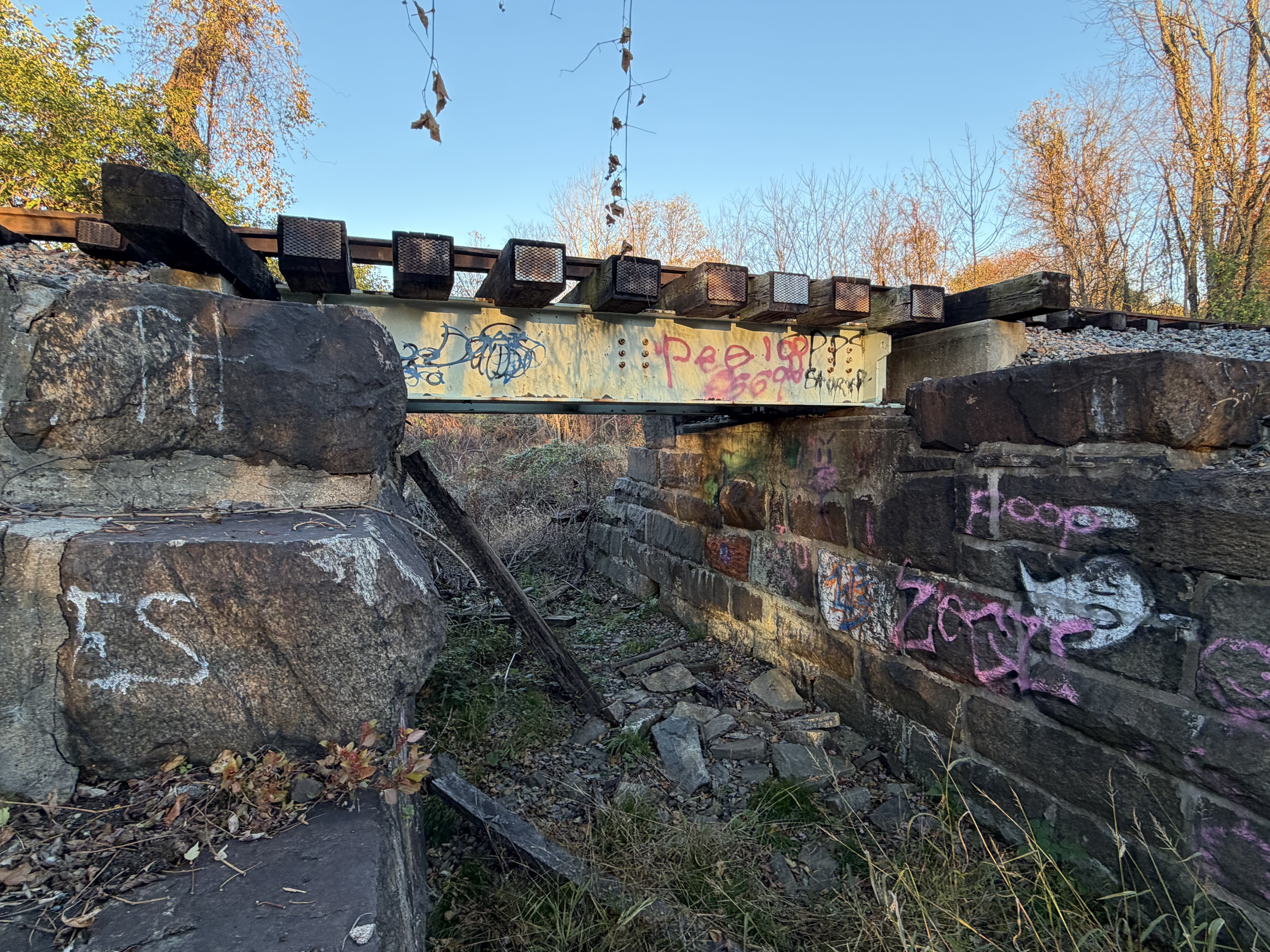
riveted plate girder bridge that crosses a smaller subsection of the Chester Creek , which was dried up at the time of capture. Positioned just behind West Chester Rustin High School.

== See also ==
- SEPTA Regional Rail
- West Chester Railroad (1831-1903)
