= West Chester station (West Chester Railroad) =

Train station in West Chester, Pennsylvania

West Chester
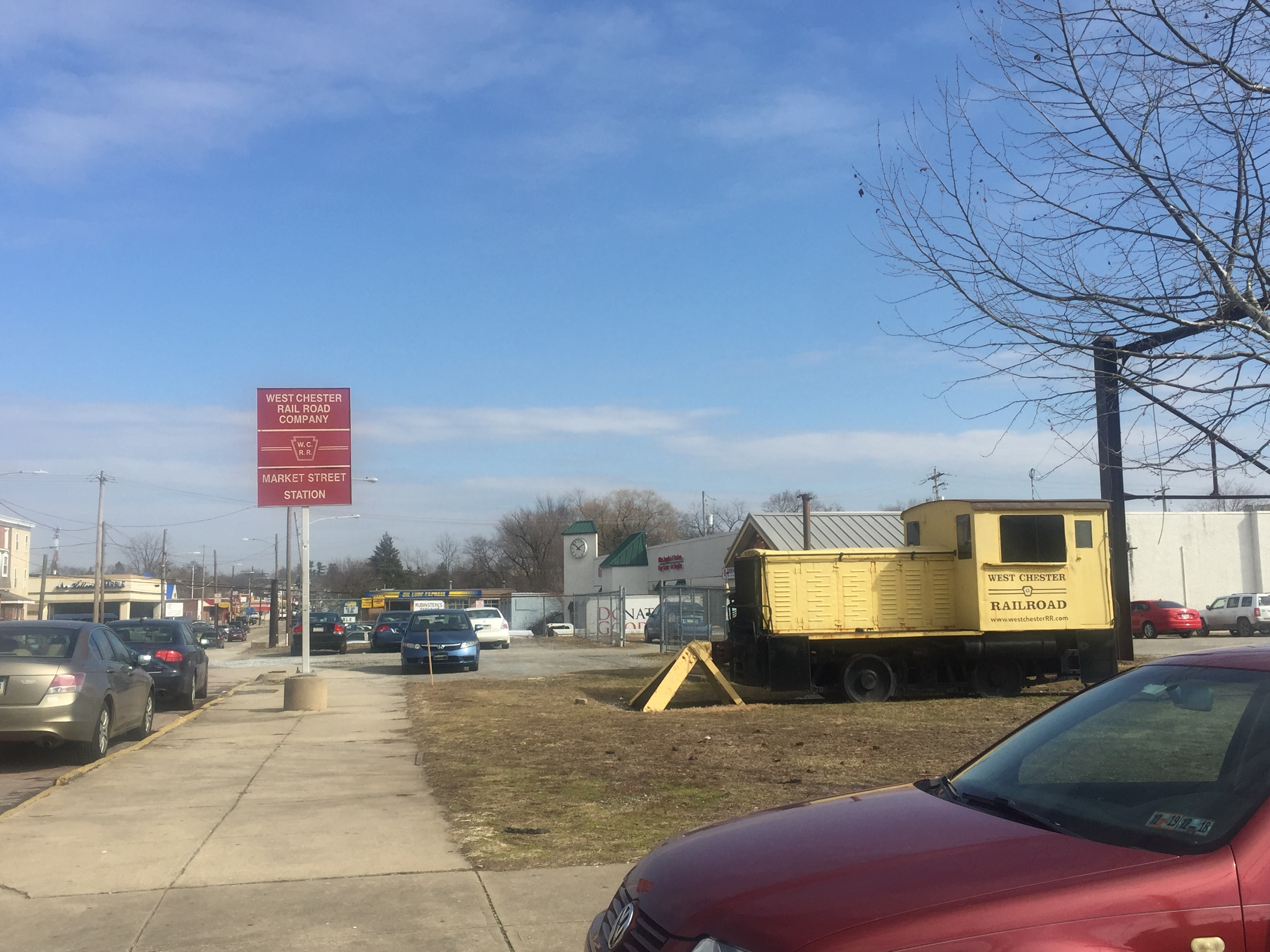
- West Chester station in 2018

General information
- Location: 230 East Market Street; West Chester, Pennsylvania
- Coordinates: 39.9609°N 75.6004°W
- System: West Chester Railroad tourist train station
- Owner: West Chester Railroad
- Line: West Chester Line
- Platforms: 1 side platform
- Tracks: 1

History
- Opened: November 11, 1858 (West Chester and Philadelphia Railroad); June 1997 (West Chester Railroad)
- Closed: September 19, 1986
- Rebuilt: 1885
- Electrified: December 2, 1928
- Former names: Market Street

Services
Preceding station	West Chester Railroad	Following station
Terminus	Main Line	Westtown toward Glen Mills
Former services
Preceding station	SEPTA	Following station
Terminus	West Chester Line	West Chester University toward Suburban Station
Preceding station	Pennsylvania Railroad	Following station
Terminus	West Chester Line	Oakbourne toward Suburban Station
Maple Avenue toward Frazer	Frazer – West Chester	Terminus
Location

West Chester station, formerly Market Street station, is an American train station that is located on Market Street in West Chester, Pennsylvania. It currently serves as a stop on the West Chester Railroad heritage railroad. The location was previously used as a stop on the Pennsylvania Railroad's (PRR) West Chester Branch, and later became a part of SEPTA's R3 West Chester Line.

SEPTA discontinued regular passenger service here in September 1986, due to deteriorating track conditions, Chester County's desire to expand facilities at Exton station on SEPTA's Paoli/Thorndale Line, and the existence of faster and more frequent bus service on SEPTA Route 104 along West Chester Pike to 69th Street Terminal.

Heritage service was restored in 1997 by the West Chester Railroad, a privately owned and operated tourist railroad that operates between Glen Mills and West Chester.

== Station history ==
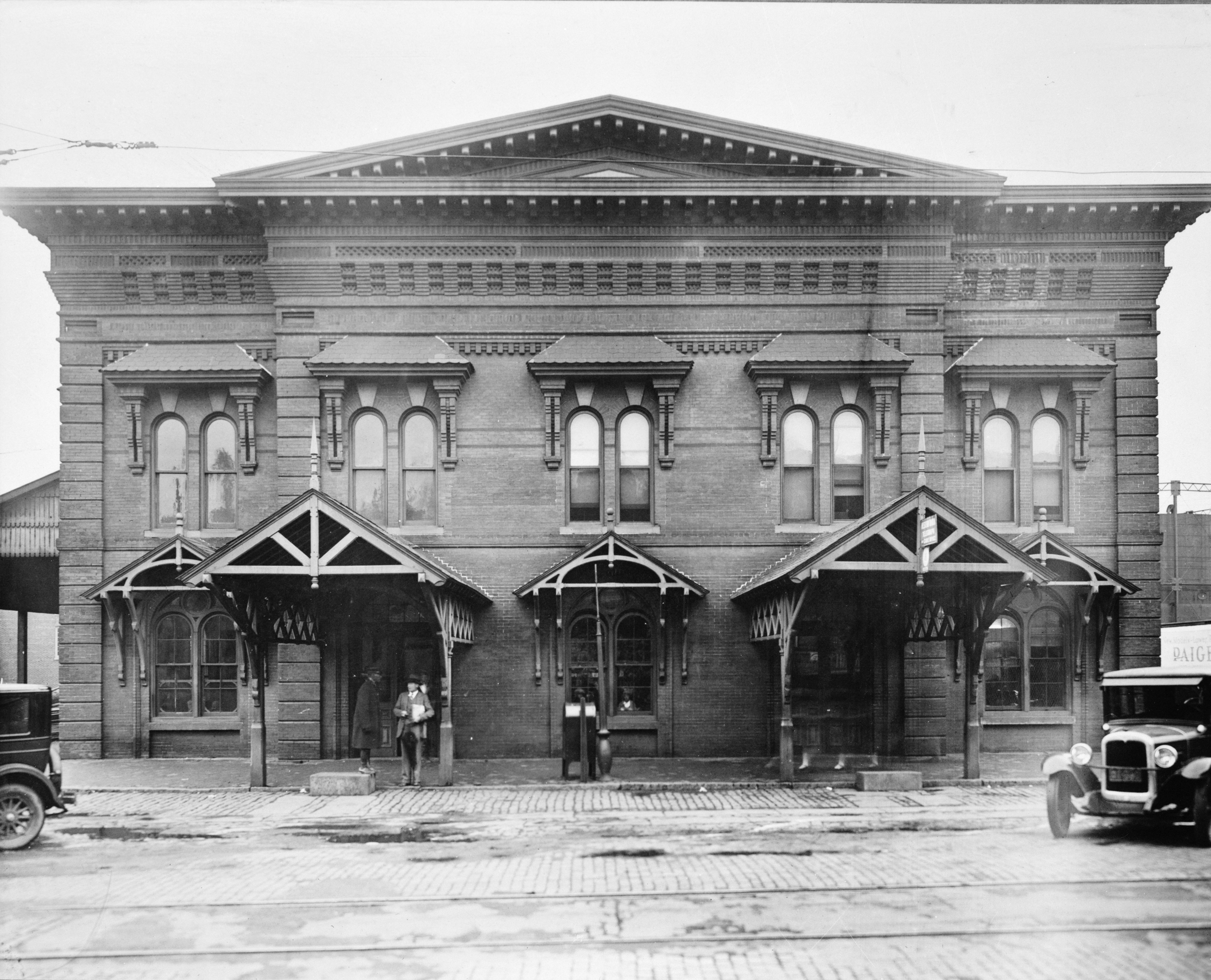
East Market Street Station in West Chester circa 1930

The West Chester & Philadelphia Railroad opened Market Street station in 1875. It was rebuilt following a major fire in 1885. Demolition of the main station building occurred in 1968.

SEPTA later used the stop for the R3 West Chester Line. In 1986, SEPTA discontinued service due to deteriorating track conditions, the expansion of Exton station, and the improvement of bus service on SEPTA Route 104. The frame building erected in place of the older station was closed and razed.

In 1997, the West Chester Railroad (WCRR) constructed a new station for its heritage line running to Glen Mills. Except for the concrete platform, nothing remains of the former station; however, the foundation outline from the former building is visible. WCRR erected a one-room station on site that serves as a ticket office and gift shop.

== Service restoration efforts ==
In 2014, the Chester County Planning Commission's long-term public transportation plan envisioned the return of SEPTA service to West Chester. In 2018 a Pennsylvania Department of Transportation report estimated rebuilding to cost $380M USD. In July 2022 the West Chester Borough Council formed a Rail Service Restoration Committee to explore the use of battery-operated rail cars as a lower cost alternative to a full rebuilding of an electrified line.
