= Glen Mills, Pennsylvania =

Unincorporated community in Pennsylvania, US

- Unincorporated community
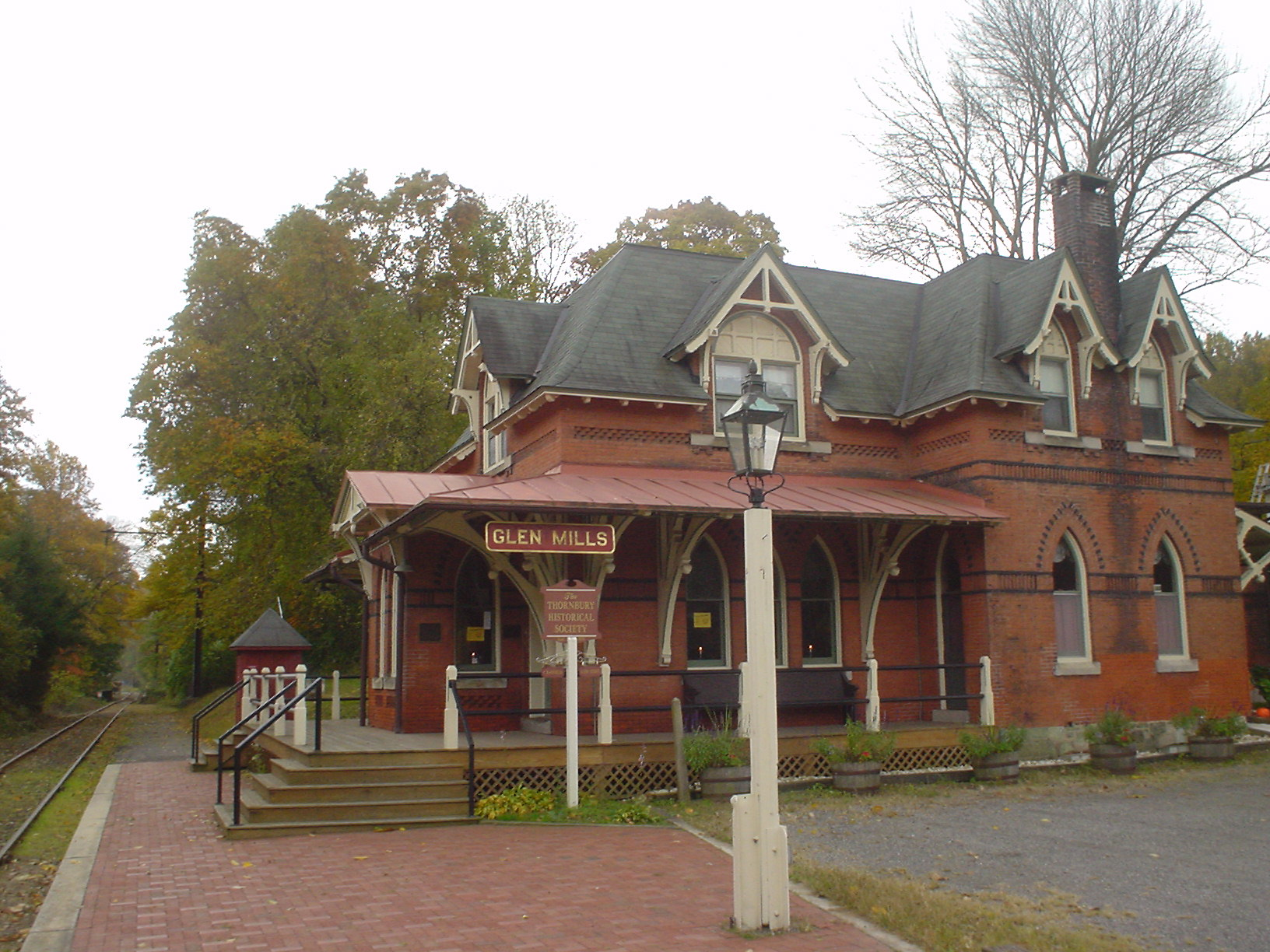
- Railway station, built 1882

- Location of Glen Mills in Pennsylvania Glen Mills (the United States)
- Coordinates: 39°55′09″N 75°29′30″W
- Country: United States
- State: Pennsylvania
- County: Delaware
- Township: Concord
- Elevation: 213 ft (65 m)
- Time zone: UTC−5 (EST)
  - Summer (DST): UTC−4 (EDT)
- ZIP Code: 19342
- Area codes: 610 and 484

Pennsylvania Historical Marker
- Designated: September 23, 1997

Glen Mills is an unincorporated community in Concord Township, Delaware County, Pennsylvania, United States, located approximately 27 miles west of Philadelphia. The ZIP Code for Glen Mills is 19342.

== History ==
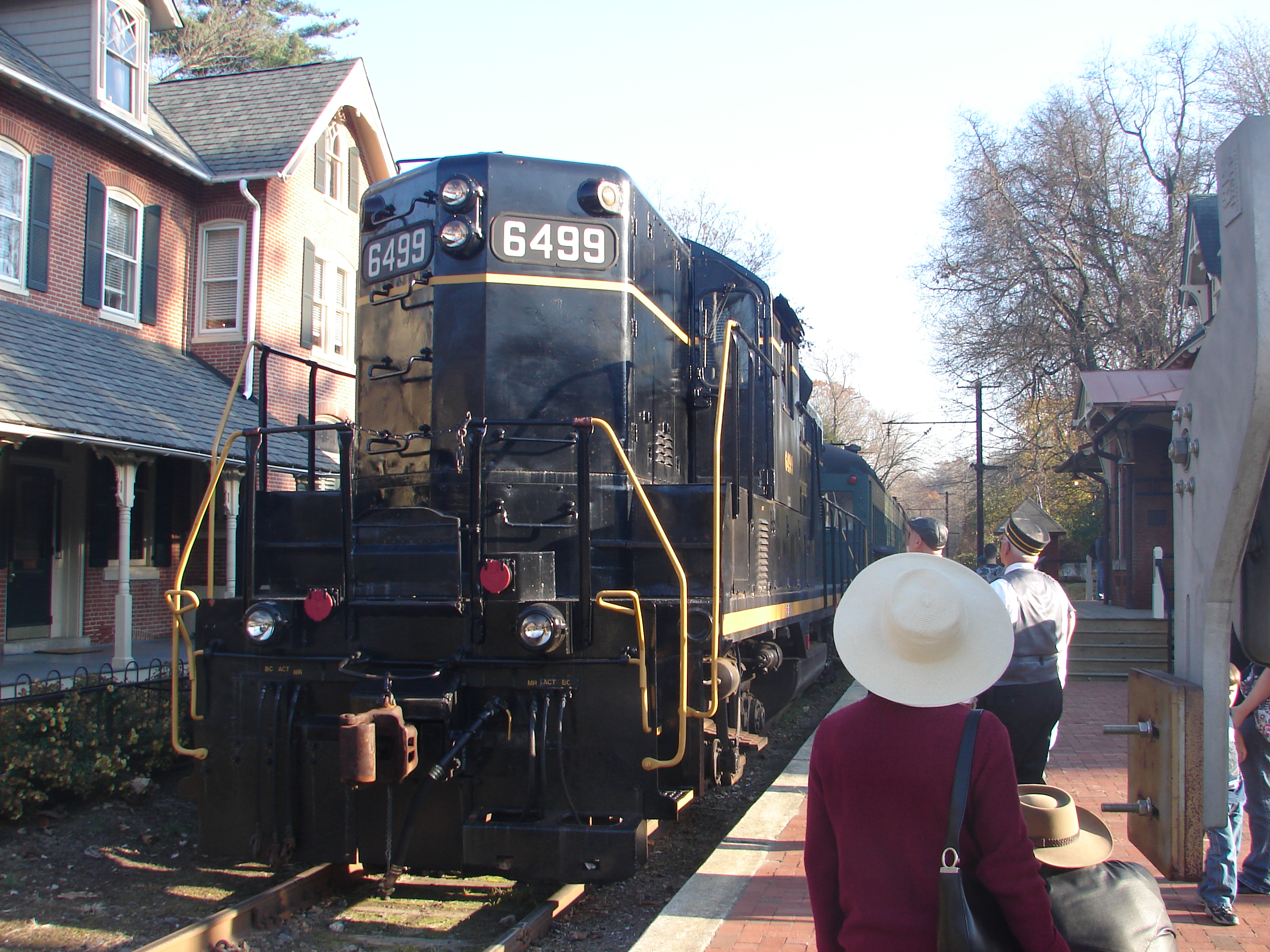
A West Chester Railroad train at Glen Mills Station

The area around Glen Mills was part of the original land grant given to William Penn in 1681. George Cheyney was the first settler here, for which the nearby town of Cheyney is named. Later, this land was sold and divided. The name Glen Mills is taken from two paper mills built by the Willcox family, one in 1835 and the second in 1846. From 1864 to 1878, these mills supplied the United States government with a special, patented paper for the printing of government bonds and notes.

The Glen Mills are no longer standing, but the grist mill built by Nathaniel Newlin in 1704 still stands and is a popular destination for picnickers and history buffs alike. A blacksmith shop was built on the former property in 1975. The Newlin Mill Complex was listed on the National Register of Historic Places in 1983.

The West Chester and Philadelphia Railroad arrived in Glen Mills c. 1858, and provided train service between Philadelphia and West Chester. The Pennsylvania Railroad took control of the rail line in 1880. Passenger trains through Glen Mills were operated by SEPTA until 1986. The West Chester Railroad, a heritage railway, currently operates trains between Glen Mills and West Chester on weekends.

A Wild West themed restaurant/roadside attraction known as The Longhorn Ranch operated in Glen Mills during the 1960s. In the 1980s, that same site was the location of Pulsations nightclub. The site is currently the location of a retirement community.

A Glen Mills resident, pilot Michael R. Horrocks, died in the September 11, 2001 attacks. He was the first officer on Flight 175, the second plane to hit the World Trade Center.

== Golf ==
The Golf Course at Glen Mills was designed by Bobby Weed and is connected to the Glen Mills Schools. The golf facility is used to train students in golf operations and turf management.

== Geography ==
The Glen Mills ZIP Code, 19342, is unusual in the numerous geographic boundaries it crosses. It is located almost entirely in Delaware County.

=== Townships ===
In order of land share:

- Concord Township, Delaware County
- Thornbury Township, Delaware County
- Edgmont Township, Delaware County
- Middletown Township, Delaware County
- Thornbury Township, Chester County
- Chadds Ford Township, Delaware County
- Chester Heights

=== School districts ===
In order of land share:

- Garnet Valley School District
- West Chester Area School District
- Rose Tree Media School District
- Unionville-Chadds Ford School District

== Notable people ==
- T.D. Allman, American author, foreign correspondent and historian
- Kenny Connors, American Professional Ice Hockey Player
- John Edwards, US Congressman
- April Margera, American reality television personality
- Victor Yerrid, American actor and puppeteer
