= West Chester and Philadelphia Railroad =

Railway line in Philadelphia, US

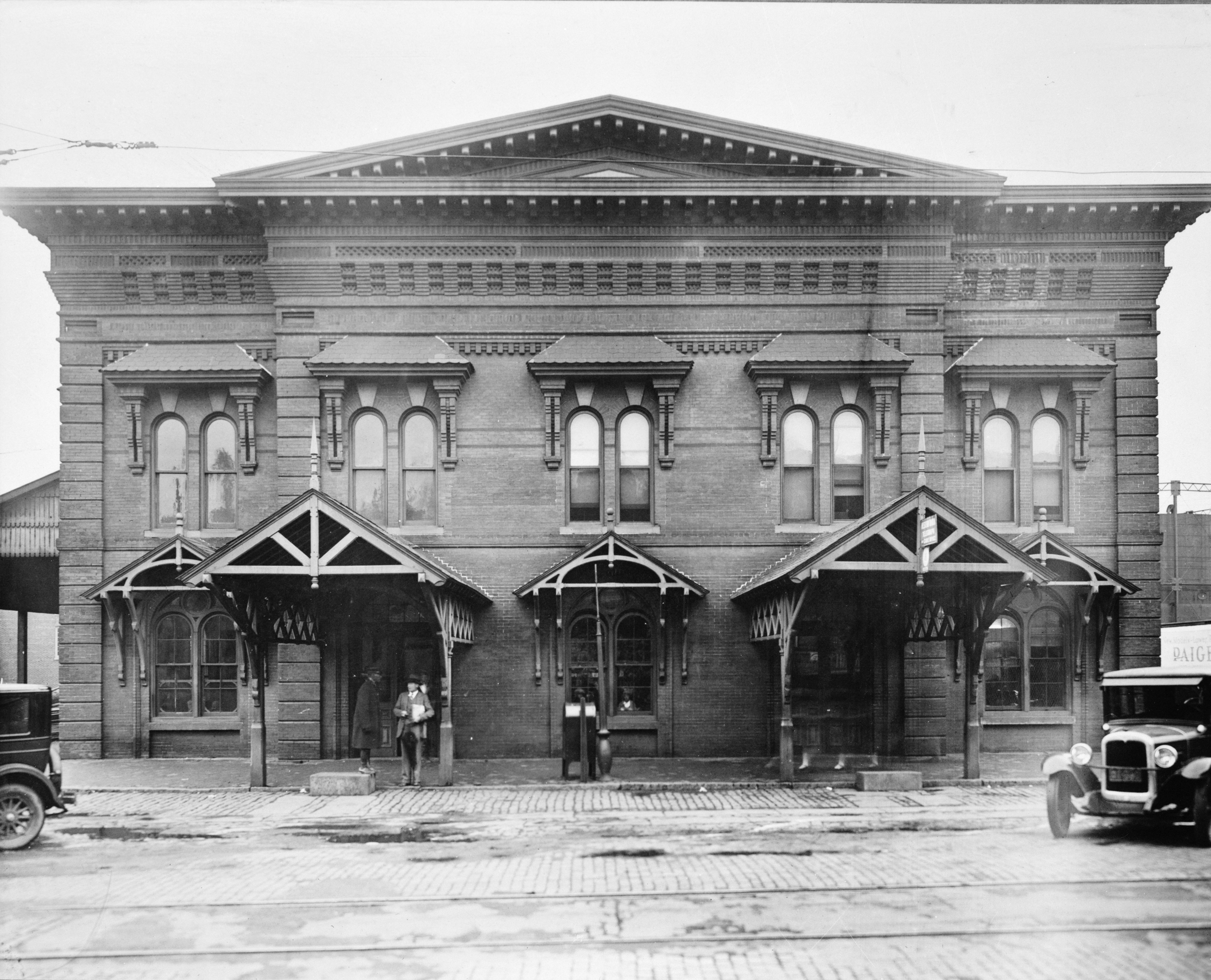
- East Market Street Station in West Chester, built 1875, in a 1930 photo; the station was demolished in 1968

Overview
- Headquarters: Philadelphia, Pennsylvania
- Locale: Chester/Delaware/Philadelphia counties, Pennsylvania
- Dates of operation: 1848–1881
- Successor: Philadelphia & Baltimore Central Railroad

Technical
- Track gauge: 1,435 mm (4 ft 8 1/2 in)
- Length: 28.36 miles (45.64 kilometres)

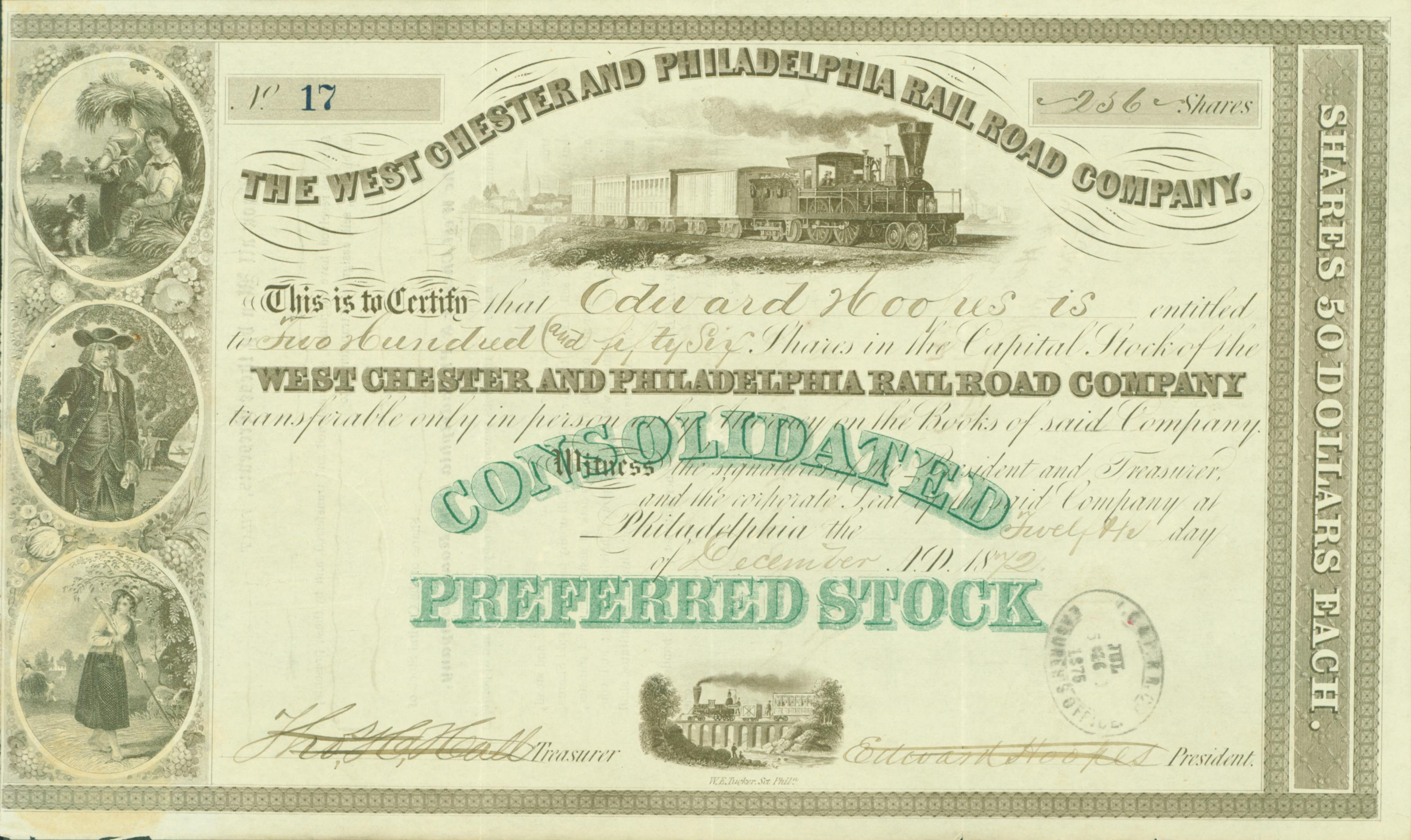
Share of the West Chester and Philadelphia Rail Road Company, issued 12 December 1872

The West Chester & Philadelphia Railroad (WC&P) operated in the greater Philadelphia area from 1848 to 1881. It later became the West Chester Branch of the Pennsylvania Railroad (PRR). It has been operated as the Media/Wawa Line on the SEPTA system since 2022. It was known as the Media–Elwyn Line from 1983 to 2022.

== History ==
=== Construction ===
The West Chester and Philadelphia Railroad was chartered by the Commonwealth of Pennsylvania in 1848, and the company was organized in 1851. Construction began in Philadelphia in 1852, and the road reached Kellyville (now Gladstone) in November 1853, and Media by November 1854. In July 1855, at least one worker died in a construction accident and costs mounted due to construction of numerous bridges.

Financial difficulties followed, and work was suspended until 1856, when the line opened to Grubb's Bridge (now Wawa). The remaining line to West Chester was completed by November 1858. The WC&P was the second railroad to serve the borough of West Chester. The first was the West Chester Railroad, built in 1832 and running northeast to a PRR connection at Malvern.

A junction was constructed at Wawa for the Philadelphia and Baltimore Central Railroad, which began construction in 1855 and opened its first section to Chadds Ford, Pennsylvania, in 1859.

In May 1880, the Philadelphia, Wilmington & Baltimore Railroad purchased the WC&P, and then folded it into the Philadelphia & Baltimore Central Railroad Company by the following year. The PRR eventually took control of all these earlier lines.

=== End of the line ===
The PRR merged with the New York Central Railroad in 1968 to form the Penn Central (PC), and was bankrupt by 1970. The West Chester line was sold to SEPTA in 1978, though Conrail provided operations until 1983, when SEPTA assumed passenger operations until September 1986 when service was suspended. Tourist operator West Chester Railroad resumed operations between West Chester and Glen Mills in 1997.

== See also ==
- List of defunct Pennsylvania railroads
- Chester Creek Branch
- Wawa Station
