= West Chester Railroad =

Tourist railroad in Pennsylvania, U.S.

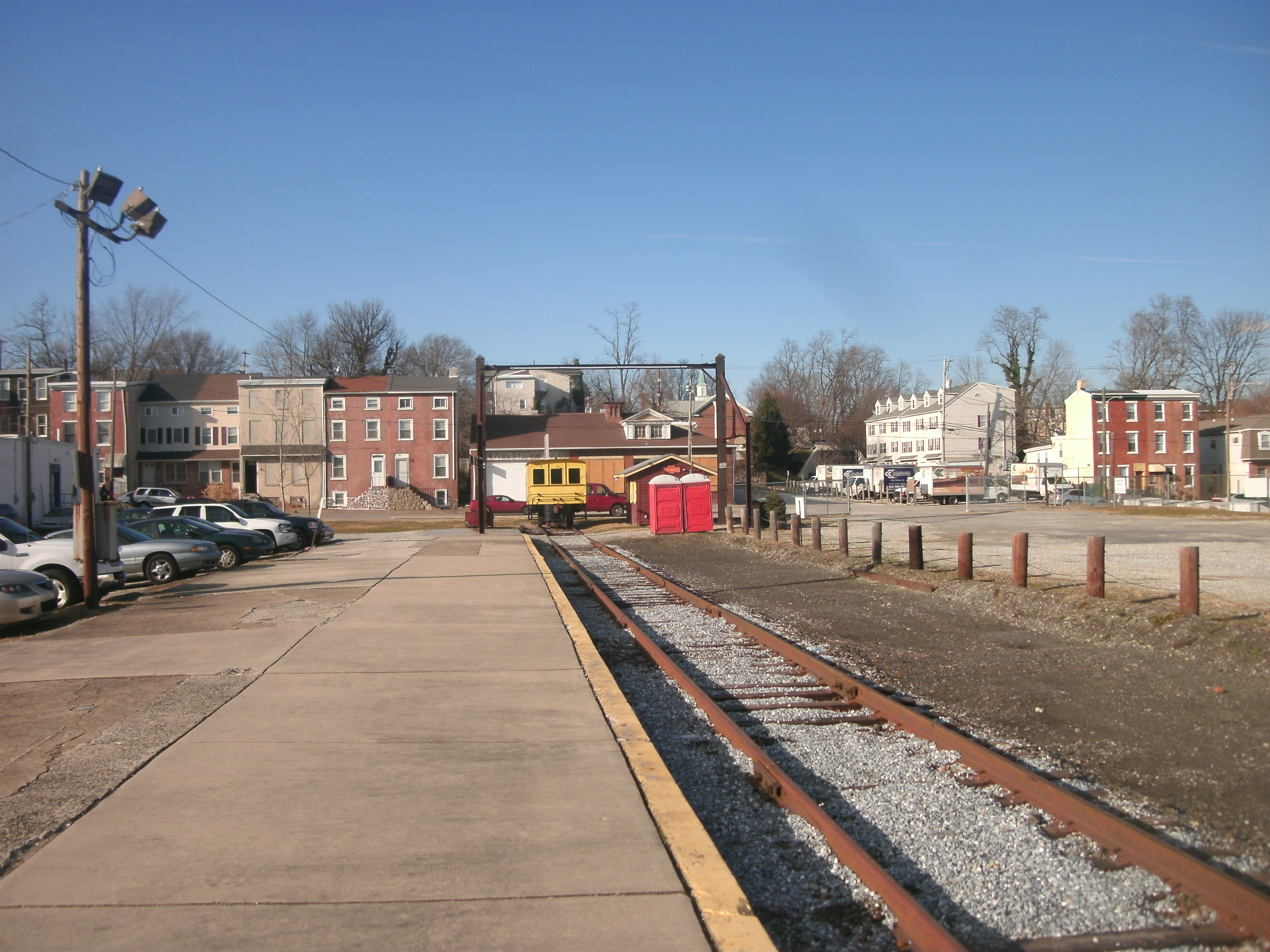
- The WCRL station in 2013
- Locale: Chester/Delaware counties, Pennsylvania, USA
- Terminus: West Chester, Pennsylvania

Commercial operations
- Built by: West Chester & Philadelphia Railroad
- Original gauge: 4 ft 8 1/2 in (1,435 mm)

Preserved operations
- Reporting mark: WCRL
- Length: 7.7 mi (12.4 km)
- Preserved gauge: 4 ft 8 1/2 in (1,435 mm)

Commercial history
- Opened: November 1858
- 1858: West Chester & Philadelphia Railroad begins
- Closed: September 1986

Preservation history
- 1997: West Chester Railroad began operating
- Headquarters: West Chester, Pennsylvania

Website
- www.wcrailroad.com

The West Chester Railroad (reporting mark WCRL) is a privately owned and operated tourist railroad that runs between Market Street in West Chester, Pennsylvania, in Chester County, and the village of Glen Mills, Pennsylvania, in Delaware County.

The West Chester Railroad operates 90-minute round-trip excursions over 7.7 miles (12.4 km) of former Pennsylvania Railroad track on the West Chester Branch. Trains operate Sundays, June through December. Besides the regular trains, the schedule expands with Saturday rides for a number of special events including Easter, Mother's Day, Father's Day, Memorial Day, Halloween, and Christmas. The railroad is owned by the for-profit 4 States Railway Service, Inc. and operated by the West Chester Railroad Heritage Association, a non-profit organization dedicated to the preservation of the railroad. All employees of the railroad are volunteers.

== Proposed commuter rail reactivation ==
In 2018, the Pennsylvania Department of Transportation commissioned a feasibility study for rebuilding the line and restoring direct commuter rail service from West Chester to Philadelphia's 30th Street Station. SEPTA service below the Elwyn station was terminated in 1986 due to low ridership and unsafe track conditions but the area has since grown in population and has few transportation alternatives. The study concluded that restoration was feasible but the projected ridership was not high enough to qualify for capital funding.

In September 2021, local officials proposed a short-term plan to upgrade the trackage in order to provide a shuttle service between the line's Market Street station in West Chester and SEPTA's new Wawa Station. The proposed shuttle would use battery-powered cars rebuilt from retired London transit cars. These cars however do not meet US Federal Railroad Administration collision standards and WCRR could not operate their standard heavy weight trains while the shuttle is running. Further, a physical barrier between the shuttle cars and SEPTA cars would have to be built at the proposed Wawa transfer point.

== Equipment ==
=== Locomotives ===
Locomotive details
Number	Image	Model	Built	Manufacturer	Status
1		20-ton switcher	1940s	Plymouth	Display
3 (B&O 9115)		S-2	1949	American Locomotive Works	Out of service
1803		RS-18u	1960	Montreal Locomotive Works	Operational
4213		Century 424	1965	American Locomotive Works	Out of service
6499		GP9	1957	Electro-Motive Division	Operational
7706		GP38	1969	Electro-Motive Division	Operational

=== Former units ===
Locomotive details
Number	Image	Model	Built	Manufacturer	Status
4230		Century 424	1965	American Locomotive Works	Sold to NDC Railroad
9		65-ton switcher	1941	General Electric	Sold to private owner in Delaware

== See also ==
- List of heritage railroads in the United States
- Media/Wawa Line
- Woodland Station
