= Wawa (company) =

American convenience store chain

Wawa Inc.

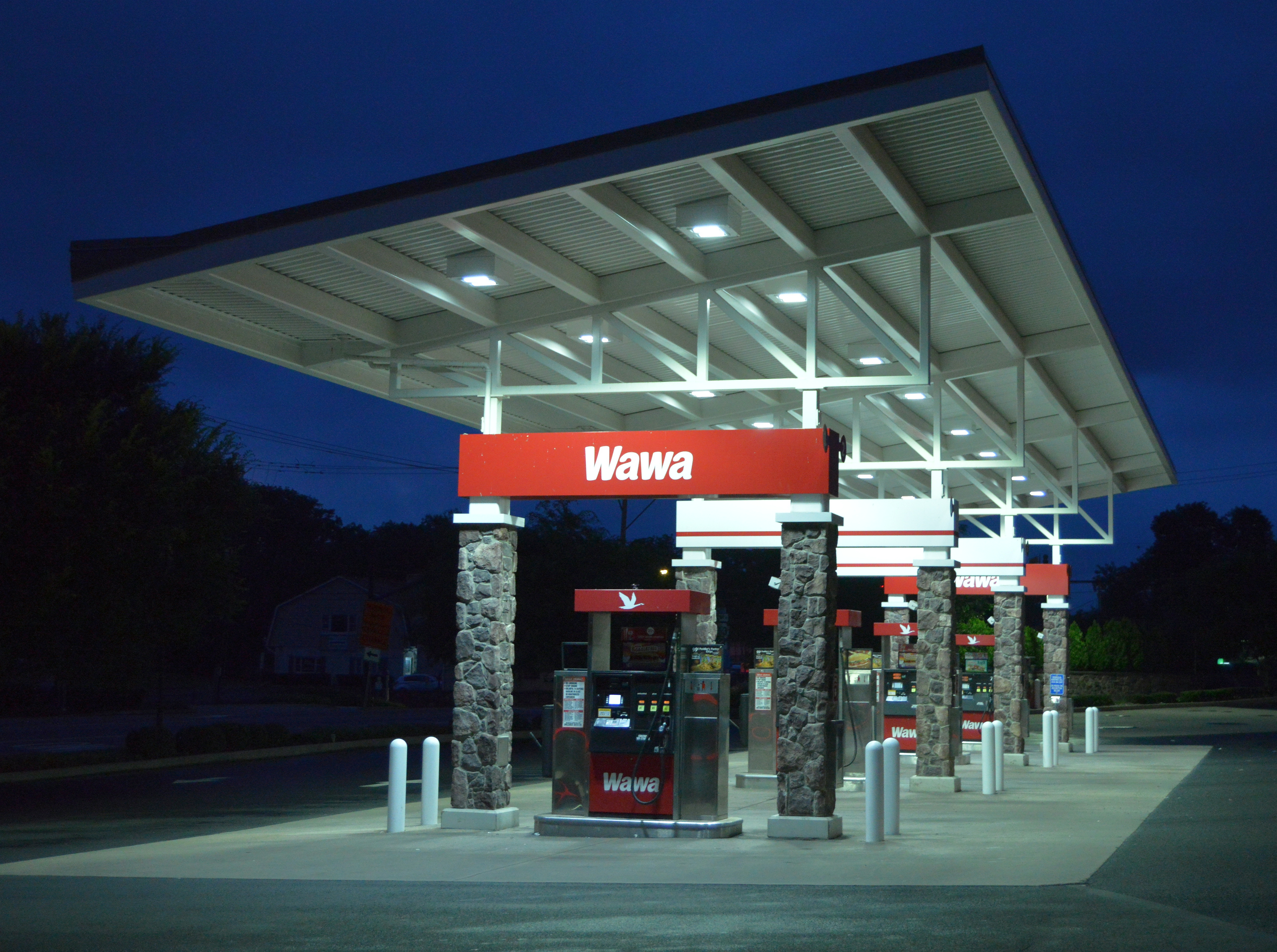
- A Wawa gas station in Skippack, Pennsylvania
- Type: Private
- Industry: Convenience store; Gas station; Fast food
- Founded: April 16, 1964; 62 years ago
- Founder: Grahame Wood
- Headquarters: Wawa, Pennsylvania, United States
- Number of locations: 1,271 (1,107 have fuel; 11/20/2026)
- Area served: Alabama, Delaware, Florida, Georgia, Indiana, Kentucky, Maryland, New Jersey, North Carolina, Ohio, Pennsylvania, Tennessee, Virginia, Washington, D.C., West Virginia; Former: New York and Connecticut
- Key people: Chris Gheysens (CEO)
- Products: Coffee; Hoagies; Prepared foods; Gasoline; Beverages; Snacks; Dairy products; Salads
- Revenue: ▲US$13 billion (2020)
- Net income: ▲US$118 million (2011)
- Total assets: ▲US$1.57 billion (2011)
- Owner: Wood family (59%); Employee-owned (41%)
- Number of employees: 37,000 (2020)
- Website: www.wawa.com

Wawa Inc. (/wɑːwɑː/ WAH-WAH) is an American chain of convenience stores and gas stations originating in the Philadelphia metropolitan area and operating along the East Coast of the United States. Wawa is based in and primarily associated with the Philadelphia metropolitan area, though it gradually expanded its store locations, over many decades, far beyond the Philadelphia area. The company's headquarters is located in the Wawa area of Chester Heights, Pennsylvania, in Greater Philadelphia.

As of 2008, Wawa was the largest convenience store chain in the Philadelphia metropolitan area and the third-largest food retailer in greater Philadelphia after Acme Markets and ShopRite.

== History ==
Wawa's logo from 1990 to 2004

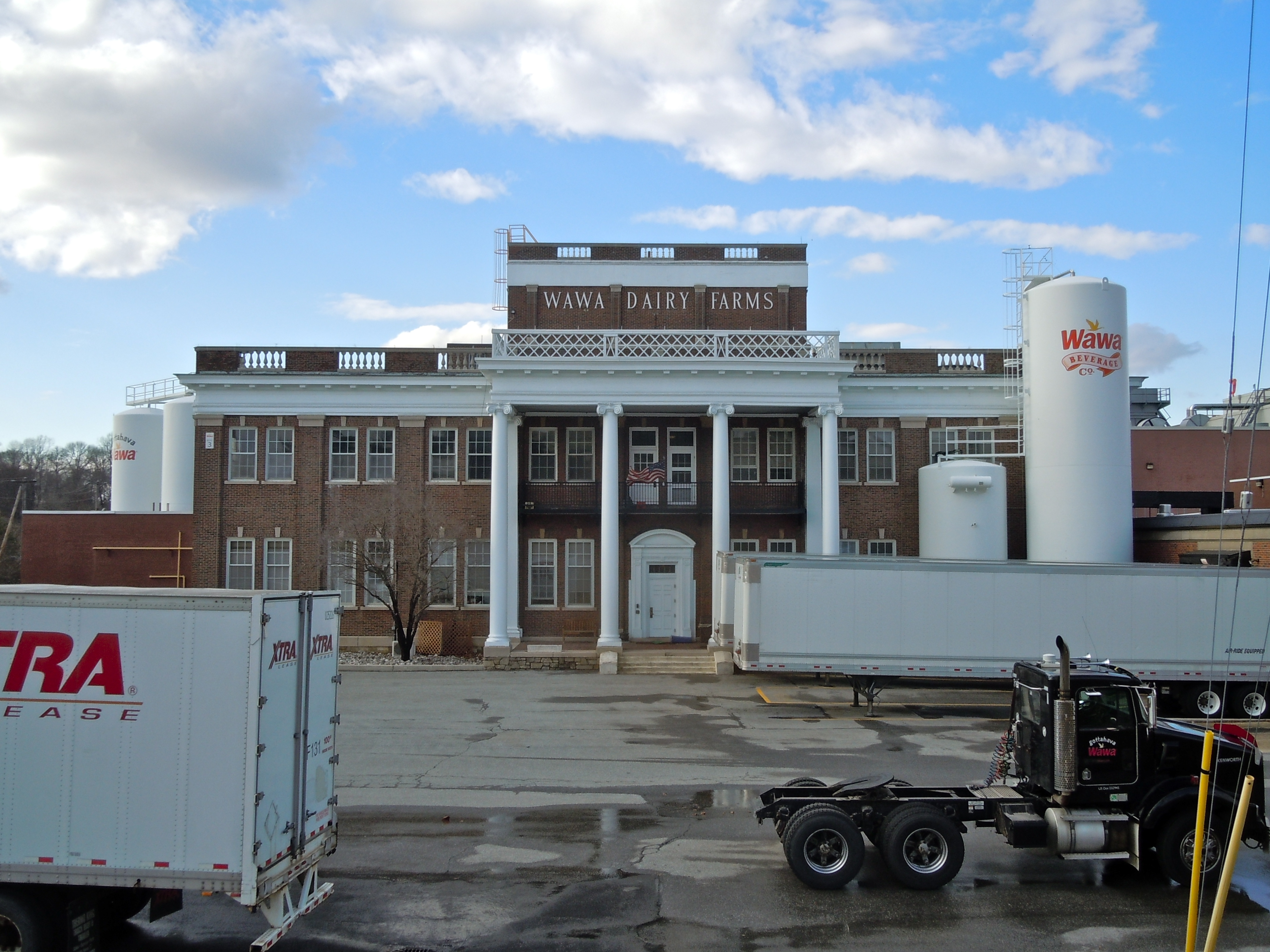
The former Wawa Dairy Farms building in Wawa, Pennsylvania

The Wawa business began in 1803 as an iron foundry. In 1890, George Wood, an entrepreneur from New Jersey, moved to Delaware County, Pennsylvania; it was here that he began the Wawa Dairy Farm. Wood imported cows from the British Crown dependency island of Guernsey, and bought 1,000 acres (400 ha) of land in the Chester Heights area; the corporate headquarters would later be renamed Wawa. Since pasteurization was not yet available, many children faced sickness from consuming raw milk. Wood arranged for doctors to certify his milk was sanitary and safe for consumption, which convinced many consumers to buy the product. The strategy worked, and allowed the Wawa dairy to grow. Demand for dairy products grew rapidly during the 1920s, and so did the company. Wawa began using the slogan "Buy Health by the Bottle"; they served customers in Pennsylvania and New Jersey, delivering milk to customers' homes.

In the 1960s, however, many consumers began buying milk in stores instead of using home delivery. Wawa started to open its own stores to adjust to these market changes. On April 16, 1964, Grahame Wood, George Wood's grandson, opened the first Wawa Food Market at 1212 MacDade Boulevard in Folsom, Pennsylvania, which remained in operation until June 17, 2016, when it closed in favor of a new "Super Wawa" down the street. A parade was held from the original location to the new store on opening day.

The Wawa Food Market stores were also part of a then-new trend in retailing, the convenience store. Open both earlier and later than traditional supermarkets, they carried other foods and beverages besides milk, as well as other items from the Wawa dairy.

In 1977, Wawa began sharing ownership of the company with its associates through profit-sharing plans. In 1992, Wawa formalized its associate ownership with its employee stock ownership plan (ESOP), with stock being awarded to associates annually based on the prior year's service. Because the company is privately held, Wawa secures an independent assessment of its stock value at regular intervals to ensure that the ESOP is fairly maintained. Today, the ESOP accounts for more than 40% of Wawa stock.

In October 2026, Wawa was included in the 2027 Forbes Best Customer Service list.

== Company ==
=== Name and logo ===
The chain's name comes from the site of the company's first milk plant and corporate headquarters in the Wawa, Pennsylvania area. The name of the town Wawa is in turn derived from the Ojibwe word we'we (pronounced "way-way") meaning snow goose, despite the company's image of a Canada goose.

Henry Wadsworth Longfellow uses the word "Wawa" in Book II of his 1855 poem "The Four Winds" in The Song of Hiawatha, in which he writes, "He it was who ... sent the wild-goose, Wawa, northward." Although the poem does not identify the species, an image of a Canada goose in flight appears in Wawa's corporate logo.

Wally Goose, an anthropomorphic Canada goose wearing a Wawa shirt, is the mascot for the company, and is used in store openings and marketing material.

=== Leadership ===
The current CEO of Wawa is Chris Gheysens, who succeeded Howard Stoeckel in January 2013. Eleuthère (Thère) du Pont has served as both the CFO and president, but is no longer associated with the company. Richard "Dick" Wood Jr. is chairman of the board of directors. Many Wood family members are active in the company. Although Wawa is a family-run business, Wawa associates own roughly 50% of the company, more than 40% of which is owned through the company's employee stock-ownership program.

=== Holdings and locations ===
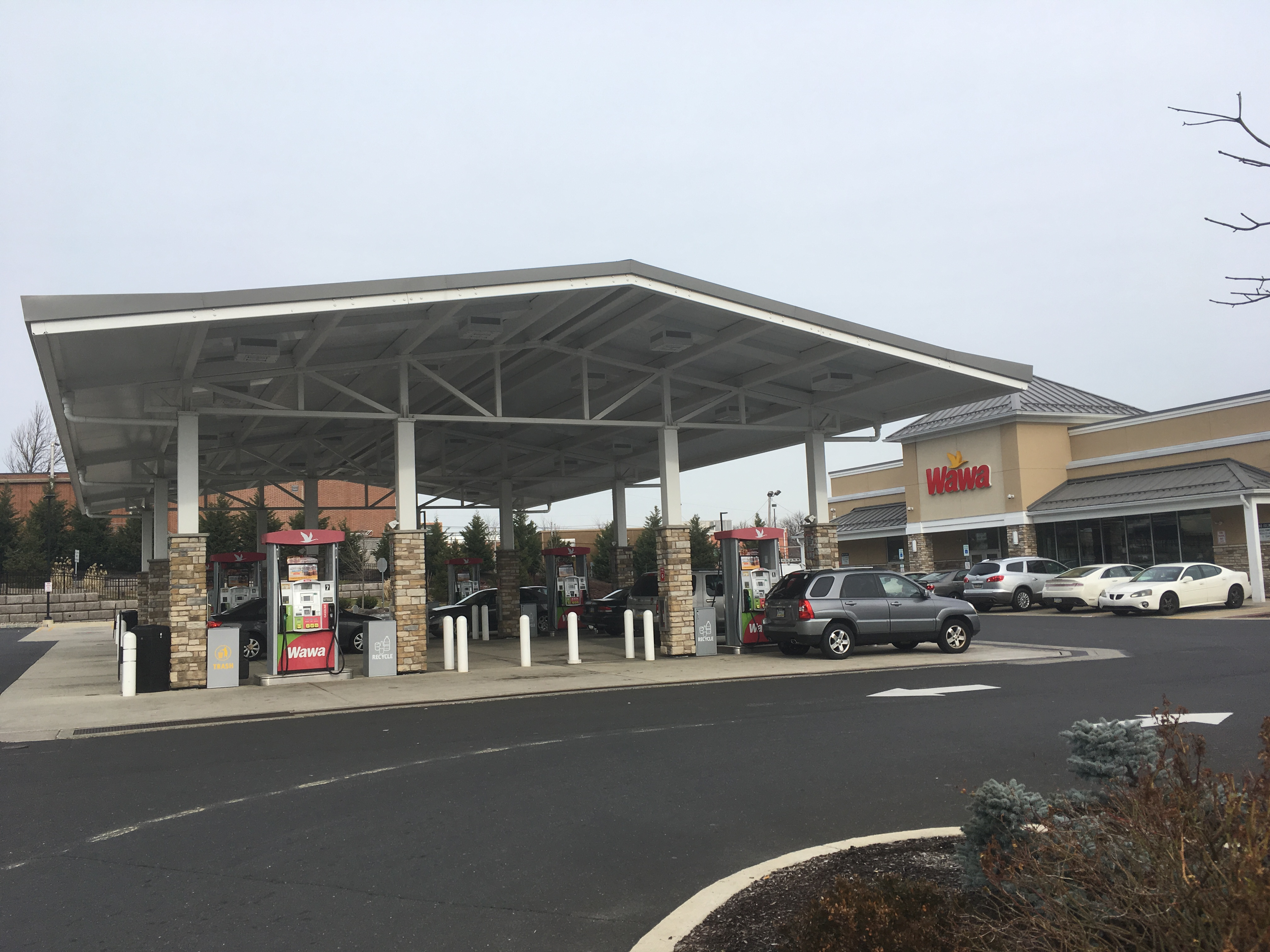
A Wawa convenience store and gas station in Willow Grove, Pennsylvania

In 2015, Wawa ranked 34th on the Forbes magazine list of the largest private companies, with total revenues of $9.68 billion. As of 2016, Wawa employs over 22,000 people in 720+ stores (450+ offering gasoline). As of 2008, Wawa's New Jersey stores were concentrated mostly in South Jersey.

As of 1989 Wawa Inc. and the Wood family together control about 725 acres (293 ha) of land, containing the corporate headquarters, the Wawa dairy farm, and J.T. Farms, within two municipalities in Delaware County, Pennsylvania. The properties are located in Chester Heights and Middletown Township. Wawa Inc. owns 50 acres (20 ha) of land around "Red Roof," the corporate headquarters, 150 acres (61 ha) of land around the Wawa dairy, and the 225-acre (91 ha) J.T. Farms. The Wood family owns 300 acres (120 ha) of estate property. Cynthia Mayer of the Philadelphia Inquirer said that, as a result of the land holdings, the Wood family was "the closest thing to a feudal barony this side of du Pont."

Beginning in the 1940s, the dairy facility began selling excess parcels of land. In 1964, it sold about 40 acres to the Franklin Mint. Several years prior to 1989, the dairy sold 25 acres of land to a retirement complex, Granite Farms Estates. The process of selling excess land continued sporadically.

Wawa Inc. owns the 225-acre J.T. Farms, a separate farm property. As of 1989 Wawa Inc. leases it to Bill Faul, who maintained a herd of 100 Holstein cattle and paid $1,500 (currently $2778.12) per month. Wawa continued to own the farm due to symbolic reasons. It also kept heifers along Route 1 in a strip of land adjacent to the plant which did not produce milk; Fritz Schroeder, then-vice president of Wawa Inc., said in 1989, "[w]e like them for the ambiance."

==== Corporate headquarters ====
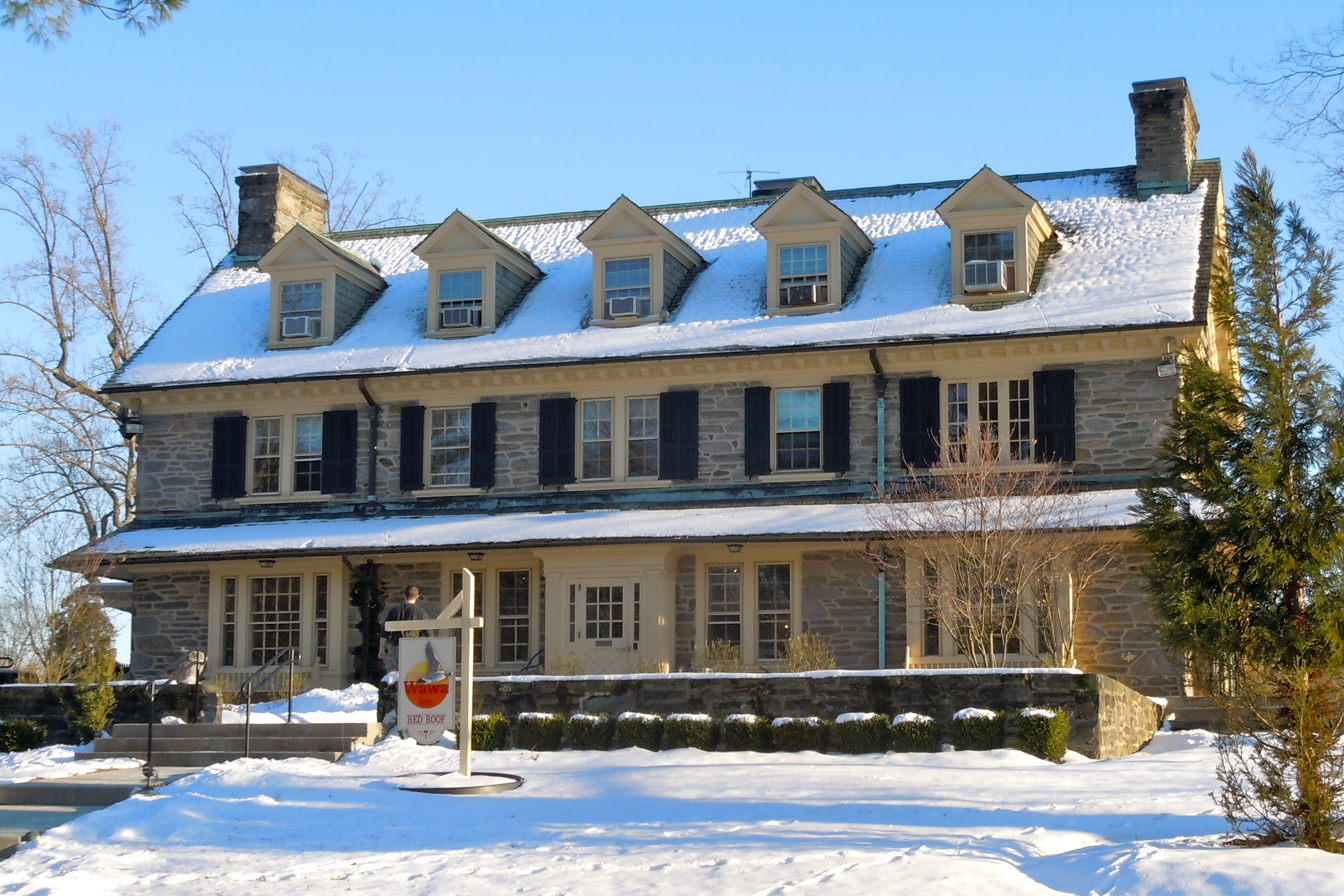
"Red Roof" at Wawa headquarters in Chester Heights, Pennsylvania

The company's corporate headquarters is located in the Wawa area, along Baltimore Pike in Chester Heights. The headquarters is in proximity to Middletown Township. As of 2011 about 300 employees work in the headquarters. The Borough of Chester Heights receives a majority of its local services tax from employees of Wawa.

== Programs and promotions ==
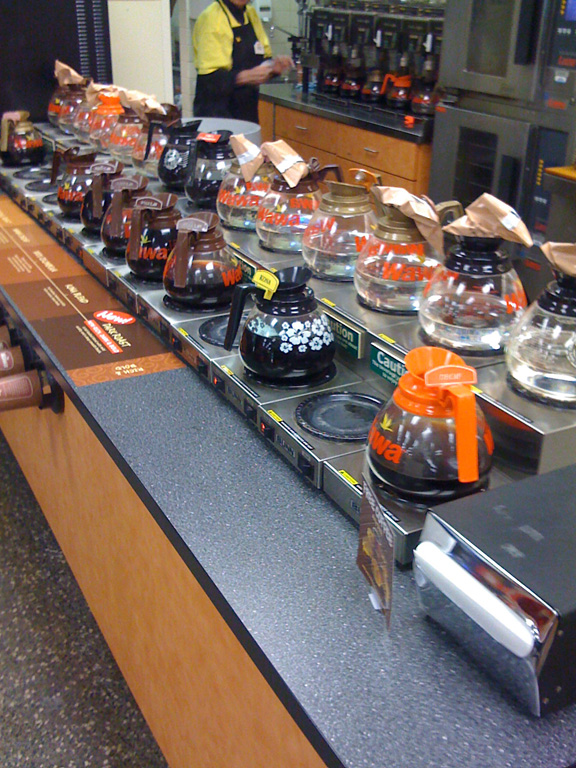
A Wawa coffee bar counter, a Wawa staple for years

Wawa provides surcharge-free ATMs, the result of a partnership with PNC Bank that began in 1985. Wawa implemented the program in stores in 1996. In 2010, Wawa surpassed 1 billion transactions under the PNC brand.

In the late 1980s and through the 1990s, Wawa engaged in a scholarship sponsorship program that involved Irish students (mainly from UCC in Cork, Ireland) running some stores on the Pennsylvania Main Line, allowing the students to study for their MBAs from Saint Joseph's University in Philadelphia.

In 1994, Wawa opened a store in Center City, Philadelphia, which sold food only.

In 1994, Wawa debuted the "Super Wawa", larger stores with public restrooms and more parking. Gasoline pumps were added in 1996. On October 21, 2010, Wawa began testing the sale of diesel fuel at 12 of its New Jersey locations due to an increasing number of cars using this fuel.

In the 2000s, Wawa was among the first stores to implement self-serve computer touch-screen menus for food orders, in an attempt to improve order accuracy, speed and for upselling.

In 2003, Wawa and McLane Co. reached a 30-year agreement to construct a distribution center in Carney's Point, New Jersey, to handle the majority of Wawa's distribution. The center began operation in May 2004.

In 2005, Wawa partnered with JPMorgan Chase to offer a Visa credit card branded with the Wawa name. It ceased issuing new cards in December 2007 and the program was canceled in November 2010. Wawa would later partner with Citi to restart the Wawa credit card program.

Wawa moved into social media to connect with its customers, and in 2006, its "I Love Wawa" MySpace page had over 5,000 members. By the middle of 2013, its Facebook page had reached nearly 1.1 million likes.

On June 30, 2010, 20 Wawa locations in Pennsylvania started a trial of selling Pennsylvania Lottery tickets from automated kiosks. On December 6, 2010, it announced that all 210 Pennsylvania Wawa locations would sell lottery tickets from kiosks by spring 2011.

On April 16, 2014, to celebrate its 50th anniversary, Wawa gave away free coffee and launched a nonprofit foundation to donate $50 million to health and hunger initiatives.

== Products ==
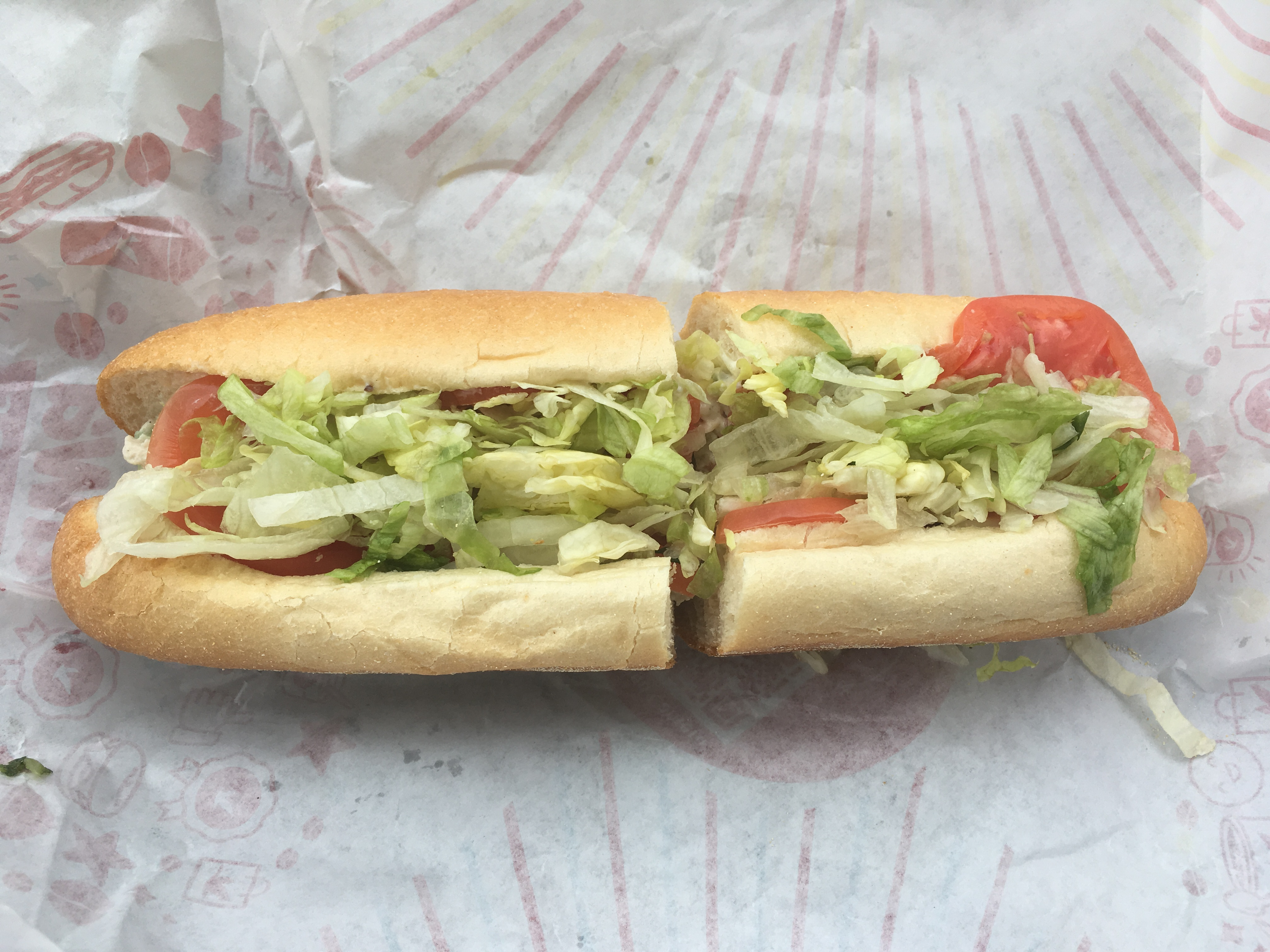
A chicken salad hoagie from Wawa

Wawa offers products found at most convenience chain marts such as chips, drinks, and soda. Wawa also sells its own branded iced tea, orange juice, and milk. Wawa used to sell its own branded soda but it has been discontinued. Wawa has Coca-Cola Freestyle soda fountains.

Key products include its variety of coffee, latte, and cappuccino flavors and sizes, and made-to-order hoagies. Wawa also offers a brand of hot breakfast products, most famous of which is the "Sizzli", and also a full deli with touch-screen ordering of sandwiches, hot sides, drinks, and deli meats. Wawa sells alcohol in Florida, Virginia, and at select locations in Pennsylvania.

For a short time between 1994 and 1996, Wawa sold Pizza Hut personal pan pizzas and Taco Bell burritos. In 2014, Wawa began selling a 7.5-inch deep-dish pizza on focaccia bread available in five varieties; this was later discontinued.

Since 2008, Wawa has run "Hoagiefest" during the summer months, offering hoagies at a discounted price. The promotion carries a 1960s theme.

In 2020, Wawa tested burgers, waffle fries, and chicken sandwiches at six locations. Later in the same year, Wawa begin testing a dinner menu at select locations. The dinner menu includes items such as burgers, fries, pasta, and rotisserie chicken.

In 2022, Philadelphia magazine ranked the Gobbler, Wawa's seasonal Thanksgiving-themed hoagie, as the chain's best sandwich among 15 taste-tested.

In 2023, Wawa began selling pizza during dinner hours at select locations, with plans to expand pizza to all locations. The pizza comes in 14-inch and 16-inch sizes in either plain or with an assortment of toppings.

== Store locations ==
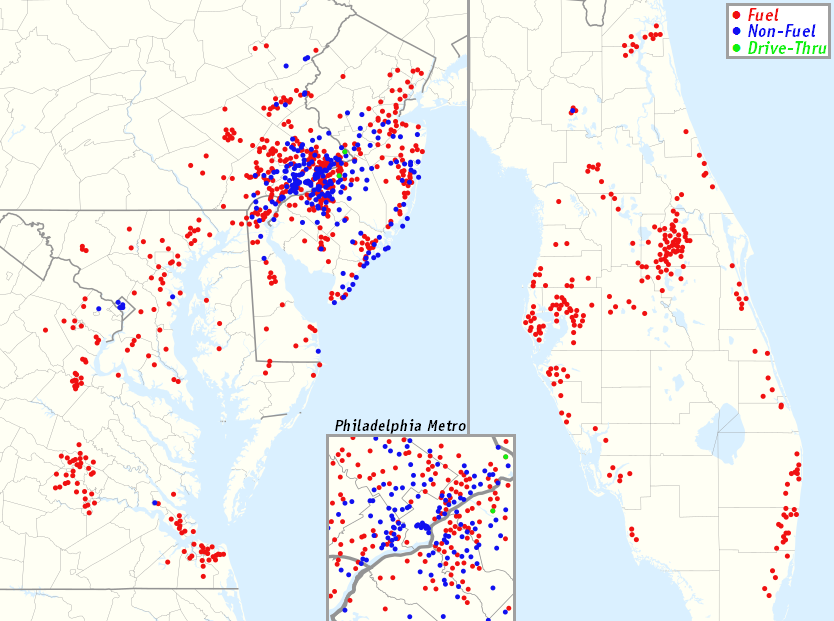
Wawa footprint as of January 2021

Wawa operates stores in Alabama, Delaware, Florida, Georgia, Indiana, Kentucky, Maryland, New Jersey, North Carolina, Ohio, Pennsylvania, Tennessee, Virginia, Washington, D.C., and West Virginia. Wawa once had convenience stores in the states of New York and Connecticut, but in the late 1990s, the decision was made to abandon the stores in most of the New York Metropolitan Area, except for New Jersey as it was too competitive. The abandoned stores were re-branded when they were sold to Krauszer's (in Connecticut) and a variety of other convenience retailers, but most are still recognizable as they retain their distinctive "Wawa" design. The company continued to operate numerous stores in Central Jersey and South Jersey, and re-entered North Jersey in 2010, when Wawa opened a new store in Parsippany and came into competition with QuickChek. Wawa opened its 100th Super Wawa in New Jersey on October 12, 2012, in Woodbridge. Wawa moved farther into North Jersey opening in Kearny on January 11, 2013, and Lodi on October 4, 2013. The company plans to open five Wawas a year in North Jersey for the next 10 to 12 years.

On July 18, 2012, Wawa entered the Florida market when it opened its first location in Orlando. It had expanded to more than 70 Florida locations by the end of 2015, with plans for 120 more by 2022.

As of October 2020, Wawa had over 900 locations across Delaware, Maryland, New Jersey, Pennsylvania, Virginia, Washington, D.C., and Florida.

In some Jersey Shore towns, Wawa designs its stores to match the aesthetic, and changes operating procedures to adapt to shore culture. In Cape May, Wawa has a Victorian-themed store. In Wildwood, there is a 1950s-themed store. Additionally, its Princeton University/Princeton train station store went viral on TikTok in 2023 for its "aesthetically pleasing" minimalist design.

Wawa opened its largest location at the time in the Farragut Square area of Washington, D.C. on December 14, 2017. On December 14, 2018, Wawa opened a flagship location at 6th Street and Chestnut Street in Center City, Philadelphia. The store, at 11,500 square feet (1,070 m^{2}), is the largest Wawa location and features a living greenery wall, large digital screens, couches, café seating, and two "Philly Firsts" murals.

On December 18, 2020, Wawa opened its first drive-thru at a convenience store/gas station location in Westampton, New Jersey. In September 2020, Wawa began construction on its first drive-thru only location in Falls Township, Bucks County, Pennsylvania; this location opened on January 8, 2021, and closed in October 2024.

In 2022, Wawa announced their intentions to expand to North Carolina by 2024. On May 16, 2024, the company opened its first location there, in Kill Devil Hills. The company also announced plans to open stores in the Florida Panhandle (including Panama City, Pensacola, and Tallahassee) and Mobile, Alabama in 2024. Its first store in Alabama opened on April 25, 2024, in Fairhope. Wawa has plans to expand into the Nashville area in Tennessee, with the first location to open in 2025 and plans for up to 40 stores. In 2022, Wawa announced a push into South Central Pennsylvania and specifically Harrisburg (which has long been Sheetz territory), but also has Rutter's and Turkey Hill as strong local competitors alongside national competitors such as 7-Eleven and Speedway. In October 2022, Wawa announced it would be expanding into Georgia, with the first location opening in Waycross, by 2024. On December 7, 2022, Wawa announced an expansion into Kentucky, Indiana, and Ohio after 2025.

In 2023, the first Ohio location was approved and is located in Liberty Township, near Cincinnati. In 2023, it was announced that up to 40 Kentucky locations would be opened.

On May 15, 2025, Wawa opened its first Indiana location in Daleville. Stores in Noblesville and Clarksville soon followed, respectively on May 22 and May 30. In late 2024, Wawa broke ground on its first two Kentucky locations, one in Louisville and the other in the Lexington suburb of Nicholasville. The first opening in the state was in Louisville's Okolona neighborhood on July 24, 2025.

On August 28, 2025, Wawa opened its first travel center in Hope Mills, North Carolina. Designed primarily for short-haul professional drivers, it offers an onsite truck scale and free overnight parking, but no showers.

Wawa opened its first West Virginia location in September 2025, in Inwood.

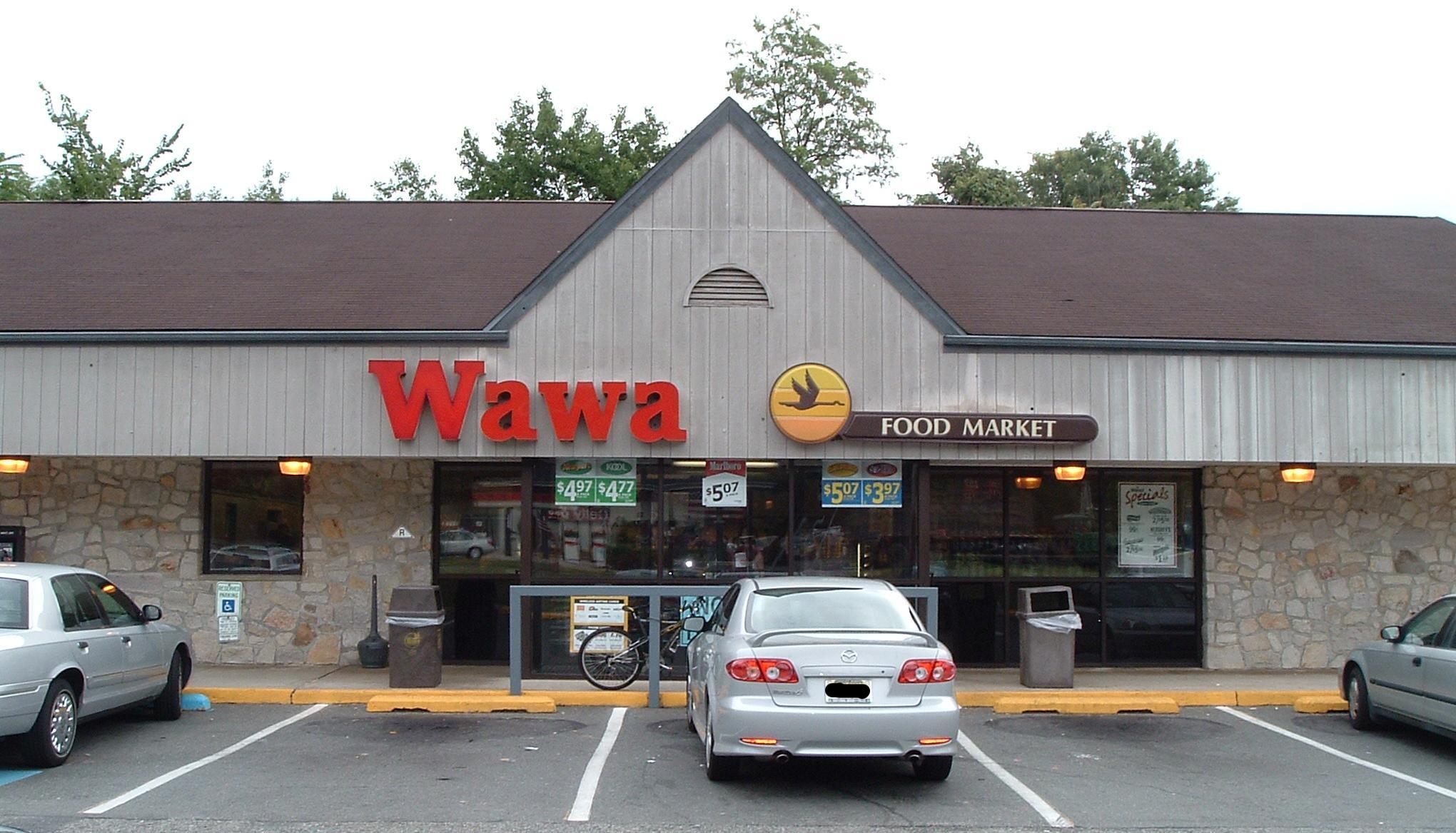
An older Wawa in Sewell, New Jersey

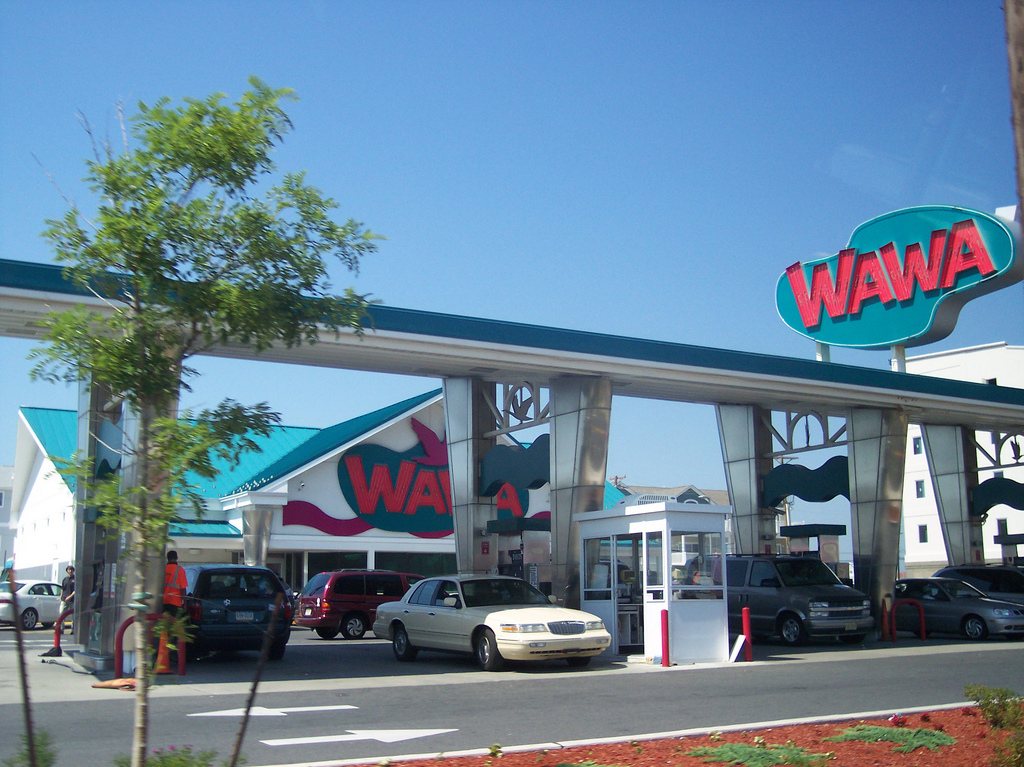
A retro-styled Wawa in Wildwood, New Jersey

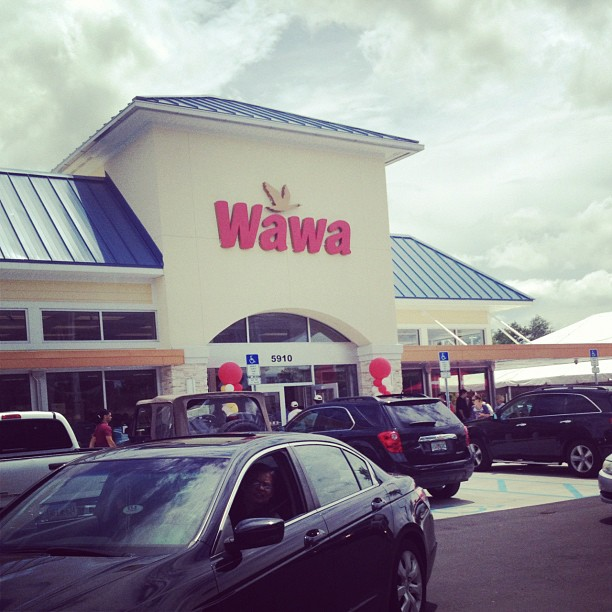
A Wawa in Orlando, Florida on opening day

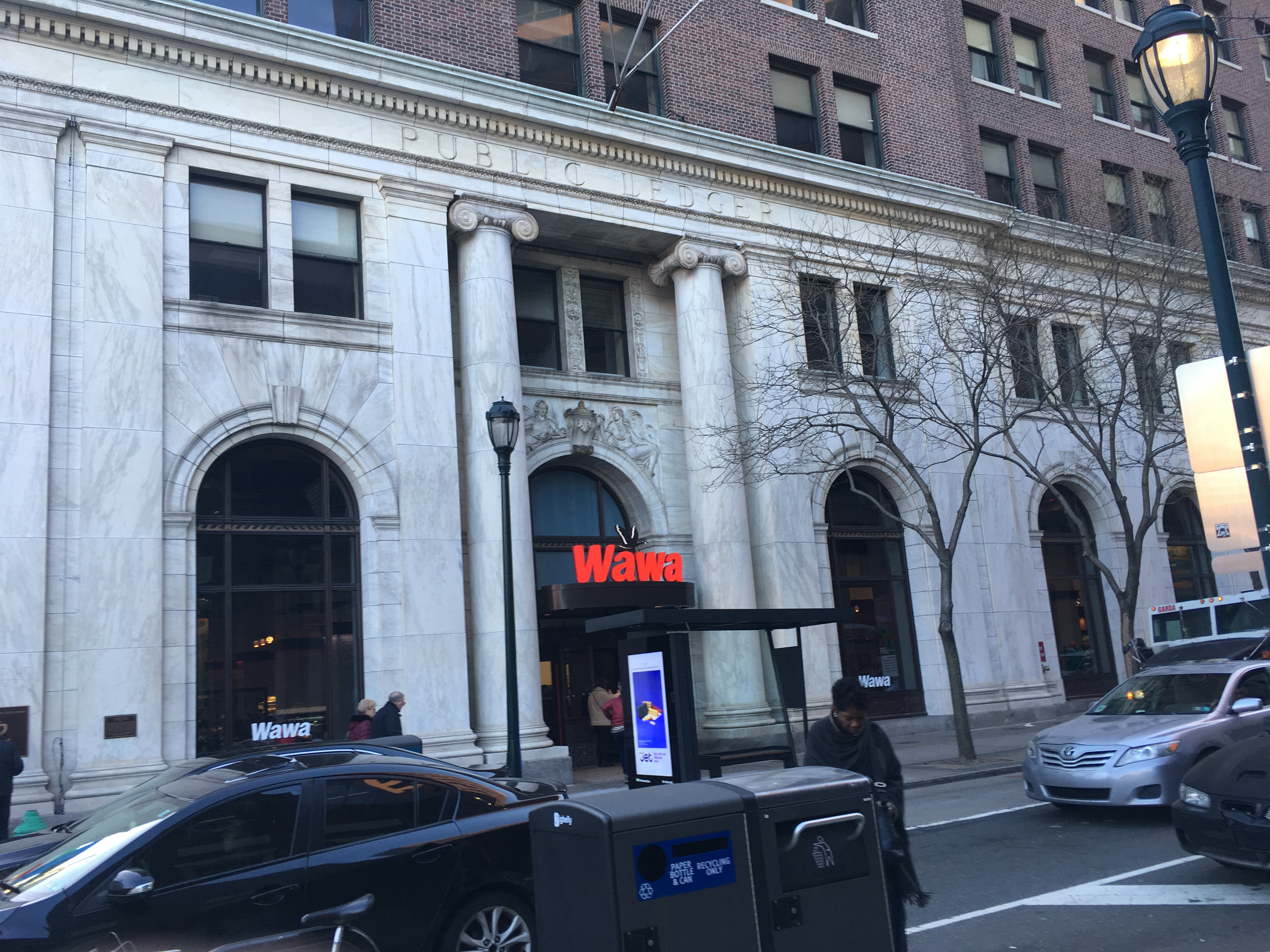
The largest Wawa store, at 6th Street and Chestnut Street in Philadelphia, Pennsylvania

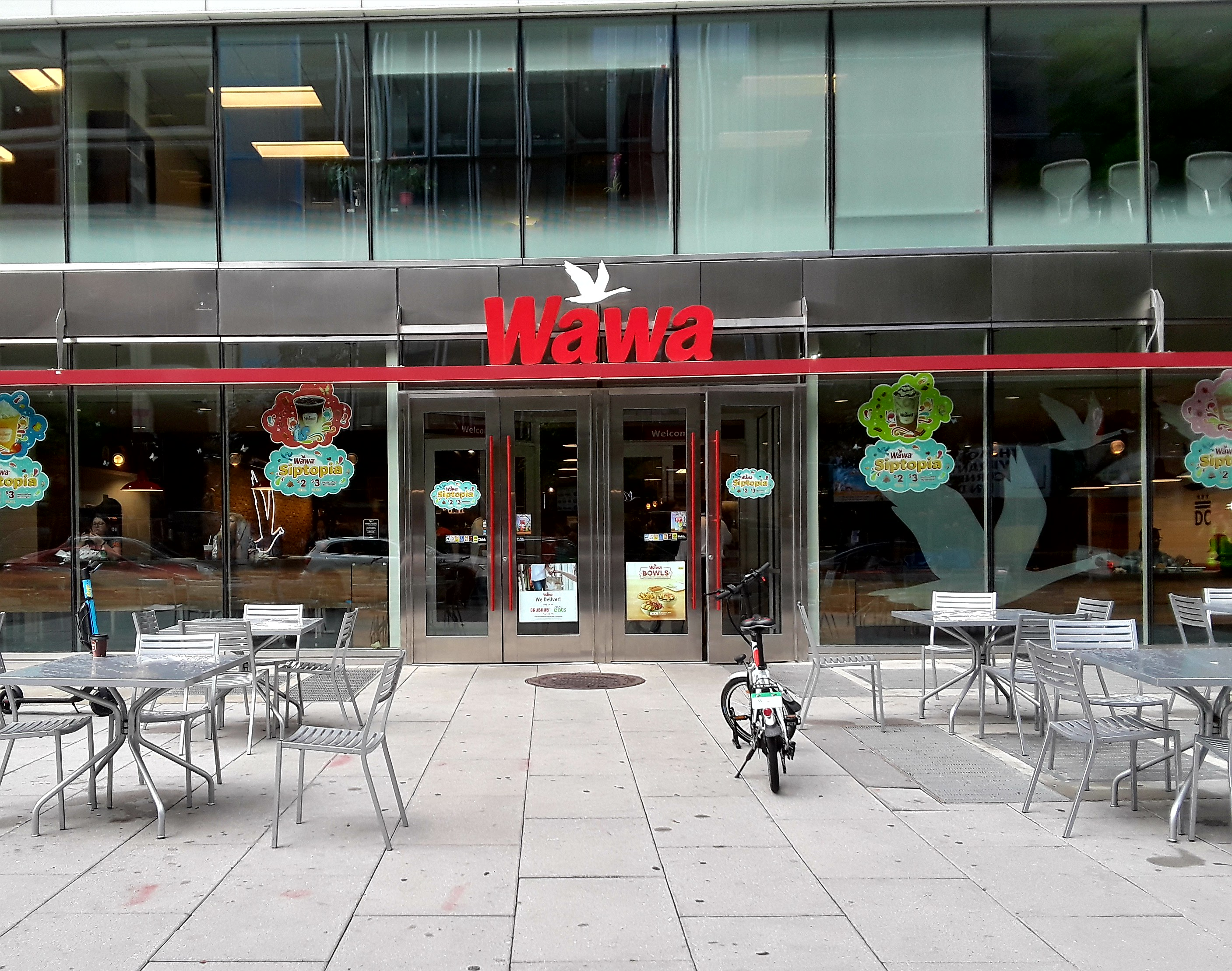
Location in the Farragut Square neighborhood of downtown Washington, D.C.

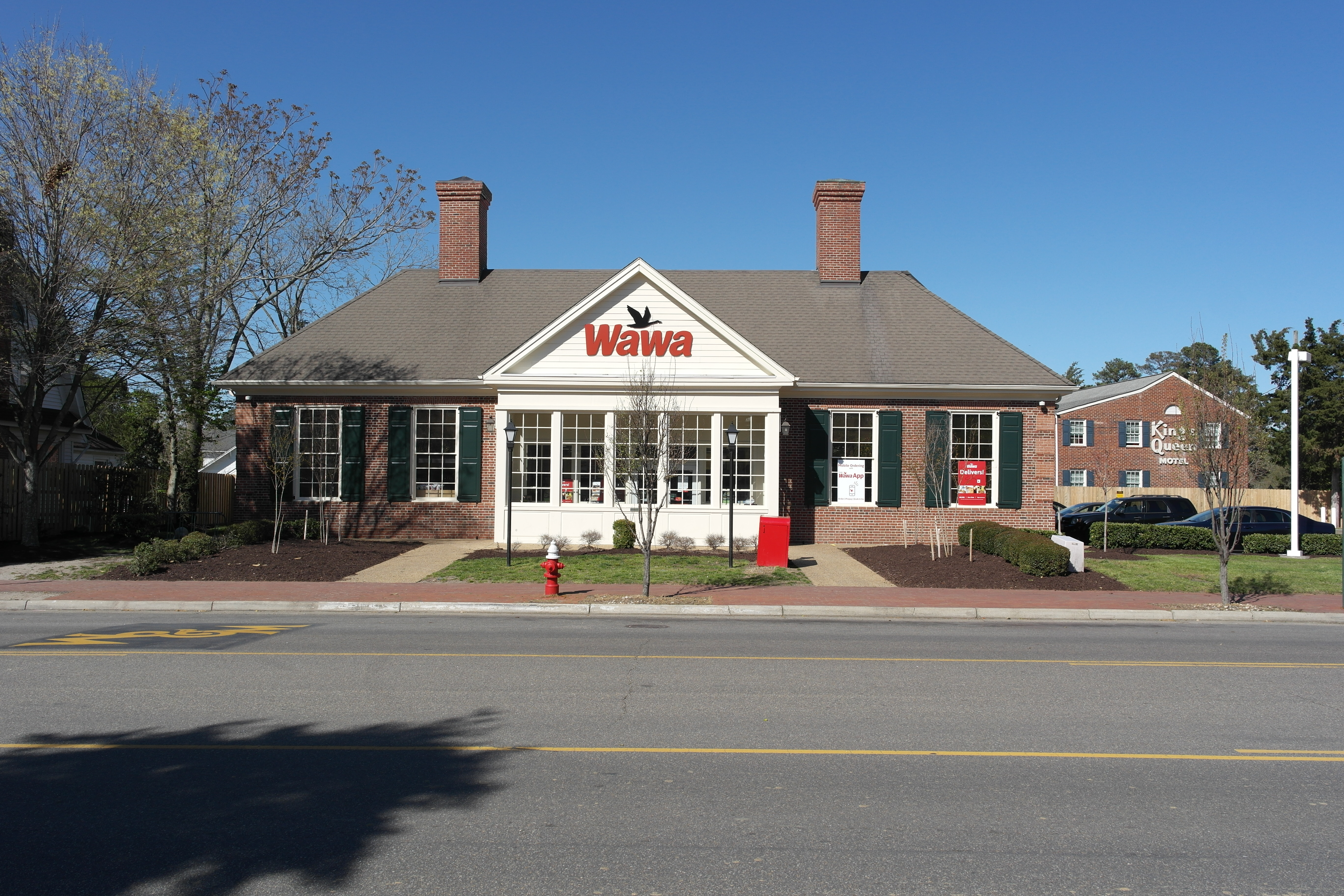
Wawa Food Market in Williamsburg, Virginia across from College of William & Mary. This was the first location built on the Virginia Peninsula.

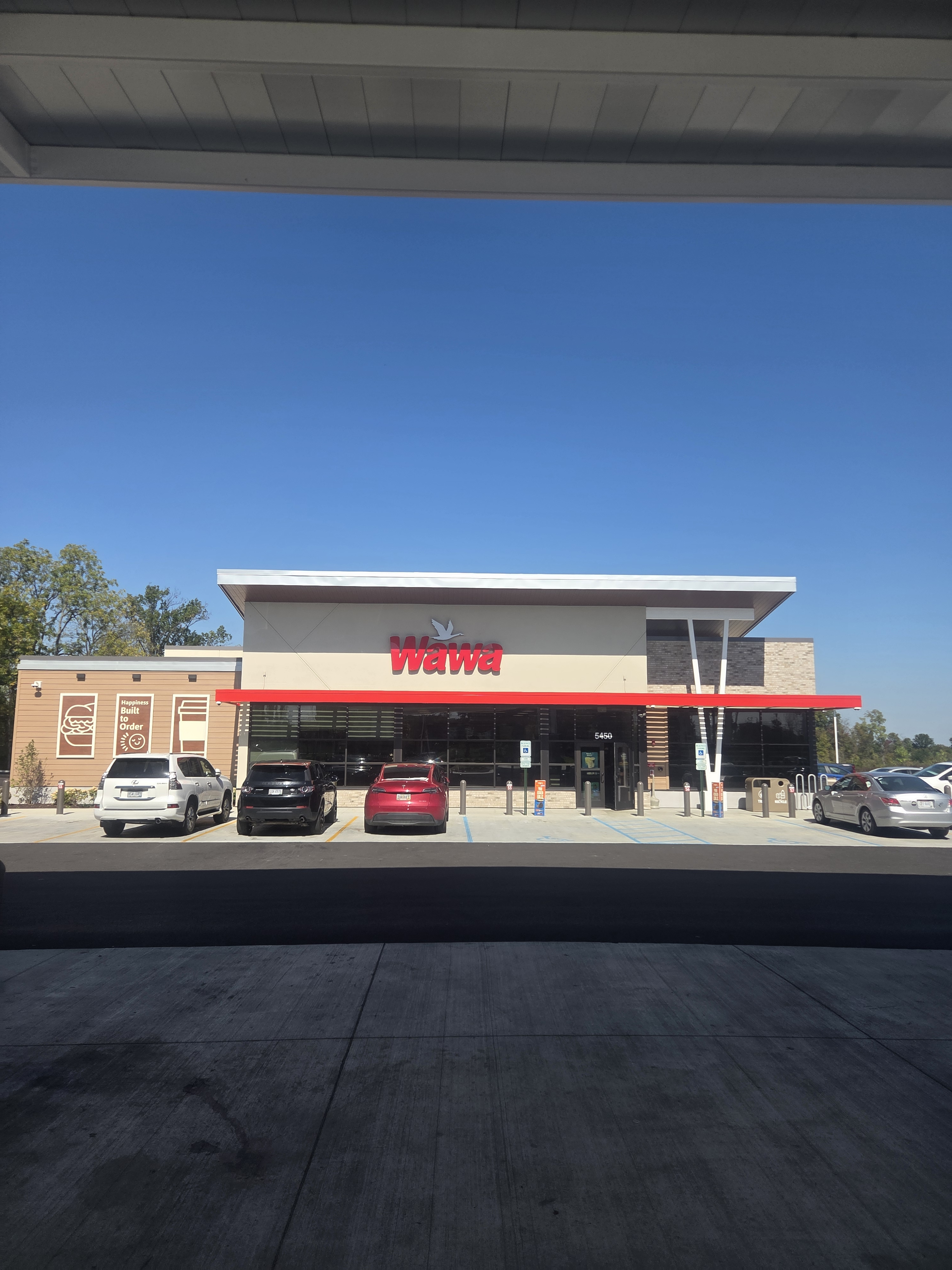
Wawa location in Mason, Ohio in 2025, near Kings Island

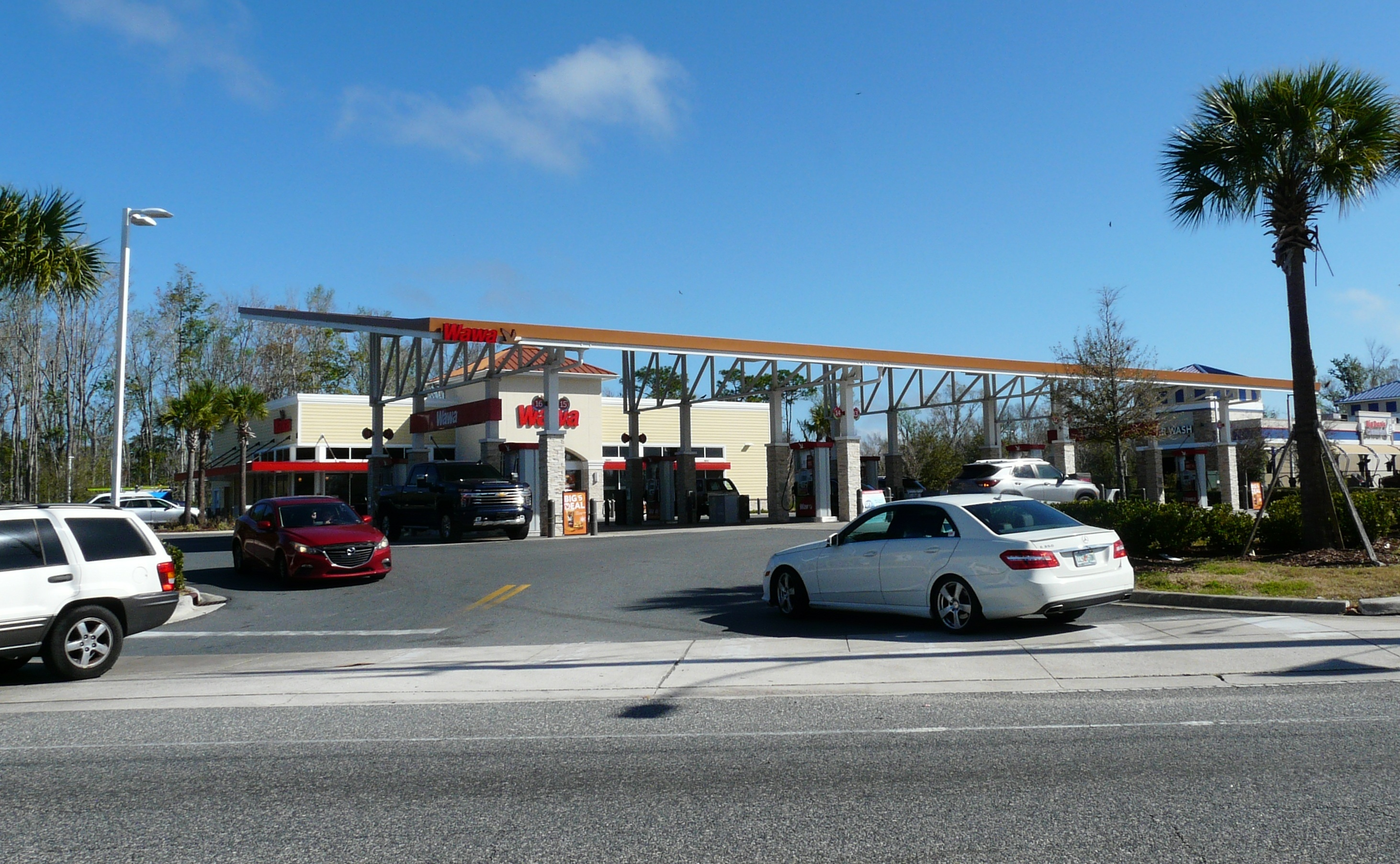
Wawa in Crystal River, Florida in 2026

Wawa grand opening in Crawfordville, Florida

== Competitors ==
Wawa, for the most part, covers parts of Pennsylvania not already served by rival stores such as Sheetz, which Wawa is often compared to due to their similar business models and Pennsylvania roots. This led to a "rivalry" between the two chains among Pennsylvanians, though the two companies themselves have a friendly relationship. The character of the two chains has been described as, "Sheetz is typically louder and flashier, with a more intense vibe than Wawa's unassuming, plain and simple appearance. ... But while Sheetz may seem like it has more options, Wawa reminds us that no matter how you are dressed, you are welcome there." Despite the rivalry, the two stores generally do not compete head-to-head in Pennsylvania, with only a few small overlapping areas in the eastern part of the state served by both chains. In Virginia, both chains share a market in the Greater Richmond and Northern Virginia regions. Wawa's planned expansion into South Central Pennsylvania and North Carolina will see more head-to-head competition from both chains, enough where Sheetz subsequently announced more store locations in Western Pennsylvania (where GetGo, 7-Eleven/Speedway, Circle K, and locally based Coen Markets are competitors) to fend off a potential expansion of Wawa into the Pittsburgh market. Maryland-based Royal Farms also shares a market with Wawa in several Mid-Atlantic states.

As of October 2024, according to a survey done by the American Customer Satisfaction Index, Wawa received higher marks in customer satisfaction compared to Sheetz.

== Data breach ==
On December 20, 2019, Wawa's CEO Chris Gheysens announced that the company had found malicious software on its payment processing servers that affected every location across the country, according to the statement. The malware is believed to have been on the servers since as early as March 4, 2019, and contained on December 12, 2019. It affected approximately 34 million cards.

On December 27, 2019, The Philadelphia Inquirer reported that at least six lawsuits seeking class-action status had been filed against the company in federal court in Philadelphia.

On July 26, 2022, Pennsylvania Attorney General Josh Shapiro announced an $8 million agreement with Wawa to resolve the data breach.

== Popularity ==
Wawa enjoys a level of popularity in the Greater Philadelphia region likened to a cult following. This has been attributed to its focus on service and by its fostering a sense of community, described as, "Somehow, whether because of the goofy name or the iconic Canada goose soaring in the sunset, Wawa succeeded in creating an atmosphere that intimately connects with a broad sense of community." Wawa CEO Chris Gheysens has attributed this to a slow-growth strategy, comparing Wawa's cult popularity with that of stores with similar strategies, such as In-N-Out Burger.

== Controversies ==
Wawa's expansion efforts have sometimes met with controversy from local communities. In Coral Gables, Florida, land which was planned to be used for affordable housing was instead approved as a new site for a Wawa gas station.
