= Forge Hill =

Historic house in Pennsylvania, United States

- U.S. National Register of Historic Places
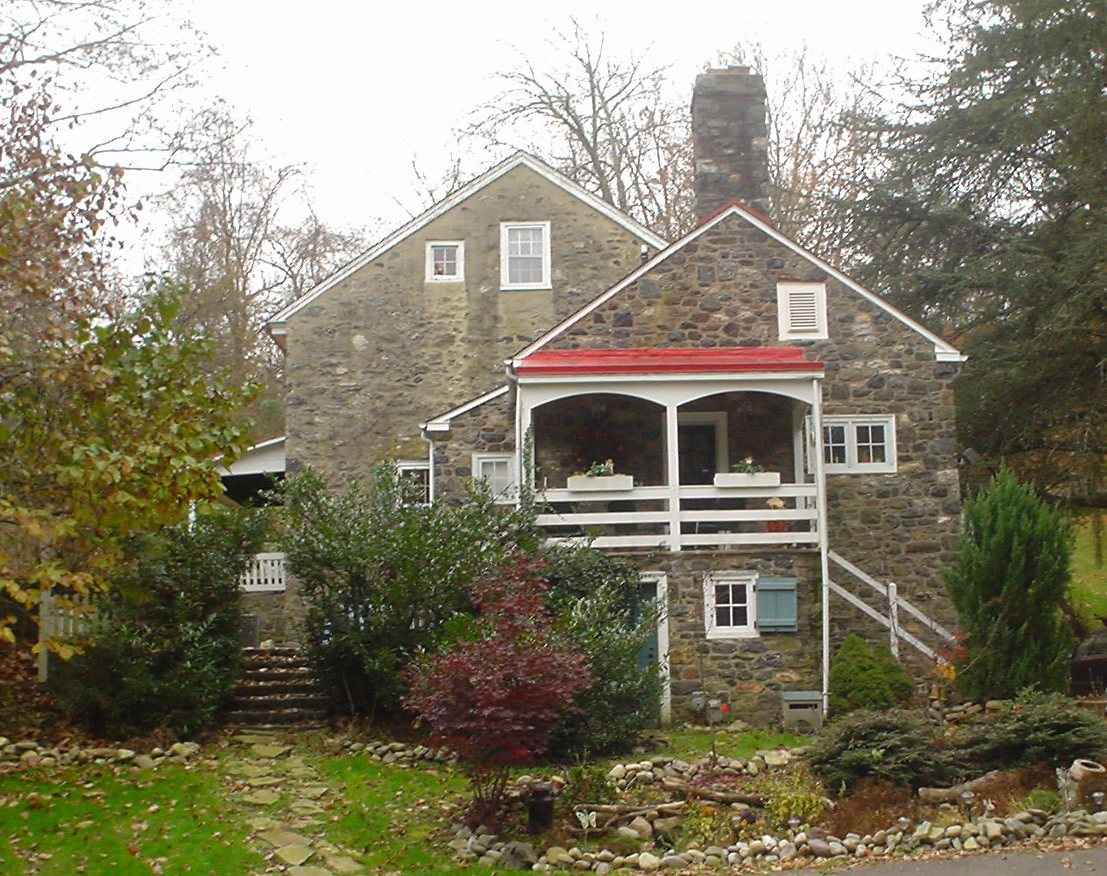
- Photo is of gatehouse "Little Forge Hill," November 2009

- Location within Pennsylvania Location within the United States
- Location: Off U.S. 1, Wawa, Pennsylvania
- Coordinates: 39°54′2″N 75°27′48″W
- Area: 5.5 acres (2.2 ha)
- Built: 1798-1800
- NRHP reference No.: 73001627
- Added to NRHP: March 7, 1973

Forge Hill is a historic home located at Wawa, Delaware County, Pennsylvania. It was built between 1798 and 1800, and is a 2 1/2-story, fieldstone dwelling with a 1 1/2-story ell added in 1936, during a complete restoration.

It was added to the National Register of Historic Places on March 7, 1973.

== See also ==
- National Register of Historic Places listings in Delaware County, Pennsylvania
