= Wawa, Pennsylvania =

Unincorporated community in Pennsylvania, US

- Unincorporated community
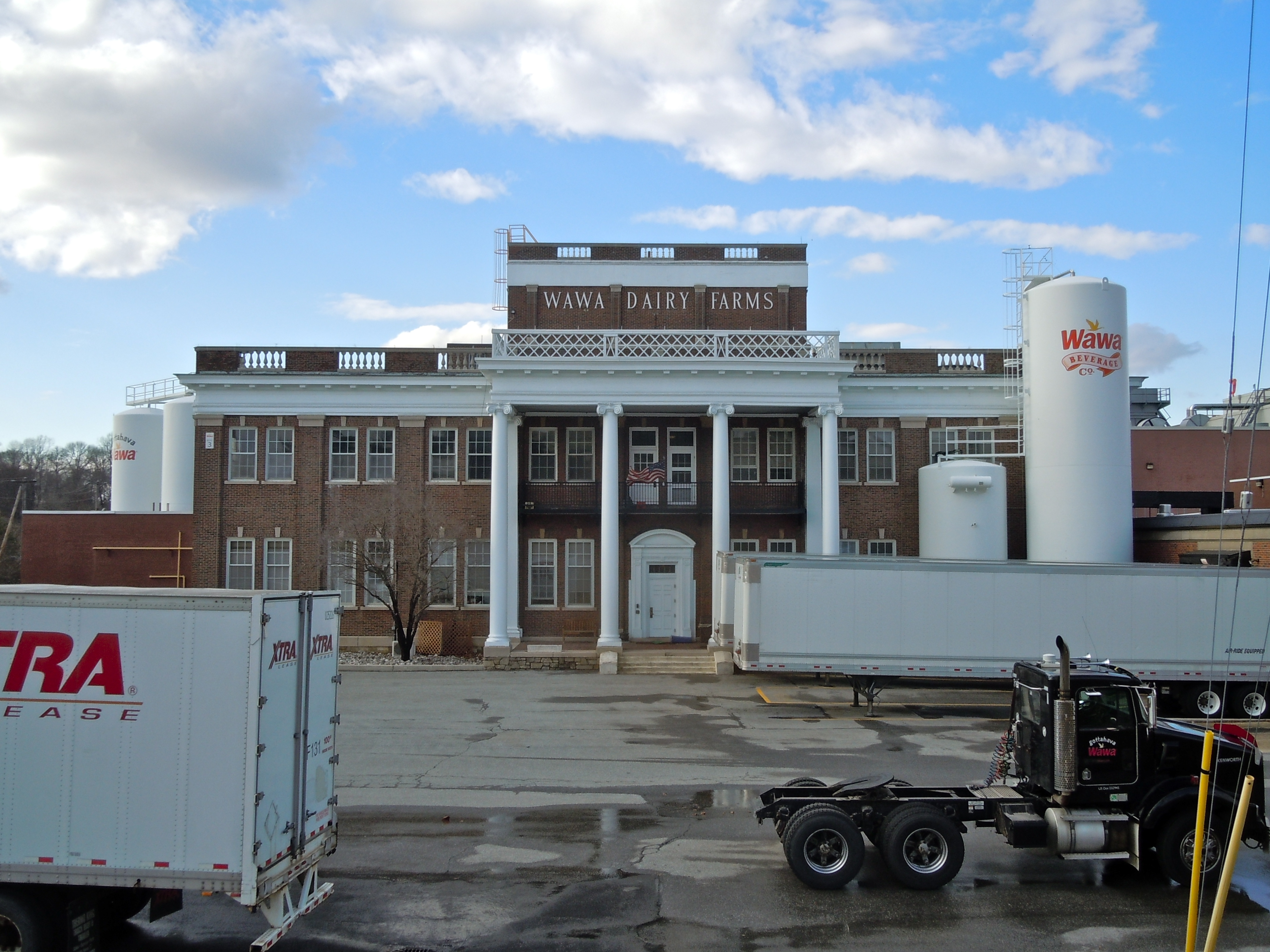
- The Wawa dairy building

- Location within the U.S. state of Pennsylvania Wawa (the United States)
- Coordinates: 39°54′06″N 75°27′35″W
- Country: United States
- State: Pennsylvania
- County: Delaware
- Borough: Chester Heights (partial)
- Township: Middletown Township (partial)
- Time zone: UTC-5 (Eastern (EST))
  - Summer (DST): UTC-4 (EDT)
- ZIP code: 19063
- Area codes: 610 and 484

Wawa is an unincorporated community located in Delaware County, in the U.S. state of Pennsylvania in Greater Philadelphia, partially in Middletown Township and partially in Chester Heights Borough.

== History ==
In the 1700s, people from Philadelphia and New Jersey settled Wawa due to the community's abundance of water. Various mills, including gristmills and paper mills, opened on area creeks. Wawa was originally known as Pennellton and Grubb's Bridge. When Edward Worth built an estate here, he named it "Wawa", the Ojibwe word for "wild goose", (Note: The word was popularized by Henry Wadsworth Longfellow's The Song of Hiawatha, published in 1855.) because of the flocks of geese attracted to the still water behind Lenni milldam. The name had been transferred to the town by 1884. Forge Hill was added to the National Register of Historic Places on March 7, 1973.

In 1989, Wawa Inc. announced that it planned to expand its Wawa dairy, which is located in Middletown Township. Walter Kirby, head of the Wawa Farms Association, alerted residents of the Wawa community, and they appeared in large numbers at a meeting. Kirby said that residents did not want the dairy to expand, but they preferred having a dairy to other types of development.

Cynthia Mayer of the Philadelphia Inquirer said in 1989 that there was an "...indignity of being from a town now associated with [a] convenience store. Unlike, say, Hershey, Pa.—or Wawa's cherished dairying past—outsiders now tend to associate Wawa with Cheetos, emergency toilet paper errands and Super Squeezers."

== Geography ==
Wawa is located in Delaware County, Pennsylvania, partially in Middletown Township and partially in Chester Heights Borough. Cynthia Mayer of the Philadelphia Inquirer said that Wawa "doesn't bother to conveniently contain itself within either municipality" because the community predates that of the county and both municipalities. As of 1989 Wawa has several open fields, various estates, the Wawa Inc. corporate headquarters, and what Mayer said was "what may be the last dairy farm in Delaware County." Mayer said that the dairy "gives Wawa its flavor" and, in 1989, it "both preserves Wawa as a neighborhood and threatens it, according to some residents."

Baltimore Pike splits Wawa into east and west sections. As of 1989, according to Mayer, "traffic clogs" Baltimore Pike.

=== Cityscape ===
Mayer said that open land "characterizes" the community and that Wawa overall is "quite simply, beautiful." She attributed the overall aesthetic to the Wawa Inc. dairy and the Wood family, which had a long history with the Wawa company. The houses within Wawa are mostly stone houses erected in the 18th century. Some houses are 19th-century wooden houses which have large porches. Mayer said that the roads, such as Valley Road and Wawa Road "are narrow and winding and take you through dappled woods, only occasionally interrupted by a house." Mayer said that many residents lived on acres formerly occupied by Wawa farmland. In 1989 Walter Kirby, the head of the Wawa Farms Association, recalled that the Wawa dairy began selling 5-acre (2.0 ha) lots of what was its farmland beginning in 1940. In 1989 Kirby said, as paraphrased by Mayer, that "Wawa residents are both grateful to the dairy and wary of its success" because they "realize Wawa has remained a pocket of green space because the Wood family owns so much land."

=== Boundaries ===
In 1989 Mayer said that "In fact, the most remarkable thing about Wawa [...] is that no one can agree on where it is, really. It is a place where a lot of people would like to live, and so a lot say they do. But ask them where the boundaries of Wawa are, and, well...." W. Bruce Clark, the manager of Middletown Township, said that "No one's ever drawn a line on a map saying this is where Wawa begins and ends." Fritz Schroeder, the vice president of Wawa Inc. and a resident of Wawa, said "Wawa is a state of mind. If you want to be in Wawa, you can be in Wawa." In 1989 Mayer said that many residents, including Walter Kirby, the head of the Wawa Farms Association, said that because they lived on land formerly occupied by cows, they lived in Wawa.

== Demographics ==
According to Cynthia Mayer of the Philadelphia Inquirer, as of 1989, population estimates ranged from five families to 265 families. Mayer said that "one longtime resident on Wawa Road" estimated that it was five families, while 68-year-old Walter Kirby, the head of the Wawa Farms Association, estimated that it was 265 families.

== Transportation ==
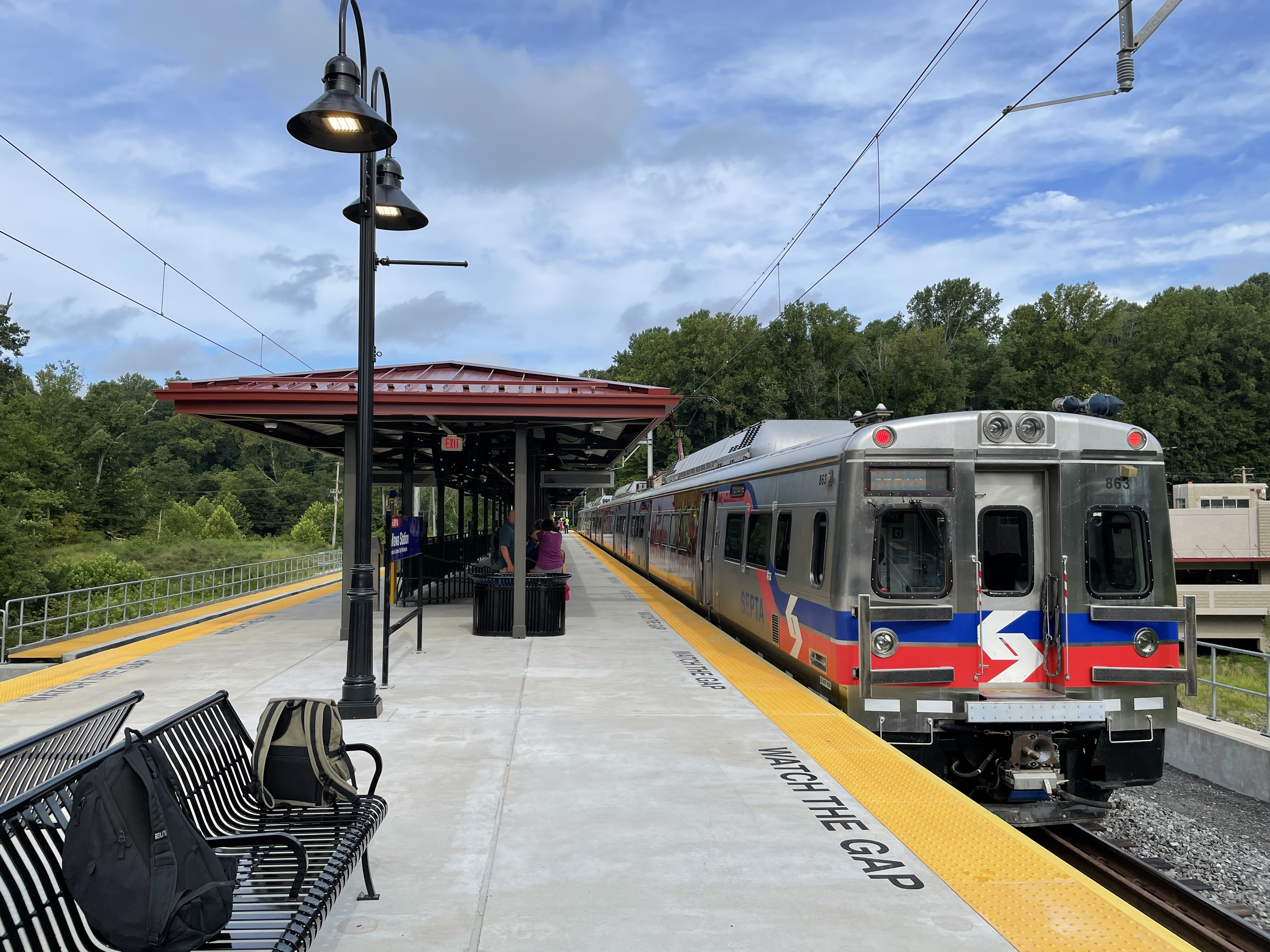
Wawa Station

Wawa is the location of Wawa Station, which serves as the terminus of SEPTA's Media/Wawa Line. The Wawa train station and junction served the Pennsylvania Railroad's (PRR) three branch lines:

1. West Chester Branch, now the SEPTA Media/Wawa Line. Service was inactive west of Elwyn from 1986 to 2022, when service was restored to Wawa.
2. Chester Creek Branch. PRR's successor Penn Central ended train service in 1971, following damage to the line from severe storms in both 1971 and 1972. SEPTA currently owns the right of way, and the railroad bed was converted into a paved trail.
3. Octoraro Branch. Penn Central ended service in 1971 between Wawa and Chadds Ford, following damage to the line from the same severe storms described above. SEPTA owns the right-of-way and sold the section south of Chadds Ford to the East Penn Railroad, a short-line freight railroad.

The SEPTA rail service to Wawa ended in September 1986. Cynthia Mayer of the Philadelphia Inquirer said that resulted in "a meaningless station stop sign at the end of a flooded dirt road." SEPTA rail service was restored to a rebuilt Wawa station on August 21, 2022.

== Economy ==
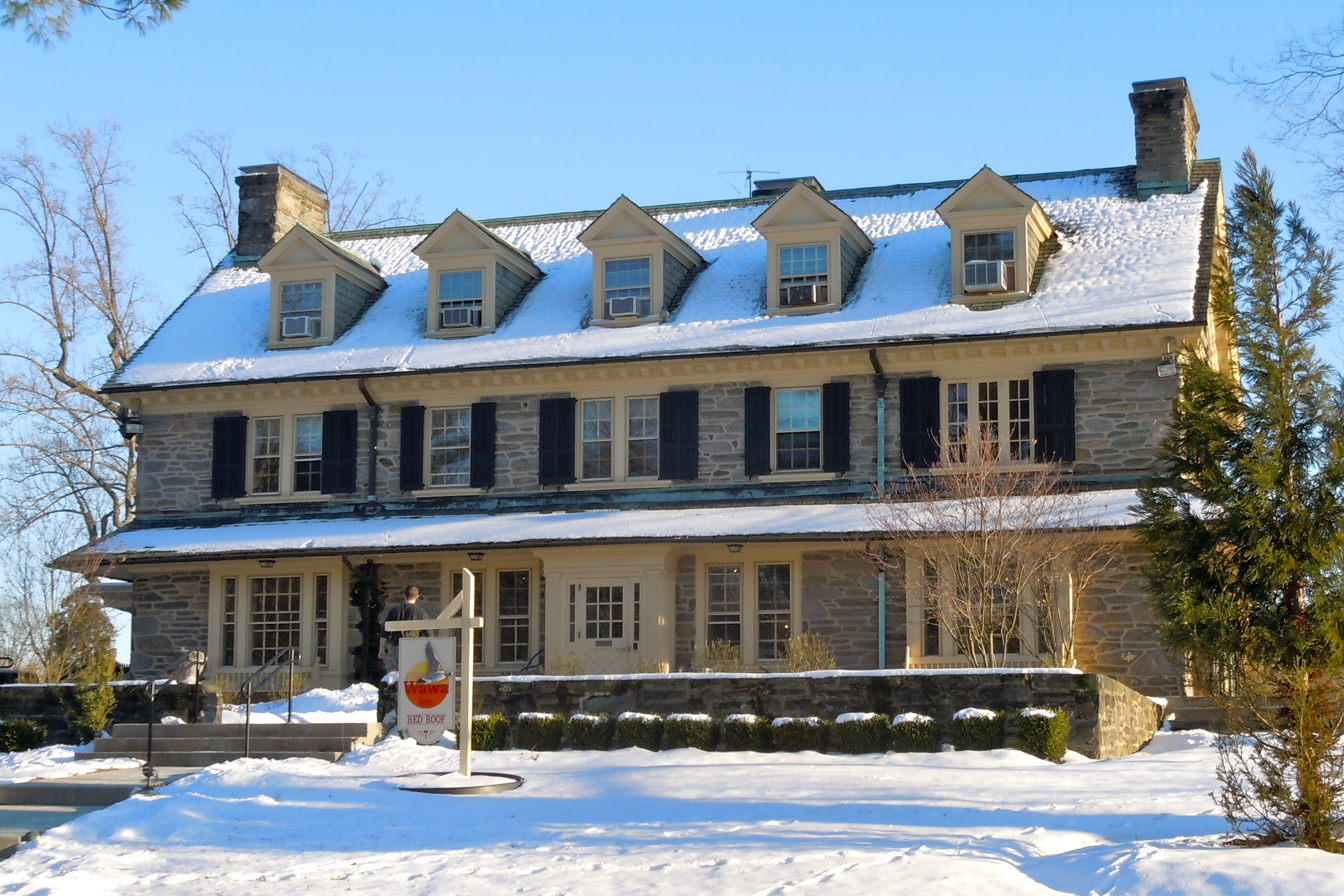
"Red Roof" at Wawa headquarters in the portion of Wawa in Chester Heights, Pennsylvania

The headquarters of Wawa Food Markets is located in the portion of Wawa in Chester Heights. As of 2011 about 300 employees work in the headquarters. The Borough of Chester Heights receives a majority of its local services tax from employees of Wawa Inc.

The previous Franklin Mint site was in Middletown Township. Cynthia Mayer of the Philadelphia Inquirer said in 1989 that "Some people also say [Wawa] is home to the Franklin Mint, but the mint has named its immediate environs Franklin Center—a slap in the face to Wawa, perhaps, but mint officials say it is really just a matter of convenience, considering the volume of mail they receive." Since then the Franklin Mint had relocated.

== Government and infrastructure ==
In 1989 Bruce Clark, the manager of Middletown Township, said that the township, as paraphrased by Cynthia Mayer of the Philadelphia Inquirer, "doesn't really recognize Wawa as anything more than a neighborhood."

As of 1989 the Media, Pennsylvania United States Postal Service post office serves Wawa. According to Ron Lincoln, an employee of the Media Post Office as of 1989, the previous post office that served Wawa, Darling Post Office, closed in 1973 or 1974. In 1989 Lincoln said that many residents write "Wawa, Pennsylvania" as their return addresses, and particularly older residents have this habit. Lincoln said in 1989 that sometimes the Media Post Office sometimes stamps letters asking for residents to "Please notify correspondent of your correct address" but that the tactic rarely is successful. During the same year, Linda Del Piano, another Media Post Office employee, said "It's like a sore point with them. They don't want to change. There is no Wawa, Pa."

== Education ==
The borough of Chester Heights is in the Garnet Valley School District, while Middletown Township is in the Rose Tree Media School District.
