= Chris Gheysens =

American businessman (born 1971)

- Born: March 31, 1971 (age 55); Vineland, New Jersey, U.S.
- Occupation: Businessman
- Known for: President & CEO of Wawa Inc.

Chris Gheysens (born March 31, 1971) is an American businessman who serves as the President and Chief Executive Officer of Wawa Inc., a privately held chain of convenience store and gas stations with over 1000 locations along the East Coast of the United States.

He grew up in Vineland, New Jersey and worked in his youth at car washes that his father owned. He attended St. Mary School in East Vineland and then moved on to St. Augustine Preparatory School in Richland, New Jersey, graduating in 1989. After earning a B.S. in accounting from Villanova University in 1993, Gheysens earned an M.B.A. from Saint Joseph's University in 2005.

== Career ==
Gheysens worked for four years as an auditor in the Philadelphia office of Deloitte.

Gheysens was hired by Wawa in 1997 and was named to serve as the company's chief financial officer and chief administrative officer in 2007. In 2012, he was named as Wawa's president and became the chief financial officer in January 2013, after a 16-month-long transition from his predecessor, Howard Stoeckel. He is identified on his business card as "Lead Goose", a riff on the company's logo of a flying goose, a title that he describes as fitting in with the loose corporate culture at Wawa. Gheysens has overseen an extensive remodeling project for the company's stores to establish a "warmer tone" for customers, rollout of a mobile app and expansion into North Jersey and Florida.

At the Villanova School of Business, Gheysens is a member of the dean's advisory committee. He has also been active with the Southeastern Pennsylvania Chapter of the American Red Cross. In September 2013, Gheysens was named to serve a three-year term on the Economic Advisory Council of the Federal Reserve Bank of Philadelphia. In October 2013, he was one of four members added as retail members serving on the board of directors of the National Association of Convenience Stores.

Gheysens traveled to Rome in 2015 as part of a delegation coordinating aspects of the papal visit to Philadelphia as part of Pope Francis's 2015 visit to North America. As one of the corporate sponsors of the World Meeting of Families, Wawa was contributing one million bottles of water for those participating at the event.

He lived in Washington Township, Gloucester County, New Jersey before moving to Moorestown, New Jersey with his wife and four children.
