= Wallingford station (SEPTA) =

Railway station in Wallingford, Pennsylvania

Wallingford
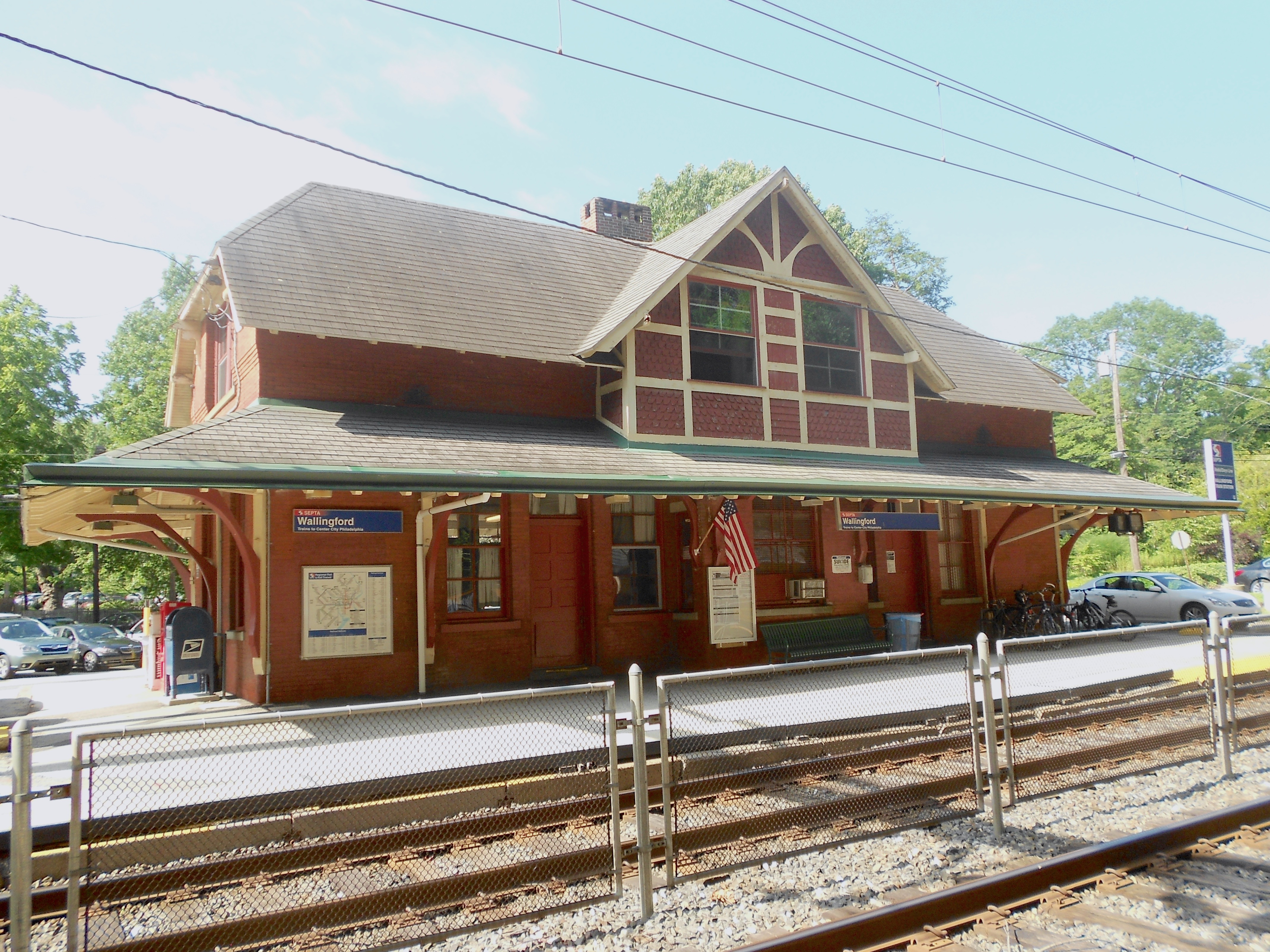
- View from outbound platform

General information
- Location: 141 East Possum Hollow Road; Wallingford, Pennsylvania
- Coordinates: 39.90362°N 75.37165°W
- Owner: SEPTA
- Platforms: 2 side platforms
- Tracks: 2

Construction
- Parking: 61 spaces
- Cycle facilities: Yes
- Accessible: No

Other information
- Fare zone: 3

History
- Rebuilt: 1880 or 1890
- Electrified: December 2, 1928

Passengers
- 2017: 280 boardings 287 alightings (weekday average)
- Rank: 94 of 146

Services
Preceding station	SEPTA	Following station
Moylan–Rose Valley toward Wawa Station	Media/Wawa Line	Swarthmore toward Temple University
Former services
Preceding station	Pennsylvania Railroad	Following station
Moylan–Rose Valley toward West Chester	West Chester Line	Swarthmore toward Suburban Station
Location

Wallingford station is a SEPTA Regional Rail station in Wallingford, Pennsylvania. Located at Kershaw Road and Possum Hollow Road, it serves the Media/Wawa Line. In 2017, this station saw 280 boardings and 287 alightings on an average weekday. It is in Nether Providence Township.

The station was established by the Pennsylvania Railroad. In 1855, when the rail line was extended to Media through Wallingford, passing and freight sidings were built at the location. The present station was built in 1890 by contractor Charles R. Kohl and Bros. While often attributed to architect Frank Furness, whose brother lived nearby, the station is based on a standard Pennsylvania Railroad plan designed by W. Bleddyn Powell. Other examples of the design were built in locations including Schuylkill Haven, Hamburg, Holmesburg Junction, Wissinoming, and Wilmerding, among others. For a time, this station also served as Wallingford's post office.

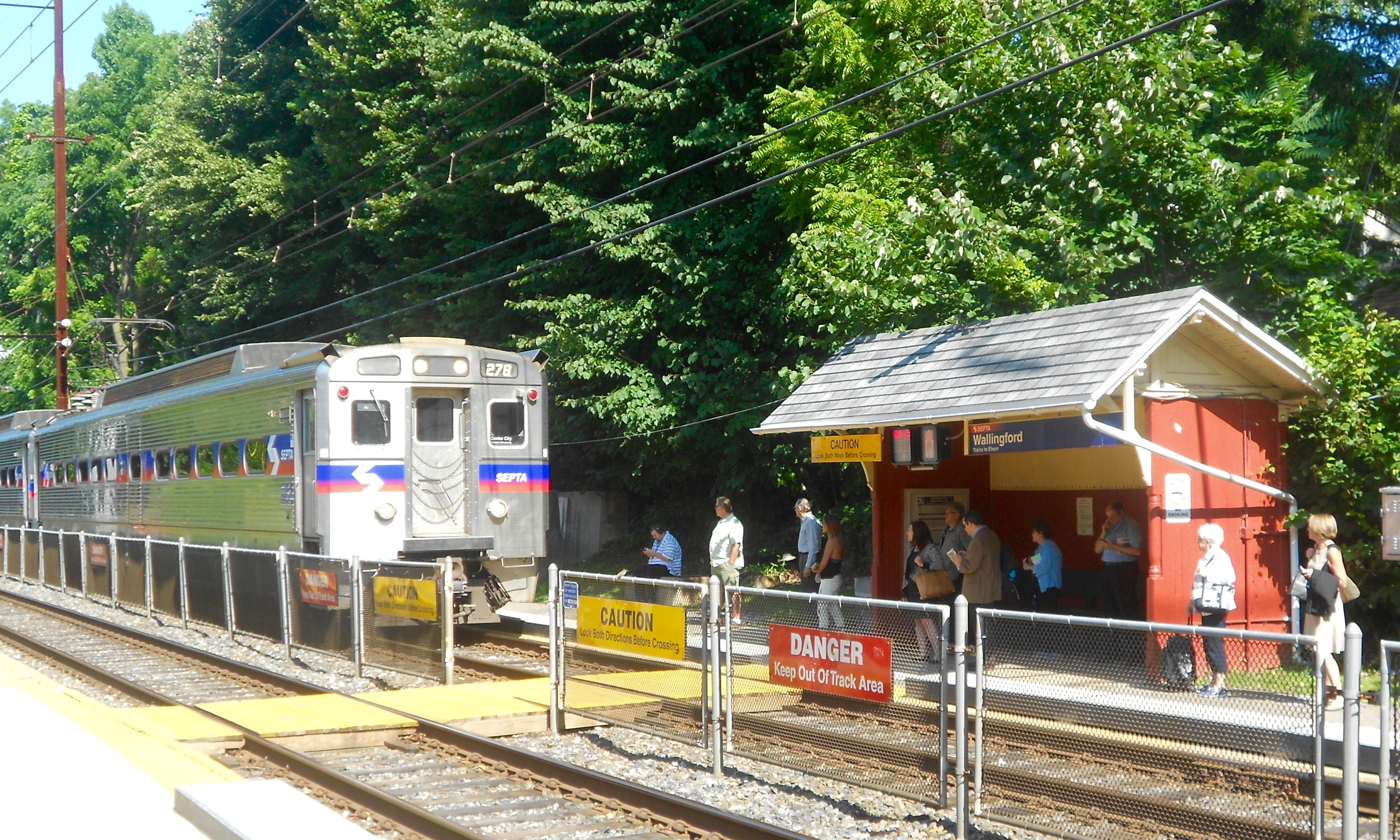
Inbound train on the outbound track during repairs in 2015

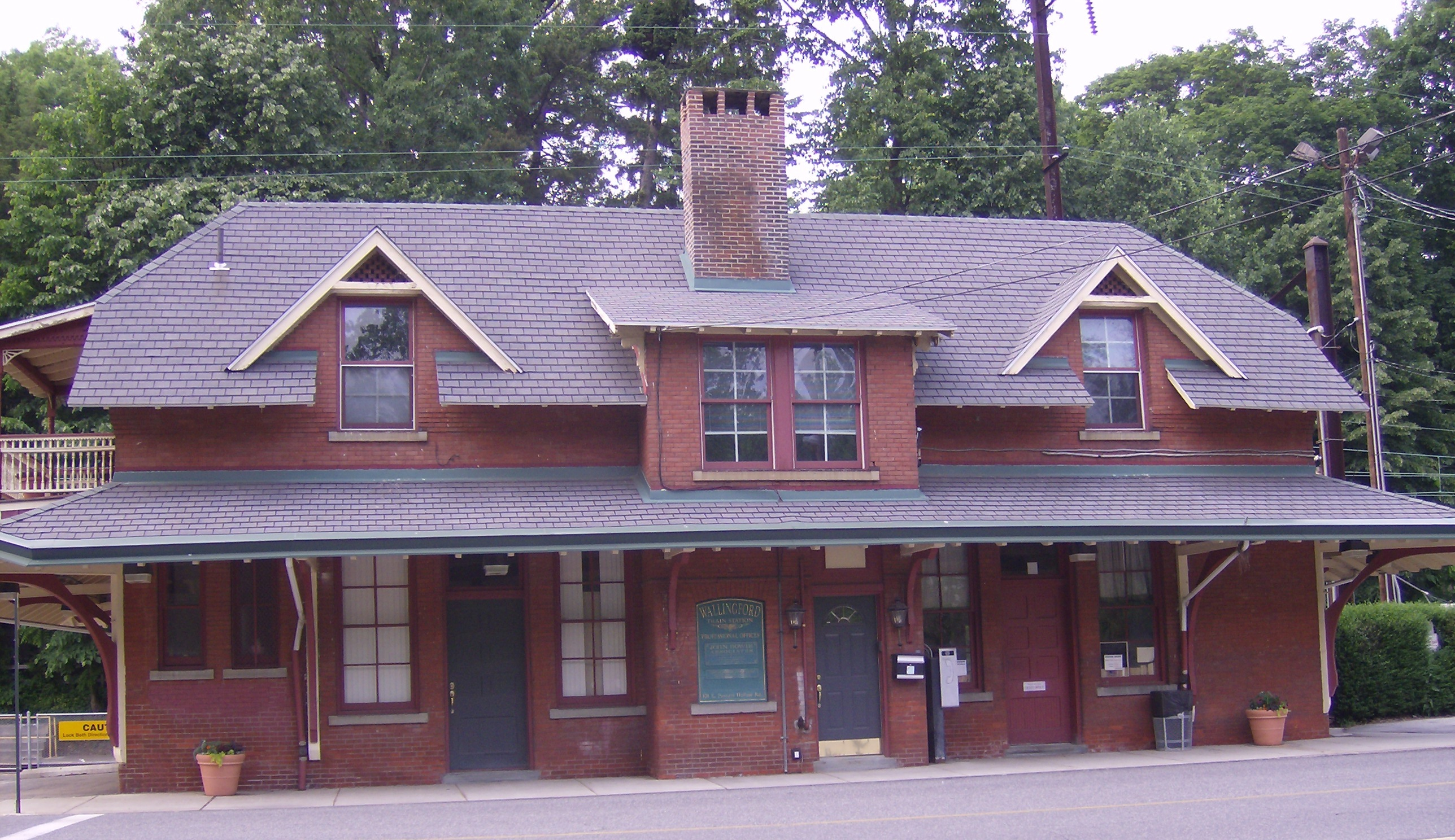
View from the parking lot

== Station layout ==
Wallingford has two low-level side platforms with a connecting pathway across the tracks.
