= Moylan–Rose Valley station =

SEPTA station in Nether Providence Township, Pennsylvania

Moylan–Rose Valley
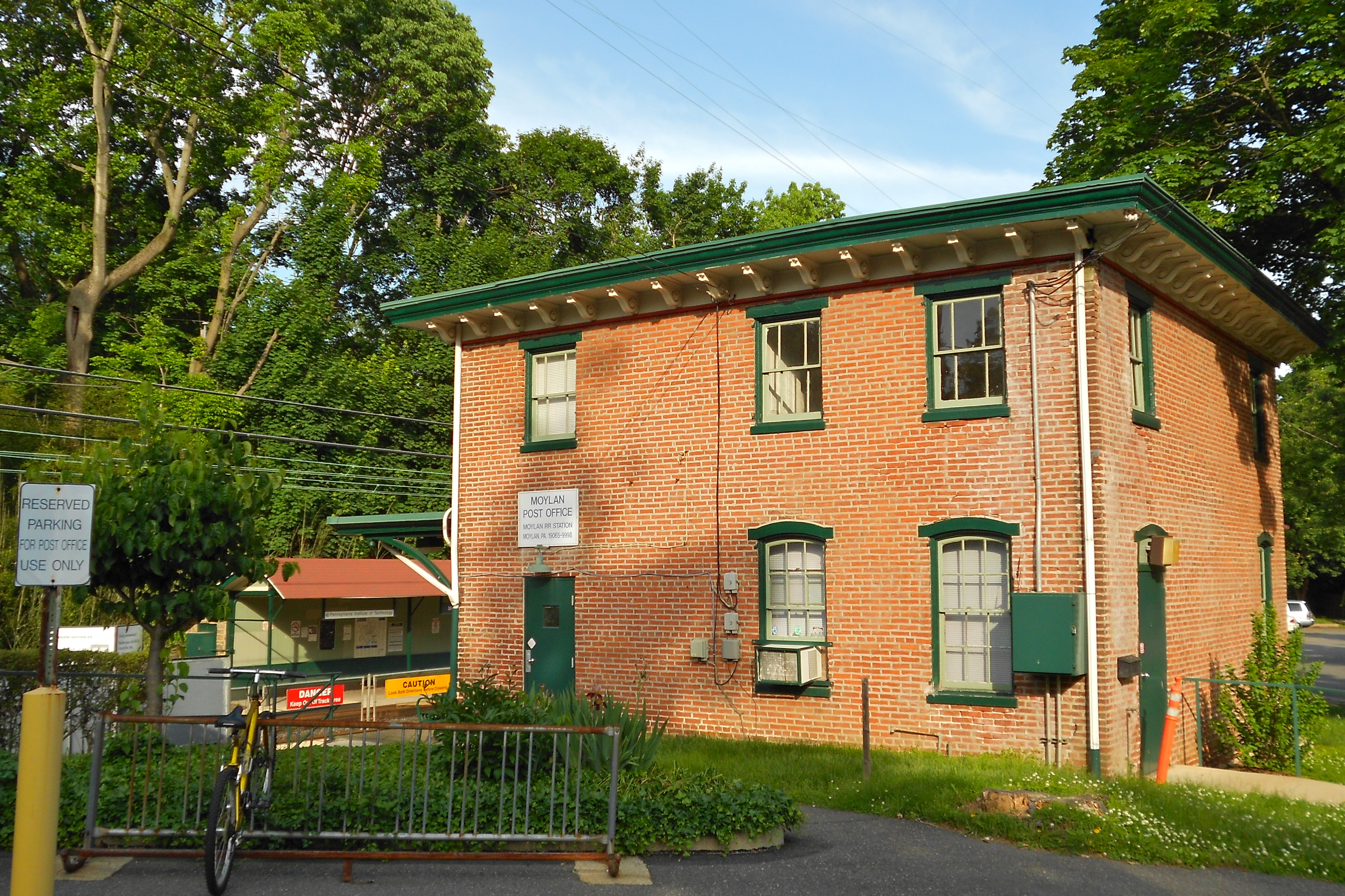

General information
- Location: 4 Manchester Road; Nether Providence Township, Pennsylvania
- Coordinates: 39.9058°N 75.3882°W
- Owner: SEPTA
- Platforms: 2 side platforms
- Tracks: 2

Construction
- Parking: 149 spaces
- Accessible: No

Other information
- Fare zone: 3

History
- Opened: 1870
- Electrified: December 2, 1928
- Former names: Manchester; Moylan

Passengers
- 486 (average weekday)

Services
Preceding station	SEPTA	Following station
Media toward Wawa Station	Media/Wawa Line	Wallingford toward Temple University
Former services
Preceding station	Pennsylvania Railroad	Following station
Media toward West Chester	West Chester Line	Wallingford toward Suburban Station
Location

Moylan–Rose Valley station is a SEPTA Regional Rail station in Nether Providence Township, Pennsylvania. Located at 4 Manchester Road, it serves the Media/Wawa Line. The station has a 149-space parking lot and a post office at the station. The Pennsylvania Institute of Technology is about 100 yards north of the station.

== History ==
It is located near the communities of Media, Moylan, and Rose Valley. Originally known as Manchester, and later Moylan, the current name reflects its geographical location near those areas.

== Station layout ==
Moylan–Rose Valley has two low-level side platforms with a connecting pathway across the tracks.

== Gallery ==
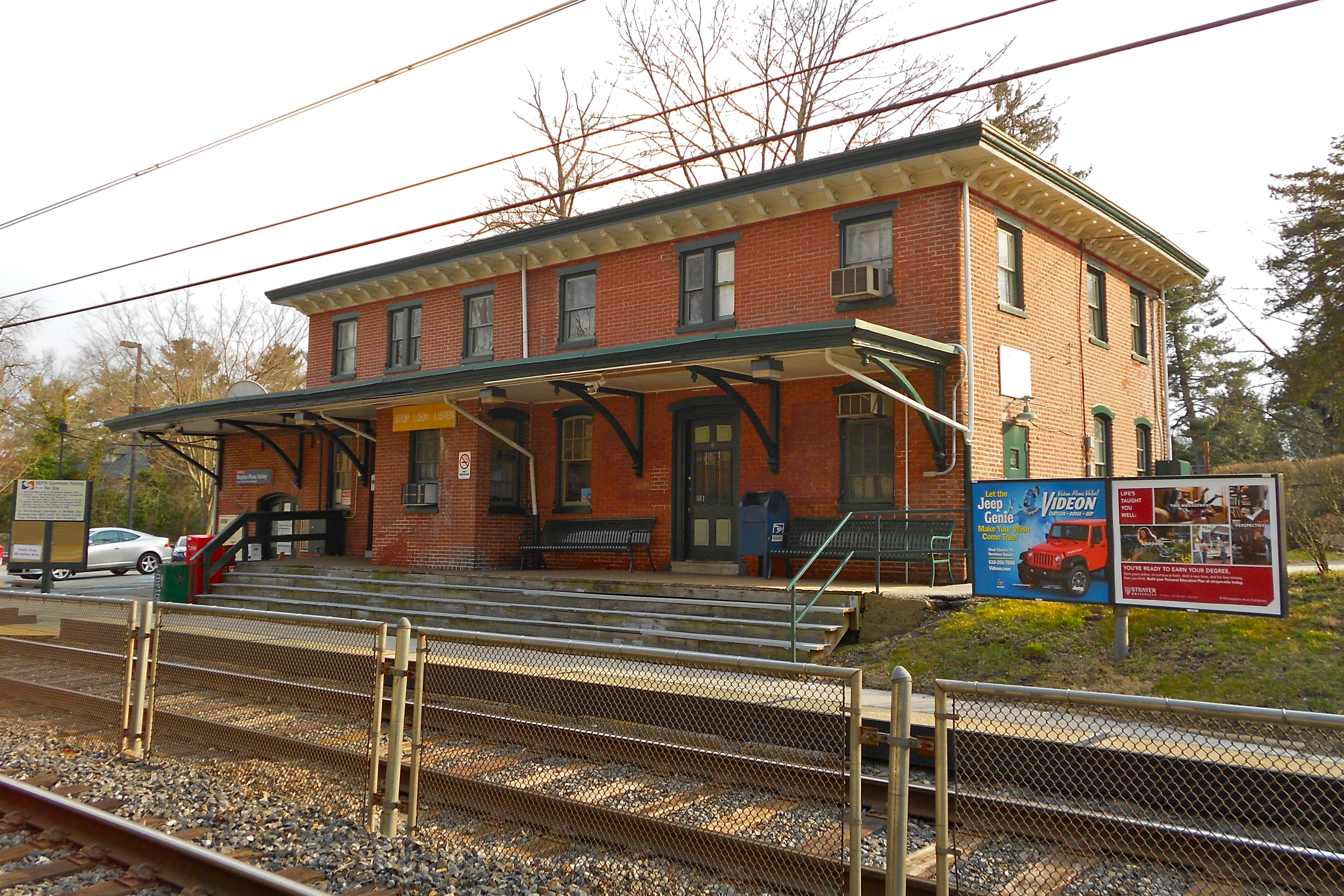
Eastbound (inbound) platform

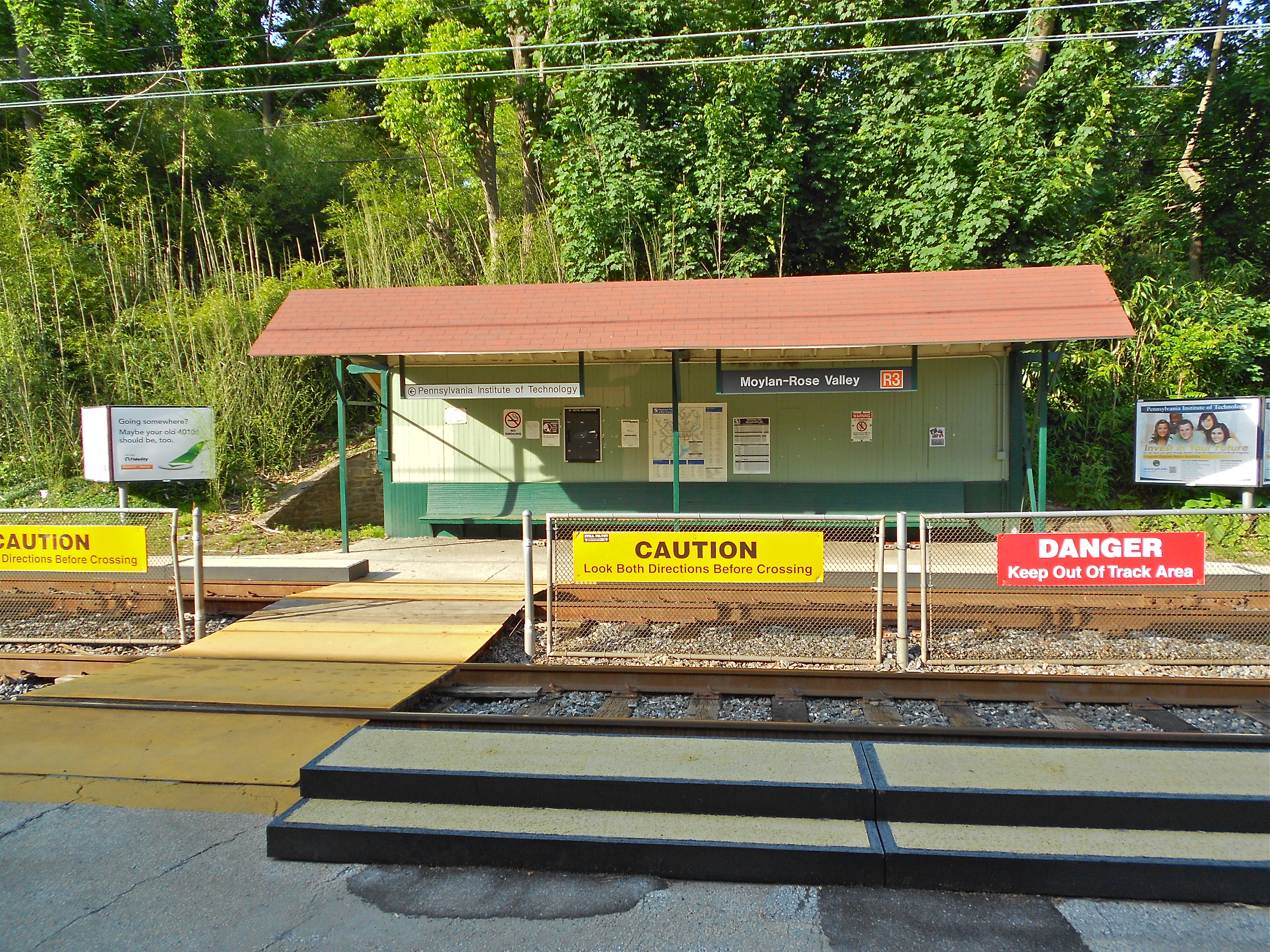
Westbound (outbound) shelter

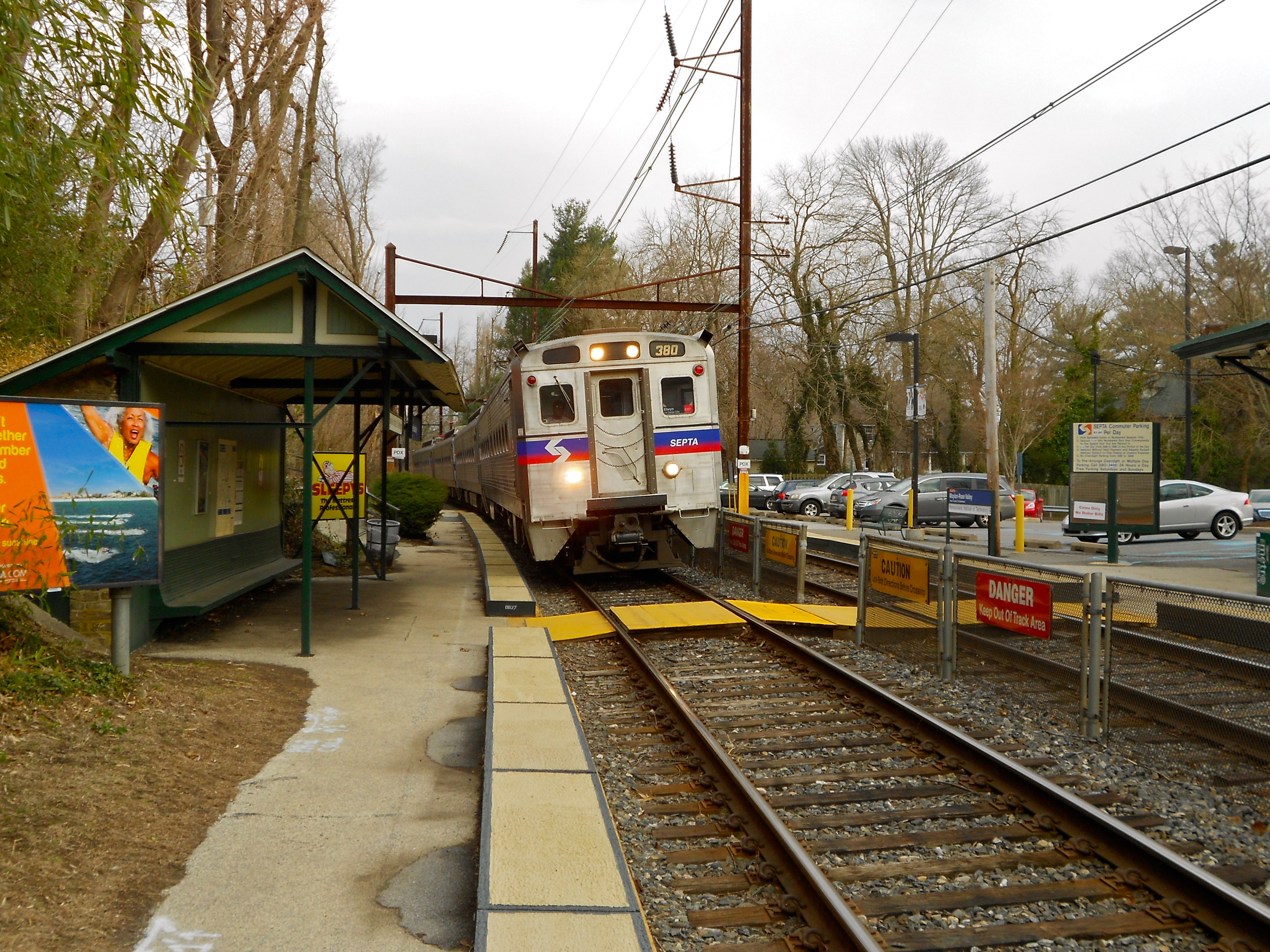
Train arriving from Philadelphia
