= Flexner =

Flexner is a surname. Notable people with the surname include:

- Anne Crawford Flexner (1874–1955), American playwright
- Abraham Flexner (1866–1959), American educator, author of the Flexner Report
- Bernard Flexner (1882–1946), New York lawyer, prominent member of the Zionist Organization of America
- Eleanor Flexner (1908–1995), independent scholar and pioneer in the field of women's studies
- James Thomas Flexner (1908–2003), prolific writer on American art history, wrote a four-volume biography of George Washington
- Jennie Maas Flexner (1882–1944), librarian and author
- Josefa B. Flexner (1903–2000), Spanish scientist
- Louis B. Flexner (1902–1996), American biochemist
- Simon Flexner (1863–1946), physician, scientist, administrator, and professor of experimental pathology at the University of Pennsylvania
- Stuart Berg Flexner (1928–1990), lexicographer, editor and author, noted for his books on the origins of American words and expressions

== See also ==
- Boies, Schiller & Flexner, American law firm founded by David Boies and Jonathan D. Schiller in 1997
- Flexner Report, book-length study of medical education in the United States and Canada written by Abraham Flexner, published in 1910
- Flexner-Wintersteiner rosette, a spoke and wheel shaped cell formation seen in retinoblastoma and certain other ophthalmic tumors
