= Jennie Maas Flexner =

American librarian and suffragist (1882–1944)

Jennie M. Flexner
- Born: November 6, 1882; Louisville, Kentucky, US
- Died: November 17, 1944 (aged 62); New York City, US
- Occupation: Librarian

Jennie Maas Flexner (November 6, 1882 – November 17, 1944) was a librarian, a suffragist and author.

== Life ==
Jennie Maas Flexner was born November 6, 1882, in Louisville, Kentucky to Jacob Aaron Flexner and Rosa Maas. Both her parents were of German-Jewish ancestry. She was the oldest of five children, with one brother and three sisters. Flexner and her siblings experienced a family life full of generous scholarly encouragements and educational backing. Her family was always very supportive and pushed her to pursue an education and develop a career that fit her personality and abilities.

She went to local public school and graduated from Commercial High School in Louisville at the age of 17. After graduating high school, she went to work for her uncle as a secretary. After that, she worked for The Louisville Herald. It was not until a conversation with her mother and a family friend, that Flexner was encouraged to try for a position at the new library in Louisville, which was funded by Andrew Carnegie. At this pivotal point in her life, Jennie Maas Flexner was introduced to a deep-rooted career in librarianship.

== Career ==
As a child, Flexner attended the local public school, however she did not finish college and did not attain a paying job until the age of twenty-four. At this time she began her career as a secretary at the Free Public Library of Louisville in 1903. She took a short leave of absence from the Louisville library in 1908, where she was able to study at the School of Library Service at the Western Reserve University in Cleveland. After her education, she would take her position as the circulation department's head from 1912 to 1928.

Flexner was a strong advocate and leading authority of the newly developing library concept of a reader-centered philosophy, as opposed to the traditional book centered library. She soon was at the forefront of writing and discussion for this topic.

Flexner was also known as a key innovator for libraries and their role and utilization of adult education, primarily for immigrants, minorities, and refugees during the Great Depression and World War II. She chaired a committee that selected books for the Armed Services and advised the council on books in wartime. When European refugees came to New York in the 1930s, she actively played a role in helping people find new resources for their professional and intellectual lives.

Flexner was also a strong advocate for the training and knowledge of the individuals working inside the library. In Louisville, she was an advocate of service to the black community and the training of black and white librarians. During her time as the circulation head at her hometown library in Louisville and as a result of her involvement in the professional education of librarians through expanding criteria and developing appropriate materials she wrote a book, "Circulation Work in Public Libraries," 1927, which became a standard text in library schools.

From 1928, until her death, Flexner was the Readers' advisory at the New York City Public Library and author of several books on the library and librarians. In 1926, she served on the curriculum staff of the American Library Association.

In 1928, she was chosen to initiate a special counseling service for adult readers at the New York Public Library from which they opened the Readers' Advisers Service Office, in 1929.

On January 15, 1938, Library Journal published the article titled “Readers and Books” written by Jennie M. Flexner. In this article she discusses what reader's advisory is and how this service provides readers with the opportunity and confidence to use the library. Here are some quotes from the above-mentioned article:

- “An effort is made to survey each reader’s relationship to books and make suggestions which will enable him to follow his own line of interest . . . .”
- “Finding this aid in selecting books effective and easily achieved, readers do return to talk over their problems, to ask for more books . . . .”

What is important about Flexner's article is that the readers’ advisory services can directly relate to a library's usage. Patrons are more likely to return when they have been met with success regarding queries in selecting materials pertinent to their desired tastes. Another important component to Flexner's reader's advisory, is the cooperation with a library's surrounding educational institutions. By keeping in contact with such institutions, libraries can equip themselves with either appropriate materials or a well-planned advisory list for students and participants to lectures and classes. Flexner ends her article with the following:

“The Readers’ Adviser in any library is there to help in the discovery of some of the pleasures which are to be found through familiarity with books, both old and new, and their use for self-development . . . .”

On November 17, 1944, she died in New York City. She was buried in The Temple Cemetery (also known as the Adath Israel Cemetery) in Louisville.

== Woman Suffrage Activism ==
Jennie Flexner followed in her parents' footsteps by joining the Louisville Woman Suffrage Association. She led the Legislative Committee in that club and also worked to organize the 1911 annual convention of the National American Woman Suffrage Association held in Louisville that year. She also served as the Press Superintendent of the Kentucky Equal Rights Association. When Kentucky women won the right to vote in local school board elections in 1912, Jennie and her sisters worked to get the vote out.

== Family ==
Jennie Flexner did not marry but was part of a distinguished family, including uncles Abraham Flexner, founder of the Institute for Advanced Study at Princeton, known for his studies and surveys of medical colleges, and Simon Flexner, known as a scientific director of the Rockefeller Foundation and eminent bacteriologist. A cousin, Abraham's daughter, the feminist writer Eleanor Flexner. Jennie's sisters were Hortense Flexner King, a poet and a teacher who published seven volumes at Bryn Mawr and Sarah Lawrence Colleges, and Caroline Flexner who became the aide to New York governor and senator Herbert H. Lehman, and held important positions in the Joint Distribution Committee and was with UNRRA in Washington, D.C. Her father, who helped finance his brothers' education, eventually was able to attain his own medical degree as a pharmacist and then a physician.

== Publications ==
- The Circulation of Books in Public Libraries 1926
- Circulation Work in Public Libraries 1927
- Making Books Work 1943

== Sources ==
- Halpert, Susan. "Jennie Maas Flexner." Jennie Maas Flexner at Jewish Women's Archive. Accessed April 2, 2009
- Brody, Seymour. "Jennie Maas Flexner: Reader's Adviser, Librarian & Author." Jennie Maas Flexner at FAU Libraries Special Collections & Archives Accessed April 3, 2009
- Edge, Sigrid A "Flexner, Jennie Maas" Notable American Women. Vol. 1, 4th ed., The Belknap Press of Harvard University Press, 1975
