= Hermann Weyl =

German mathematician (1885–1955)

Hermann Weyl ForMemRS
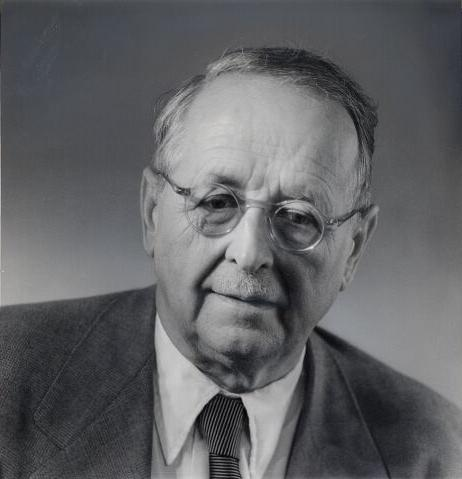
- Born: Hermann Klaus Hugo Weyl; 9 November 1885; Elmshorn, German Empire
- Died: 8 December 1955 (aged 70); Zurich, Switzerland
- Education: Ludwig-Maximilians-Universität München; University of Göttingen
- Known for: List of topics named after Hermann Weyl; Ontic structural realism Weyl equation Weyl group Peter–Weyl theorem Weyl's lemma Weyl quantization Gauge theory Weyl curvature tensor Weyl's law
- Spouses: Friederike Bertha Helene Joseph (m. 1913; died 1948); Ellen Bär (m. 1950)
- Children: Fritz Joachim Weyl (1915–1977); Michael Weyl (1917–2011)
- Awards: Fellow of the Royal Society; Lobachevsky Prize (1927); Gibbs Lecture (1948)
- Scientific career
- Fields: Pure mathematics, mathematical physics, foundations of mathematics, logic, theoretical physics, philosophy
- Workplaces: Institute for Advanced Study; University of Göttingen; ETH Zurich
- Thesis: Singuläre Integralgleichungen mit besonder Berücksichtigung des Fourierschen Integraltheorems (1908)
- Doctoral advisor: David Hilbert
- Doctoral students: Alexander Weinstein; Gerhard Gentzen; Saunders Mac Lane; Julius Adams Stratton; Fritz Gassmann
- Other notable students: Julius Adams Stratton; John von Neumann; Claude Shannon

Hermann Klaus Hugo Weyl (/vaɪl/ VILE; German: [vaɪl]; 9 November 1885 – 8 December 1955) was a German mathematician, theoretical physicist, logician, philosopher and polymath. He was one of the most influential mathematicians of the twentieth century. Although much of his working life was spent in Zürich, Switzerland, and then Princeton, New Jersey, he is associated with the University of Göttingen tradition of mathematics, represented by Carl Friedrich Gauss, David Hilbert and Hermann Minkowski.

Weyl made significant contributions to an exceptionally wide range of intellectual fields, including mathematics, physics, philosophy and logic, with interests extending to the nature of space, time, matter and symmetry, as well as the history of mathematics. The originator of gauge theory, which became a fundamental framework of particle physics, Weyl was a pioneer in applying group theory to quantum mechanics, and made foundational contributions to many branches of mathematics such as differential geometry and number theory. He developed or introduced concepts and results such as gauge invariance, the Peter–Weyl theorem, equidistribution theorem and the Weyl law. His work on group theory and symmetry also helped lay the foundations for structuralist approaches to the philosophy of science, and has been regarded as an important precursor of ontic structural realism.

He was one of the first to conceive of combining general relativity with the laws of electromagnetism. In cosmology, he theoretically derived the linear redshift–distance relation later known as Hubble's redshift law, several years before Hubble's observations.

An important member of the Institute for Advanced Study during its early years, Weyl conceived of mathematics as an organic whole, a view informed by his philosophical outlook, and this conception shaped his work across disciplines. Freeman Dyson wrote that Weyl alone bore comparison with the "last great universal mathematicians of the nineteenth century", Henri Poincaré and David Hilbert. Vladimir Arnold and Aleksei Parshin said that his mathematical, philosophical, physical and literary breadth made him “a phenomenon of twentieth-century German culture in entirety".

== Biography ==
Hermann Weyl was born in Elmshorn, a small town near Hamburg, in Germany, and attended the Gymnasium Christianeum in Altona. His father, Ludwig Weyl, was a banker; whereas his mother, Anna Weyl (née Dieck), came from a wealthy family.

From 1904 to 1908, he studied mathematics and physics at both the University of Göttingen and the Ludwig-Maximilians-Universität München. His doctorate was awarded at the University of Göttingen under the supervision of David Hilbert, whom he greatly admired.

In 1913, Weyl married Friederike Bertha Helene Joseph, known as Helene or Hella. Helene had studied philosophy and mathematics at the University of Göttingen, where she attended the lectures of phenomenologist Edmund Husserl. She later became a translator of Spanish and English literature into German, particularly the works of Spanish philosopher José Ortega y Gasset. Helene's studies under Husserl seem to have helped stimulate Weyl's interest in phenomenology, although Weyl had himself attended Husserl's lectures during his student years in Göttingen. Weyl and Helene had two sons, Fritz Joachim Weyl and Michael Weyl, both of whom were born in Zürich, Switzerland. Helene died in Princeton, New Jersey, on 5 September 1948. A memorial service in her honor was held in Princeton on 9 September 1948. Speakers at her memorial service included her son Fritz Joachim Weyl and mathematicians Oswald Veblen and Richard Courant. In 1950, Weyl married sculptor Ellen Bär (née Lohnstein), who was the widow of professor Richard Josef Bär of Zürich.

After taking a teaching post for a few years, Weyl left Göttingen in 1913 for Zurich to take the chair of mathematics. There he overlapped with Albert Einstein, who, together with Marcel Grossmann, was working on the mathematical formulation of general relativity. Einstein's work helped ignite Weyl's interest in mathematical physics, particularly the theory of relativity. In 1921, Weyl met Erwin Schrödinger, a theoretical physicist who at the time was a professor at the University of Zurich. They were to become close friends over time. Weyl and Schrödinger's wife, Annemarie ("Anny") Schrödinger, began a relationship that lasted for several years that Schrödinger learned of only in the early 1930s. By that time the Schrödingers were living in an open marriage, and the revelation did not damage his friendship with Weyl.

Weyl was a Plenary Speaker of the International Congress of Mathematicians (ICM) in 1928 at Bologna and an Invited Speaker of the ICM in 1936 at Oslo. For the academic year 1928–1929, he was a visiting professor at Princeton University where he wrote a paper, "On a problem in the theory of groups arising in the foundations of infinitesimal geometry," with Howard P. Robertson.

In 1930, Weyl left the University of Zürich to succeed David Hilbert as professor of mathematics at the University of Göttingen. He remained there until 1933, when he left Germany in opposition to the Nazi regime. His decision was also influenced by the fact that his wife, Helene, was Jewish and their sons were classified as Jewish under Nazi racial laws. Abraham Flexner, the director of the newly established Institute for Advanced Study in Princeton, had first approached Weyl about joining its faculty in 1932. Although Weyl initially accepted the offer, he later declined it after the death of his mother-in-law and an outbreak of influenza in his household. As conditions in Germany deteriorated, Flexner renewed the offer in September 1933, and Weyl accepted. He joined the Institute's faculty that year and remained there until his retirement in 1951, when he became Professor Emeritus. After retiring, he divided his time between Princeton and Zürich with his second wife Ellen Bär. He died of a heart attack in Zürich on 8 December 1955.

Weyl was cremated in Zurich on 12 December 1955. His remains were subsequently interred in a columbarium at Princeton Cemetery in 1999. The remains of Weyl's son Michael Weyl (1917–2011) are interred right next to Hermann's ashes in the same columbarium vault.

Weyl's conception of God has been recognised as similar to the philosophy of Baruch Spinoza, particularly his understanding of God or nature.

=== Working Style ===
According to Max Newman, Weyl’s working style was characterised by a conceptual theme: he preferred arguments emerging from the central core of a problem to computational verification, and often favoured verbal formulations over symbolic ones. Nevertheless, this taste for general theories did not diminish his rigour for mathematical detail, and he regarded examples as essential to mathematical understanding. Newman described his writing as leisurely and rich in ideas. Schrödinger was astonished about how he found Weyl’s written explanations harder to follow than his speech. He attributed this to mathematical objects and conclusions being so apparent to Weyl that he sometimes omitted intermediate steps other people considered necessary. Schrödinger attributed this partly to Weyl’s aesthetic sensibility.

== Mathematics ==
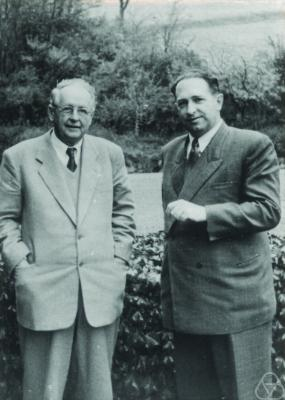
Hermann Weyl (left) with Ernst Peschl

Hermann Weyl's work had a foundational influence on much of mathematics. In particular, he is credited with deeply shaping several fields, including differential geometry, topological groups, Lie groups, representation theory, harmonic analysis, analytic number theory and spectral theory. Claude Chevalley and André Weil credited Weyl's work with contributing greatly to the shift in mathematical thinking from the classical conception of mathematics, founded on the real number, to the modern conception, founded on the notion of structure.

Max Newman wrote that Weyl was at the peak of his powers between 1917 and 1927, adding: "A stream of papers appeared, not only on his main themes, but on any mathematical topics that interested him—and that meant in almost all parts of mathematics."

=== Manifolds and Topology ===
Weyl's 1913 book, Die Idee der Riemannschen Fläche (The Concept of a Riemann Surface), based on his Göttingen lectures of 1911–12, provided the first precise axiomatic definition of an abstract manifold. At the time, the theory of Riemann surfaces, pioneered by Bernhard Riemann and Felix Klein, was not a fully rigorous field and relied on intuitive geometry in large part. Weyl's work grounded this more intuitive picture with a systematic foundation. He defined the concept of a two-dimensional topological manifold abstractly by using a list of axioms which are independent of any embedding in a larger space. Holomorphic transition functions were then added between coordinate charts, creating a complex-analytic manifold, a Riemann surface in the modern sense. The work laid the axiomatic foundations for the theory of Riemann surfaces, by becoming the model for all subsequent kinds of manifolds studied in the twentieth century, such as differentiable, complex, Riemannian, and symplectic manifolds. The book also gave a new proof of the Dirichlet principle, following Hilbert, to establish the existence of global meromorphic functions on these surfaces. Mathematician Leo Sario described Weyl's 1913 publication as "undoubtedly [having] a greater influence on the development of geometric function theory than any other publication since Riemann's dissertation."

=== Differential Geometry ===
By 1915, Albert Einstein's general theory of relativity had successfully described gravity as the curvature of four-dimensional spacetime. However, electromagnetism remained a separate force, described by Maxwell's equations rather than by geometry. It was widely felt that a truly fundamental theory should not treat these as two unrelated phenomena, but should show some sort of unity; Einstein himself considered it a primary shortcoming of his theory that it did not unify gravitation and electromagnetism.

Weyl found it philosophically and mathematically unsatisfying that Riemannian geometry allowed for the direct comparison of lengths at distant points, which he saw as a "last element of geometry 'at a distance'" and an accidental remnant of its Euclidean origins. He argued that a "true infinitesimal geometry" should only permit the comparison of lengths at the same point or at infinitesimally close points. His ambition was to construct a geometry based on this purely infinitesimal principle. His insight was that in the process of fixing this perceived mathematical flaw, the resulting geometric structure would also naturally accommodate the electromagnetic field.

In 1918, Weyl introduced a generalisation of Riemannian geometry known as Weyl geometry, based on a local scale (gauge) symmetry. In it, the length of a vector is not constant when it is moved from one point to another, so its length can change depending on the path taken. This change is described by a new field, a 1-form Aμ, which mathematically acts as the electromagnetic four-potential. The gravitational field is described by the spacetime metric (as in general relativity), while the electromagnetic field is described by the new gauge field Aμ that dictates how lengths change from point to point. Both are now facets of a single, unified geometric structure. From this framework Weyl derived a tensor that exists as a Riemannian conformal object, not something that subsists only within Weyl’s full gauge geometry. This tensor, later called the Weyl tensor, is the trace-free part of the Riemann curvature tensor and is conformally invariant. The Weyl tensor became a fundamental object in differential geometry and general relativity, where it describes tidal forces and gravitational waves.

Einstein critiqued the physical aspect of Weyl’s theory, noting that if the length of a vector is path-dependent, then the rate of a clock (whose ticking is based on a physical length, such as the size of an atom) would also depend on its history. This leads to the prediction of a not yet observed effect, the so-called "second clock effect". In a space-time ruled by Weyl geometry, the existence of sharp spectral lines in the presence of an electromagnetic field would not be possible since atomic clocks would depend on their past history. Since sharp spectral lines are observed in nature, Einstein concluded that Weyl's theory could not be a correct description of physical reality. Despite this, Einstein praised the idea’s ingenuity. He wrote “Apart from agreement with reality, it is in any case a grandiose achievement of thought [...] its depth and boldness must fill every reader with admiration."

=== Lie groups, representation theory and invariant theory ===
Alongside Élie Cartan, Weyl was a major influence in establishing Lie group theory and algebraic group theory as basic fields of mathematical research. In 1925-26, he wrote four papers, described as "epochal", in representation theory of Lie groups, which solved fundamental problems and also gave birth to the subject of harmonic analysis of semisimple Lie groups. These papers drew together Schur's work on the rotation group, Cartan's classification of semisimple Lie algebras, Hilbert's theory of integral equations, and invariant theory. Weyl regarded them as his greatest mathematical work.

The papers built a general theory of finite-dimensional representations of semisimple Lie groups. The Weyl group is the subgroup generated by reflections through the hyperplanes orthogonal to the roots, and as such is a finite reflection group; the Weyl character formula describes the characters of irreducible representations in terms of their highest weights; and the Weyl dimension formula is a corollary of the character formula. Weyl proved the character formula analytically, by integration over a compact group, using Hilbert's integral equations. The unitary trick later let him pass from the compact case to the complex semisimple case, and he gave the resulting algebraic treatment in The Classical Groups (1939).

Together with Fritz Peter, he also proved the Peter–Weyl theorem in 1927, which establishes that, for a compact topological group, the finite-dimensional (almost invariant) functions form a uniformly dense set within the space of all continuous functions. The theorem provided a generalisation of Fourier analysis to non-commutative compact groups, demonstrating that their functions could be decomposed into contributions from irreducible representations. This launched what is now known as harmonic analysis on groups. This work, alongside his 1925 papers on semisimple groups, constitutes an important landmark in the history of Lie theory and mathematics more broadly. André Weil and Claude Chevalley remarked that after the discovery of Haar measure, "not a word needed to be changed" in Weyl's exposition, and "no one even thought to rewrite it, a rare occurrence in mathematics.”

In 1939 he published The Classical Groups: Their Invariants and Representations, which treated the general linear, special linear, orthogonal, and symplectic groups together. The book linked classical invariant theory with modern representation theory. It showed how to understand polynomial invariants of the general linear, orthogonal, and symplectic groups through linear representations and tensor methods. It has been widely credited with reviving interest in invariant theory. Weyl also coined the now-standard term "classical groups".

Weyl placed quantum-mechanical symmetry on a group-theoretic footing, including spinors. Together with John von Neumann’s independent Hilbert space formulation, this shaped the standard mathematical treatment of quantum mechanics that emerged in the early 1930s.

The Weyl algebra, whose relations Weyl had set out in 1927, subsequently became an important object in noncommutative algebra and the theory of differential operators, with applications to partial differential equations, D-module theory and symplectic geometry. It has been described as serving as a bridge between these disparate fields.

=== Integral Equations and Spectral Theory ===
Weyl’s 1910 paper is credited with initiating the modern study of singular Sturm–Liouville problems. It was a separation from the older regular Sturm–Liouville theory, which could only handle finite intervals and discrete spectra. Weyl’s circle method treats the eigenvalue equation for non-real values of the spectral parameter and follows the nested circles traced out by the Weyl m-function as the interval grows toward a singular endpoint. These circles either shrink to a point or tend to a limiting circle, giving the limit-point/limit-circle alternative. In the limit-circle case a boundary condition is needed for a self-adjoint realization, whereas in the limit-point case the endpoint is already essentially self-adjoint. The resulting eigenfunction expansions have both a discrete and a continuous part. Separately, Weyl’s stability theorem shows that the essential spectrum is invariant under compact perturbations and, in particular, does not change when the boundary condition is changed. The theory has remained an intensely active field of research ever since, and the paper has been described as a milestone in the development of twentieth-century mathematical analysis.

Weyl's work on integral equations began with Hilbert's program of applying spectral theory to symmetric kernels. Hilbert had shown that the method failed in singular cases. Weyl's 1908 dissertation gave sufficient conditions on the kernel K(s,t) for the associated bilinear form to remain bounded on an unbounded interval, thereby extending Hilbert's spectral theory to cases where complete continuity fails.

Weyl's law came directly out of this line of work. In 1911, building on Hilbert's spectral theorem for compact self-adjoint operators, Weyl proved that the number of eigenvalues below a given value grows asymptotically in proportion to the volume of the domain and to the d/2-th power of that value, where d is the dimension. This settled a conjecture of Lorentz and Sommerfeld and "had a tremendous impact in Mathematics". Spectral geometry is described as "starting with Weyl's law on the asymptotic distribution of eigenvalues of Laplacians", and the law remains the "founding result of the field".

=== Analytic number theory ===
In 1916, Weyl proved the equidistribution theorem, showing that the multiples of an irrational number are uniformly distributed modulo one. The linear sequence for irrationals had already been proven earlier, by Weyl together with Sierpiński and Bohl, the subsequent proof showed this for polynomials with at least one irrational coefficient. The linear case then follows as a simple special case of this much stronger result. In the same work he introduced what became known as Weyl's inequality for exponential sums, a powerful estimate that became a standard tool in analytic number theory and was used by later mathematicians in work on Waring's problem and the Riemann zeta function.

Weyl also established what became known as Weyl's criterion, a necessary and sufficient condition for a sequence to be uniformly distributed modulo one, expressed in terms of the convergence of its associated exponential sums. This criterion reduces the study of equidistribution to estimating exponential sums, which is the type of problem for which Weyl's inequality provides a general tool. Weyl's 1916 work is considered to have founded discrepancy theory, which studies the deviation of finite sequences from uniform distribution. It has since developed into an important field with applications in computer science, particularly in randomised computation, derandomisation, geometric sampling and computational complexity.

== Physics ==
=== General Relativity ===
In 1918, Weyl wrote Space-Time-Matter which has since been regarded as the standard treatise on the general theory of relativity. Historian Tilman Sauer described it as the first comprehensive mathematical exposition of the theory, explaining that “From a mathematical point of view, its first publication in 1918 is perhaps of equal importance as the publication of the relativistic field equations by Einstein in late 1915 which constituted the theory in the first place.” Weyl stated his intention in writing it was to "understand what really is the mathematical substance behind the formal apparatus of relativity theory."

In 1924, Weyl proposed a topological model of electric charge involving one-dimensional tubes in spacetime, thereby developing an early form of the modern concept of a wormhole. This idea was later recognised by John Archibald Wheeler, who coined the term "wormhole" and credited Weyl with the underlying topological insight.

=== Cosmology ===
Einstein's cosmological model assumed a static universe and required a positive cosmological constant. In the fifth edition of Space-Time-Matter (1923), Weyl argued that Einstein's static model suffered from defects such as spectroscopic results indicating that the stars have a finite age. In addition, de Sitter's solution forced cosmologists to abandon the assumption of a static universe as it admitted the possibility of a non-static universe. He proposed instead what became known as Weyl's postulate: that the world lines of the galaxies form a sheaf of non-intersecting timelike geodesics, orthogonal to a family of spacelike hypersurfaces and converging toward a common origin in the distant past. Weyl suggested that this would explain the small observed velocities of the stars "as a consequence of their common origin". Combined with the cosmological principle, Weyl's postulate is one of the two main assumptions the Friedmann–Lemaître–Robertson–Walker metric is built upon.

==== Deriving Hubble's Redshift Law ====
Weyl’s introduction of his postulate provided him with the necessary tools to give a substantial treatment of the cosmological redshift. Applying this framework to the de Sitter universe, Weyl derived a frequency shift that, to first order, is linear in distance, the relation later known as Hubble's law. This was the first demonstration of the linear redshift–distance relation, preceding Hubble's observational confirmation by several years; Georges Lemaître, who derived the relation independently in 1927, cited Weyl's paper. Using Slipher's redshifts together with the distance estimates then available, Weyl also made an early estimate of the Hubble constant in 1923. Jürgen Ehlers approximates it to be ~1000 km/s/Mpc.

=== Gauge Theory and Unified Field Theory ===
Weyl's 1918 attempt to geometrically unify gravity and electromagnetism did not gain acceptance due to the criticisms of Einstein. However, the concept of gauge invariance which Weyl had developed survived the rejection of its original setting. In 1927, Fritz London reinterpreted Weyl’s gauge factor as a quantum-mechanical phase rather than a change of length. Weyl adopted this reading in 1929, recasting the concept as a symmetry principle from which electromagnetism could be derived, the principle he now named gauge invariance, laying the foundation for modern gauge theory. Lochlainn O'Raifeartaigh emphasised the historical significance of the 1929 paper and wrote “It must now be regarded as one of the seminal papers of the century”, noting that beyond introducing the gauge principle it contained other innovative ideas that subsequently became part of the culture of theoretical physics. The gauge principle then became the basis of the modern theory of electroweak and strong interactions, and Yang–Mills theory generalized it to non-Abelian groups. Freeman Dyson later described Weyl’s gauge field as “one of the basic concepts of modern particle physics”. Quantum electrodynamics and the Standard Model, both gauge theories, have been described as the most successful theories in the history of physics.

Weyl's 1918 theory had the necessary ingredients: a connection 1-form $A_\mu$, a path-dependent factor $e^{\int A}$, and local invariance. Quantum mechanics kept the structure, and changed the exponent from real to imaginary, $\int A \to i(e/\hbar)\int A$. Only the group changed, from $\mathbb{R}_{>0}$ to $U(1)$.

=== Group Theory in Quantum Mechanics ===
In late 1927, Weyl began giving lectures at ETH Zürich on the application of group theory to quantum mechanics, having originally planned a course on group theory alone. The course was then developed into a paper the same year, and nearly all the topics of the course were taken up again a year later in his book titled Gruppentheorie und Quantenmechanik. In the same 1927 paper, Weyl also introduced the first major quantization procedure, now known as Weyl quantization, which associates quantum-mechanical operators with classical observables represented by functions of space and momentum. The book is considered to contain the systematic and comprehensive account of the then new quantum theory. It had five chapters, running from finite-dimensional Hilbert spaces to the symmetric permutation group. Weyl's intention was to provide an 'organically coherent account' of the mathematical knowledge known in the field of group theory, and it has been referred to as ‘authoritative’ for the group-theoretic approach.

Part of its importance lies in its explanatory account of the theory of atomic spectra in terms of the unitary representation theory of the rotation group. Weyl indicated that all quantum numbers, but the principal, are indices characterizing representations of groups. The spherical symmetry of the atom and the permutation symmetry of its electrons together dictate the allowed configurations. The same machinery let him treat the anomalous Zeeman effect. After Dirac's 1928 papers, on the relativistic electron, it allowed him to simplify it from the point of view of group representations, and put it into a general relativistic framework in subsequent papers. Weyl suggested the way to arrive at the self-adjoint operators that represented a physical quantity has not received an answer, and group theory may provide one that is satisfactory.

Group theory was not universally welcomed by physicists. In September 1928, Paul Ehrenfest complained of the “Gruppenpest” ('group plague'). Resistance grew after John Slater demonstrated that atomic multiplets could be calculated without group theory, a result welcomed by many physicists. Max Born attempted to throw group theory out of the theory of atomic and molecular structures, as far as possible. Despite this, it soon became a classic in the field, and the role of group theory in physics has become an indispensable tool. John Archibald Wheeler praised it immensely as an introduction to quantum theory, and Julian Schwinger said that this work " ... was the starting point of my own considerations concerning the connection between spin and statistics, which culminated in what is now referred to as the TCP - or some permutation thereof - theorem".

According to Yang Chen-Ning,

His book was very famous, and was recognized as profound. Almost every theoretical physicist born before 1935 has a copy of it on his bookshelves. But very few read it: Most are not accustomed to Weyl's concentration on the structural aspects of physics and feel uncomfortable with his emphasis on concepts. The book was just too abstract for most physicists.

In his 1930 textbook The Principles of Quantum Mechanics, Paul Dirac presented a general formulation of quantum mechanics using an abstract symbolic method, rather than the representational approaches of matrix and wave mechanics. He identified Weyl's Gruppentheorie und Quantenmechanik as the only prior work to employ this symbolic method.

=== Relativistic Quantum Mechanics ===
Weyl's 1929 paper "Elektron und Gravitation" is remembered for its treatment of the Dirac equation in general relativity. In the section headed Zweikomponententheorie, Weyl observed that setting the mass term to zero causes the equations of the two-spinor version of Dirac's equation to decouple, yielding two independent two-component pieces. Weyl noted that instead of the four-component Dirac spinor, two components suffice if the requirement of left-right symmetry is dropped, and that it is only the empirical fact of parity symmetry that forces a second pair. The left-handed equation became known as the Weyl equation. Wolfgang Pauli was initially sharply critical, and the theory was set aside as it was thought to have intrinsically broken reflection symmetry. It stayed dormant until 1956–57, when Lee and Yang showed that parity is violated in the weak interaction. With the realisation that left-right symmetry was not exactly right in 1957, Weyl's theory was revisited. Yang describes the subsequent outcome as "verified theoretically and experimentally that this [two-component] theory gave, in fact, the correct description of the neutrino."

The concept later found an application in condensed-matter physics, where Weyl fermions were realised as quasiparticle excitations in Weyl semimetals. In 2015, Weyl points were observed in tantalum arsenide, providing the first experimental realisation of Weyl fermions in a material system.

His 1931 analysis of the quantized Maxwell–Dirac field equations gave a complete treatment of the symmetries now called C, P, T, and CPT symmetry. His transformations C and P are the same as those used today. Recent scholars have shown in detail his T and CPT operations are close to the modern ones, differing mainly in that he treated them as linear and unitary rather than antilinear and antiunitary. That ruled out Dirac's earlier attempt to identify the proton with the hole in the negative-energy sea. The positron, discovered in 1932, settled the point. Yang was also astonished by Weyl's treatment of the symmetries associated with the interchange of right and left, past and future, and positive and negative electricity. He remarked that virtually nobody in 1930 suspected that these symmetries were related, and what prompted Weyl to write it down was to him a mystery.

== Philosophy ==
=== Foundations ===
==== Logic ====
Weyl's most substantial contribution to mathematical logic and the foundations of mathematics was his 1918 monograph Das Kontinuum, in which he attempted to reconstruct mathematical analysis on strictly predicative foundations, rejecting impredicative definitions as circular. Weyl showed that all of the classical analysis of pointwise continuous functions can be carried out predicatively, including substantial parts of calculus. Logician Solomon Feferman has further shown Weyl’s work can be formalized in a second-order system, usually denoted ACA₀. Feferman develops a certain system W, as a conservative extension of PA, which he designates as a continuation of Weyl's (named in his honour), and he proposes all scientifically applicable mathematics can be developed within it. Das Kontinuum is now regarded as a foundational treatise in the development of modern predicative mathematics.

Weyl's predicative foundations were shaped in a general way by transcendental idealism exemplified by Fichte and Husserl. Weyl argued that a point of the continuum has no independent existence, it is only a "point of transition". Hence, any attempt to fix a point exactly is an idealisation never realized in intuition. Weyl's system of mathematical categories has been recognised as closely resembling the type structures of modern logic. According to John Lane Bell, “The idea of typing as a natural fact of logical life was grasped by Hermann Weyl in Das Kontinuum." In 2010, Robin Adams and Zhaohui Luo formalised substantial portions of Das Kontinuum as a logic-enriched type theory.

Weyl's 1910 paper "Über die Definitionen der mathematischen Grundbegriffe" anticipated important developments in modern logic. In responding to Zermelo's set theory and the problem of "definite properties", Weyl formulated a system of logical principles for generating definite relations from primitive relations through finitely many applications of specified operations. Although he did not employ a formal logical language, these principles are recognised retrospectively as a form of first-order logic, which became fundamental tools of model theory. Feferman has argued that Weyl's paper contains a general account of definability over any relational structure, which Weyl then applied to the specific case of sets with membership, and that this anticipates Alfred Tarski's later famous contributions. He considers the work "sadly overlooked", observing that the idea is usually credited to Skolem or Fraenkel in the 1920s, and arguing that it is "quite clearly right there" in Weyl's paper.

Despite his influence in the field, Weyl’s published works in logic are not many. Feferman notes that from his corpus, “only about a dozen concerned logic and the foundations of mathematics”.

==== Intuitionism and Later Developments ====
Shortly after publishing Das Kontinuum, Weyl shifted his position briefly to the intuitionism of L. E. J. Brouwer, from his earlier predicativism. In his 1921 paper On the New Foundational Crisis in Mathematics, Weyl rejected the conception of the continuum as an aggregate of discrete points, which he had adopted in Das Kontinuum. Famously declaring "Brouwer—that is the revolution!", Weyl is thought to have been more influential in propelling intuitionism than Brouwer himself through his controversial 1921 paper. He achieved this through his clear and coherent presentation of the core ideas. This temporarily caused a rift with his teacher Hilbert, who was the primary opposition to Brouwer. Andrey Kolmogorov, when philosophically reinterpreting intuitionistic logic in 1931, wrote "All further investigation of negative and existential propositions is, in essence, connected with this work of Weyl".

On 9 February 1918, Weyl and George Pólya made a wager in Zürich concerning the future of mathematics. Weyl predicted that within twenty years a majority of leading mathematicians would recognise the falsity of the least-upper-bound property. He further maintained that mathematical concepts such as numbers and sets were so vague that asking whether the property held was as meaningful as asking about the truth of Hegel's fundamental assertions in his Philosophy of Nature. Some years after the wager expired, Weyl admitted that he had lost, putting the result at 49 to 51 percent. When the wager was eventually called, everyone except Kurt Gödel agreed that Pólya had won.

By the mid-1920s, Weyl had moved away from Brouwer's intuitionism, increasingly troubled by the restrictions it placed on classical mathematics. He nevertheless remained dissatisfied with Hilbert's formalism, and sought a middle position between the two. In his 1925 paper The Current Epistemological Situation in Mathematics, he argued that “beside Brouwer’s way, one will also have to pursue that of Hilbert”. He subsequently advocated a blend of Hilbert's axiomatic methods with Brouwer's constructive approach, rather than an exclusive commitment to either. Weyl succeeded Hilbert to the chair of Mathematics in Göttingen in 1930 on Hilbert's request, having mended their relationship.

His final position culminated in a ‘symbolic construction’, which held that the objective world, extending beyond immediate experience and intuition, could only be represented through mathematical and scientific symbols. An example being natural numbers, which he described as “the simplest, and in a certain sense most profound, example of symbolic construction”.

=== Metaphysics and Phenomenology ===
Although Weyl was deeply interested in philosophy throughout his life, he never developed a comprehensive philosophical system. His philosophical ideas and contributions were instead dispersed across his mathematical and scientific writings, lectures and essays, and underwent evolution over his career. His outlook was initially shaped by German idealism and phenomenology, particularly the writings of Immanuel Kant, Edmund Husserl and Johann Gottlieb Fichte. As a schoolboy, he was impressed by Kant's Critique of Pure Reason, especially its conception of space and time as forms of intuition. His enthusiasm for Kant declined after he entered Göttingen in 1904 and read Hilbert's Foundations of Geometry, which led him to regard Kant's restriction of geometry to Euclidean space as untenable. He then lapsed into a period of positivism, before finding a new philosophical influence in Husserl's phenomenology in 1912. During his later years in Zürich, Fichte's idealism also became an important influence, particularly through his colleague Fritz Medicus. Throughout his evolution, the primacy of intuition remained central, expressed as the 'inner light' of individual consciousness.

Weyl had already written two essays in 1924, addressing the nature of matter. However, his first substantial exposition of his philosophy comes in “Philosophy of Mathematics and Natural Science”. Weyl praised Brouwer's emphasis on intuition but criticised the restrictions intuitionism imposed on advanced mathematics. He also rejected treating mathematics as a mere manipulation of symbols and formulae, arguing that its concepts themselves acquire meaning through their role in the theoretical construction of reality. The work also examined the nature of number and the continuum, infinity, geometry, and the philosophical problems of space and time. Its latter sections addressed the methodology of the natural sciences and the formation of a scientific worldview. In the revised English edition in 1949, Weyl added extensive material addressing subsequent developments, including Gödel's incompleteness theorem, quantum physics and causality, and the relationship between physics and biology.

According to Frank Wilczek, "Weyl’s most unique work is Philosophy of Mathematics and Natural Science. No one else could have written it, and no other book I know is like it. I have consulted it many times, and each time I’ve come away enriched."

Weyl's later philosophical reflections increasingly centred on the limitations of phenomenology and the relationship between consciousness and objective reality. In The Open World (1932), he argued that the existence of the real Ego, the Thou and the external world could not be established through consciousness alone, but required an act of metaphysical acknowledgment and belief. He rejected the idealist assumption that the Ego possessed a greater claim to certainty than the external world, maintaining that the Ego, the Thou and the external world were acknowledged together, as it were, at one stroke. In his 1954 lecture Insight and Reflection, Weyl examined the problem of selfhood, individual consciousness, and the divine transcendence, and their interplay. His reading of Meister Eckhart led him towards religious mysticism and the possibility of extending his metaphysical account beyond the tripartite. He nevertheless acknowledged that his metaphysical and religious speculations had never achieved full clarity.

Weyl's work on group theory and quantum mechanics also contributed to the development of structuralist approaches in the philosophy of science. His emphasis on symmetry and invariance as foundations of physical objectivity influenced subsequent structuralist interpretations of physics, and his philosophy of physics has been identified as an important precursor to ontic structural realism. Iulian Toader has characterised Weyl's position as "Weylean invariantism", according to which scientific objectivity requires categoricity: that all interpretations of a physical theory be isomorphic.

In Symmetry (1952), Weyl explored the philosophical and aesthetic significance of symmetry across mathematics and physics, its manifestations in organic and inorganic nature, and its applications in sculpture, painting and architecture. The book became a classic treatment of the subject and drew a wide audience, with Marjorie Senechal stating “In 1952 the concept of symmetry had not yet achieved the preeminence in theoretical physics that it has attained since then, nor had group action clearly emerged as a unifying concept in mathematics. It may be that Weyl's little book, in spite of its nontechnical character or, more likely, because of it, played a role in the direction of science itself.”

== Legacy ==
=== Recognition ===
Weyl received high praise from mathematicians and physicists, several of whom regarded him as one of the outstanding intellectual figures of his generation. Roger Penrose called Weyl "the greatest mathematician of this century", emphasising that he was "quite unusual, among pure mathematicians, in the extent and the great depth of his insights into the workings of the physical world." Oswald Veblen observed that Weyl "perhaps came closer to being a universal mathematical genius than anyone else" of the era. G. H. Hardy declared him "the greatest man in the field of geometry in Europe", while Michael Atiyah considered him "probably the most influential mathematician of the twentieth century" who set the agenda for what followed, adding that "No other mathematician could claim to have initiated more of the theories that are now being exploited. His vision has stood the test of time."

Several assessments particularly emphasised the unusual breadth of Weyl's intellectual range. Frank Wilczek remarked:

Every great mathematician is great in their own way, but Weyl’s way was particularly special. Unlike most modern scientists who choose one or a few specific areas to explore and look neither sideways nor back, Weyl surveyed the whole world. He sought truth and beauty with a discriminating and far-seeing eye.

Herman Goldstine described Weyl as "probably one of the deepest and broadest that there ever was", while Solomon Feferman considered him about as broad and original as David Hilbert across all of mathematics. John Archibald Wheeler likened Weyl to Leibniz, remarking that, like Leibniz, "Weyl was an academy." André Weil and Claude Chevalley similarly portrayed his intellectual versatility through the image of Proteus:

A Proteus who transforms himself ceaselessly in order to elude the grip of his adversary, not becoming himself again until after the final victory: this is the impression that Hermann Weyl often leaves us. Didn't he go so far, pushed by the milieu no doubt, by the occasion, but also by "the anxiety of his genius", as to become a logician, a physicist, a philosopher? The axiom Ne supra crepidam forbids us to follow him so far in his metamorphoses.

Weyl's standing among his contemporaries is also reflected in the assessments expressed by leading figures in mathematics and physics. Albert Einstein, writing in 1918, described him as "an ingenious, fine fellow", adding that "everything by him is so original and is elaborated so exquisitely". Einstein later called Weyl "preeminent" and, although he rejected the physical interpretation of Weyl's gauge theory, described the underlying idea as "a stroke of genius of first rank." Norbert Wiener counted Weyl among the greatest forces in modern mathematics and recalled that he was the mathematician "whose opinion I valued above that of all others." According to Armand Borel, Michel Plancherel regarded Weyl's ability to master a new subject and make an important contribution within a few months as unique, shared only by John von Neumann. When asked by a journalist in 1929 whether he had ever encountered someone he could not understand, Paul Dirac replied, "Weyl". Physicist Julian Schwinger described Weyl as one of his gods, explaining that "the ways of gods are mysterious, inscrutable, and beyond the comprehension of ordinary mortals". The mathematician Claus Müller observed that Weyl was uniquely distinguished among twentieth-century mathematicians by being regarded as one of their own by physicists and philosophers, adding that “only Henri Poincaré had a comparably stimulating influence”.

=== Awards and Honours ===
Weyl received the Lobachevsky Prize in 1925 for his contributions to geometry. He was elected a corresponding member of the Göttingen Academy of Sciences and Humanities in 1920, a member of the German National Academy of Sciences Leopoldina in 1923, and a member of the American Academy of Arts and Sciences in 1929. He was elected a Foreign Member of the Royal Society in 1936 and a member of the United States National Academy of Sciences in 1940. He subsequently became a corresponding member of the French Academy of Sciences in 1947 and the Bavarian Academy of Sciences and Humanities in 1951.

Weyl received honorary doctorates from many institutions, such as University of Oslo and the University of Stuttgart in 1929, the University of Pennsylvania in 1940, ETH Zurich in 1945, the University of Paris in 1952, and Columbia University in 1954.

Weyl was also elected an honorary member of the London Mathematical Society in 1939. The lunar crater Weyl and the asteroid 32267 Hermannweyl were named in his honour.

== Quotes ==
- My work always tried to unite the true with the beautiful; but when I had to choose one or the other, I usually chose the beautiful.

— Hermann Weyl, as quoted by Freeman Dyson in "Obituary of Hermann Weyl," Nature 177 (10 March 1956), pp. 457–458; also cited in S. Chandrasekhar, Truth and Beauty (1987), p. 65.

- The question for the ultimate foundations and the ultimate meaning of mathematics remains open; we do not know in which direction it will find its final solution nor even whether a final objective answer can be expected at all. "Mathematizing" may well be a creative activity of man, like language or music, of primary originality, whose historical decisions defy complete objective rationalization.

—Gesammelte Abhandlungen—as quoted in Year book – The American Philosophical Society, 1943, p. 392

- In these days the angel of topology and the devil of abstract algebra fight for the soul of each individual mathematical domain.

—Weyl (1939b, p. 500)

- Whenever you have to do with a structure-endowed entity S try to determine its group of automorphisms, the group of those element-wise transformations which leave all structural relations undisturbed. You can expect to gain a deep insight into the constitution of S in this way.

—Symmetry, Princeton Univ. Press, p. 144; 1952

- Beyond the knowledge gained from the individual sciences, there remains the task of **comprehending**. In spite of the fact that the views of philosophy sway from one system to another, we cannot dispense with it unless we are to convert knowledge into a meaningless chaos.

—Space-Time-Matter, 4th edition (1922), English translation, Dover (1952) p. 10; Weyl's boldfaced highlight.

== Bibliography ==
- 1911. Über die asymptotische Verteilung der Eigenwerte, Nachrichten der Königlichen Gesellschaft der Wissenschaften zu Göttingen, 110–117 (1911).
- 1913. Die Idee der Riemannschen Fläche, 2d 1955. The Concept of a Riemann Surface. Addison–Wesley.
- 1918. Das Kontinuum, trans. 1987 The Continuum : A Critical Examination of the Foundation of Analysis. ISBN 0-486-67982-9
- 1918. Raum, Zeit, Materie. 5 edns. to 1922 ed. with notes by Jūrgen Ehlers, 1980. trans. 4th edn. Henry Brose, 1922 Space Time Matter, Methuen, rept. 1952 Dover. ISBN 0-486-60267-2.
- 1923. Mathematische Analyse des Raumproblems.
- 1924. Was ist Materie?
- 1925. (publ. 1988 ed. K. Chandrasekharan) Riemann's Geometrische Idee.
- 1927. Philosophie der Mathematik und Naturwissenschaft, 2d edn. 1949. Philosophy of Mathematics and Natural Science, Princeton 0689702078. With new introduction by Frank Wilczek, Princeton University Press, 2009, ISBN 978-0-691-14120-6.
- 1928. Gruppentheorie und Quantenmechanik. transl. by H. P. Robertson, The Theory of Groups and Quantum Mechanics, 1931, rept. 1950 Dover. ISBN 0-486-60269-9
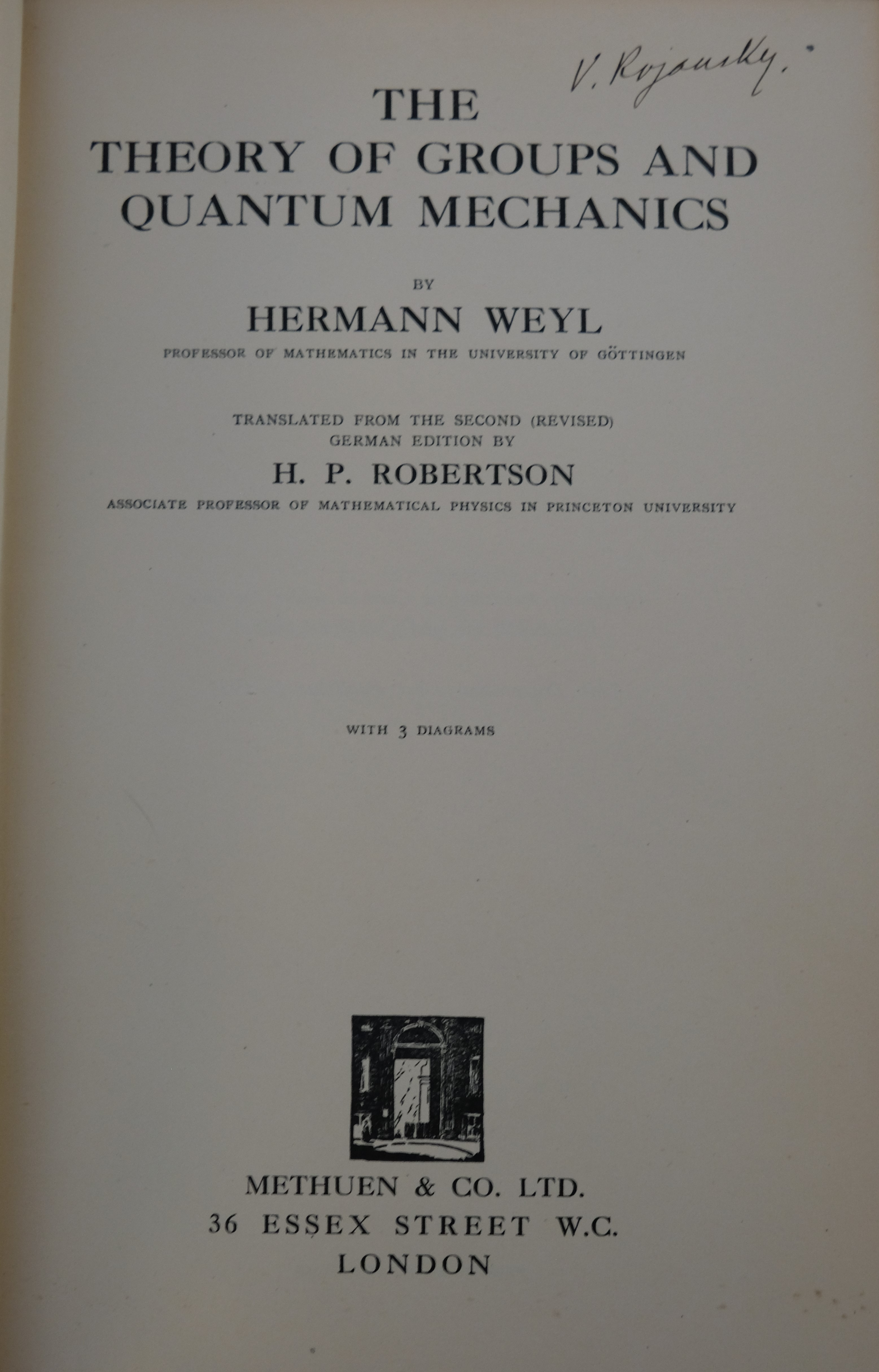
- The Theory of Groups and Quantum Mechanics (translated from the second, revised German edition by Howard P. Robertson)
  1929. "Elektron und Gravitation I", Zeitschrift Physik, 56, pp 330–352. – introduction of the vierbein into GR
- 1931: The Theory of Groups and Quantum Mechanics," London, : Methuen & Co., [1931]
- 1933. The Open World Yale, rept. 1989 Oxbow Press ISBN 0-918024-70-6
- 1934. Mind and Nature U. of Pennsylvania Press.
- 1934. "On generalized Riemann matrices," Ann. Math. 35: 400–415.
- 1935. Elementary Theory of Invariants.
- 1935. The structure and representation of continuous groups: Lectures at Princeton university during 1933–34.
- Weyl, Hermann (1997) [1939], The Classical Groups. Their Invariants and Representations, Princeton University Press, ISBN 978-0-691-05756-9, MR 0000255
- Weyl, Hermann (1939b), "Invariants", Duke Mathematical Journal, 5 (3): 489–502, doi:10.1215/S0012-7094-39-00540-5, ISSN 0012-7094, MR 0000030
- 1940. Algebraic Theory of Numbers rept. 1998 Princeton U. Press. ISBN 0-691-05917-9
- Weyl, Hermann (1950), "Ramifications, old and new, of the eigenvalue problem", Bull. Amer. Math. Soc., 56 (2): 115–139, doi:10.1090/S0002-9904-1950-09369-0 (text of 1948 Josiah Wilard Gibbs Lecture)
- 1952. Symmetry. Princeton University Press. ISBN 0-691-02374-3
- 1968. in K. Chandrasekharan ed, Gesammelte Abhandlungen. Vol IV. Springer.
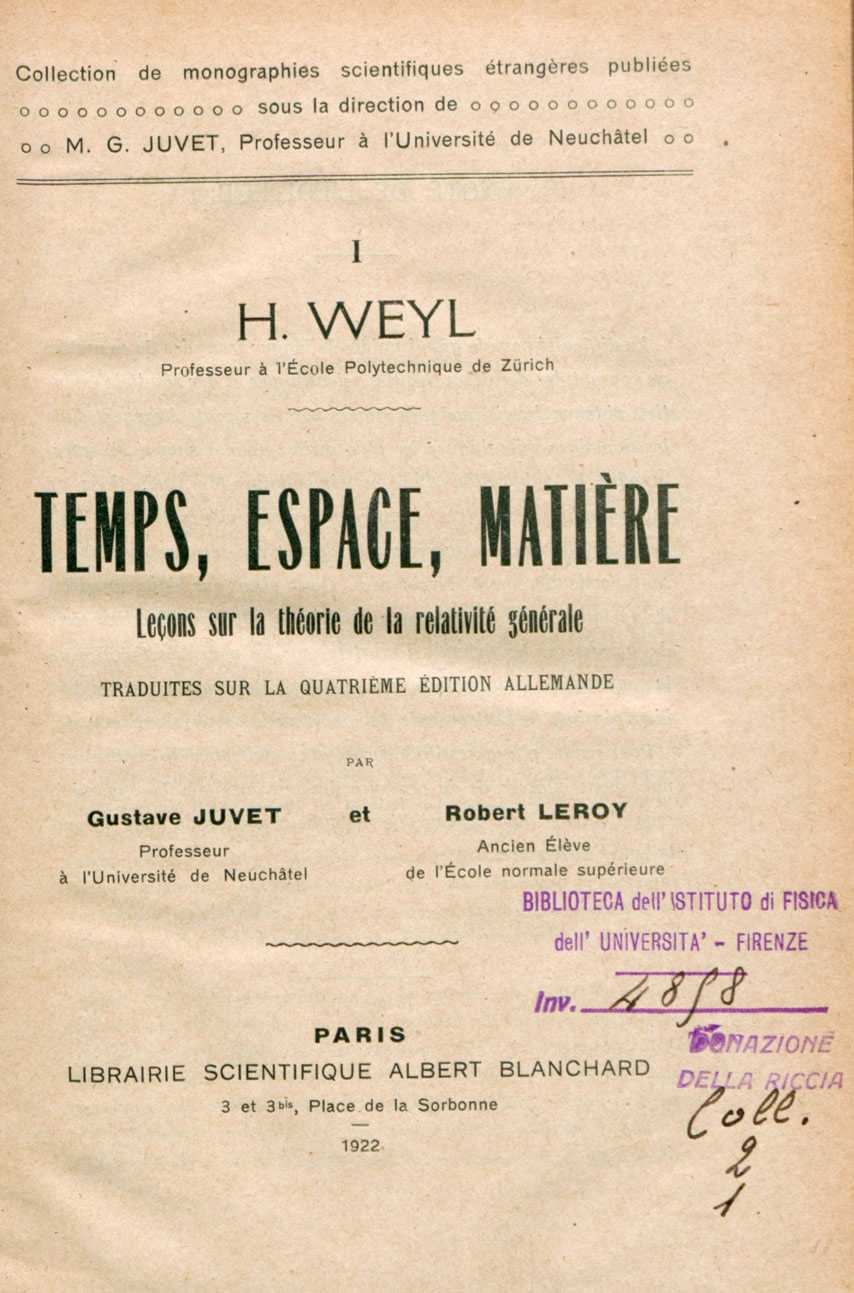
Temps, espace, matière (French, 1922)

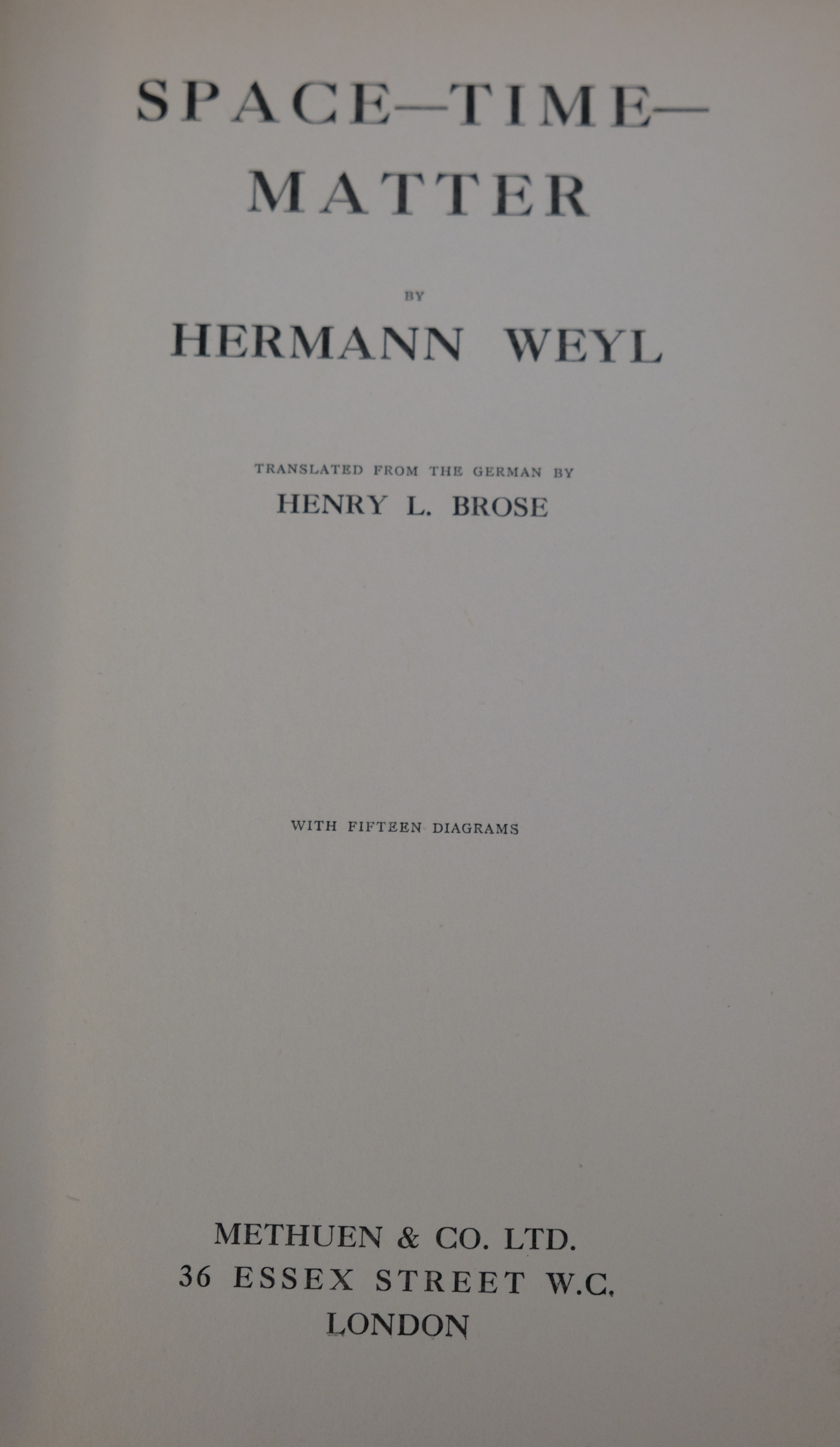
Space, Time, Matter (English, 1922: translated from German from Henry L. Brose)

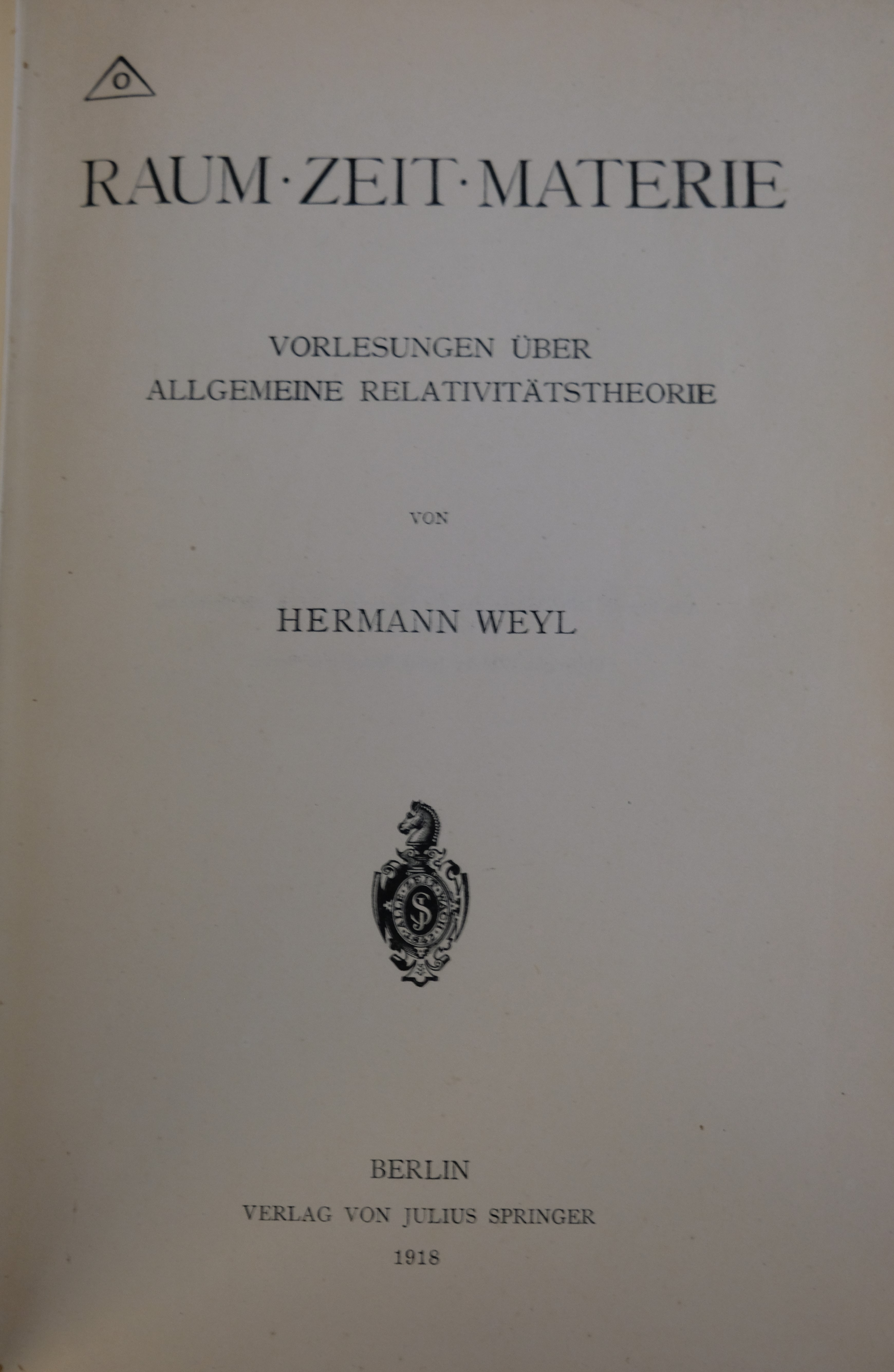
Raum - Zeit - Materie (German, 1918)

== See also ==
=== Topics named after Hermann Weyl ===
- Majorana–Weyl spinor
- Peter–Weyl theorem
- Schur–Weyl duality
- Weyl algebra
- Weyl basis of the gamma matrices
- Weyl chamber
- Weyl character formula
- Weyl equation, a relativistic wave equation
- Weyl expansion
- Weyl fermion
- Weyl gauge
- Weyl gravity
- Weyl notation
- Weyl quantization
- Weyl spinor
- Weyl sum, a type of exponential sum
- Weyl symmetry: see Weyl transformation
- Weyl tensor
- Weyl transform
- Weyl transformation
- Weyl–Schouten theorem
- Weyl's criterion (disambiguation)
- Weyl's lemma on hypoellipticity
- Weyl's lemma on the "very weak" form of the Laplace equation
