= John Wishart (surgeon) =

Canadian surgeon and medical educator (1850–1926)

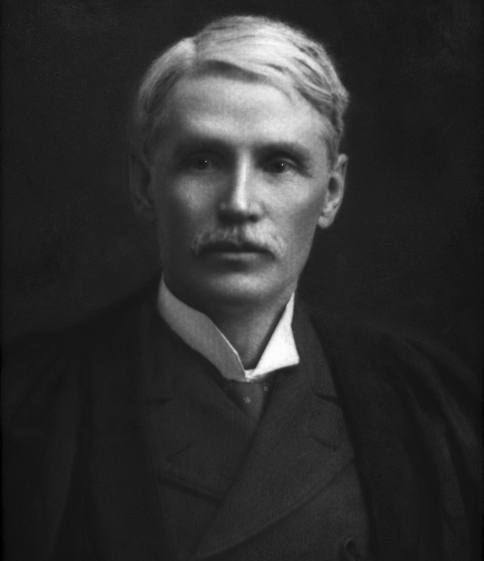
- Wishart c. 1900
- Born: John Wishart; May 27, 1850; Guelph/Eramosa, Ontario, Canada West
- Died: November 6, 1926 (aged 76); London, Ontario
- Education: University of Toronto
- Medical career
- Institutions: University of Western Ontario; St Joseph's Hospital London Ontario

John Wishart (May 27, 1850 – November 6, 1926) was a Canadian surgeon and pioneer medical educator.

Wishart was the first professor of surgery at the University of Western Ontario. He was a pioneer surgical educator in Canada prior to the Flexner Report. Some of his lectures are preserved as student notes by the library at the University of Western Ontario. His resignation after 27 years as Professor of Clinical Surgery may have been due to Flexner's negative comments about the school. Wishart was a founding fellow of the American College of Surgeons. His role at the University of Western Ontario was later taken by Hadley Williams.

Wishart was educated at the University of Toronto at the same time as William Osler. As a young surgeon in 1874, he assisted Abraham Groves in one of the first operations to use modern aseptic technique. In 1886, he performed an appendectomy, becoming an early practitioner of the surgery. Wishart published early articles regarding several surgical procedures, including nephrectomy and strangulated inguinal hernia.

After leaving the University of Western Ontario, he became the founding surgeon-in-chief at the newly built St Joseph's Hospital in London, Ontario. Despite being Presbyterian, he had an excellent relationship with the Catholic Sisters of St. Joseph who ran the hospital.
