= Gruppentheorie und Quantenmechanik =

1928 textbook by Hermann Weyl

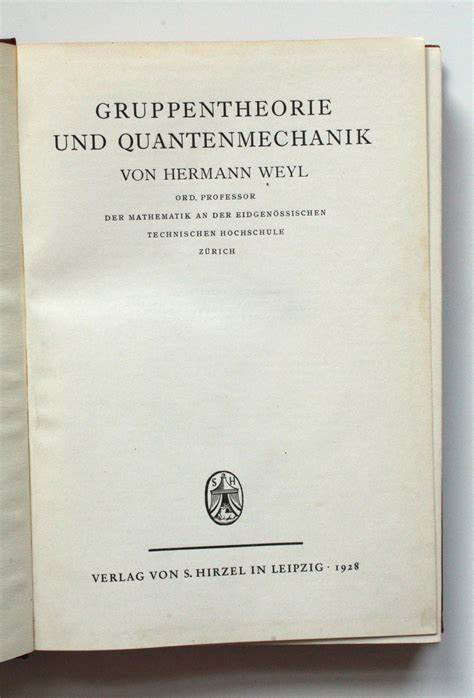
- Title page of Gruppentheorie und Quantenmechanik, 1928
- Author: Hermann Weyl
- Translator: H.P. Robertson (1950; English)
- Language: German; English
- Subjects: Group theory; quantum mechanics
- Publisher: S. Hirzel, Leipzig (1st edition)
- Publication date: 1928 (1st edition in German)
- Pages: 286

Gruppentheorie und Quantenmechanik, or The Theory of Groups and Quantum Mechanics, is a textbook written by Hermann Weyl about the mathematical study of symmetry, group theory, and how to apply it to quantum physics. Weyl expanded on ideas he published in a 1927 paper, basing the text on lectures he gave at the ETH Zurich during the 1927–28 academic year. The first edition was published by S. Hirzel in Leipzig in 1928; a second edition followed in 1931, which was translated into English by Howard P. Robertson. Dover Publications issued a reprint of this translation in 1950.

John Archibald Wheeler wrote of learning quantum mechanics from Weyl's book, "His style is that of a smiling figure on horseback, cutting a clean way through, on a beautiful path, with a swift bright sword." Edward Condon called the text "authoritative". Julian Schwinger said of it, "I read and re-read that book, each time progressing a little farther, but I cannot say that I ever – not even to this day – fully mastered it." The book was one of the first works to give a quantitative statement of the uncertainty principle, which Werner Heisenberg had previously introduced in a less precise way. Weyl credited the idea to Wolfgang Pauli. (Robertson, who later translated Weyl's book into English, cited the argument Weyl gave as the basis for his own generalization of the uncertainty principle to arbitrary noncommuting observables.) Moreover, it contains an early description of density matrices and quantum entanglement, and it uses what quantum information theory would later call the Weyl–Heisenberg group to give a finite-dimensional version of the canonical commutation relation.

Weyl noted that Paul Dirac's relativistic quantum mechanics implied that the electron should have a positively charged anti-particle. The only known particle with a positive charge was the proton, but Weyl was convinced that the anti-electron had to have the same mass as the electron, and physicists had already established that protons are much more massive than electrons. Weyl wrote, "I fear that the clouds hanging over this part of the subject will roll together to form a new crisis in quantum physics." The discrepancy was resolved in 1932 with the discovery of the positron.
