= Helen Thomas Flexner =

American writer and educator (1871–1956)

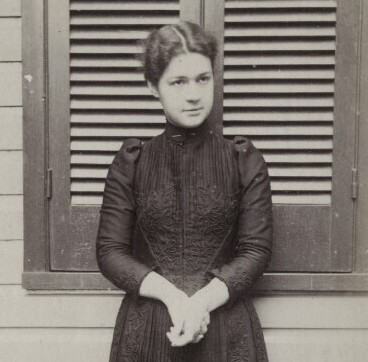
- Born: Helen Whitall Thomas; August 14, 1871; Baltimore, Maryland
- Died: April 6, 1956 (aged 84); New York City
- Education: Bryn Mawr College
- Occupations: Writer, educator
- Spouse: Simon Flexner

Helen Thomas Flexner (August 14, 1871 – April 6, 1956) was an American writer and teacher.

== Biography ==
Flexner née Thomas was born on August 14, 1871, in Baltimore, Maryland. Her family was Quaker. She had nine siblings. She attended Bryn Mawr College, graduating in 1893.

While studying at Bryn Mawr she met Lucy Donnelly with whom she would travel to Europe. Flexner attended classes at the Collège de France, Leipzig University, and the Sorbonne. After several years in Europe Flexner prevailed on her sister M. Carey Thomas (1857–1935) for a job teaching at Bryn Mawr. Both she and Donnelly were hired as instructors in English composition.

In 1903 she married Simon Flexner (1863–1946) with whom she had two children, including the historian James Thomas Flexner (1908–2003).

Her memoir A Quaker Childhood was published in 1940 by Yale University Press.

Flexner died on April 6, 1956, in the New York City. In 1986 James Thomas Flexner's biography of his parents An American saga: the story of Helen Thomas and Simon Flexner was published by Little, Brown and Company.
