= Charles Flexner =

American physician and pharmaceutical scientist

Charles Williams Flexner
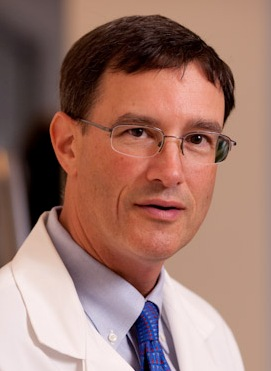
- Occupations: Physician, clinical pharmaceutical scientist, academic, author and researcher
- Title: cology
- Relatives: Simon Flexner

Academic background
- Education: B.S. M.D.
- Alma mater: Stanford University; Johns Hopkins School of Medicine

Charles Williams Flexner is an American physician, clinical pharmaceutical scientist, academic, author and researcher. He is a Professor of Medicine at the Johns Hopkins University School of Medicine.

Flexner's work is focused on the basic and clinical pharmacology of drugs for HIV/AIDS and related infections. He has published over 250 scientific manuscripts, reviews, and book chapters on the use of drugs for the treatment and prevention of HIV and other infectious diseases, this includes early studies of HIV protease inhibitors, and the use of accelerator mass spectrometry to determine drug disposition in humans. He has also authored several books and textbooks, including Protease Inhibitors in AIDS Therapy, Integrative Pharmacology, Antiretroviral Drug Interactions: A Practical Approach, and 2012 DDI: HIV Drug Interaction Guide.

Flexner served as President of the American Federation for Medical Research (AFMR), and the AFMR Foundation.

== Education ==
Flexner received a B.S. degree in biology from Stanford University in 1978, and his M.D. degree from the Johns Hopkins School of Medicine in 1982. He then completed his internship and residency at Stanford University Hospital in 1985, and a laboratory fellowship with virologist Bernard Moss in the Laboratory of Viral Diseases at the National Institute of Allergy and Infectious Diseases (NIAID) in 1988. In the following year, he served as a Clinical Fellow in Infectious Diseases and Clinical Pharmacology at the Johns Hopkins University School of Medicine.

== Career ==
Following his clinical fellowship, Flexner held appointments as an Assistant Professor of Medicine and Assistant Professor of Pharmacology and Molecular Sciences at the Johns Hopkins University School of Medicine from 1989 until 1996. Along with these appointments, he also held a concurrent appointment as Assistant Professor of International Health at the Johns Hopkins University School of Hygiene and Public Health. In 1996, he was appointed as Associate Professor of Medicine, and Associate Professor of Pharmacology and Molecular Sciences at the Johns Hopkins University School of Medicine, and as Associate Professor of International Health at the Johns Hopkins University Bloomberg School of Public Health. In 2005, he was promoted to the position of Professor of Medicine and Professor of Pharmacology and Molecular Sciences at the Johns Hopkins University School of Medicine, and Professor of International Health at the Johns Hopkins University Bloomberg School of Public Health.

== Research ==
Flexner's research currently focuses on the use of long-acting and extended-release drugs and formulations for the treatment and prevention of HIV and other infectious diseases, including tuberculosis and viral hepatitis. He participated in the discovery and clinical development of several new molecules and formulations for immediate-release and long-acting parenteral administration. He founded and directs the Long Acting/Extended Release Antiretroviral Research Resource Program (LEAP),

In his studies regarding treatment of HIV, Flexner was an early advocate of use of ritonavir to enhance the pharmacokinetics of other drugs. He was also an early proponent of using the combination of the integrase inhibitor, cabotegravir, and the non-nucleoside reverse transcriptase inhibitor, rilpivirine, in a long-acting injectable form as an antiretroviral treatment option for people with HIV. As co-founder of the CADO Conferences, he has promoted the optimization of dose and formulation of antiretroviral drugs for more cost-efficient delivery in resource-limited settings. He also introduced drug development strategies for salvage therapy, and discussed the conflicts and solutions regarding this. In 2010, he studied age-related changes in plasma concentrations of the HIV protease inhibitor lopinavir. Results of this study highlighted the potential importance of the pharmacokinetics and tolerability of antiretroviral drugs as the HIV-infected population ages; older individuals comprise an increasing proportion of people living with HIV and AIDS.

Flexner examined human immunodeficiency virus type-1 tropism by conducting a comparative analysis between tropism assays using replication-competent virus and plasma-derived pseudotyped virions. He demonstrated the impact of low-dose ritonavir on the pharmacokinetics of the CXCR4 antagonist AMD070 in healthy volunteers, and found that AMD070 concentrations increased with concomitant ritonavir dosing.

== Personal life ==
Flexner was born in 1956. He is the great-great nephew of the American educator Abraham Flexner, and microbiologist Simon Flexner. He is also a cousin of Pulitzer Prize-winning historian James Thomas Flexner.

== Awards and honors ==
- 1990 - Clinical Investigator Award, National Institute of Allergy and Infectious Diseases, NIH
- 1994 - Leon I. Goldberg Young Investigator Award, American Society for Clinical Pharmacology and Therapeutics
- 1995 - Pfizer Visiting Professor of Medicine and Clinical Pharmacology, Stanford University School of Medicine, Stanford, California.
- 2004 - M. Glenn Koeing Lecturer, Vanderbilt University School of Medicine
- 2006 - Joseph E. Murray Lecturer, American Association of Plastic Surgeons
- 2012 - Honorary Fellow Award, American College of Clinical Pharmacology

== Bibliography ==
=== Books ===
- Protease Inhibitors in AIDS Therapy (2001) ISBN 9780824704612
- HIV Drug Interaction Guide DDI 2012: The Companion Guide to Medical Management of HIV Infection (2012) ISBN 9780983711179

=== Selected articles ===
- Flexner, C; Tierney, C; Gross, R; Andrade, A; Lalama, C; Eshleman, SH; Aberg, J; Sanne, I; Parsons, T; Kashuba, A; Rosenkranz, SL; Kmack, A; Ferguson, E; Dehlinger, M; Mildvan, D (2010). "Comparison of once-daily versus twice-daily combination antiretroviral therapy in treatment-naïve patients: results of AIDS Clinical Trials Group (ACTG) A5073, a 48-week randomized controlled trial". Clinical Infectious Diseases. 50: 1041–1052. doi:10.1086/651118. PMC 2833234. PMID 20192725.
- Bakshi, R. P.; Hamzeh, F.; Frank, I.; Eron, J. J. Jr; Bosch, R. J.; Rosenkranz, S. L.; Cramer, Y. S.; Ussery, M.; Flexner, C. (2007). "Effect of hydroxyurea and dideoxyinosine on intracellular 3'-deoxyadenosine-5'-triphosphate concentrations in HIV-infected patients". AIDS Research and Human Retroviruses. 23 (11): 1360–1365.
- Crawford, K. W.; Li, C.; Keung, A.; Su, Z.; Hughes, M. D.; Greaves, W.; Kuritzkes, D.; Gulick, R.; Flexner, C. (2010). "Pharmacokinetic/pharmacodynamic modeling of the antiretroviral activity of the CCR5 antagonist vicriviroc in treatment experienced HIV-infected subjects (ACTG protocol 5211)". Journal of Acquired Immune Deficiency Syndromes. 53 (5): 598–605.
- Rajoli, R.; Flexner, C.; Chiong, J.; Owen, A.; Donnelly, R. F.; Larrañeta, E.; Siccardi, M. (2019). "Modelling the intradermal delivery of microneedle array patches for long-acting antiretrovirals using PBPK". European Journal of Pharmaceutics and Biopharmaceutics. 144: 101–109.
- Rajoli, R.; Curley, P.; Chiong, J.; Back, D.; Flexner, C.; Owen, A.; Siccardi, M. (2019). "Predicting Drug-Drug Interactions Between Rifampicin and Long-Acting Cabotegravir and Rilpivirine Using Physiologically Based Pharmacokinetic Modeling". The Journal of Infectious Diseases. 219 (11): 1735–1742. doi:10.1093/infdis/jiy726. PMC 6500558.
- Phillips, AN; Bansi-Matharu, L; Cambiano, V; Ehrenkranz, P; Serenata, C; Venter, F; Pett, S; Flexner, C; Jahn, A; Revill, P; Garnett, G (2021). "The potential role of long-acting injectable cabotegravir–rilpivirine in the treatment of HIV in sub-Saharan Africa: a modelling analysis". Lancet Global Health. 9 (5): e620–e627. doi:10.1016/S2214-109X(21)00025-5. PMC 8050198. PMID 33770513.

== See also ==
- Abraham Flexner (1866–1959), American educator
- James Thomas Flexner (1908–2003), American historian and biographer
- Simon Flexner (1863–1946), physician, scientist, administrator, and professor
