= Wyncie King =

American cartoonist

- Born: 1884
- Died: 1961 (aged 76–77); Athens, Greece
- Known for: Illustration; Cartoon; Caricature
- Spouse: Hortense Flexner

Wyncie King (1884–1961) was an American illustrator, cartoonist, and caricaturist.

== Life ==
He was an illustrator for the Louisville Courier-Journal and the Louisville Herald. He married Hortense Flexner (1885–1973).

They moved to Philadelphia. He was a contributor to the Saturday Evening Post. She taught at Bryn Mawr, from 1926 to 1940, and at Sarah Lawrence College from 1942 to 1950. They were friends of Susan Clay Sawitzky, and Martha Gellhorn.

His work is held at the Art Institute of Chicago.

His watercolors are held at The Filson Historical Society. His papers are held at the Archives of American Art. Her papers are held at the University of Louisville.

He died in Athens and is buried at the Sutton Island cemetery.

== Bibliography ==
- Hortense Flexner, Chipper, Frederick A. Stokes, 1941
- Hortense Flexner, Wishing Window, (1942)
- Hortense Flexner, Puzzle Pond, (1948)
