= Louis B. Flexner =

American biochemist

- Born: Louis Barkhouse Flexner; January 7, 1902; Louisville, Kentucky
- Died: March 29, 1996 (aged 94)
- Education: University of Chicago (BS); Johns Hopkins University (MD)
- Known for: Proving that the brain synthesizes proteins rapidly
- Spouse: Josefa B. Flexner
- Parent(s): Ida Barkhouse and Washington Flexner
- Relatives: Simon Flexner, Abraham Flexner (uncles)
- Scientific career
- Fields: Biochemistry of memory
- Workplaces: University of Pennsylvania; Johns Hopkins University

Louis Barkhouse Flexner (January 7, 1902 – March 29, 1996) was an American biochemist, a researcher into the biochemistry of memory. Flexner proved, among other things, that the brain synthesized proteins at a much faster rate than had been widely held before him. He also established a link between protein synthesis and the brain's functions of learning and memory. Flexner was a member of the National Academy of Sciences, the founding director of the Institute of Neurological Sciences at the University of Pennsylvania, chair of anatomy at the University of Pennsylvania, a member of the American Academy of Arts and Sciences and a member of the American Philosophical Society. The National Academies Press called him "a major scientific figure".

== Awards and Distinctions ==
- election to the National Academy of Sciences (1964)
- election to the American Academy of Arts and Sciences
- election to the American Philosophical Society
- a member of the American Society of Biological Chemists
- a member of the American Association of Anatomists (secretary-treasurer from 1956 to 1964
- The Democratic National Committee named him to a newly created Advisory Council on Technology in 1959
- served on scientific boards of the U.S. Public Health Service, United Cerebral Palsy Association, National Council to Combat Blindness, National Research Council, National Paraplegic Society, and the National Foundation for Infantile Paralysis
- the Weinstein Award in 1957
- In 1974 he was awarded an honorary degree (Doctor of Laws) by the University of Pennsylvania
- UPenn tribute established the Louis B. Flexner Lectureship

== Career and life ==
Flexner graduated from the University of Chicago with a B.S. degree in 1923 and from Johns Hopkins University with a M.D. degree in 1927.
