= Josefa B. Flexner =

Italian-born American scientist (1903–2000)

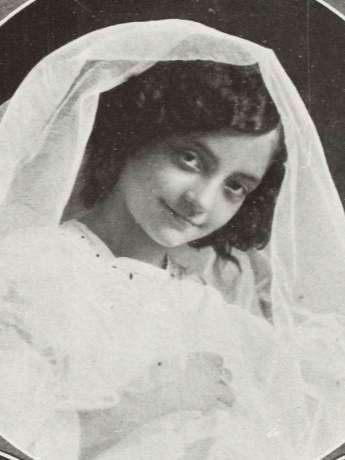
- Born: 1904; Barcelona, Spain
- Died: June 25, 2000 (aged 95–96); Philadelphia, Pennsylvania, United States
- Education: Johns Hopkins University
- Spouse: Louis B. Flexner
- Scientific career
- Fields: Neuroscience
- Institutions: Johns Hopkins University; University of Pennsylvania

Josefa Barba Gosé, also known as Pepita Barba or Josefa B. Flexner (1903 or 1904 – June 25, 2000), was a Spanish scientist who went into exile in 1937 during the Spanish Civil War and moved to the United States, where she lived much of her life integrated into American society.

== Biography ==
Born into a distinguished family, Flexner studied Pharmacy and Law. She pursued Pharmacy out of scientific vocation and Law as a personal challenge in relation to her brother Eduardo. What she truly enjoyed about her Pharmacy studies was laboratory research. In 1926, at the age of twenty-two, she moved to Madrid, where she settled in the prestigious Residencia de Señoritas. There, she had access to an advanced and well-equipped chemistry laboratory, created by her first director, the American biochemist Mary Foster, in 1920.

In 1927, she returned to Barcelona and began working at the Institute of Physiology of Barcelona with Augusto Pi Suñer and Jesús María Bellido y Golferichs. Through the Board for the Expansion of Studies and Scientific Research (JAE), presided over by Santiago Ramón y Cajal, she applied for a scholarship to continue her studies in the United Kingdom. She was awarded a scholarship to the Royal Pharmaceutical Society of Great Britain from December 1928 to August 1929.

After returning from England and presenting her doctoral thesis in Madrid in 1929, she became a member of the Royal Spanish Society of Physics and Chemistry. In the early 1930s, she applied for another scholarship to further her studies, this time from the philanthropic institution founded by the patron Rafael Patxot y Jubert, named after his prematurely deceased daughter: the María Patxot y Rabell Foundation. This financial aid allowed her to move to the United States, specifically to enhance her knowledge at the Johns Hopkins School of Medicine in Baltimore. During her time in Baltimore, she met American neurophysiologist Louis Flexner (1902–1996), with whom she established a friendship that later developed into a romantic and professional relationship. After completing her specialization studies in Baltimore, Barba-Gosé returned to Barcelona in 1932.

After being a young promise of the so-called Catalan biological school, in July 1937, Barba-Gosé fled the civil war by clandestinely crossing the Pyrenees. Together with Louis, whom she already married, she moved to the United States, where she began a new personal and scientific life. She started working at Johns Hopkins University alongside her husband, adopting his surname, and developed a fruitful scientific career.

Many of her scientific achievements in the field of neurophysiology did not come until 1951 when they moved to Philadelphia to work at the University of Pennsylvania. Two years later, they founded the prestigious Institute of Neurological Sciences, directed by Louis Flexner. After fifty-nine years of shared life and research, Louis Flexner died in April 1996, and Barba-Gosé passed away four years later in 2000, at the age of ninety-seven. The story of her life went largely unnoticed throughout the twentieth century. It was not until the end of the first decade of the twenty-first century that Pepita Barba's name appeared in the memoirs of Núria Pi Suñer, the niece of August Pi Suñer, who directed Barba-Gosé during her time at the Institute of Physiology of Barcelona.
