= Fritz Joachim Weyl =

Swiss mathematician (1915–1977)

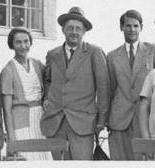
1932 near Göttingen, with his mother Helene (left) and father Hermann (mid)

Fritz Joachim Weyl (February 19, 1915 – July 20, 1977) was a mathematician born in Zurich, Switzerland. He contributed to mathematics research and taught at several universities, most notably at George Washington University in Washington, D.C.

== Early life ==
Fritz Joachim Weyl was the son of mathematician Hermann Weyl and the author and translator Helene Weyl. Fritz received his Bachelor of Arts degree from Swarthmore College in 1935. At Princeton University, Fritz received a master's degree in 1937 and a Ph.D. in 1939. His Ph.D. thesis at Princeton was entitled Analytic Curves. Salomon Bochner served as his thesis advisor and oversaw his research while Fritz was studying at Princeton.

== Career ==
Weyl taught at a number of different universities during his life. These include the University of Illinois; the University of Maryland, College Park; Indiana University; and George Washington University. In addition to teaching, Weyl was employed as a research analyst by the U.S. government. He went on to serve as the dean of science and mathematics at Hunter College in New York City.

Weyl served as the president of the Society for Industrial and Applied Mathematics (SIAM) from 1960 to 1961.

== Other work ==
Both Fritz Joachim Weyl and his father Hermann Weyl published mathematical research. In the 1970s, Constance Reid wrote books about David Hilbert and Richard Courant, where Hermann Weyl is mentioned many times while Fritz is mentioned only once, on page 381 in the volume about Courant. In 1949, Hermann published a book entitled Philosophy of Mathematics and Natural Science. This work was originally published by Princeton University Press. Fritz and Hermann published a book together called Meromorphic Functions and Analytic Curves. This work is believed to be based on notes from a course given at the Institute for Advanced Study during the first term of 1942–1943. While Fritz was working for the U.S. government, he compiled what is known as Research in the service of national purpose; proceedings of the Office of Naval Research Vicennial Convocation, in 1966. This work is available at the National Museum of American History located at the Smithsonian. Also, many researchers have cited Weyl's work when conducting their own. For example, his work is cited as a reference in the publication The Philosophical Review.

When Fritz died on July 20, 1977, the mathematics community considered the loss devastating. On October 8, 1977, the board of trustees for the Society for Industrial and Applied Mathematics (SIAM) issued a memoriam. In part, it read: "...in warm recognition of his enduring vision for both the beauties and the practicalities of applied mathematics...the members and officers of SIAM and SIMS offer their heartfelt tribute".
