= Hortense Flexner =

American poet

Hortense Flexner King (April 12, 1885 – September 28, 1973) was an American poet, playwright, and professor.

== Life ==
She attended Bryn Mawr College. She graduated from the University of Michigan, with a B.A. in 1907, and a M.A. in 1910. She worked for the Louisville Herald. She worked with her sisters, Jennie Maas Flexner and Carolyn A. Flexner, in getting the vote out in Louisville when Kentucky women won the right to vote in school board elections in 1912.

She married Wyncie King (1884–1961). They moved to Philadelphia. He was a contributor to the Saturday Evening Post. She taught at Bryn Mawr, from 1926 to 1940, and at Sarah Lawrence College from 1942 to 1950. They were friends of Susan Clay Sawitzky, and Martha Gellhorn.

In 1961, she returned to Louisville. Marguerite Yourcenar translated her poetry into French.

Her papers are held at the University of Louisville.

She is buried alongside her husband in the Sutton Island Cemetery, in Cranberry Isles, Maine.

== Works ==
Poetry

- Clouds and Cobblestones 1920.
- The Stubborn Root and Other Poems (1930)
- North Window and Other Poems (1943)
- Poems (1961)
- Selected Poems (1963), with an introduction by English poet Laurie Lee
- Marguerite Yourcenar (ed.) Presentation Critique d'Hortense Flexner Suivie d'un Choix de Poems (1969),
- The Selected Poems of Hortense Flexner (1975)
- Half a Star: Poems by Hortense Flexner

Plays

- Voices (1916)
- Mahogany (1921)
- The Faun (1921)
- The Broken God
- The Road
- The Little Miracle
- Three Wise Men of Gotham
