= Helene Weyl =

German translator

Friederike Bertha Helene Weyl
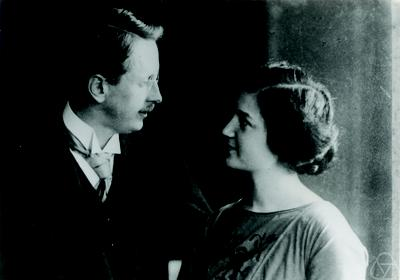
- Hermann and Helene Weyl (1913)
- Born: 30 March 1893; Ribnitz, Germany
- Died: June 1948 (aged 55); Princeton, New Jersey
- Occupations: Writer and translator
- Spouse: Hermann Weyl

Friederike Bertha Helene Weyl (née Joseph; 30 March 1893 – June 1948) was a German writer and translator. She was married to the mathematician Hermann Weyl.

== Life ==
Weyl was born on 30 March 1893 in Ribnitz, Germany. She was the daughter of the Jewish country doctor Bruno Joseph (1861–1934) and his wife Bertha. Her father was born in Pomerania, and her mother came from a well-established Mecklenburg family. Weyl and her younger sister were raised atheists.

When Weyl was fourteen, her parents sent her to a Realgymnasium in Berlin. There she discovered an interest in theatre and became acquainted with the actress Tilla Durieux. After graduating from high school, Weyl returned to Mecklenburg and studied German and history at the University of Rostock.

Through Emil Utitz, who taught at the university, Weyl was introduced to the study of phenomenology. She pursued this subject at the University of Göttingen with a minor in mathematics. During her first semester, she met her future husband Hermann Weyl, who worked at the university as a private lecturer.

Weyl also formed a close friendship with Arnold Zweig, who was 25 years old at that time. Between 1912 and 1939 there was a long exchange of letters between the Zweig couple and Helene Weyl, fragments of which have been preserved. These letters appeared in 1996 under the title Komm her, wir lieben dich – Briefe einer ungewöhnlichen Freundschaft zu dritt ("Come here, we love you - Letters of an unusual friendship between three people"). Weyl and Zweig's wife Beatrice became the models for the main character in Zweig's short stories about Claudia.

Hermann Weyl was appointed professor at ETH Zurich and the couple moved there in 1913. Helene continued to attend mathematical lectures until the birth of her first son Fritz Joachim Weyl (19 February 1915 – 20 July 1977). When her husband was drafted into the German army in 1916, she returned to her parents' house in Ribnitz for a short time. A year later, at the request of the Swiss government, Hermann was released from military service, and both were able to return to Zürich. In the fall of 1917, their second son Michael was born. Since the First World War, many German intellectuals had fled to Switzerland, and she came into contact with many scientists, writers, and actors including Albert Einstein, Elisabeth Bergner, William Dieterle and Walter Dällenbach (1892–1990).

In 1922, Hermann Weyl received invitations to lecture in Madrid and Barcelona, and the couple went to Spain for three months. The trip, and her acquaintances there, shaped her so much that, from that time, she dealt intensively with Romance languages and especially Spanish. She got in touch with the Spanish philosopher José Ortega y Gasset and translated several of his books into German. She was attracted by Ortega's philosophical ideas, his brilliant style and the challenge of translating language nuances and the foreign Spanish into German. She also translated works by Arthur Stanley Eddington and James Jeans from English into German and, during his time in Princeton, set about translating Ortega's essays into English. Ortega y Gasset commented on his translator in the fourth volume of his Collected Works from 1956:

"More than fifteen editions [of Ortega y Gasset's work] have appeared in just a few years. The case would be incomprehensible if four-fifths of it could not be attributed to the successful translation. My translator Helene Weyl . . . pushed the grammatical tolerance of the German language to its limit in order to translate exactly what is not German in my way of speaking."

In 1930, Hermann Weyl accepted a teaching position in Göttingen. After the Nazis came to power in Germany, the family accepted a position at Princeton University, in the United States.

After a long illness with cancer, Weyl died in Princeton in 1948.

== Works (Selection) ==
- Arnold Zweig, Beatrice Zweig, and Helene Weyl (1996), Ilse Lange (ed.), Komm her, wir lieben dich – Briefe einer ungewöhnlichen Freundschaft zu dritt, Berlin: Aufbau, ISBN 3-351-03439-3
- Andalusische Reiseblätter (1923)
- Die Ausgrabungen in den Kalifenschlössern bei Cordoba (1923)

=== Translations from Spanish to German ===
- Correspondencia: José Ortega y Gasset y Helene Weyl, Ediciones Tharpa España, 2008, ISBN 978-84-9742-839-2
- José Ortega y Gasset (2007), Der Aufstand der Massen, Biblioteca Nueva, ISBN 978-3-421-06503-2
- José Ortega y Gasset (1937), Stern und Unstern, Stuttgart: Deutsche Verlagsanstalt
- José Ortega y Gasset (1934), Buch des Betrachters, Stuttgart: Deutsche Verlags-Anstalt
- José Ortega y Gasset (1933), Über die Liebe, Dt. Verlag-Anst., ISBN 3-421-06187-4
- Pedro Antonio de Alarcón, Der Dreispitz
- Pedro Antonio de Alarcón (1926), Der Cid in der Geschichte

=== Translations from English to German ===
- Arthur Eddington (1933), Dehnt sich das Weltall aus?
- James Jeans (1934), Die neuen Grundlagen der Naturerkenntnis
- James Jeans (1934), Die Wunderwelt der Sterne
- James Jeans (1936), Durch Raum und Zeit
- Hermann Weyl (1948), Mathematik und die Naturgesetze
