= Commercial High School (disambiguation) =

Commercial High School may refer to:

- Commercial High School, Atlanta, Georgia
- Commercial High School (New Orleans)
- Commercial High School, a now-defunct school in Brooklyn, New York City, New York, now the site of Paul Robeson High School for Business and Technology
- Girl's Commercial High School, a now-defunct school in Brooklyn, New York City, New York, now the site of Prospect Heights High School

== See also ==
- High School of Commerce
