= High School of Commerce =

High School of Commerce may refer to the following schools:

== Canada ==
- High School of Commerce (Ottawa)

== United States ==
- High School of Commerce (Detroit), 1922–1964
- High School of Commerce (San Francisco)
- High School of Commerce (Massachusetts), in Springfield

== See also ==
- Commercial High School, Atlanta, Georgia
- Commercial High School (New Orleans)
