= Wave mechanics =

Wave mechanics may refer to:

- the mechanics of waves
- the application of the quantum wave equation, especially in position and momentum spaces
- the resonant interaction of three or more waves, which includes the "three-wave equation"

== See also ==
- Quantum mechanics
- Wave equation
- Quantum state
- Matter wave
