= Bernard Flexner =

American lawyer and Zionist leader

- Born: February 24, 1865; Louisville, Kentucky, U.S.
- Died: May 3, 1945 (aged 80)
- Occupation: Lawyer
- Known for: Leader in the Zionist Organization of America; co-founder of the Palestine Economic Corporation; co-founder of the Council on Foreign Relations
- Relatives: Abraham Flexner (brother); Simon Flexner (brother)

Bernard Flexner (February 24, 1865 – May 3, 1945) was a New York lawyer and a prominent member of the Zionist Organization of America.

== Early life ==
Flexner was born in Louisville, Kentucky to a family that immigrated from Europe in the early 1860s. His father was Morris Flexner and his mother Esther Abraham. Among his siblings were Abraham Flexner, author of the Flexner Report on medical education in the United States and founder of the Institute for Advanced Study, and Simon Flexner, first director of the Rockefeller Institute.

== Education ==
He was educated in the Louisville public schools, earned a Bachelor of Laws degree from the University of Louisville, and later continued his legal studies in the Law Department of the University of Virginia.

== Career ==
He was admitted to the Kentucky bar in 1898. He practiced law until 1914, when he became active in public activity. He was chair of a Juvenile court board in Louisville and in 1917 participated in a Red cross delegation to Romania. He served as counsel for the Zionist delegation to the Paris Peace Conference (1918–1919) and in 1925 he was one of the founders of the Palestine Economic Corporation (PEC). He served as president of PEC until 1931 and afterwards was chairman of the director council of the PEC.

He was one of the founders of the Council on Foreign Relations.

His papers are held in the Seeley G. Mudd Manuscript Library at Princeton University.

== Writings ==
- Due Process of Law, University of Louisville Law School, 1898.
- A Decade of the Juvenile Court, 1910.
- Juvenile Courts and Probation, Century Company, 1914.
- The Rights to a Jewish Home Land, The Nation, October 2, 1929.
- The Child. The Family, and the Court, U.S. Government Printing Office, 1929.
- The Fight on the Securities Act, 1934.
- Mr. Justice Brandeis and the University of Louisville, University of Louisville, 1938.
