= Mary Foster (biochemist) =

American biochemist, research chemist and educator

Mary Louise Foster
- Born: April 20, 1865; Melrose, Massachusetts
- Died: June 21, 1960 (aged 95)
- Education: Smith College; University of Chicago (Ph.D.)
- Scientific career
- Fields: Biochemistry
- Workplaces: Lab of Physiology and Chemistry (New York), Columbia University, Smith College, Institute for Girls in Spain, Santiago College

Mary Louise Foster (April 20, 1865 – June 21, 1960) was an American biochemist, research chemist and educator.

== Education ==
Mary Louise Foster was born on April 20, 1865, in Melrose, Massachusetts. Between the years of 1878–1883, she attended the Girls' Latin School in Boston, Massachusetts, and later went on to study Classics at Smith College from 1888 to 1891. After her graduation, Foster taught Chemistry and Physics at West Roxbury High School while enrolled at the Massachusetts Institute of Technology in Boston (1893–1895). In 1912, she received her master's degree from Smith, and two years later earned her PhD from the University of Chicago. She spent the summer of 1917 at the Rockefeller Institute for Medical Research.

== Career ==
In 1898, Foster found work teaching chemistry at Lynn High and Classical School. The next year, she became an assistant researcher in the Lab of Physiology and Chemistry in New York, where she stayed until 1901. In 1903, Foster worked as a research chemist in the department of pharmacology at Columbia University, where she stayed on until 1907. Concurrent with her research, she was also a professor in the chemistry department at the Woman's Medical College of New York (1904-1905). After working at Columbia University, Foster was appointed as an instructor and later associate professor at Smith College, where she played a major role in introducing the field of biochemistry to the curriculum. She offered the first biochemistry course during 1916-17, and with the exception of the semesters she was on sabbatical leave, taught this and other biochemistry courses until her retirement in 1933.

In 1920, she was offered the position of Director at the International Institute for Girls in Spain, located in Madrid. She stayed there for two years, before returning to Smith as the Chairman of the Committee on Interdepartmental Majors, a position she held until 1927. In 1928, she was appointed a member of the Special Honors Committee. From 1930 to 1932, Foster returned to lab she helped to establish in Spain to work as the lab organizer. Following her second brief tenure at the Institute, she then relocated to Santiago College in Chile to work as the Director of New Laboratories in Chemistry and Physics. It was there that she did the majority of her most notable research, publishing numerous times and delivering several lectures in her field.

== Selected publications ==
- The absorption spectra of glycine solutions and their interpretation (1933)
- The influence of substituent groups on the visible and ultra-violet absorption spectra of amino acids and related substances (1932)
- The visible and ultra-violet absorption spectra of certain amino acids and their significance (1931)
- A study of some of the chemical characteristics and the absorption spectrum of cystine (1930)
- Studies on a method for the quantitative estimation of certain groups in phospholipins (1915)
- A Preliminary Study of the Biochemical Activity of Bacillus lactis erythrogenes (1913)
- Comparative Study of Metabolism of Pneumococcus, Streptococcus, Bacillus lactis erythrogenes and Bacillus anthracoides (1913)
