= Weyl's postulate =

Concept in cosmology

In relativistic cosmology, Weyl's postulate stipulates that in the Friedmann model of the universe (a fluid cosmological model), the world lines of fluid particles (modeling galaxies) should be hypersurface orthogonal. Meaning, they should form a 3-bundle of non-intersecting geodesics orthogonal to a series of spacelike hypersurfaces (hyperslices).

Sometimes, the additional hypothesis is added that the world lines form timelike geodesics.

== Intuitive significance ==
The ADM formalism introduced a family of spatial hyperslices. This allows us to think of the geometry of "space" as evolving over "time". This is an attractive viewpoint, but in general no such family of hyperslices will be physically preferred. The Weyl hypothesis can be understood as the assumption that we should consider only cosmological models in which there is such a preferred slicing, namely the one given by taking the unique hyperslices orthogonal to the world lines of the fluid particles.

One consequence of this hypothesis is that if it holds true, we can introduce a comoving chart such that the metric tensor contains no terms of form dt dx, dt dy, or dt dz.

The additional hypothesis that the world lines of the fluid particles be geodesics is equivalent to assuming that no body forces act within the fluid. In other words, the fluid has zero pressure, so that we are considering a dust solution.

== Relation to vorticity ==
The condition that the congruence corresponding to the fluid particles should be hypersurface orthogonal is by no means assured. A generic congruence does not possess this property, which is in fact mathematically equivalent to stipulating that the congruence of world lines should be vorticity-free. That is, they should not be twisting about one another, or in other words, the fluid elements should not be swirling about their neighbors in the manner of the fluid particles in a stirred cup of some liquid. (Nonzero vorticity model is presented in https://arxiv.org/ftp/arxiv/papers/1210/1210.4091.pdf or Nurgaliev I.S. «Singularities Are Averted by Vortices». Gravitation and Cosmology, 2010, Vol. 16, No. 4, pp. 313–315.)

== See also ==
- Comoving coordinates
- Congruence (general relativity), for the relation between vorticity and hypersurfaces.
- Friedmann–Lemaître–Robertson–Walker metric for the best known cosmological model (which does obey Weyl's hypothesis)
- Shape of the universe
- Weyl curvature hypothesis, for a different cosmological hypothesis due to Roger Penrose.
