= James Thomas Flexner =

American historian and biographer

- Born: January 13, 1908; Manhattan, New York, New York
- Died: February 13, 2003 (aged 95); New York City
- Education: Harvard University
- Occupation: Writer
- Spouse: Beatrice Hudson Flexner
- Children: 1
- Parent: Simon Flexner
- Writing career
- Period: 1937–1996
- Genres: History, biography

James Thomas Flexner (January 13, 1908 – February 13, 2003) was an American historian and biographer best known for the four-volume biography of George Washington that earned him a National Book Award in Biography and a special Pulitzer Prize. His one-volume abridgment, Washington: the Indispensable Man (1974) was the basis of two television miniseries, George Washington (1984) and George Washington II: The Forging of a Nation (1986), starring Barry Bostwick as Washington.

== Biography ==
James Thomas Flexner was born January 13, 1908, in Manhattan. His father was Simon Flexner, a sixth-grade dropout who became a self-taught microbiologist, pathologist, director of the Rockefeller Institute for Medical Research in New York City and discoverer of a cure for spinal meningitis. His mother was Helen Thomas [Flexner], a professor of English at Bryn Mawr whose sister was president of the college. In 1929, Flexner graduated cum laude from Harvard University, and found work as a reporter for the New York Herald Tribune. In 1931, he took a position at the New York City Department of Health as an executive secretary. The following year, he left his job to devote his full energies to writing. Although untrained in art history, he gravitated to art subjects as part of his interest in writing about American history.

Flexner is known best for George Washington, a four-volume biography published by Little, Brown from 1965 to 1972. He won a special Pulitzer Prize for the work in 1973. He wrote other historical biographies, including The Young Hamilton (on Alexander Hamilton), Mohawk Baronet (on Sir William Johnson, 1st Baronet), and The Traitor and the Spy: Benedict Arnold and John André. He wrote many books on the history of American art, including a highly regarded life of the American painter John Singleton Copley. He and his father, Simon Flexner, M.D., co-wrote William Henry Welch and the Heroic Age of American Medicine (1941). (His uncle, Abraham Flexner, was the educator whose 1910 report led to the reform of United States medical schools.)

Flexner died February 13, 2003, at his apartment in New York City at the age of 95.

== Works ==
- Doctors on Horseback: Pioneers of American Medicine. New York: Viking Press, 1937.
- America's Old Masters: First Artists of the New World. New York: The Viking Press, 1939.
- History of American Painting Volume 1: First Flowers of Our Wilderness. Boston: Houghton Mifflin Harcourt, 1947.
- John Singleton Copley. Boston: Houghton Mifflin Harcourt, 1948.
- A Short History of American Painting. Boston: Houghton Mifflin Harcourt, 1950.
- The Traitor and the Spy: Benedict Arnold and John Andre. New York: Houghton Mifflin Harcourt, 1953.
- History of American Painting Volume 2: The Light of Distant Skies, 1760–1835. New York: Houghton Mifflin Harcourt, 1954.
- Gilbert Stuart; a Great Life in Brief New York: Knopf, 1955.
- The Pocket History of American Painting. Pocket Library, 1957.
- History of American Painting Volume 3: That Wilder Image; the Painting of America's Native School. Boston: Little, Brown and Company, 1962.
- Paintings on the Century's Walls. New York: Century Association, 1963.
- George Washington, the Forge of Experience, 1732–1775. Boston: Little, Brown and Company, 1965.
- The World of Winslow Homer 1836–1910. New York: Time, Inc., 1966.
- George Washington in the American Revolution, 1775–1783. Boston: Little, Brown and Company, 1968.
- The Double Adventure of John Singleton Copley. Boston: Little, Brown and Company, 1969.
- George Washington and the New Nation, 1783–1793. Boston: Little, Brown and Company, 1970.
- Nineteenth Century American Painting. New York: Putnam, 1970.
- George Washington, Anguish and Farewell, 1793–1799. Boston: Little, Brown and Company, 1972.
- Washington: the Indispensable Man. Boston: Little, Brown and Company, 1974.
- The Face of Liberty: Founders of the United States. Clarkson N. Potter, 1975.
- Steamboats Come True: American Inventors in Action. Boston: Little, Brown and Company, 1978.
- The Young Hamilton: A Biography. Boston: Little, Brown and Company, 1978.
- States Dyckman: American Loyalist. Boston: Little, Brown and Company, 1980.
- Time-Life Library of Art: The World of Winslow Homer. New York: Time-Life Books, 1980.
- Asher B. Durand: An Engraver's and a Farmer's Art. Yonkers: The Hudson River Museum, 1983.
- An American Saga: The Story of Helen Thomas and Simon Flexner. Boston: Little, Brown and Company, 1984.
- Lord of the Mohawks A Biography of Sir William Johnson. Boston: Little, Brown and Company, 1984.
- Maverick's Progress: An Autobiography. New York: Fordham University Press, 1996.
- Random Harvest. New York: Fordham University Press, 1998.

== See also ==
- Abraham Flexner (1866–1959), American educator
- Charles Flexner (born 1956), American physician, clinical pharmaceutical scientist, academic, author and researcher
- Simon Flexner (1863–1946), physician, scientist, administrator, and professor
