= Eleanor Flexner =

American independent scholar and pioneer of the field of women's studies (1908–1995)

- Born: October 4, 1908; Georgetown, Kentucky
- Died: March 25, 1995 (aged 86); Westborough, Massachusetts
- Education: Somerville College, Oxford
- Occupations: Writer, Historian, Activist
- Known for: Century of Struggle: The Woman's Rights Movement in the United States

Eleanor Flexner (October 4, 1908 – March 25, 1995) was an American independent scholar and pioneer in what was to become the field of women's studies. Her book Century of Struggle: The Woman's Rights Movement in the United States, originally published in 1959, relates women's work for the vote to other 19th- and early 20th-century social, labor, and reform movements, most importantly the push for equal education, the abolition of slavery, and temperance laws.

== Family ==
Flexner was the younger of two daughters of well-known parents. Her mother, Anne Crawford Flexner (1874–1955), a successful playwright and children's author, organized professional playwrights into an association that later became the Dramatists Guild of the Author's League of America.

Eleanor's father, Abraham Flexner (1866–1959), with his brother Simon Flexner at the Rockefeller Institute, worked on the reform of early 20th-century medical education and medical research in the United States and Canada. Abraham founded and served as first director of the Institute for Advanced Study in Princeton, New Jersey.

Eleanor's sister, Jean Flexner, became one of the first employees of the Division of Labor Standards in Washington, DC.

Encouragement and financial assistance from her parents carried Flexner through the Great Depression and gave her the means to experiment as a playwright and social organizer. Her mother at her death left Eleanor a lifetime income. Both Anne and Abraham Flexner were feminists who supported passage of the Nineteenth Amendment to the United States Constitution and both marched in the 1915 New York woman suffrage parade.

She died of a stroke on March 25, 1995, at age 86.

== Career ==
Flexner was born in Georgetown, Kentucky, but spent her youth in New York City. A biographical statement in the Schlesinger Library Archives at Harvard University outlines Flexner's early career:

After graduating from Swarthmore College with high honors in English and history in 1930, she attended Somerville College at Oxford University for one year. Back in the United States, she held a series of promotional and editorial positions in the theater and with the Institute of Propaganda Analysis, the Foreign Policy Association, and Hadassah. In 1938 she published a book of dramatic criticism entitled American Playwrights, 1918-1938.

During this period of her life Flexner found her way into New York's radical left. She joined the Communist Party in 1936 and spent several years writing CP articles and pamphlets, under pseudonyms, and working for various social and political causes. As a member of the League of American Writers, she served on its Keep America Out of War Committee in January 1940 during the period of the Hitler-Stalin pact. She worked alongside the National Association of Colored Graduate Nurses. In 1946, she became the executive director of the Congress of American Women This activist background allowed Flexner to appreciate the disappointments, triumphs, and bracing camaraderie experienced by the 19th- and early 20th-century women whom she later described in Century of Struggle.

In the 1940s, Flexner began researching the 19th-century labor struggles of American women but found that few historians had touched on the subject. She was by that time already planning to write a history of the American woman suffrage movement and gradually became convinced that a comprehensive treatment must deal with the experiences of working-class women and politically active women of color. Flexner worked on the manuscript that was to become Century of Struggle through most of the 1950s. Her original publisher, Harper, refused to publish it unless she removed the parts about women of color. Fortunately, when she showed the completed book to the historian Arthur Schlesinger, he recognized its value and urged her to offer it to Harvard University Press, which readily accepted it for publication. It was published in 1959.

Many of the concepts that inform Century of Struggle were developed by a small group of Marxist women — including, in addition to Flexner, Susan B. Anthony II, Gerda Lerner, and Eve Merriam. It was only in 1982, however, that Flexner publicly acknowledged her past membership in the Communist Party.

In 1957, Flexner moved from New York to Northampton, Massachusetts, where her life partner, Helen Terry, was on the faculty of Smith College. Flexner completed Century of Struggle and wrote her last book, Mary Wollstonecraft, in this setting.

== Major work ==
- American Playwrights, 1918-1938: The Theatre Retreats from Reality, (1938, 1966; reprinted in 1969 with a new preface by Eleanor Flexnor).
- Century of Struggle: The Women's Rights Movement in the United States, (1959, expanded edition 1975; enlarged edition 1996 co-authored with Ellen Fitzpatrick, who also wrote a biographically valuable foreword).
- Mary Wollstonecraft: A Biography (1972).

== Capsule summaries of Flexner's books ==
=== American Playwrights, 1918-1938: The Theater Retreats From Reality ===
From Flexner's 1969 preface:

When this book was first published the world thought it had escaped a second great war by the agreement at Munich, which recognized Adolf Hitler's conquest of Czechoslovakia. The last Spanish Republican resistance to Franco was crumbling, and the Japanese had only recently invaded China.

But the gap between that time and today is even wider and deeper than these news items might suggest. My generation spent its early adult years looking for work when there were no jobs — quite simply no jobs at all, either for them or for their elders. Millions of people who had known ten or twenty years of security were suddenly reduced to joblessness. Nor were there any cushions against acute need, such as unemployment insurance or social security… Establishing such minimal bulwarks against hunger and homelessness as trade unions and social insurance were the elemental concerns of a generation of American workers…

Social concern was one of the principal yardsticks against which I measured the work of the leading playwrights of the twenties and thirties.

Plays evaluated in American Playwrights are by dramatists Sidney Howard, S.N. Behrman, Maxwell Anderson, Eugene O'Neill, by comedy writer George S. Kaufman (variously collaborating with Marc Connelly, Edna Ferber, Moss Hart, Herman Mankiewicz, Morrie Ryskind, Howard Dietz, Katherine Dayton, and others), and by comedy writers George Kelly, Rachel Crothers, Philip Barry, and Robert E. Sherwood.

In the penultimate chapter, "The New Realism," brief attention is given to Susan Glaspell, Arthur Richman, Elmer Rice, Sophie Treadwell, John Howard Lawson, Paul Green, Paul & Claire Sifton, George Sklar & Albert Maltz, Paul Peters & George Sklar, John Wexley, Clifford Odets, Albert Bein, Irwin Shaw, Emanuel Eisenberg, Sidney Kingsley, Marc Blitzstein, and Ben Bengal.

Flexner regrets in her 1969 preface to the book that she did not include Lorraine Hansberry, Arthur Miller, and Lillian Hellman among the playwrights singled out for special notice.

=== Century of Struggle: The Women's Rights Movement in the United States ===
Century of Struggle, originally published in 1959, was the first authoritative narrative of the woman's rights movement. It became a point of departure for generations of historians who built the field of women's history. Professor Ellen Carol DuBois (UCLA) wrote in 1991 that Century of Struggle "has stood for thirty years as the most comprehensive history of American feminism up to the enfranchisement of women in 1920." Ellen Fitzpatrick (University of New Hampshire), another leading scholar and co-author of the 1996 enlarged edition, wrote:

There is a timelessness about [Century of Struggle] that transcends the historical forces that shaped its construction as a work of history… [I]t endures not just as a penetrating and learned study but as a work that contributed to the continued effort to enlarge the scope and deepen the foundation of history. [Century of Struggle] offers readers not only a detailed and compelling account of the women's rights crusade but also an overview of women's historical experience from the Colonial period onward.

The book covers the woman's rights movement from Anne Hutchinson in the 17th century through the ratification of the Nineteenth Amendment, which ensured women's right to vote. For the book, Flexner interviewed Clara Lemlich Shavelson and the granddaughter of Leonora Barry, and did significant original research in the Library of Congress and the Sophia Smith Collection of Women's History at Smith College.

=== Mary Wollstonecraft: A Biography ===
Mary Wollstonecraft Godwin (1759–1797) was an English feminist, writer, and philosopher. There are at least three sources of her continuing renown in Britain and America: She is the author of A Vindication of the Rights of Woman (1792). She opposed the eminent Edmund Burke's views concerning the French Revolution in her A Vindication of the Rights of Men (1790) and was present in Paris in 1793 when England and France declared war. Finally, she is the mother of Mary Wollstonecraft Godwin Shelley, who wrote Frankenstein, or the Modern Prometheus (1818).

In this classic biography, which has not been reprinted, Flexner recounts the glories and miseries of Wollstonecraft's childhood and professional life. She describes Wollstonecraft's crushing self-doubt and unstable temperament, as well as her capacity for hard work even in times of significant adversity. Drawing on contemporary letters and diaries, Flexner adds new material to earlier lives of Wollstonecraft, especially concerning Wollstonecraft's literary friendships and her relations with her sisters and brothers.

== Notes ==
Thomas Neville Bonner's Iconoclast and Ellen Fitzpatrick's foreword to the 1996 edition of Century of Struggle were the major sources of information about the Flexner family.

Information about Flexner's work history and the development of her ideas comes variously from Kate Weigand's Red Feminism, from the Schlesinger Library Archives, Harvard University, and from Ellen Fitspatrick's foreword to Century of Struggle.
