= Abraham Flexner =

American educator (1866–1959)

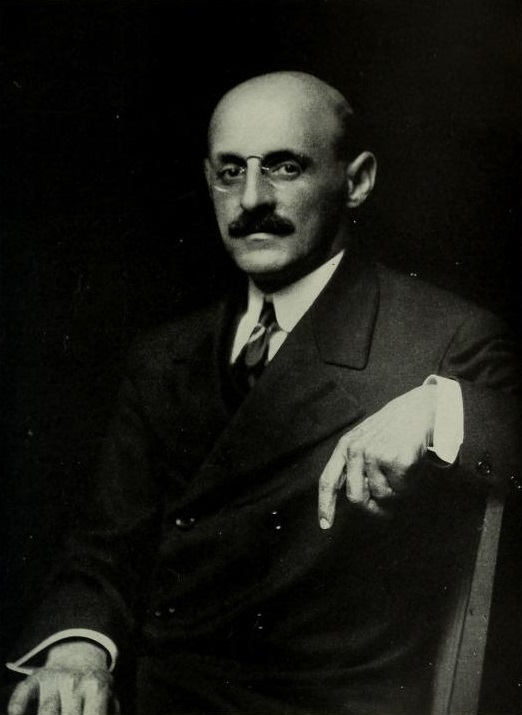
- Flexner, c. 1910
- Born: November 13, 1866; Louisville, Kentucky, U.S.
- Died: September 21, 1959 (aged 92); Falls Church, Virginia, U.S.
- Resting place: Cave Hill Cemetery; Louisville, Kentucky, U.S.
- Education: Johns Hopkins University (BA); Harvard University; University of Berlin
- Known for: Flexner Report
- Spouse: Anne Laziere Crawford (m. 1896)
- Children: Eleanor Flexner (daughter)
- Relatives: Louis B. Flexner (nephew)
- Scientific career
- Fields: Higher education Medical education
- Workplaces: Johns Hopkins University; Rockefeller Institute; University of Berlin; Harvard University; Institute for Advanced Study

Abraham Flexner (November 13, 1866 – September 21, 1959), an American educator, became best known for his role in the 20th-century reform of medical and higher education in the United States and Canada.

After founding and directing a college-preparatory school in his hometown of Louisville, Kentucky, Flexner published a critical assessment of the state of the American educational system in 1908 titled The American College: A Criticism. His work attracted the Carnegie Foundation to commission from him an in-depth evaluation into 155 medical schools in the US and Canada. His resulting Flexner Report, published in 1910, sparked the reform of medical education in the United States and Canada.

In 1930 Flexner founded the Institute for Advanced Study in Princeton, which brought together some of the greatest minds in history to collaborate on intellectual discovery and research.

== Biography ==
=== Early life and education ===
Flexner was born in Louisville, Kentucky on November 13, 1866. He was the sixth of nine children born to German Jewish immigrants Ester and Moritz Flexner. He was the first in his family to complete high school and go on to college. In 1886, at age 19, Flexner completed a B.A. in classics at Johns Hopkins University, where he studied for only two years. In 1905, he pursued graduate studies in psychology at Harvard University, and at the University of Berlin. He did not, however, complete work on an advanced degree at either institution.

=== Personal life ===
Flexner had three brothers named Jacob, Bernard and Simon Flexner. He also had a sister named Rachel Flexner.

The success of Abraham Flexner's experimental schooling allowed him to help finance Simon Flexner's medical education at Johns Hopkins School of Medicine. He proceeded to become a pathologist, bacteriologist and a medical researcher employed by the Rockefeller Institute for Medical Research from 1901 to 1935.

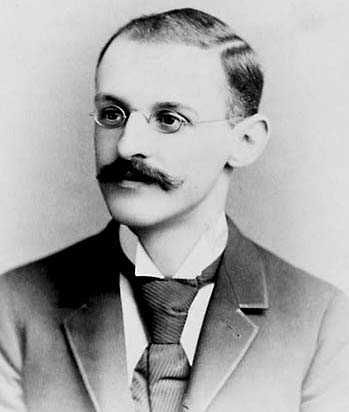
Flexner c. 1895

Flexner also financed his sister's undergraduate studies at Bryn Mawr College. Jacob ran a drugstore and used the profits from selling the establishment to attend medical school. He then practiced as a physician in Louisville. Bernard pursued a career in law and later practiced in both Chicago and New York.

In 1896, Flexner married a former student of his school, Anne Laziere Crawford. She was a teacher who soon became a successful playwright and children's author. The success of her play Mrs. Wiggs of the Cabbage Patch (based on the 1901 novel) funded Flexner's studies at Harvard and his year abroad at European universities. The couple supported women's suffrage and had two daughters Jean and Eleanor. Jean went on to become one of the original employees of the United States Division of Labor Standards. Eleanor Flexner became an independent scholar and pioneer of women's studies.

Flexner grew up in an Orthodox Jewish family; however, early on he became a religious agnostic.

In addition to contributions by his brother Simon, their nephew, Louis Barkhouse Flexner, was founding director of the Mahoney Institute of Neurological Sciences at the University of Pennsylvania and a former editor of the Proceedings of the National Academy of Sciences.

=== Death ===
Flexner died in Falls Church, Virginia, in 1959 at 92 years of age. He was buried in Cave Hill Cemetery in Louisville, Kentucky.

== Career ==
=== Experimental schooling ===
After graduating from Johns Hopkins University in two years with a degree in classics, Flexner returned to Louisville to teach classics at Louisville Male High School. Four years later, Flexner founded a private school in which he would test his growing ideas about education. Flexner opposed the standard model of education that focused on mental discipline and a rigid structure. Moreover, "Mr. Flexner's School" did not give out traditional grades, used no standard curriculum, refused to impose examinations on students, and kept no academic record of students. Instead, it promoted small learning groups, individual development, and a more hands-on approach to education. Graduates of his school were soon accepted at leading colleges, and his teaching style began to attract considerable attention.

=== The American College ===
In 1908, Flexner published his first book, The American College. Strongly critical of many aspects of American higher education, it denounced, in particular, the university lecture as a method of instruction. According to Flexner, lectures enabled colleges to "handle cheaply by wholesale a large body of students that would be otherwise unmanageable and thus give the lecturer time for research." In addition, Flexner was concerned about the chaotic condition of the undergraduate curriculum and the influence of the research culture of the university. Neither contributed to the mission of the college to address the whole person. He feared that "research had largely appropriated the resources of the college, substituting the methods and interest of highly specialized investigation for the larger objects of college teaching."

His book attracted the attention of Henry Pritchett, president of the Carnegie Foundation, who was looking for someone to lead a series of studies of professional education. The book consistently cited Pritchett in discussions of views on educational reform, and the two soon arranged to meet through the then-president of Johns Hopkins University, Ira Remsen. Although Flexner had never set foot inside a medical school, he was Pritchett's first choice to lead a study of American medical education, and soon joined the research staff at the Carnegie Foundation in 1908. Although not a physician himself, Flexner was selected by Pritchett for his writing ability and his disdain for traditional education.

=== Flexner Report ===
In 1910, Flexner published the Flexner Report, which examined the state of American medical education and led to far-reaching reform in the training of doctors. The Flexner Report led to the closure of most rural medical schools and five out of seven African-American medical colleges in the United States given his adherence to germ theory, in which he argued that if not properly trained and treated, African-Americans and the poor posed a health threat to middle/upper class European-Americans. His position was:

The practice of the Negro doctor will be limited to his own race, which in its turn will be cared for better by good Negro physicians than by poor white ones. But the physical well-being of the Negro is not only of moment to the Negro himself. Ten million of them live in close contact with sixty million whites. Not only does the Negro himself suffer from hookworm and tuberculosis; he communicates them to his white neighbors, precisely as the ignorant and unfortunate white contaminates him. Self-protection not less than humanity offers weighty counsel in this matter; self-interest seconds philanthropy. The Negro must be educated not only for his sake, but for ours. He is, as far as the human eye can see, a permanent factor in the nation.

Ironically, one of the schools, Louisville National Medical College, was located in Flexner's hometown. In response to the report, some schools fired senior faculty members in a process of reform and renewal.

=== Influence on Europe ===
Flexner soon conducted a related study of medical education in Europe. According to Bonner (2002), Flexner's work came to be "nearly as well known in Europe as in America." With funding from the Rockefeller Foundation, Flexner "...exerted a decisive influence on the course of medical training and left an enduring mark on some of the nation's most renowned schools of medicine." Bonner worried that "the imposition of rigid standards by accrediting groups was making the medical curriculum a monstrosity," with medical students moving through it with "little time to stop, read, work or think." Bonner (2002) calls Flexner "the severest critic and the best friend American medicine ever had."

=== New Lincoln School ===
Between 1912 and 1925, Flexner served on the Rockefeller Foundation's General Education Board, and after 1917 was its secretary. With the help of the board, he founded another experimental school, the Lincoln School, which opened in 1917, in cooperation with the faculty at Teachers College of Columbia University.

=== Institute for Advanced Study ===
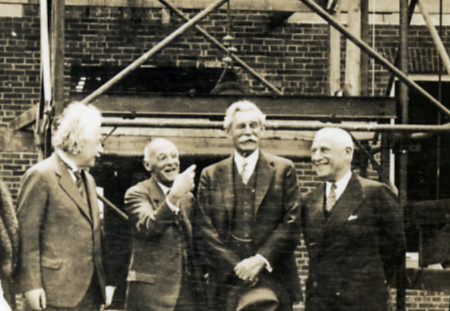
Left to right: Albert Einstein, Abraham Flexner, John R. Hardin, and Herbert Maass at the Institute for Advanced Study on May 22, 1939

Louis Bamberger and his sister Caroline Bamberger Fuld, founders of Bamberger's department store, which they had sold to Macy's following the death of co-founder and husband Felix Fuld, were set on creating a medical school in Newark, New Jersey. They wanted to give admissions preference to Jewish applicants in an effort to fight the rampant prejudice against Jews in the medical profession at that time. Flexner informed them that a teaching hospital and other faculties required a successful school. A few months later, in June 1930, he had persuaded the Bamberger siblings and their representatives to fund instead the development of an Institute for Advanced Study.

The institute was headed by Flexner from 1930 to 1939 and it possessed a renowned faculty including Kurt Gödel and John von Neumann.

During his time there, Flexner helped bring over many European scientists who would likely have suffered persecution by the rising Nazi government. This included Albert Einstein, who arrived at the Institute in 1933 under Flexner's directorship.

=== Universities: American, English, German ===
In his 1930 Universities: American, English, German, Flexner returned to his earlier interest in the direction and purpose of the American university, attacking distractions from serious learning, such as intercollegiate athletics, student government, and other student activities.

== Legacy ==
- The Flexner Report and his work in education has had a lasting impact on medical and higher education. The specific impacts of the Flexner Report on American and Canadian medicine include:
  - Average physician quality has increased significantly
  - Medicine has become a lucrative and well-respected profession
  - A physician must receive at minimum six years, preferably eight years of post-secondary education, typically in a university setting
  - Medical education is based on research, specifically in the fields of human physiology and biochemistry
  - Medical research follows the same protocols as scientific research
  - The state government must approve the founding of any medical school and medical schools are subject to state regulation
  - The state branches of the American Medical Association oversee all the conventional medical schools in each state
- The Institute for Advanced Study, which Flexner co-founded, has been conducting valuable research for over 80 years in attempt to understand the complexities of the physical world and humanity

== Honors ==
- The Association of American Medical Colleges created the Abraham Flexner Award for Distinguished Service to Medical Education to annually recognize individuals who have made a notable contribution to American medical education. In 2020, "in light of racist and sexist writings" the AAMC renamed the award, removing Flexner's name.
- The University of Kentucky College of Medicine has the Academy of Medical Educator Excellence in Medical Education Award, which was formerly named the Abraham Flexner Master Educator Award, to recognize achievement in six categories:
  - Educational Leadership and Administration
  - Outstanding Teaching Contribution or Mentorship
  - Educational Innovation and Curriculum Development
  - Educational Evaluation and Research
  - Faculty Development in Education
- Abraham Flexner Way in downtown Louisville's hospital district was named by the Louisville Board of Aldermen in November 1978 to honor Flexner.

== Bibliography ==
- The American College: A Criticism. 1908. Archived from the original on November 9, 2019 – via Questia.
- 1910. Medical Education in the United States and Canada.
- 1910. Medical Education in the United States and Canada (at Google Books).
- 1912. Medical education in Europe; a report to the Carnegie foundation for the advancement of teaching.
- 1915. "Is Social Work a Profession?" Proceedings of the National Conference of Charities and Correction at the Forty-second annual session held in Baltimore, Maryland, May 12–19, 1915.
- 1916. A Modern School.
- 1916 (with Frank P. Bachman). Public Education in Maryland: A Report to the Maryland Educational Survey Commission.
- 1918 (with F.B. Bachman). The Gary Schools.
- 1927 "Do Americans Really Value Education?" The Inglis Lecture 1927(Harvard University Press)
- 1928. The Burden of Humanism. The Taylorian Lecture at Oxford University.
- 1930. Universities: American, English, German.
- 1939. Flexner Abraham (1939 June/November). The Usefulness of Useless Knowledge. Harpers, Issue 179, pp. 544–552. .
- 1940. I Remember: The Autobiography of Abraham Flexner. Simon and Schuster. Fulltext
- 1943. A biography of H.S. Pritchett.

== See also ==
- Charles Flexner (born 1956), American physician, clinical pharmaceutical scientist, academic, author and researcher
- James Thomas Flexner (1908–2003), American historian and biographer
- Simon Flexner (1863–1946), physician, scientist, administrator, and professor
