= Simon Flexner =

American physician and scientist (1863–1946)

Simon Flexner ForMemRS
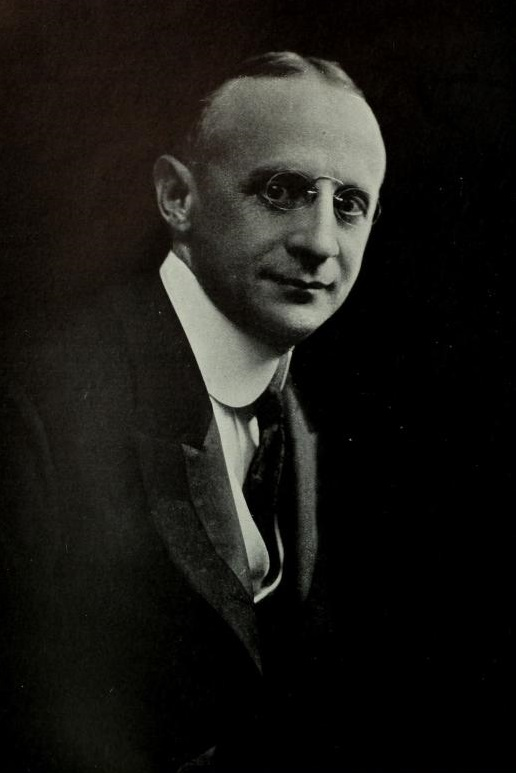

1st Director of Rockefeller Institute
- In office 1901–1935
- Succeeded by: Herbert Spencer Gasser

Personal details
- Born: March 25, 1863 Louisville, Kentucky, US
- Died: May 2, 1946 (aged 83) New York City, US
- Education: University of Louisville
- Awards: Cameron Prize of the University of Edinburgh (1911)
- Scientific career
- Fields: Physician, medical educator, and experimental pathologist
- Workplaces: Johns Hopkins University; Rockefeller Institute; Balliol College, Oxford
- Doctoral students: John D. Rockefeller Jr.

Simon Flexner (March 25, 1863 – May 2, 1946) was an American physician, scientist, administrator, and professor of experimental pathology at the University of Pennsylvania (1899–1903). He served as the first director of the Rockefeller Institute for Medical Research (1901–1935) (later developed as Rockefeller University) and a trustee of the Rockefeller Foundation. He was also a friend and adviser to John D. Rockefeller Jr.

Among Flexner's most important achievements are studies into poliomyelitis and the development of serum treatment for meningitis. Among his lab assistants were Hideyo Noguchi and Cornelius Rhoads, later directors of Memorial Hospital and the Sloan-Kettering Institute, respectively.

The bacteria species Shigella flexneri was named in recognition of Flexner. In addition, Flexner was the first to describe Flexner-Wintersteiner rosettes, a characteristic finding in retinoblastoma, a type of cancer.

== Early life and career ==
Simon was born in Louisville, Kentucky, to Moritz (Morris) Flexner, a Jewish immigrant from Neumark, Bohemia, via several years in Strasbourg, France; and Ester from Roden, Germany. He was the fourth son of seven in a large family of nine children: Jacob, Henry, and Isadore; then Simon, followed by Bernard Flexner, Abraham Flexner, and Washington. The two sisters Mary and Gertrude were the youngest. Jacob became a pharmacist and physician, Bernard became a Zionist leader, and Abraham became an educator, eventually influencing the direction of medical education in the United States.

Flexner was reportedly inattentive in school, often getting into trouble and playing pranks on his peers. He narrowly survived typhoid fever but was nursed back to health by his mother, who communicated and slept in the same bed as him. In his older years, he was fired multiple times and first worked in his family's graphic studio, later becoming an indentured assistant to a local pharmacist.

Simon first gained a degree from the Louisville College of Pharmacy and worked with his brother Jacob for eight years.

== Medical school and career ==
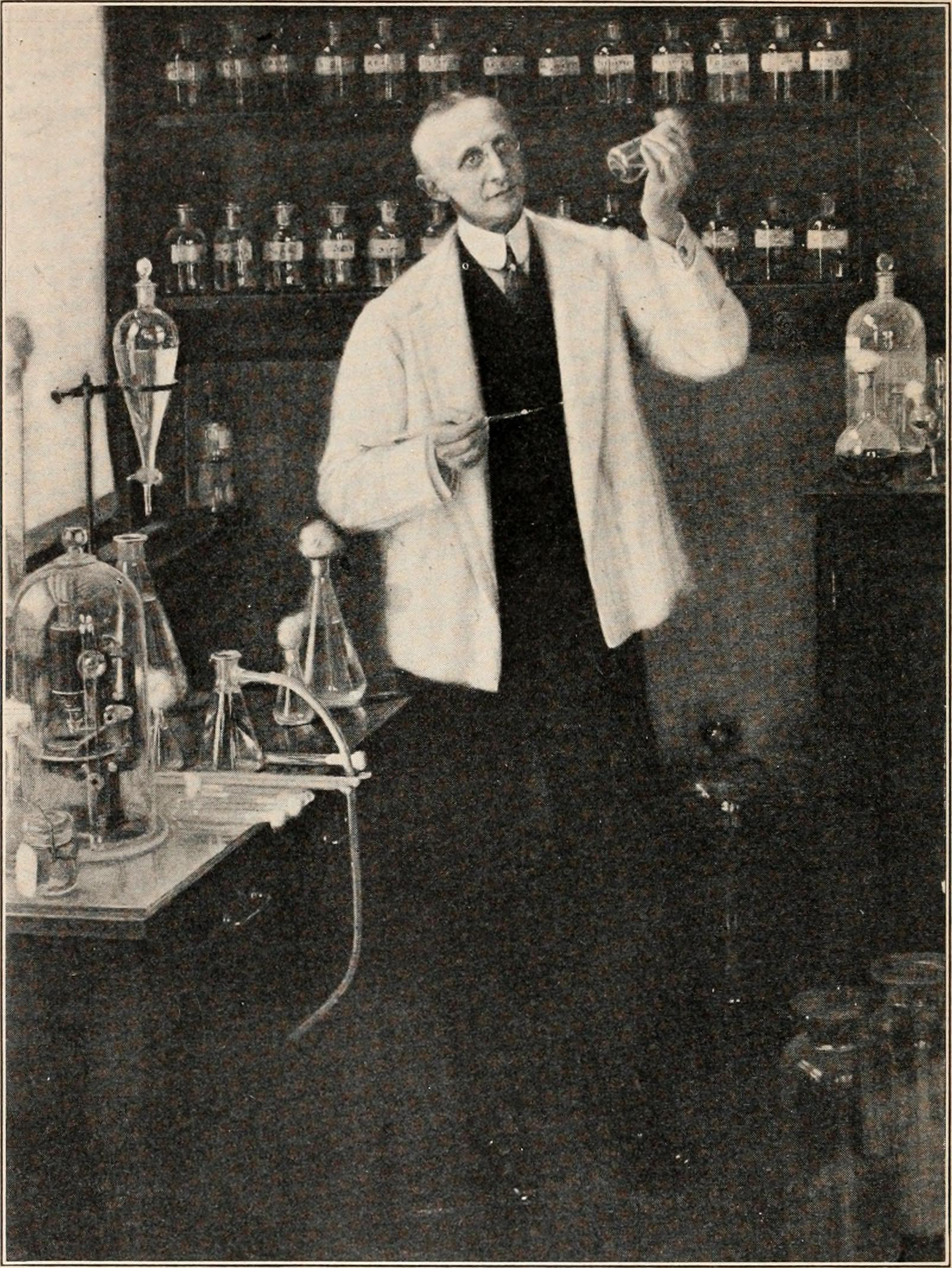
Illustration of Flexner on a 1912 cover of Popular Science Monthly

He returned to college, getting his medical degree from Louisville Medical College in 1889. He did postgraduate work in pathology at Johns Hopkins University Medical School, and started teaching there. By 1899, he was a professor of pathology at the University of Pennsylvania.

Flexner was elected to the American Philosophical Society in 1901.

He taught at Penn until 1903, but was called to the Rockefeller Institute for Medical Research (later Rockefeller University), where he started serving as its first director in 1901. He managed the research institute until 1935. Through this affiliation and related work, he came to know the philanthropist John D. Rockefeller, who supported research and basic medical care.

In December 1907 Flexner declared in a reading of his paper on "Tendencies in Pathology" in the University of Chicago that it would be possible in the then-future for diseased human organs substitution for healthy ones by surgery—including arteries, stomach, kidneys and heart. These previsions became reality in the second half of the 20th century.

In 1911, Flexner was awarded the Cameron Prize for Therapeutics of the University of Edinburgh.

From 1910 to 1914 he was a trustee of the Carnegie Institution.

== Marriage and family ==
Simon Flexner married Helen Thomas (later professor of English) and had a family. His son James Thomas Flexner became a prolific writer; one of his works was an extensive biography of George Washington.

Simon Flexner died in May 1946 in New York City, from a myocardial infarction (heart attack). He was 83 years old. His papers are currently housed at the American Philosophical Society and the Becker Medical Library at the Washington University School of Medicine.

== See also ==
- Abraham Flexner (1866–1959), American educator
- Charles Flexner (born 1956), American physician, clinical pharmaceutical scientist, academic, author and researcher
- James Thomas Flexner (1908–2003), American historian and biographer
