= SS Louis Bamberger =

Liberty ship of WWII

History

United States
- Name: Louis Bamberger
- Namesake: Louis Bamberger
- Owner: War Shipping Administration (WSA)
- Operator: Weyerhaeuser Steamship Company
- Ordered: as type (EC2-S-C1) hull, MC hull 2508
- Awarded: 23 April 1943
- Builder: St. Johns River Shipbuilding Company, Jacksonville, Florida
- Cost: $961,486
- Yard number: 72
- Way number: 6
- Laid down: 28 October 1944
- Launched: 29 November 1944
- Sponsored by: Mrs. George H. Barber
- Completed: 8 December 1944
- Identification: Call sign: ANBS
- Fate: Sold for commercial use, 31 October 1947

United States
- Name: Horace Irvine
- Owner: Weyerhaeuser Steamship Company
- Fate: Sold, 1968

Panama
- Name: Reliance Amity
- Owner: Reliance Carriers, SA
- Operator: Hongkong Maritime Co.
- Fate: Scrapped, 1971

General characteristics
- Class & type: Liberty ship; type EC2-S-C1, standard
- Tonnage: 10,865 LT DWT; 7,176 GRT
- Displacement: 3,380 long tons (3,434 t) (light); 14,245 long tons (14,474 t) (max)
- Length: 441 feet 6 inches (135 m) oa; 416 feet (127 m) pp; 427 feet (130 m) lwl
- Beam: 57 feet (17 m)
- Draft: 27 ft 9.25 in (8.4646 m)
- Installed power: 2 × Oil fired 450 °F (232 °C) boilers, operating at 220 psi (1,500 kPa); 2,500 hp (1,900 kW)
- Propulsion: 1 × triple-expansion steam engine, (manufactured by General Machinery Corp., Hamilton, Ohio); 1 × screw propeller
- Speed: 11.5 knots (21.3 km/h; 13.2 mph)
- Capacity: 562,608 cubic feet (15,931 m^{3}) (grain); 499,573 cubic feet (14,146 m^{3}) (bale)
- Complement: 38–62 USMM; 21–40 USNAG
- Armament: Varied by ship; Bow-mounted 3-inch (76 mm)/50-caliber gun; Stern-mounted 4-inch (102 mm)/50-caliber gun; 2–8 × single 20-millimeter (0.79 in) Oerlikon anti-aircraft (AA) cannons and/or, 2–8 × 37-millimeter (1.46 in) M1 AA guns

SS Louis Bamberger was a Liberty ship built in the United States during World War II. She was named after Louis Bamberger, a businessman and philanthropist, noted for co-founding, with his sister Caroline Bamberger Fuld, the Institute for Advanced Study in Princeton, New Jersey.

== Construction ==
Louis Bamberger was laid down on 28 October 1944, under a Maritime Commission (MARCOM) contract, MC hull 2508, by the St. Johns River Shipbuilding Company, Jacksonville, Florida; she was sponsored by Mrs. George H. Barber, the wife of a War Shipping Administration (WSA) official, and was launched on 29 November 1944.

== History ==
She was allocated to the Weyerhaeuser Steamship Company, on 31 October 1944. She was sold for commercial use, 31 October 1947, to the Weyerhaeuser Steamship Company, she was renamed the SS Horace Irvine, to transport Weyerhaeuser lumber goods.

== Bibliography ==
- "St. John's River Shipbuilding, Jacksonville FL". www.ShipbuildingHistory.com. 16 October 2010.
- Maritime Administration. "Louis Bamberger". Ship History Database Vessel Status Card. U.S. Department of Transportation, Maritime Administration.
- Davies, James (May 2004). "Specifications (As-Built)" (PDF). p. 23.
- "SS Louis Bamberger".
