= I.Q. (film) =

1994 film by Fred Schepisi

- Theatrical release poster
- Directed by: Fred Schepisi
- Screenplay by: Andy Breckman; Michael J. Leeson
- Story by: Andy Breckman
- Produced by: Fred Schepisi; Carol Baum; Neil A. Machlis (co-producer)
- Starring: Tim Robbins; Meg Ryan; Walter Matthau; Charles Durning
- Cinematography: Ian Baker
- Edited by: Jill Bilcock
- Music by: Jerry Goldsmith
- Distributed by: Paramount Pictures
- Release date: December 25, 1994
- Running time: 96 minutes
- Country: United States
- Languages: English; German
- Budget: $25 million
- Box office: $47 million

I.Q. is a 1994 American romantic comedy film directed by Fred Schepisi and starring Tim Robbins, Meg Ryan and Walter Matthau. The original music score is composed by Jerry Goldsmith.

The film, set in the mid-1950s, centers on a mechanic and a Princeton University doctoral candidate who fall in love thanks to the candidate's uncle, Albert Einstein.

The film was a moderate box office success and received mixed reviews.

== Plot ==
At 1950s Princeton University, mathematics doctoral candidate Catherine Boyd is engaged to hyper-critical James Moreland, a professor of experimental psychology. They stop at a nearby garage when their car breaks down, where mechanic Ed Walters, a science-fiction hobbyist, falls in love with Catherine at first sight.

Ed visits Catherine's address to return her forgotten watch, coming face to face with Albert Einstein, Catherine's uncle. Befriending Albert and his mischievous fellow scientists Nathan Liebknecht, Kurt Gödel, and Boris Podolsky, Ed confides in them about his feelings for Catherine. At a Princeton faculty dinner, she embarrasses James by suggesting a sensual Hawaiian honeymoon, and he reveals that he has accepted a position at Stanford University, where she likely will be relegated to life as a housewife.

The four scientists bring Albert's car to Ed's garage to transform into a convertible and, believing Ed is far better suited for Catherine than James, brainstorm how he can pique her interest. He jokingly asks to "borrow their brains", inspiring them to help him pose as a hidden genius. They convince Catherine that Ed has developed a brilliant concept for a cold fusion-powered spacecraft, secretly based on one of Albert's unpublished papers.

Catherine arranges for a nervous Ed to present his supposed findings at an Institute for Advanced Study symposium, where he makes it through by speaking directly to her. At the reception afterward, the scientists distract James and Albert feigns a heart attack to leave with Catherine and Ed, bringing them to a café. She senses Ed's feelings for her, but Albert arranges for them to share a dance to a jukebox waltz, until Catherine remembers James is expecting her.

Bob and Frank, Ed's fellow mechanics, worry he is in too deep, and James challenges him in front of the press to a public intelligence test. With Catherine in the audience, an inspired Ed quickly solves the manual puzzles, but is subjected to fifty multiple-choice questions on advanced physics. The four scientists slyly prompt him with the answers, leading him to score an I.Q. of 186.

The "proof" of Ed's genius is publicized in newspapers and cinema newsreels, much to Catherine's delight, but she notices an error in his supposed calculations in the cold-fusion paper, forcing Albert to cause her to doubt her own work to protect the ruse. The scientists free James' lab animals to keep him from Albert's sailing excursion, where Catherine realizes her own feelings for Ed, and they kiss.

Ed prepares to tell Catherine the truth, but is surprised by the arrival of President Eisenhower, who expects to see the supposed nuclear fusion engine that will overtake a rumored Russian project. Realizing the truth about Ed, Catherine is picked up by the presidential motorcade. Ed catches up on his motorcycle and she confronts him in a field, leading the president to believe Ed is proposing to her. Catherine slaps Ed after he admits to lying to her, and Albert confirms that she has mathematically disproven his own theory.

Having unearthed Albert's original paper, James accuses both Ed and Albert of fraud, but Albert claims that everything was part of "Operation Red Cabbage", a top-secret scheme to prove the Russians were lying about their own nuclear advances. Rushed to the hospital for a real emergency, Albert urges Catherine not to let her brain overrule her heart. Ed apologizes to Catherine and departs, hoping she will someday realize she is extraordinary. A comet is due that night, and the scientists arrange for Catherine to find Ed at Stargazers' Field, where they reunite to watch the stars from Albert's convertible.

== Cast ==
- Tim Robbins as Ed Walters
- Meg Ryan as Catherine Boyd
- Walter Matthau as Albert Einstein
- Lou Jacobi as Kurt Gödel
- Gene Saks as Boris Podolsky
- Joseph Maher as Nathan Liebknecht
- Stephen Fry as James Moreland
- Daniel von Bargen as Secret Service Agent
- Tony Shalhoub as Bob Rosetti
- Frank Whaley as Frank
- Charles Durning as Louis Bamberger
- Keene Curtis as Dwight D. Eisenhower
- Alice Playten as Gretchen
- Greg Germann as Bill Riley, Times reporter

== Dramatic alterations ==
For dramatic reasons, I.Q. fictionalizes the lives of certain real people. Albert Einstein did not have a niece by the name of Catherine Boyd. Kurt Gödel was famously shy and reclusive, unlike his fictional counterpart in this film. The movie gives the impression that Einstein and his friends are all around the same age, when in fact, they were between 17 and 30 years younger than Einstein. The real Louis Bamberger died in 1944, before the film's set period.

The characters in the film listen to Little Richard's "Tutti-Frutti", which was released in November 1955, although Albert Einstein died the previous April.

== Production ==
Director Fred Schepisi later said that although he liked the film, it was not what it could have been:

The problem was there were two other producers, there was a studio and there was Tim Robbins and they were all contributing, and Tim Robbins was being difficult because he said in the '90s nobody would like a character who has a woman fall in love with him because of a lie. That's the whole premise of the film. And it's all right for him to know that and believe it, but he should spend the whole time trying to say, "Hey, I'm lying to you," and be constantly frustrated. Because of that attitude, he pulled the film this way, he pulled it that way while we were writing and it just felt messy. And nobody ever understood the value of those four scientists, and I like the cast that I had, but the other three scientists apart from Walter Matthau were originally going to be Peter Ustinov, Barry Humphries and John Cleese. I wanted them all the way through, but nobody understood how strong they would be. Nobody understood that with a garage and the scientists and this other guy, if you could just stay within that world, if you kept your two lovers together all the time under pressure and you do lots of silly things—there were a couple of wonderfully silly things when they were trying to prove his theory and they kept blowing things up—it had that whimsy about it that would have kept the lovers together and under tension. If they want subplots, they up the stakes and all this formulaic crap - and that's the problem.

== Reception ==
I.Q. opened in theaters on Christmas Day. It grossed $3,131,201 during its opening weekend, ranking eighth at the US box office. By the time that the film closed, it had grossed $26,381,221 in the United States and Canada. It grossed $47 million worldwide.

The film received mixed reviews from critics. On Rotten Tomatoes, I.Q. holds a 47% rating, based on 30 reviews.

Roger Ebert of the Chicago Sun-Times gave the film 3½ stars out of 4, with glowing praise of Walter Matthau's performance. "Matthau as Einstein is a stroke of casting genius. He looks uncannily like the great mathematician. Whether he acts like him I am not in a position to say, but he certainly doesn't act like himself: He has left all his Matthauisms behind, and created this performance from scratch, and it's one of the year's genuine comic gems. He deserves an Oscar nomination."

=== Year-end lists ===
- 9th – David Elliott, The San Diego Union-Tribune
- "The second 10" (not ranked) – Sean P. Means, The Salt Lake Tribune

== See also ==
- List of films about mathematicians
