= Hutzler =

Hutzler is a surname. Notable people with the surname include:

- Brody Hutzler (born 1971), American actor
- Moses Hutzler (1800–1889), German-born American businessman
- Stefan Hutzler (1965-Present), German-born Irish Physicist specialising in foams

== See also ==
- Hetzler
- Hutzler's, a defunct American department store
