= Hetzler =

Hetzler is a surname. Notable people with the surname include:

- Mark Hetzler (born 1968), American trombonist
- Theodore Hetzler (1875–1945), American banker

== See also ==
- Hutzler
