= Caroline Bamberger Fuld =

American businesswoman and philanthropist (1864–1944)

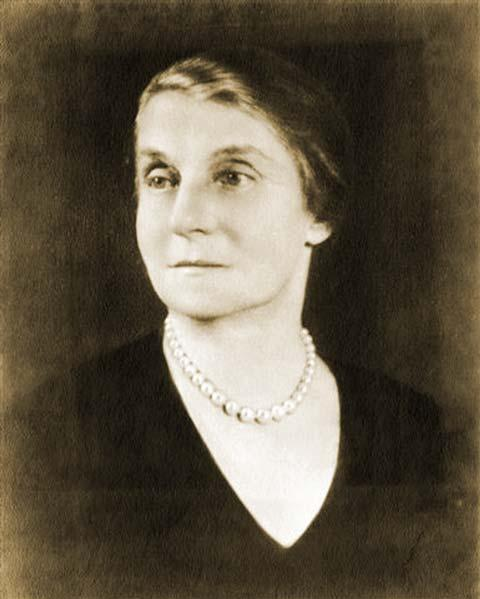
- Fuld in c. 1920.
- Born: Caroline Bamberger; March 16, 1864; Baltimore, Maryland
- Died: July 18, 1944 (aged 80)
- Spouses: Louis Frank (m. 1883–1910) Felix Fuld (m. 1913–1929)
- Family: Moses Hutzler (grandfather); Louis Bamberger (brother)

Caroline Bamberger Frank Fuld (nickname, "Carrie"; March 16, 1864 – July 18, 1944) was an American businesswoman and philanthropist. She and her brother Louis Bamberger co-founded L. Bamberger & Co. department store in Newark, and later the Institute for Advanced Study in Princeton, New Jersey.

== Biography ==
Caroline ("Carrie") Bamberger grew up in Baltimore, the fifth of six children born to Elkan Bamberger, who had emigrated from Bavaria in 1840, and Theresa (née Hutzler) Bamberger, whose brothers had founded and operated a large Baltimore department store, Hutzler's. Her siblings were Clara "Lavinia" Bamberger; Rosa Bamberger; Louis Bamberger; Julius Bamberger; Pauline Bamberger; and Julia Bamberger. Caroline Bamberger and brother Louis relocated to Philadelphia in 1883 – where they would meet Louis Meyer Frank, whom she eventually would marry.

Louis Bamberger relocated to New York in 1887 as a buyer for a San Francisco–based notions store, living there until 1892 when he, Carolyn and her by-then husband, Louis Frank, relocated to New Jersey. The three of them were joined by a friend the Bamberger's had met in Baltimore, Felix Fuld, and all four would reside in a single-family home in South Orange, New Jersey, for the remainder of their respective lives. In 1892, when running a business was considered a man's job, the three men as named partners, along with Carolyn who was or would be immediate family to all three, started the Newark, New Jersey–based department store that became L. Bamberger and Co. All four worked in the store and developed new methods of retail advertising and selling.

Carolyn's marriage to Louis Frank in 1883 lasted until he died in 1910. In 1913 she married her other business partner, Felix Fuld, surviving well beyond his death in 1929. Neither marriage produced children. Louis Bamberger and Carolyn Bamberger Frank Fuld sold L. Bamberger and Co. to R. H. Macy and Co. in June 1929 (for an amount estimated at $25–50 million, paid entirely in cash), a few months before the stock market crash. After the sale, they shared $1 million of the proceeds with 235 long-time employees.

Subsequently, Fuld devoted her energies to philanthropy. Previously with her husband, and continuing after his death, she contributed to Jewish charities, including Newark's Beth Israel Hospital, the Jewish Relief Committee, and Hadassah. In 1931, she was elected national director of the National Council of Jewish Women.

Most remembered, however, is the decision in 1929 by Fuld and her brother to seek the advice of Abraham Flexner, and subsequently to support, and endow financially, his vision for what became the Institute for Advanced Study in Princeton. Fuld and Bamberger contributed $5 million in 1930 for its initial endowment and approximately $18 million over time. Fuld was vice-president of the nascent Institute until 1933, and thereafter was a life trustee.

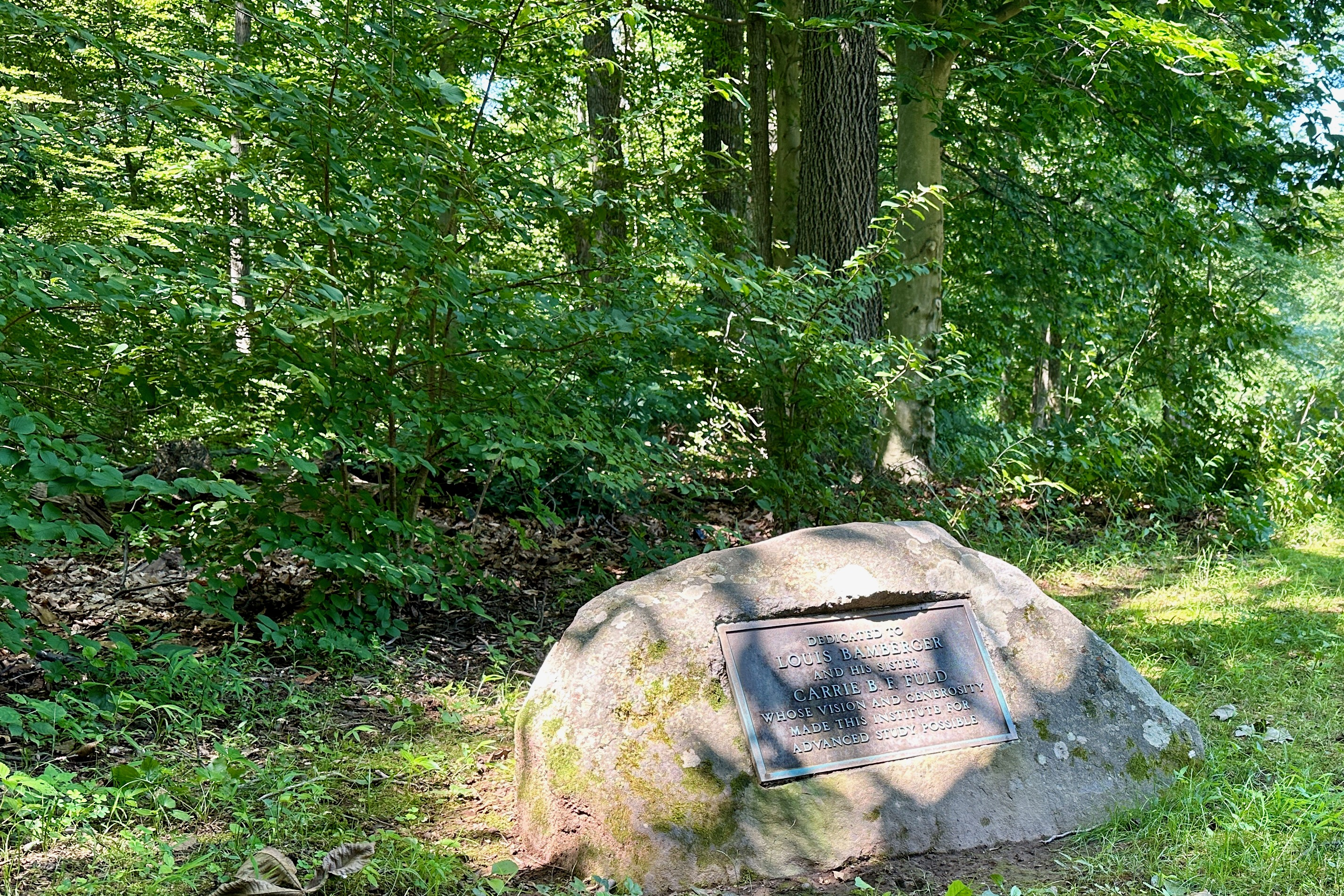
Founders' Rock at the Institute for Advanced Study, dedicated to her and her brother
