= North American Trade Schools =

Vocational school in Baltimore, Maryland

North American Trade Schools (NATS) is a private career school vocational school in Baltimore, Maryland. The school's campus is located in the unincorporated community of Woodlawn, Baltimore County, Maryland, adjacent to Security Square Mall. Its current enrollment consists of 529 full-time students.

== History ==
In 1970, the Diesel Institute of America (DIA) was founded by Sheldon Monsein, then president of Central GMC/Kenworth inc. in Landover, Maryland. His intent in starting the DIA was born from his company's need for additional qualified mechanics to service the diesel engine vehicles in the Central GMC/Kenworth fleet.

Not too long afterward, DIA offered its first class for diesel engine technicians in a 500-square-foot (46 m^{2}) garage in Landover, making the DIA the first trade school in the state of Maryland to offer training in the repair and maintenance of diesel engines. In September 1983, the Diesel Institute of America moved its operation to Grantsville, Maryland and, three years later, began offering training in driving commercial trucks.

In 2002, the DIA was purchased by EFC Trade, a Canada based business that specializes in providing career training through specialty schools. It was in 2004 that the Diesel Institute of America relocated from Grantsville to its current location in Baltimore and its name changed to North American Trade Schools. Matt Daly is the school director and has been with the company since it moved to Baltimore
