= List of Wolf Prize winners affiliated with the Institute for Advanced Study =

This is a comprehensive list of Wolf Prize winners affiliated with the Institute for Advanced Study in Princeton, New Jersey as current and former faculty members, visiting scholars, and other affiliates. These winners are all in mathematics and physics. No Institute scholar has as of 2015 ever won a Wolf Prize in Chemistry, Medicine, Arts, or Agriculture.

Wolf Prize in Mathematics
| Year | Prize winner | Country | Years affiliated with IAS |
|---|---|---|---|
| 1978 | Carl Ludwig Siegel | West Germany | 1935, 1940-1951, 1960 |
| 1979 | Jean Leray | France | 1950–1960 |
| 1979 | André Weil | France | 1937, 1958-1998 |
| 1980 | Henri Cartan | France | 1966-1967 |
| 1982 | Hassler Whitney | United States | 1952-1989 |
| 1983/4 | Shiing-Shen Chern | United States | 1943-1945, 1949, 1954-1955, 1964 |
| 1983/4 | Paul Erdős | Hungary | 1938-1940 |
| 1984/5 | Kunihiko Kodaira | Japan | 1949-1952, 1956-1961 |
| 1986 | Atle Selberg | Norway | 1947-2007 |
| 1987 | Kiyosi Itô | Japan | 1955-1956 |
| 1988 | Friedrich Hirzebruch | West Germany | 1952-1954, 1959-1960 |
| 1989 | Alberto Calderón | Argentina | 1953-1955 |
| 1989 | John Milnor | United States | 1966, 1970-1990, 1999, 2002 |
| 1992 | Lennart Carleson | Sweden | 1961-1962, 1988-1989 |
| 1994/5 | Jürgen Moser | Germany/United States | 1970-1971 |
| 1995/6 | Robert Langlands | Canada | 1962-1963, 1972-current |
| 1995/6 | Andrew Wiles | United Kingdom | 1981, 1992, 1995-2004, 2007 |
Wolf Prize in Physics
| Year | Prize winner | Country | Years affiliated with IAS |
| 1981 | Freeman Dyson | United Kingdom/United States | 1948-1950, 1953-current |
| 1993 | Benoit Mandelbrot | France/United States | 1953-1954 |
| 1994 | Yoichiro Nambu | Japan/United States | 1952-1954 |
