= Louis Bamberger =

American businessman and philanthropist (1855-1944)

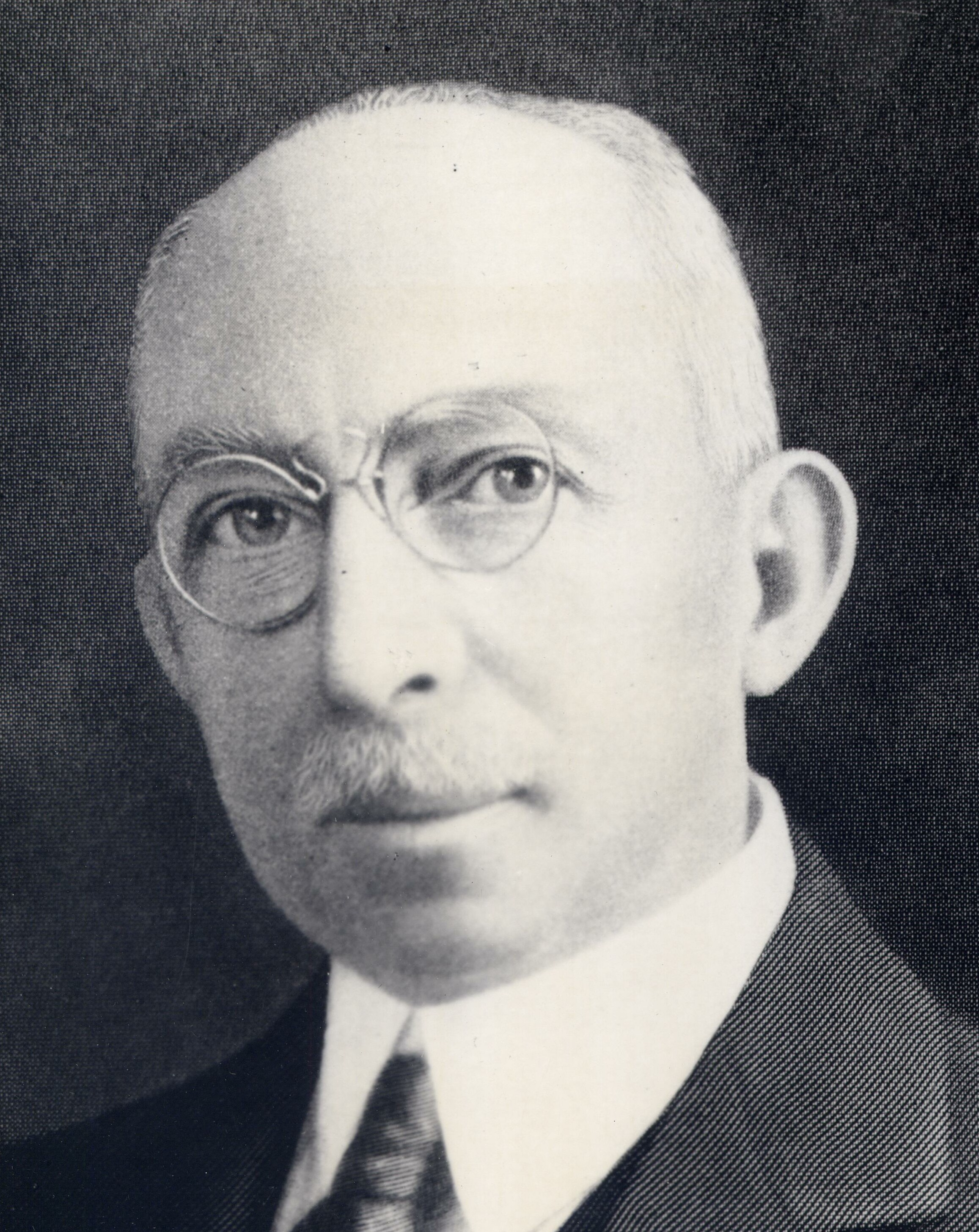
- Louis Bamberger, date unknown
- Born: May 15, 1855; Baltimore, Maryland
- Died: March 11, 1944 (aged 88); South Orange, New Jersey
- Family: Felix Fuld (brother-in-law); Caroline Bamberger Fuld (sister); Moses Hutzler (grandfather)

Louis Bamberger (May 15, 1855 – March 11, 1944) was an American businessman and philanthropist who co-founded the Bamberger's department store in Newark, New Jersey. He and his sister Caroline Bamberger Fuld co-founded the Institute for Advanced Study in Princeton, New Jersey.

== Early life and education ==
Louis Bamberger was born on May 15, 1855 in Baltimore, Maryland to Theresa (née Hutzler) and Elkan Bamberger. His father had immigrated to the United States in 1823 from a town near Nuremberg, and his mother belonged to the family that ran Hutzler Brothers in Baltimore. His grandfather was Moses Hutzler. He had six siblings: Caroline, Clara "Lavinia", Rosa, Julius, Pauline, and Julia.

He was educated in Baltimore public schools.

== Business career ==
Bamberger began his career working under his uncles at Hutzler Brothers. He left the business to work for his father at a new store. Upon his father's retirement, he and his brothers inherited the business, and Louis was made business manager. Bamberger moved to New York City to pursue business opportunities as a resident buyer for several large companies in the West and built a large and important list of clientele.

In 1892, he moved to Newark and, with his brothers-in-law Felix Fuld and Louis M. Frank, bought Hill & Craig, a bankrupt general goods store, renaming it L. Bamberger & Company and selecting a new site at the corner of Market Street and Halsey Street. The store was an immediate success.

In 1912, Bamberger opened an ornate chateauesque building that covered a whole city block at a cost of $2 million (equivalent to $65 million in 2024). For decades, the Bamberger’s clock was the downtown meeting place for Newarkers. In 1928, the store's sales were $28 million (equivalent to $513 million in 2024), making it the fourth-highest grossing store in the United States.

In 1929, Bamberger sold his department store to R.H. Macy and Company, which kept the original Bamberger name. Bamberger knew that he owed his success to hundreds of able employees, and split $1 million among 240 employees. The Bamberger name remained in use for the stores in the New Jersey division of Macy's until 1986.

== Charitable work ==
Bamberger supported both secular and Jewish charities. Bamberger personally funded the buildings for Newark’s YMHA, the Newark Museum, and the New Jersey Historical Society. He worked to help persecuted Jews escape from Germany's Third Reich. Bamberger was also a major contributor to the Community Chest and Beth Israel Hospital.

=== Institute for Advanced Study ===
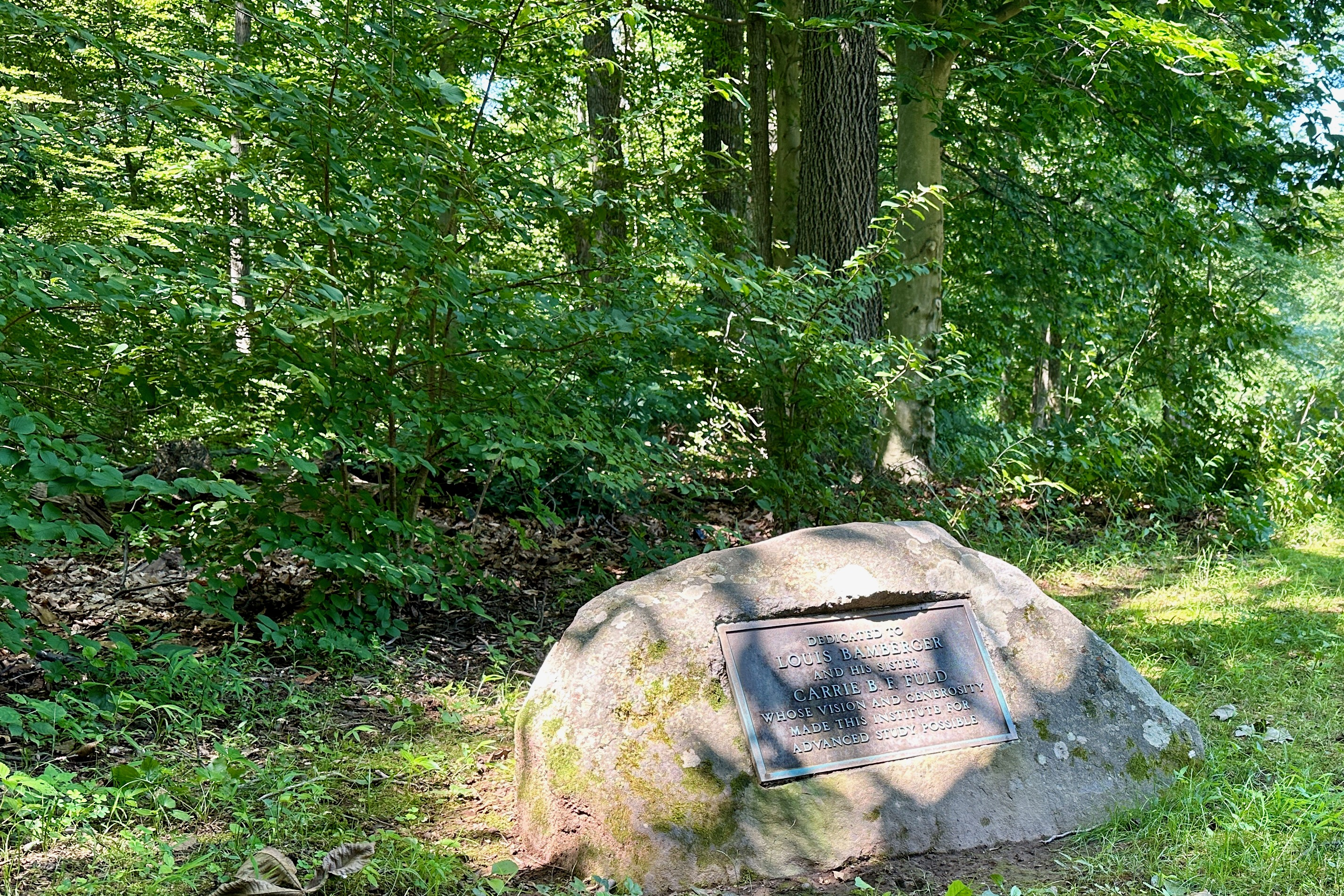
Founders' Rock at the Institute for Advanced Study, dedicated to Bamberger and his sister Caroline.

Bamberger and his sister Caroline Bamberger Fuld worked with Abraham Flexner to found the Institute for Advanced Study in Princeton, New Jersey. They gave a $5 million endowment to the Institute. Upon Bamberger's death the bulk of his estate was left to the Institute.

== Personal life and death ==
Bamberger was a shy man who never married and focused on running his store. His partner Felix Fuld was the more outgoing of the two, and his sister Caroline Bamberger Fuld was most involved in the charity activities of the family.

He died on March 11, 1944 at his home in South Orange. At his death, all flags in Newark were flown at half-staff for three days, City Hall was draped in black, and his large department store closed for a day.

== Legacy and honors ==
- The World War II Liberty Ship SS Louis Bamberger was named in his honor.
