= Felix Fuld =

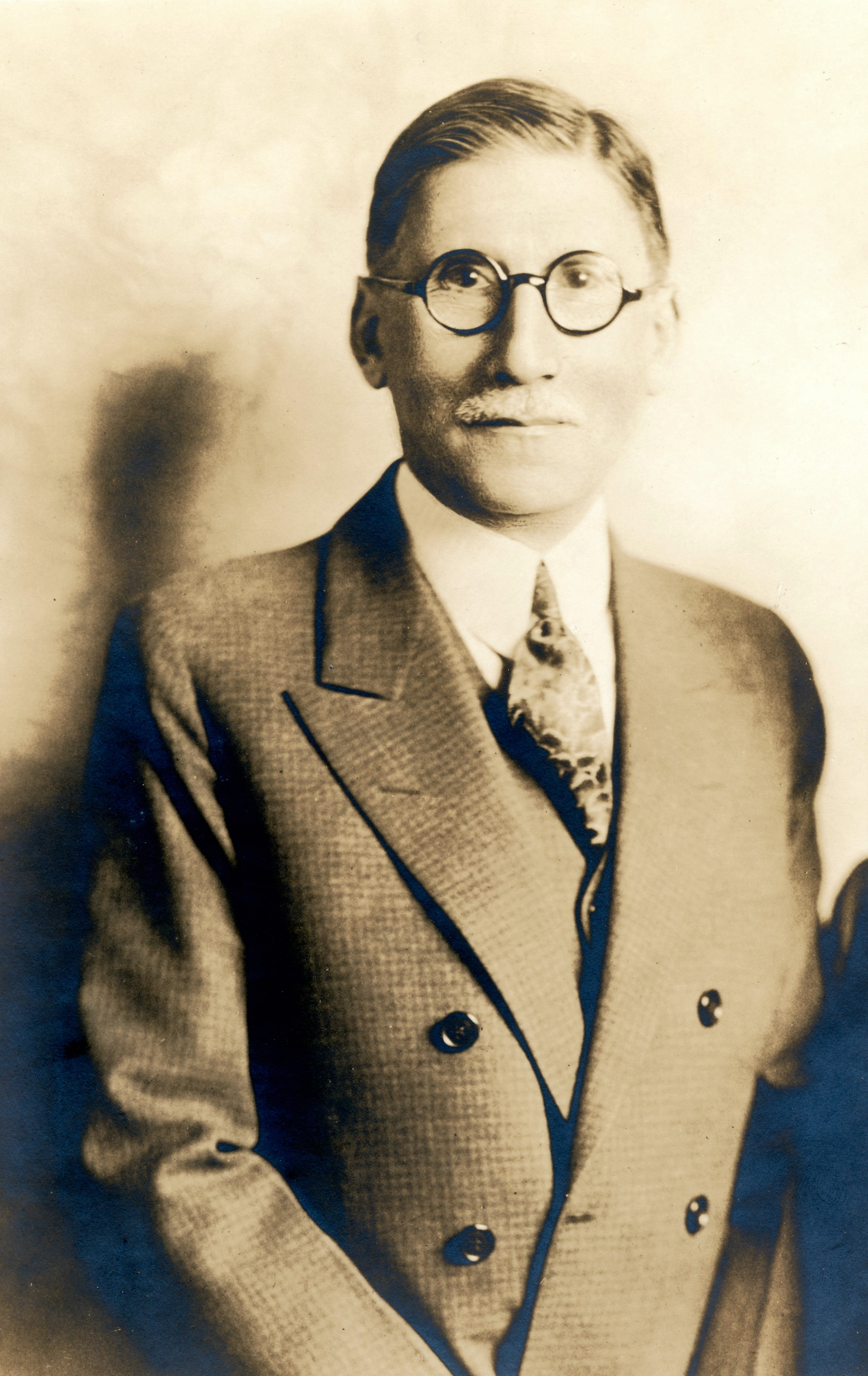
- Felix Fuld, date unknown
- Born: 19 July 1868; Frankfurt am Main, Germany
- Died: 20 January 1929 (aged 60)
- Spouse: Caroline Bamberger Fuld
- Family: Louis Bamberger (brother-in-law)

Felix Fuld (19 July 1868 – 20 January 1929) was an American businessman and philanthropist. He co-founded the Bamberger's department store in Newark, New Jersey with Louis Bamberger and Louis Frank. Felix Fuld married his business partner's sister, Caroline Bamberger Fuld who carried on his charitable work after his death at age 60, including the establishment of the Institute for Advanced Study.

== Early life ==
Felix Fuld was born to a Jewish family in Frankfurt am Main, Germany, the son of Ludwig and Theresa Fuld who came to New York in 1890, when Felix was 12. Fuld's father was a partner in the New York City banking house of Sternberger, Sinn & Fuld. Sternberger, Sinn & Fuld later became Gruntal & Co. Through his father, Fuld found a job at the Chesapeake Rubber Company in Baltimore where he met Louis Bamberger.

== L. Bamberger & Company ==
Felix Fuld joined Louis Bamberger and Bamberger's brother in-law, Louis M. Frank, to launch L. Bamberger & Company in 1893, a store with the tag line: One of America's Great Stores. A number of the store's policies were new to retailing such as merchandise labeled with prices, money back guarantees, and charge accounts. The store was very successful, achieving sales of $1,331,000 in 1898, $2,000,000 in 1908, $6,300,000 in 1913 and to a peak of $38,000,000 in 1928, the fourth highest in national department store total sales and the country's highest in per capita sales. Radio station WOR was launched in the store with Fuld's approval in 1922. Many of Bamberger's employees went on to successful careers in other notable stores: Harry Hatry became president of Jay Thorpe, Inc. in New York; James Schoff became president of Bloomingdale's; Max Robb became president of Lit Brothers, Philadelphia; Hector Suyker became president of The Fair Store, Chicago; and Pasqualo Gueriere became president of Kresge-Newark. When Bamberger's was sold to Macy's in 1929 for an estimated $25,000,000, the partners, Fuld and Bamberger, set aside $1,000,000 to be divided among their ″co-workers″ (how they insisted employees be referred to).

== Philanthropic work ==
With his business partner and brother-in-law, Louis Bamberger, Felix Fuld contributed to numerous Newark and New Jersey institutions. They helped launch a building drive for the Newark YM-YWHA in 1922 that led to the construction of the 652 High Street building (Now 652 MLK Blvd) which opened in 1924, with an auditorium named 'Fuld Hall'. They were also major donors to the first hospital in Newark that freely offered a place for Jewish doctors to practice, Beth Israel Hospital. Fuld provided one third of Beth's original funding.

== Personal life ==
The three initial Bamberger's partners (Frank, Bamberger, and Fuld) lived together with Bamberger's sister Caroline (Carrie) Bamberger, who was Frank's wife at that time, in a rented house in South Orange, New Jersey. They later bought a large home on Centre Street in South Orange. Louis Frank died suddenly in 1910. Carrie Bamberger Frank remained a widow for three years until 1913 when she married Felix Fuld. The Fulds continued to live with Louis Bamberger until Fulds death in 1929. After an influenza infection, Felix Fuld died of pneumonia on January 20, 1929, at his home in South Orange. A memorial service was held in the Old First Presbyterian Church in Newark attended by many of the city's notables. He was buried at the B'nai Jeshurun Cemetery, Elizabeth, New Jersey.
