= Moses Hutzler =

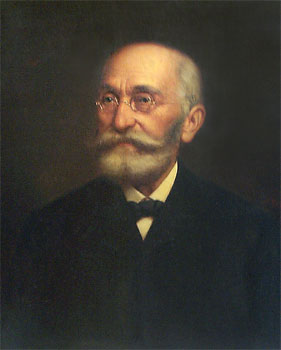
- Moses Hutzler, 1888, Portrait by Louis Dieterich (1842–1922)
- Born: November 28, 1800; Hagenbach, Bavaria, Germany
- Died: January 13, 1889 (age 88); Baltimore, Maryland
- Occupation: Businessman
- Spouse: Caroline Neuberger
- Children: 7 including Abram G. Hutzler
- Family: Louis Bamberger (grandson); Caroline Bamberger Fuld (granddaughter)

Moses Hutzler (November 28, 1800 – January 13, 1889) was a German-born American businessman and co-founder of the first Reform Jewish congregation in the United States, Har Sinai.

== Biography ==
Moses Hutzler was born in Hagenbach, Bavaria, the son of and Beuleh (née Baer) and Gabriel Hutzler. After attending school in Hagenbach, he learned the tailoring and dry-goods business. In December 1839, he emigrated to the United States and opened a tailoring shop for women in Baltimore, Maryland which was unsuccessful. He then moved to Frederick, Maryland where he opened a haberdashery business. In 1840, he returned to Baltimore. In 1858, his son Abram G. (1836-1927) opened the company M. Hutzler & Son as Moses signed the note backing the company. After two of his other sons, Charles G. (1840-1907) and David (1843-1915), joined the business, it was redenominated Hutzler Brothers. Hutzler's became the premier department store in Baltimore.

In May 1842, Hutzler founded the Har Sinai Association, an association of reform-minded Jews in Baltimore that formed a community modeled on the Hamburg Temple. The meetings were initially held in Hutzler's house and it was not until 1855 that David Einhorn became the first permanent rabbi.

== Personal life ==
Hutzler married twice. His first wife was Sophie Hutzler; they had two children that lived to adulthood:

1. Babette Hutzler (born 1824), married Abraham Gold, 4 children
2. Caroline Hutzler (1828–1907), married Edward Goldsmith, 9 children

In 1829, he married Caroline Neuberger (born 1804), the daughter of Eli B. Neuberger, a merchant. They had five children that lived to adulthood:

1. Theresa Hutzler (1830–1896), married Elkan Bamberger, 7 children including Louis Bamberger and Caroline Bamberger Fuld (married to Felix Fuld)
2. Rosa Hutzler (1834–1910), married Levi Spandaeur, 9 children
3. Abraham G. Hutzler (1836–1927)
4. Charles Gabriel Hutzler (1840–1907), married Henrietta Sonneborn, 7 children
5. David Hutzler, married Alla Joline Gutman, 6 children

He died in Baltimore, Maryland on January 13, 1889.
