= Security Square Mall =

Dead mall in Baltimore County, Maryland, U.S.

Coordinates: 39°18′33″N 76°44′59″W

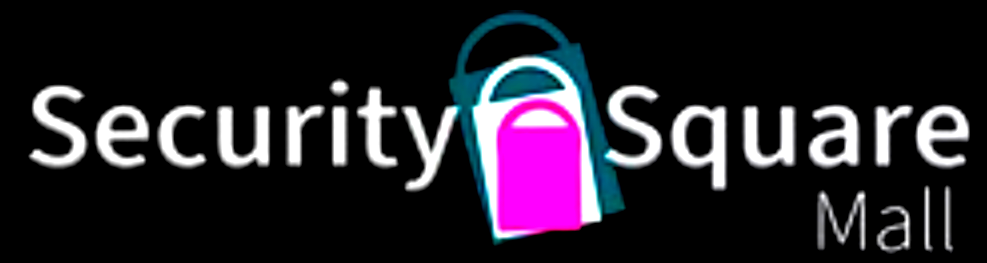

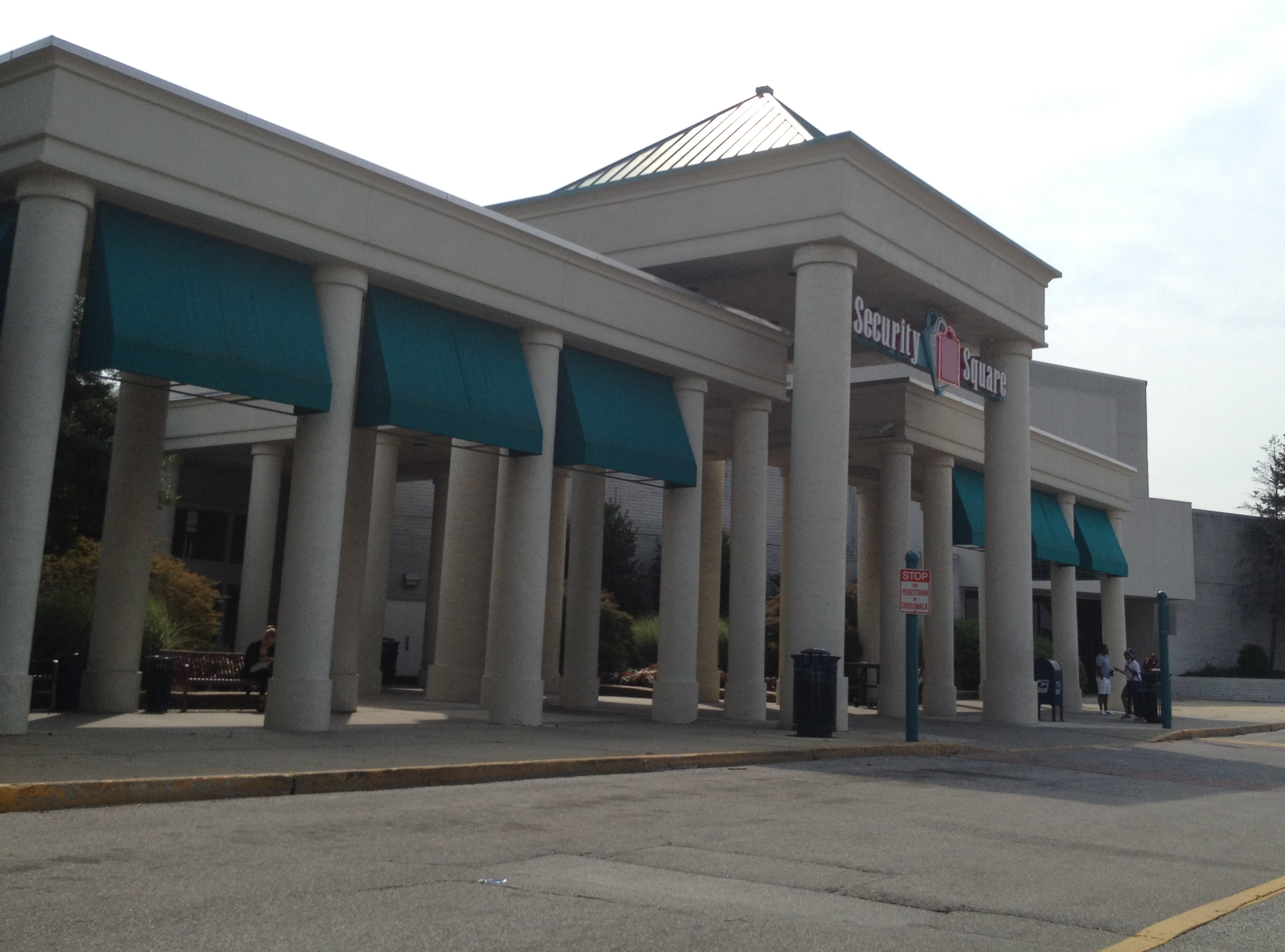
- Exterior view of Security Square Mall, July 2012
- Location: Woodlawn, Maryland, U.S.
- Address: 6901 Security Blvd
- Opened: September 29, 1972; 54 years ago
- Developer: Edward J. DeBartolo Corporation
- Manager: Hicks & Rotner Retail Inc.
- Owner: Capital Investment Associates
- Num. of stores: 120
- Num. of anchor tenants: 5 (2 open, 3 vacant)
- Floor area: 1,040,000 sq ft (97,000 m^{2})
- Floors: 1 (2 in Set the Captives Free Outreach Center, former Macy’s, and former Sears)
- Public transit: MTA Maryland bus: 31, 37, 78, 79, CityLink Blue
- Website: www.securitysquare.com

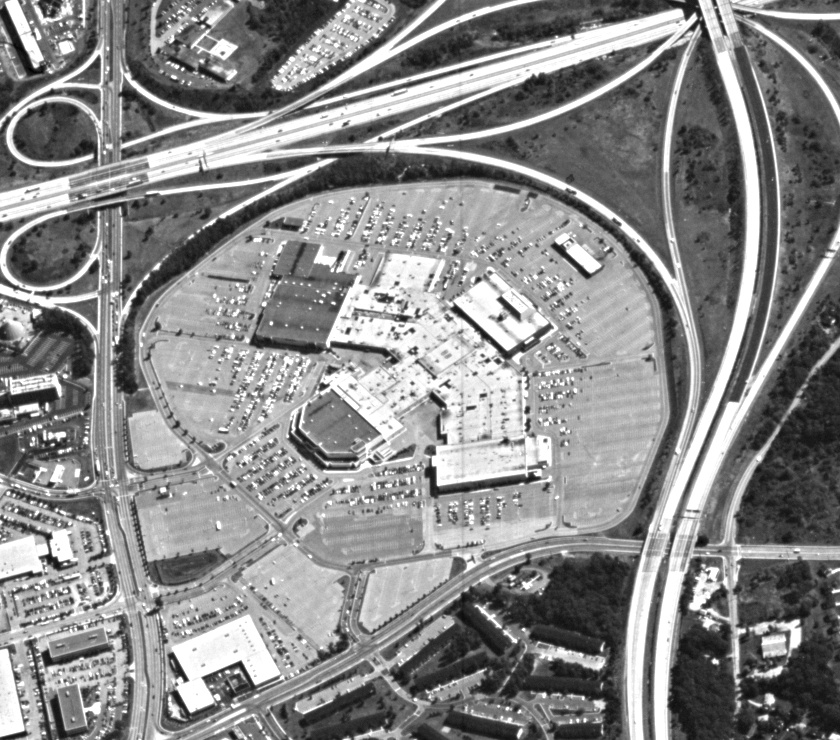
Oblique view of the mall in 1984

Security Square Mall is a mall in Woodlawn, Maryland, a suburb of Baltimore, in the United States. The mall features over 100 stores and restaurants, as well as a food court. One anchor store of the mall, the former JCPenney, previously included Korean shops and restaurants in an establishment called Seoul Plaza (later Grand Village Plaza), however, most of these establishments had closed by 2010. Security Square Mall is located adjacent to the North American School of Trades. The only traditional anchor store is Bayit Furniture. Set the Captives Free Outreach Center takes up the space previously occupied by Seoul Plaza. There are three vacant anchor stores that once housed Sears, Burlington, and Macy's.

== History ==
=== Anchor stores ===
Security Square Mall opened on September 29, 1972. Original anchors were Sears and Hochschild Kohn's which sold its store to Hutzler's, who closed the store in 1989, and subsequently sold it to Montgomery Ward, which moved from a location on U.S. Route 40 in Catonsville that is now occupied by Walmart. The mall was built by the Edward J. DeBartolo corporation but sold to JMB Urban Realty in 1983. Hecht's opened an anchor store in a new building in August 1979.

=== Decline ===
Woolworth closed in 1997 and was replaced by Burlington Coat Factory. Montgomery Ward closed in 2001 and became Modell's Sporting Goods three years later.

JCPenney closed its store at Security Square in 2001 due to declining sales. Two years later, the two-story JCPenney space was converted to Seoul Plaza, a "mall within a mall" consisting of several Korean shops and restaurants, as well as a Grand Mart supermarket. The Grand Mart closed in May 2008. Modell's closed in mid-2008. In 2005, home goods retailer Anna's Linens opened its first Maryland store at Security Square. One year later, Hecht's was converted to Macy's.

In 2018, Seoul Plaza was renamed to Grand Village Plaza. In 2018, Seoul Plaza was renamed to Grand Village Plaza. By June 2018, the property was described as formerly known as Seoul Plaza. Set the Captives Free Outreach Center purchased the property on June 25, 2018.

On August 6, 2019, it was announced that Sears would be closing in October 2019 as part of a plan to close 26 stores nationwide which left Burlington and Macy's as the only anchors left.

In July 2021, a shooting occurred at the facility.

On January 9, 2025, it was announced that Macy's store would be closing in March 2025 as part of a plan to close 66 stores nationwide. The store closed on March 23, 2025.

=== Renovations ===
Privately held realty company Capital Investment Associates purchased Security Square Mall and hired Hicks & Rotner Retail, Inc. to manage leasing. The next year, as part of its plan to revitalize, and make an upscale shift in the mall, the new management team signed eight new retailers including Hecht's (a relocation from its closed store in Edmondson Village). It also redesigned other parts of the mall including the food court (in the former space of the GC cinemas that had moved to a new standalone building on the south parking lot), restrooms, and landscaping.

In 1999, the mall increased security measures throughout, including the relocation of the security offices to center court.

On April 26, 2022, local (Baltimore County Executive Johnny Olszewski) and state (House Speaker Adrienne Jones) leaders announced major funding for the effort of a $20 million revitalization of the area around the mall.

== Transportation ==
Security Square Mall is very close to the Baltimore Beltway's Exit 17. While this exit cannot be accessed by motorists on I-70, there is an exit to Security Boulevard from the end of I-70 about 2 mi (3.2 km) from the mall.

The parking lot of the mall is a hub for several Maryland Transit Administration bus routes. Some routes operate to other nearby locations between 1 a.m. and 6 a.m. when the mall's bus stop is closed.
