= List of Cole Prize winners affiliated with the Institute for Advanced Study =

This is a comprehensive list of Cole Prize winners affiliated with the Institute for Advanced Study (IAS) in Princeton, New Jersey as current and former faculty members, visiting scholars, and other affiliates. Of the fifty-six mathematicians who have received the Cole Prize as of 2016, thirty-nine have been affiliated with the IAS at some point in their career.

The Cole Prize is one of two prizes awarded to mathematicians by the American Mathematical Society.

Frank Nelson Cole Prize in Algebra
Year	Prize winner	Years affiliated with IAS
1939	Abraham Adrian Albert	1933–1934
1944	Oscar Zariski	1934–1935, 1960
1949	Richard Brauer	1934–1935, 1942, 1969
1954	Harish-Chandra	1947–1949, 1955–1956, 1961–1962
1960	Serge Lang	1952–1953, 1975
1965	Walter Feit	1958–1959
1965	John G. Thompson	1978
1970	John R. Stallings	1961–1962, 1971–1972
1975	Hyman Bass	1965, 1966
1975	Daniel G. Quillen	1969–1970
1980	Michael Aschbacher	1978–1979
1985	George Lusztig	1969–1971, 1988, 1998–1999
1995	Michel Raynaud	1981
2000	Andrei Suslin	2004–2005
2003	Hiraku Nakajima	1998–1999, 2007–2008
2005	Peter Sarnak	1999–2000, 2002, 2005–current
2006	János Kollár	1986, 2014–2015
Frank Nelson Cole Prize in Number Theory
Year	Prize winner	Years affiliated with IAS
1941	Claude Chevalley	1938–1939
1951	Paul Erdős	1938–1940
1956	John T. Tate	1959–1960
1962	Kenkichi Iwasawa	1950–1952, 1957–1958, 1966–1967, 1971, 1979, 1985
1962	Bernard M. Dwork	1961–1962, 1983–1984
1967	Simon B. Kochen	1966–1967, 1978–1979
1972	Wolfgang M. Schmidt	1970–1971, 1985–1986
1977	Goro Shimura	1958–1959, 1967–1968, 1970–1971, 1974–1975, 1979, 1983
1982	Robert P. Langlands	1962–1963, 1972–current
1982	Barry Mazur	1958–1959, 1962, 1983
1987	Dorian M. Goldfeld	1973–1974, 1979
1992	Karl Rubin	1983–1984, 1995–1996
1992	Paul Vojta	1989–1990, 1996–1997
1997	Andrew J. Wiles	1981, 1992, 1995–2004, 2007–2011
2002	Henryk Iwaniec	1983–1986
2002	Richard Taylor	2010–current
2008	Manjul Bharğava	2001–2002
2011	Chandrashekhar Khare	2010–2011
2014	Yitang Zhang	2014
2014	Daniel Goldston	1982–2083, 1990
2014	János Pintz	1990–2091, 2009
2014	Cem Y. Yıldırım	2009
2020	James Maynard	2017
2023	Jack Thorne	2010-2011
