= Theodore Hetzler =

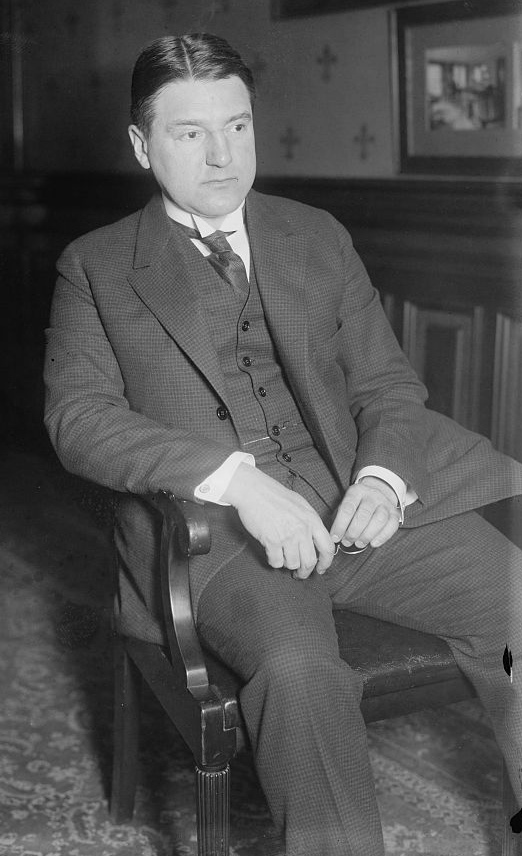
Hetzler in 1916

Theodore Hetzler, Sr. (June 13, 1875 – August 12, 1945) was president and later chairman of the board of the Fifth Avenue Bank.

== Biography ==
He was born on June 13, 1875. He married Mary Regis Smith and they had a son, Theodore Hetzler, Jr.

He started work at the Fifth Avenue Bank as a messenger. In 1914 he was working as a cashier and was promoted to a vice president. In 1916 he was named president.

He died on August 12, 1945. His widow died in 1961.
