= Bamberger's =

American department store

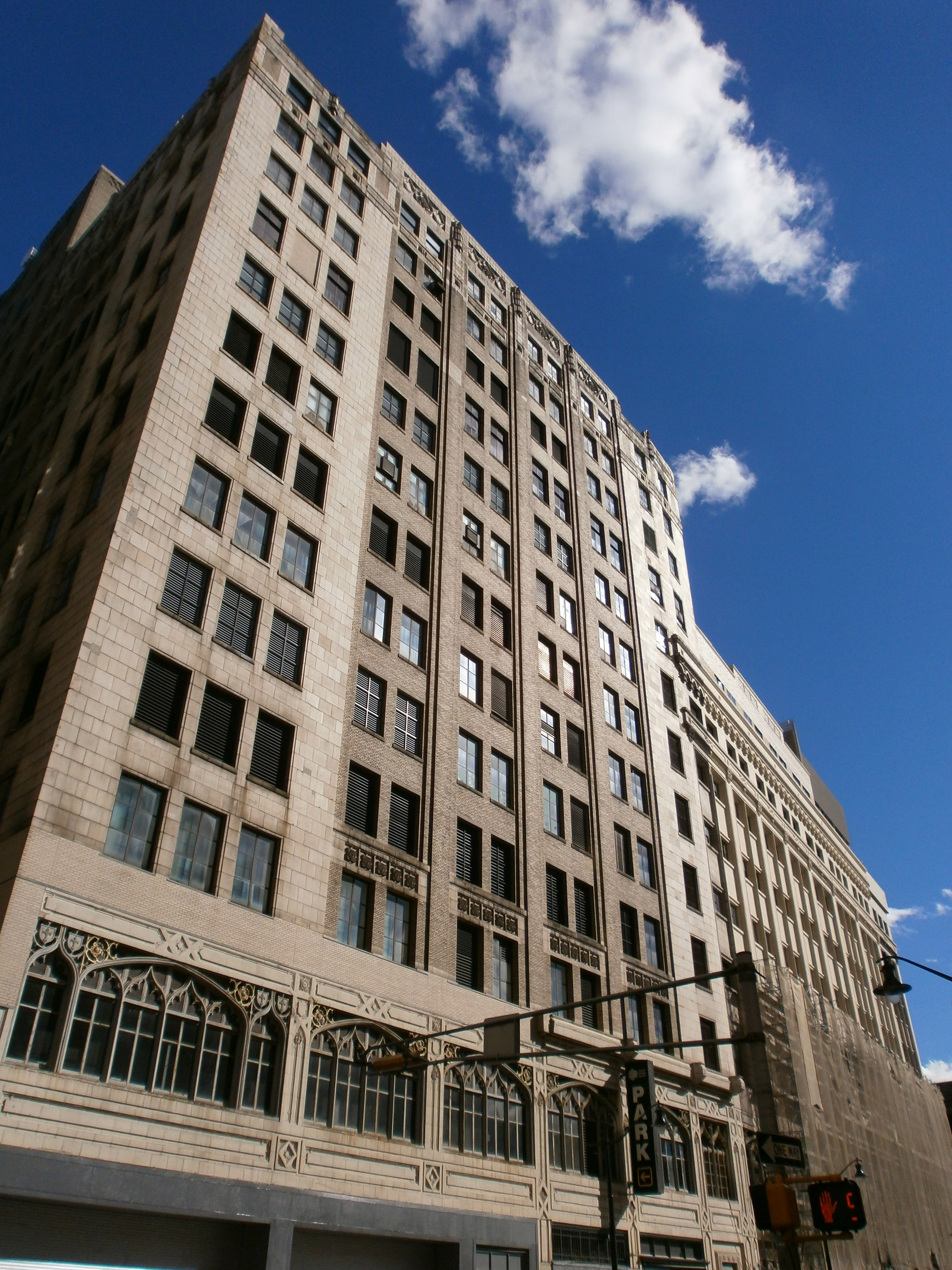
- Exterior of the former Bamberger's flagship store in Newark (2012)
- Type: Subsidiary
- Industry: Retail
- Genre: Department stores
- Founded: 1893; 133 years ago in Newark, New Jersey, United States
- Founders: Louis Bamberger; Louis M. Frank; Felix Fuld
- Defunct: 1986; 40 years ago
- Fate: Conversion to Macy's
- Successor: Macy's
- Headquarters: Newark, New Jersey, United States
- Areas served: Delaware; Maryland; New Jersey; New York; Pennsylvania
- Products: Clothing; footwear; bedding; furniture; jewelry; beauty products; electronics; housewares
- Parent: Macy's (1929–1986)

Bamberger's was an American department store chain founded in 1893 by Louis Bamberger, Louis M. Frank, and Felix Fuld. It was headquartered in Newark, New Jersey.

Bamberger's logo (1975-1986)

== History ==
=== 19th century ===
Newark was a major manufacturing center in the latter half of the 19th century. By 1892, Newark was the fourth largest American city and it manufactured products from leather to jewelry along with it being a rail hub. It also had a large Jewish population.

These factors led Felix Fuld, Louis M. Frank, and Louis Bamberger to found the store on Dec 13, 1892 on Market Street on the corner of Halsey Street in Newark, New Jersey, taking over the location of a bankrupt store Hill & Craig. Fuld and Frank were Bamberger's brothers-in-law.

=== 20th century ===
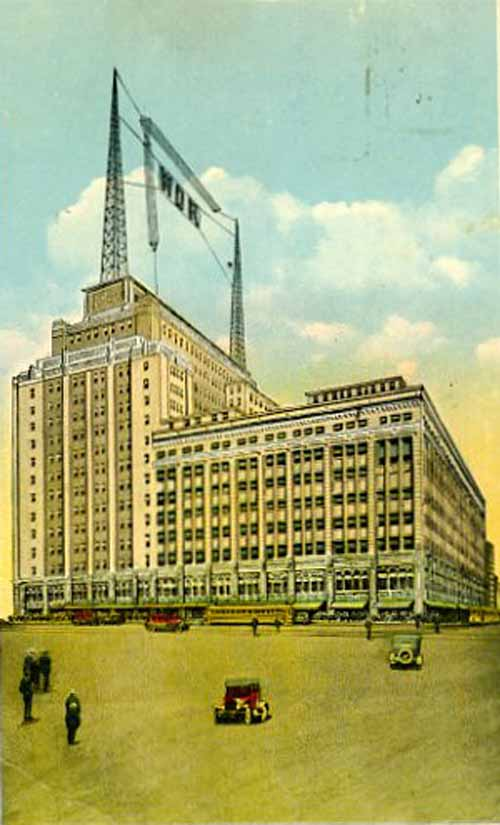
A 1922 illustration of the Newark store, where Bamberger's launched WOR radio on the sixth floor to sell more radios

On October 16, 1912, the company opened its flagship store, designed by Jarvis Hunt, at 131 Market Street in downtown Newark. The historic building once ranked among the nation's largest department stores; after an expansion in 1929 it was the nation's sixth largest.

The massive building covered an entire city block, bounded by Market, Washington, Bank and Halsey Streets, encompassing 1.2 million square feet. The phone exchange, 565, was devoted solely to Bamberger's, with local direct-dial numbers for most of New Jersey's suburbs for telephone orders, known as "TeleService". The building's loading dock was located well below ground on the fourth-basement level. Two massive elevators carried fully loaded 33 ft trucks from Washington Street down to the loading docks.

The store contained more than 200 departments across nine floors and two basement levels. There was a restaurant on the tenth floor. Bamberger's had its own Newark Public Library branch and US Post Office branch. It sold customized linens, engraved jewelry, furs and other speciality items.

In June 1929, Bamberger's was purchased by R.H. Macy & Co., but the name remained Bamberger's. In the years immediately following World War II, the store was reorganized to become more "mainstream". In 1955, the tenth-floor restaurant complex was leased to the private Downtown Club. Dining service for customers continued at The Dinette, a counter style room on the first basement level and snack bars on the first and fourth floors. Eventually the lower-level eatery was remodeled into a formal restaurant named the Garden State Tea Room.

The 1960s and 1970s saw expansion throughout the state of New Jersey and into the Greater Philadelphia metropolitan area, and by the 1980s there were branches opened in the Pittsburgh, Pennsylvania & Baltimore, Maryland metropolitan area. On October 5, 1986, the Bamberger's stores adopted the name Macy's New Jersey, and in 1988, Macy's New Jersey was consolidated with sister division Macy's New York to form Macy's Northeast (now Macy's, Inc.).

As North Jersey's population grew, Bamberger's followed the suburban population aggressively. Suburban branches of L. Bamberger & Co. were later opened in Morristown, Plainfield, and at Princeton, New Jersey. According to Greg Hatala, for nj.com, "With the post-World War II population shift towards the suburbs of major cities, Bamberger's built additional stores in locations such as East Brunswick, Garden State Plaza, Livingston Mall, Monmouth Mall, Nanuet Mall, Ocean County Mall, and Menlo Park Mall. In 1970, the East Brunswick location became an anchor store for the Brunswick Square Mall".

Sales at the downtown Newark store declined after the Newark civil unrest of 1967; sales space was decreased and the store repositioned as a value-oriented location. Evening hours were eliminated downtown by 1979. The Newark location operated as Macy's until it was closed in 1992. The building became 165 Halsey Street and serves the telecommunication, colocation, and computer support industries.

== WOR radio ==
WOR radio was established by Bamberger Broadcasting Service in 1922. The broadcast studio was located on the sixth floor of its downtown headquarters In the 1920s, it was the first radio station on the East Coast to broadcast opera and a morning exercise program. Its FM station, W2XOR (then W71NY, now WEPN-FM) began broadcasting in 1940 or 1941. On October 11, 1949, WOR-TV (channel 9) signed on the air, becoming the last of the New York metropolitan area VHF television stations to begin operations; in the same year, Bamberger was re-incorporated to General Teleradio, in part due to General Tire and Rubber's increased investment in the station. Transmission was from the WOR TV Tower in North Bergen, New Jersey, until 1953, and from the Empire State Building thereafter. In 1952, General Tire acquired General Teleradio from Macy's, merging it with the Don Lee Network to form General Tire's broadcasting division.

Bamberger's_Department_Store_Final_Logo

== See also ==
- List of department stores converted to Macy's
- List of defunct department stores of the United States
