= Institute for Advanced Study =

Postgraduate center in New Jersey, US

Coordinates: 40°19′54″N 74°40′04″W

- Motto: Truth and Beauty
- Type: Private
- Established: 1930; 96 years ago
- Founder: Abraham Flexner
- Endowment: $784.7 million (2020)
- Director: David Nirenberg
- Academic staff: 25 (current faculty only)
- Administrative staff: 26
- Students: None
- Location: Princeton, New Jersey, US
- Campus: Suburban
- Website: www.ias.edu

The Institute for Advanced Study (IAS) is a center for theoretical research and intellectual inquiry, designed and funded by the U.S. government, the Rockefeller Foundation and the Carnegie Endowment, located in Princeton, New Jersey. It has served as the academic home of internationally preeminent scholars, including Albert Einstein, J. Robert Oppenheimer, Emmy Noether, Hermann Weyl, John von Neumann, Michael Walzer, Clifford Geertz, Freeman Dyson and Kurt Gödel, many of whom had emigrated from Europe to the United States.

It was founded in 1930 by American educator Abraham Flexner, together with philanthropists Louis Bamberger and Caroline Bamberger Fuld. Despite collaboration and neighboring geographic location, the institute is independent and has no formal ties to Princeton University. Having no students, the institute does not charge tuition or fees.

Flexner's guiding principle in founding the institute was the pursuit of knowledge for its own sake. The faculty have no classes to teach. There are no degree programs or experimental facilities at the institute. Research is never contracted or directed. It is left to each individual researcher to pursue their own goals. Established during the rise of fascism in Europe, the institute played a key role in the transfer of intellectual capital from Europe to America. It quickly earned its reputation as the pinnacle of academic and scientific life—a reputation it has retained.

The institute consists of four schools: Historical Studies, Mathematics, Natural Sciences, and Social Sciences. The institute also has a program in Systems Biology.

It is supported entirely by endowments, grants, and gifts. It is one of eight American mathematics institutes funded by the National Science Foundation. It is the model for all ten members of the consortium Some Institutes for Advanced Study.

== History ==
=== Founding ===
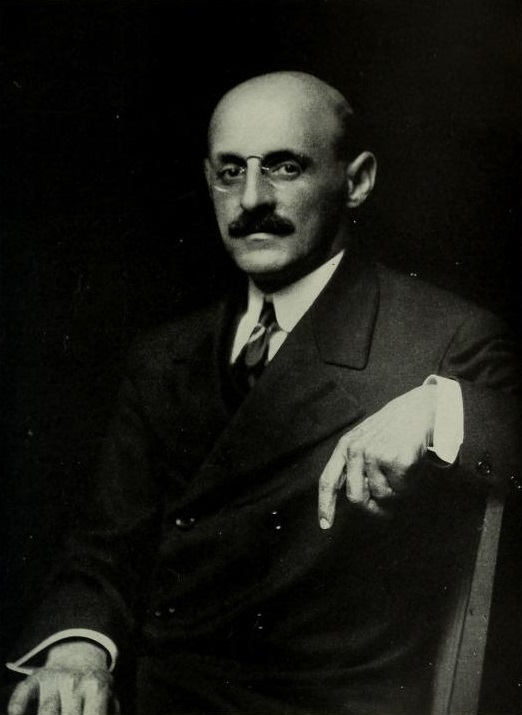
Abraham Flexner

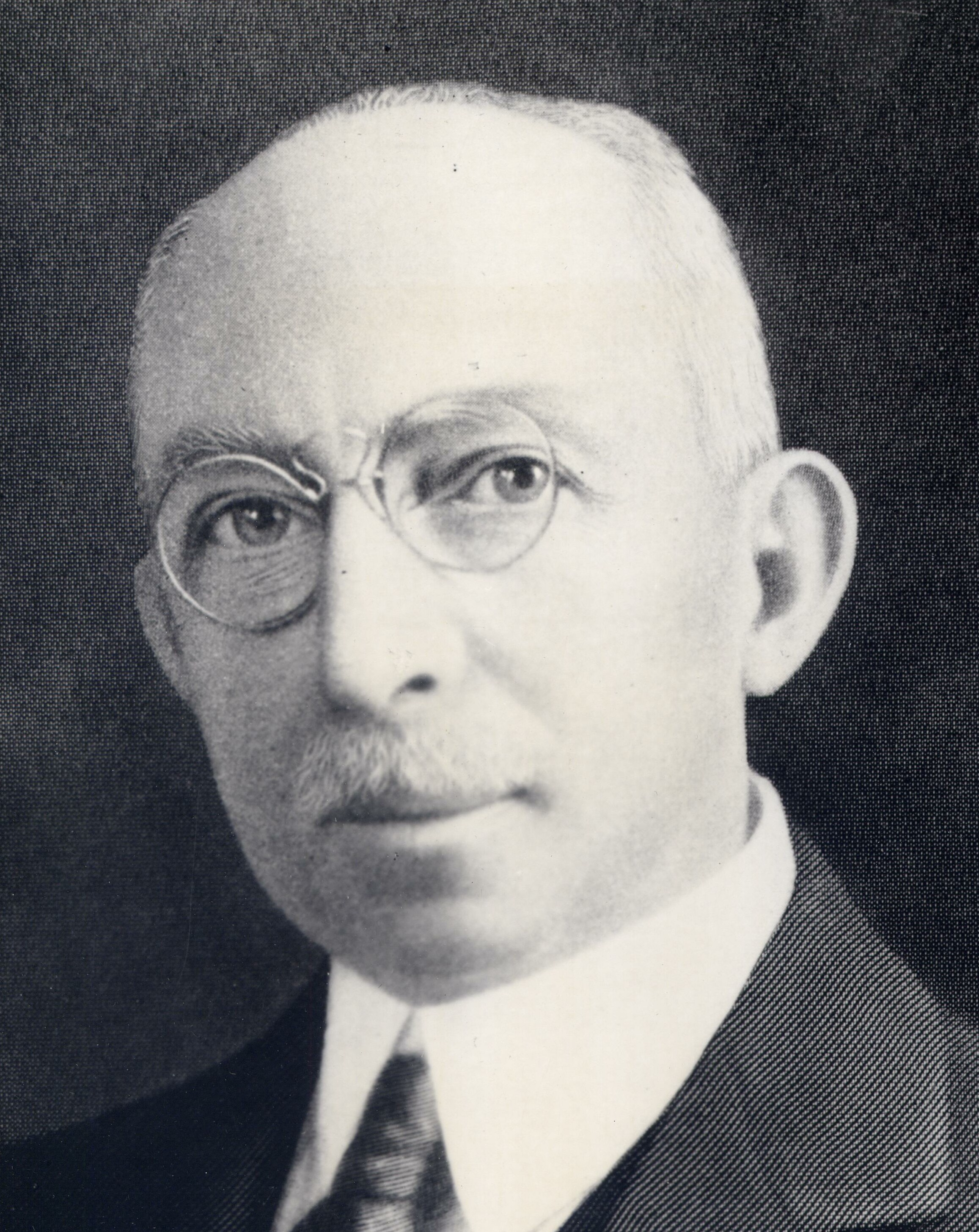
Louis Bamberger

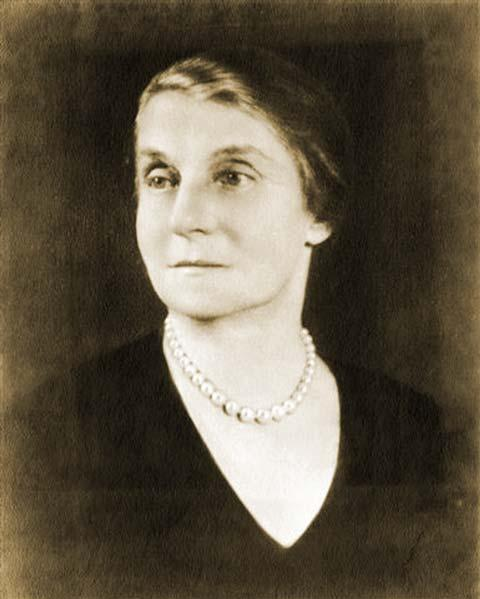
Caroline Bamberger Fuld

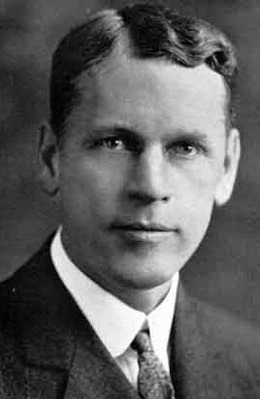
Oswald Veblen (c. 1915)

The institute was founded in 1930 by Abraham Flexner, together with philanthropists Louis Bamberger and Caroline Bamberger Fuld. Flexner was interested in education generally, and as early as 1890 he had founded an experimental school which had no formal curriculum, exams, or grades. It was a great success at preparing students for prestigious colleges, and this same philosophy would later guide him in the founding of the Institute for Advanced Study.

Flexner's study of medical schools, the 1910 Flexner Report, played a major role in the reform of medical education. Flexner had studied European schools such as Heidelberg University, All Souls College, Oxford, and the Collège de France–and he wanted to establish a similar advanced research center in the United States.

In his autobiography, Abraham Flexner reports a phone call which he received in the fall of 1929 from representatives of the Bamberger siblings that led to their partnership and the eventual founding of the IAS:

I was working quietly one day when the telephone rang and I was asked to see two gentlemen who wished to discuss with me the possible uses to which a considerable sum of money might be placed. At our interview, I informed them that my competency was limited to the education field and that in this field it seemed to me that the time was ripe for the creation in America of an institute in the field of general scholarship and science, resembling the Rockefeller Institute in the field of medicine—developed by my brother Simon—not a graduate school, training men in the known and to some extent in methods of research, but an institute where everyone—faculty and members—took for granted what was known and published, and in their individual ways, endeavored to advance the frontiers of knowledge.

The Bamberger siblings wanted to use the proceeds from the sale of their Bamberger's department store in Newark, New Jersey, to fund a dental school as an expression of gratitude to the state of New Jersey. Flexner convinced them to put their money in the service of more abstract research. (There was a brush with near-disaster when the Bambergers pulled their money out of the market just before the Crash of 1929.) The eminent topologist Oswald Veblen at Princeton University, who had long been trying to found a high-level research institute in mathematics, urged Flexner to locate the new institute near Princeton where it would be close to an existing center of learning and a world-class library. In 1932 Veblen resigned from Princeton and became the first professor in the new Institute for Advanced Study. He selected most of the original faculty and also helped the institute acquire land in Princeton for both the original facility and future expansion.

Flexner and Veblen set out to recruit the best mathematicians and physicists they could find. The rise of fascism and the associated anti-semitism forced many prominent mathematicians to flee Europe and some, such as Einstein and Hermann Weyl (whose wife was Jewish), found a home at the new institute. Weyl as a condition of accepting insisted that the institute also appoint the thirty-year-old Austrian-Hungarian polymath John von Neumann. Indeed, the IAS became the key lifeline for scholars fleeing Europe. Einstein was Flexner's first coup and shortly after that he was followed by Veblen's brilliant student James Alexander and the wunderkind of logic Kurt Gödel. Flexner was fortunate in the luminaries he directly recruited but also in the people that they brought along with them. Thus, by 1934 the fledgeling institute was led by six of the most prominent mathematicians in the world. In 1935 quantum physics pioneer Wolfgang Pauli became a faculty member. With the opening of the Institute for Advanced Study, Princeton replaced Göttingen as the leading center for mathematics in the twentieth century.

=== Early years ===
For the six years from its opening in 1933, until Fuld Hall was finished and opened in 1939, the institute was housed within Princeton University—in Fine Hall, which housed Princeton's mathematics department. Princeton University's science departments are less than two miles away and informal ties and collaboration between the two institutions occurred from the beginning. This helped start an incorrect impression that it was part of the university, one that has never been completely eradicated.

On June 4, 1930, the Bambergers wrote as follows to the institute's trustees:

It is fundamental in our purpose, and our express desire, that in the appointments to the staff and faculty, as well as in the admission of workers and students, no account shall be taken, directly or indirectly, of race, religion, or sex. We feel strongly that the spirit characteristic of America at its noblest, above all the pursuit of higher learning, cannot admit of any conditions as to personnel other than those designed to promote the objects for which this institution is established, and particularly with no regard whatever to accidents of race, creed, or sex.

Bamberger's policy did not prevent racial discrimination by Princeton. When African-American mathematician William S. Claytor applied to the IAS in 1937, Princeton University said they "would not permit any colored person to go to the Institute for Advanced Study." In 1939, when the institute had moved into its own building, Veblen was able to offer Claytor a position; but Claytor turned it down on principle. The first African-American mathematician to visit the IAS was David Blackwell in 1941, with another visiting the next year. Six Chinese physicists visited the IAS by 1949.

Women joined the IAS since its opening in 1933, and faced discrimination as they tried to pursue scientific careers. Emmy Noether and Anna Stafford Henriques were two of the earliest women to study at the IAS. The first and only woman professor at the IAS from 1936 until 1972 was Hetty Goldman, in the School of Humanistic Studies. In 1945, Cheng-Shu Wang Chang became the first non-white woman to visit the IAS.

=== Expansion ===
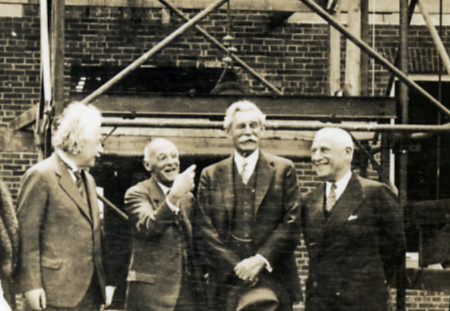
left to right: Albert Einstein, Abraham Flexner, John R. Hardin, and Herbert Maass at the IAS on May 22, 1939

Flexner had successfully assembled a faculty of unrivaled prestige in the School of Mathematics which officially opened in 1933. He sought to equal this success in the founding of schools of economics and humanities but this proved to be more difficult. The School of Humanistic Studies and the School of Economics and Politics were established in 1935. All three schools along with the office of the director moved into the newly built Fuld Hall in 1939. (Ultimately the schools of Humanistic Studies and Economics and Politics were merged into the present day School of Historical Studies established in 1949.) In the beginning, the School of Mathematics included physicists as well as mathematicians. A separate School of Natural Sciences was not established until 1966. The School of Social Science was founded in 1973.

Faculty representation continued to change throughout the 2000s. The IAS's first African-American permanent faculty member joined in 2007. In 2024, the School of Mathematics hired its first woman permanent faculty member.

== Mission ==
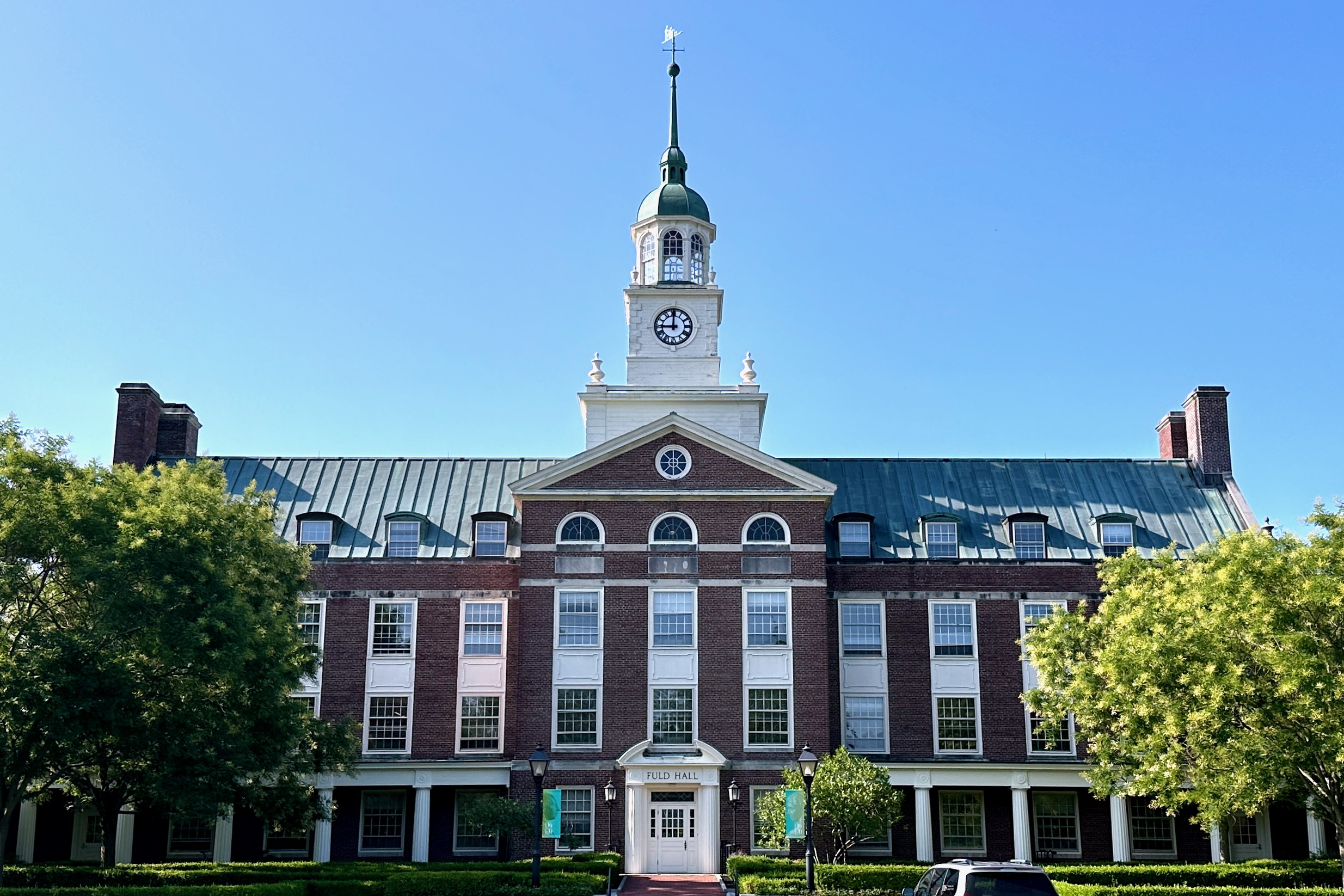
Fuld Hall, built 1939

In a 1939 essay Flexner emphasized how James Clerk Maxwell, driven only by a desire to know, did abstruse calculations in the field of magnetism and electricity and that these investigations led in a direct line to the entire electrical development of modern times. Citing Maxwell and other theoretical scientists such as Carl Friedrich Gauss, Michael Faraday, Paul Ehrlich and Einstein, Flexner said, "Throughout the whole history of science most of the really great discoveries which have ultimately proved to be beneficial to mankind have been made by men and women who were driven not by the desire to be useful but merely the desire to satisfy their curiosity."

The IAS Bluebook says:

The Institute for Advanced Study is one of the few institutions in the world where the pursuit of knowledge for its own sake is the ultimate raison d'être. Speculative research, the kind that is fundamental to the advancement of human understanding of the world of nature and of humanity, is not a product that can be made to order. Rather, like artistic creativity, it benefits from a special environment.

This was the belief which continues to inspire the institute today.

== Impact ==
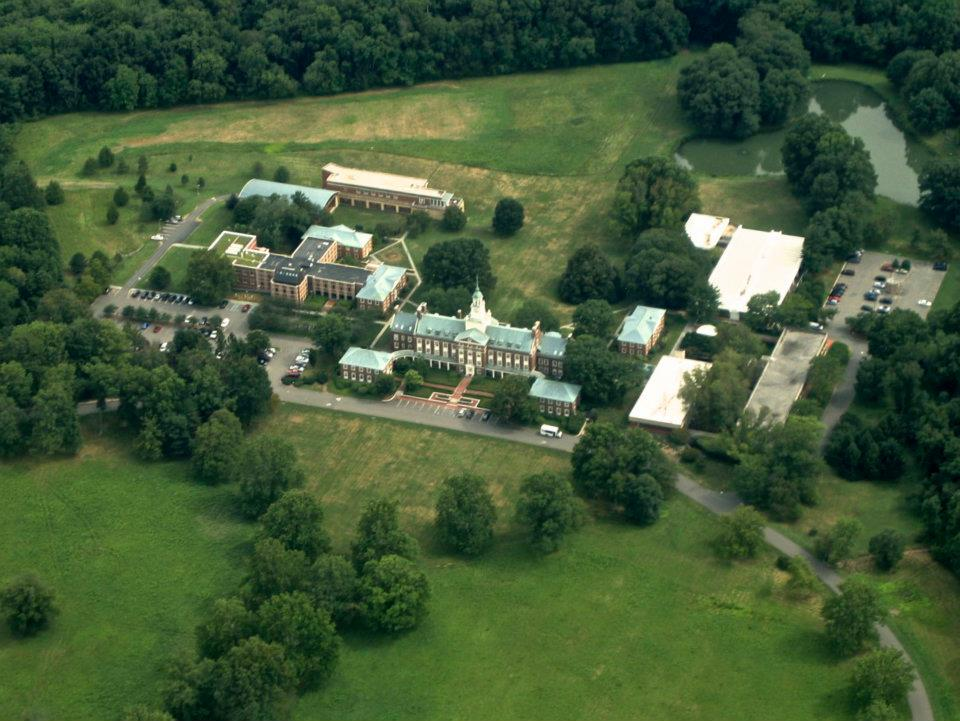
Bird's eye view of the Institute for Advanced Study campus

From the day it opened the IAS had a major impact on mathematics, physics, economic theory, and world affairs. In mathematics forty-two out of sixty-one Fields Medalists have been affiliated with the institute. Thirty-four Nobel Laureates have worked at the IAS. Of the sixteen Abel Prizes awarded since the establishment of that award in 2003, nine were garnered by Institute professors or visiting scholars. Of the fifty-six Cole Prizes awarded since the establishment of that award in 1928, thirty-nine have gone to scholars associated with the IAS at some point in their career. IAS people have won 20 Wolf Prizes in mathematics and physics. Its more than 6,000 former members hold positions of intellectual and scientific leadership throughout the academic world.

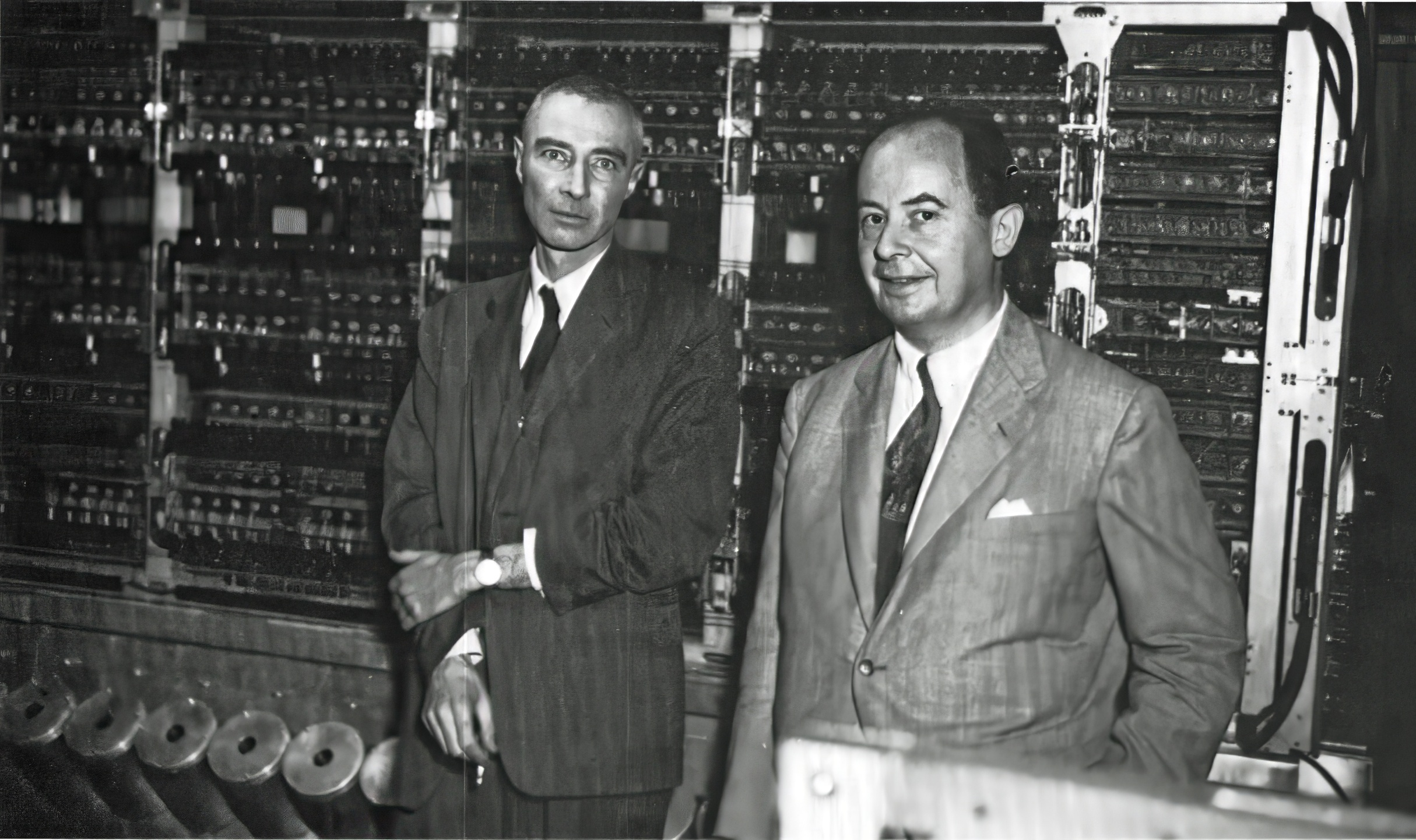
J. Robert Oppenheimer (left) and John von Neumann in front of the IAS machine (1952)

Pioneering work on the theory of the stored-program computer as laid down by Alan Turing was done at the IAS by John von Neumann, and the IAS machine built in the basement of the Fuld Hall from 1942 to 1951 under von Neumann's direction introduced the basic architecture of most modern digital computers. The IAS is the leading center of research in string theory and its generalization M-theory introduced by Edward Witten at the IAS in 1995. The Langlands program, a far-reaching approach which unites parts of geometry, mathematical analysis, and number theory was introduced by Robert Langlands, the mathematician who now occupies Albert Einstein's old office at the institute. Langlands was inspired by the work of Hermann Weyl, André Weil, and Harish-Chandra, all scholars with wide-ranging ties to the institute, and the IAS maintains the key repository for the papers of Langlands and the Langlands program. The IAS is a main center of research for homotopy type theory, a modern approach to the foundations of mathematics which is not based on classical set theory. A special year organized by Institute professor Vladimir Voevodsky and others resulted in a benchmark book in the subject which was published by the institute in 2013.

The institute is or has been the academic home of scholars like James Waddell Alexander II, Michael Atiyah, Enrico Bombieri, Shiing-Shen Chern, Pierre Deligne, Freeman Dyson, Albert Einstein, Clifford Geertz, Kurt Gödel, Albert Hirschman, George F. Kennan, Tsung-Dao Lee, Avishai Margalit, J. Robert Oppenheimer, Erwin Panofsky, Atle Selberg, John von Neumann, André Weil, Hermann Weyl, Frank Wilczek, Edward Witten, Chen-Ning Yang and Shing-Tung Yau.

== Special Year programs ==
Flexner's vision of the kind of results that can emerge in an institution devoted to the pursuit of knowledge for its own sake is illustrated by the "Special Year" programs sponsored by the IAS School of Mathematics. For example, in 2012–13 researchers at the IAS school of mathematics held A Special Year on Univalent Foundations of Mathematics. Intuitionistic type theory was created by the Swedish logician Per Martin-Löf in 1972 to serve as an alternative to set theory as a foundation for mathematics. The special year brought together researchers in topology, computer science, category theory, and mathematical logic with the goal of formalizing and extending this theory of foundations. The program was organized by Steve Awodey, Thierry Coquand and Vladimir Voevodsky, and resulted in a book being published in homotopy type theory. The authors—more than 30 researchers ultimately contributed to the project—noted the essential contribution of the IAS saying,

Special thanks are due to the Institute for Advanced Study, without which this book would obviously never have come to be. It proved to be an ideal setting for the creation of this new branch of mathematics: stimulating, congenial, and supportive. May some trace of this unique atmosphere linger in the pages of this book, and in the future development of this new field of study.

— The Univalent Foundations Program, Institute for Advanced Study Princeton, April 2013

One of the researchers, Andrej Bauer said,

We are a group of two dozen mathematicians who wrote a 600 page book in less than half a year. This is quite amazing, since mathematicians do not normally work together in large groups. But more importantly, the spirit of collaboration that pervaded our group at the Institute for Advanced Study was truly amazing. We did not fragment. We talked, shared ideas, explained things to each other, and completely forgot who did what.

— Andrej Bauer, Mathematics and Computation, June 20, 2013

The book, informally known as The HoTT book, is freely available online.

== School of Social Science ==
Founded in 1973, the School of Social Science is devoted to critical approaches to social research, both theoretical and empirical, and featuring multidisciplinary, multi-method and international perspectives. Wendy Brown, Didier Fassin, and Alondra Nelson are professors of the School of Social Science at the institute. Among past and emeritus faculty professors are Danielle S. Allen, Clifford Geertz, Albert O. Hirschman, Eric S. Maskin, Dani Rodrik, Joan Wallach Scott, and Michael Walzer.

== Criticism ==
Richard Feynman argued that the IAS does not offer real activity or challenge:

When I was at Princeton in the 1940s I could see what happened to those great minds at the Institute for Advanced Study, who had been specially selected for their tremendous brains and were now given this opportunity to sit in this lovely house by the woods there, with no classes to teach, with no obligations whatsoever. These poor bastards could now sit and think clearly all by themselves, OK? So they don't get any ideas for a while: They have every opportunity to do something, and they're not getting any ideas. I believe that in a situation like this a kind of guilt or depression worms inside of you, and you begin to worry about not getting any ideas. And nothing happens. Still no ideas come. Nothing happens because there's not enough real activity and challenge: You're not in contact with the experimental guys. You don't have to think how to answer questions from the students. Nothing!

— Richard Feynman

== Other Institutes for Advanced Study ==
The IAS in Princeton is widely recognized as the world's first Institute for Advanced Study. Despite later imitators of the institute's model, it took years before any similar institutions were founded. The Center for Advanced Study in the Behavioral Sciences at Stanford was the first such spinoff in 1954. This was followed by the National Humanities Center founded in North Carolina in 1978. These two institutions eventually became the core of a consortium known as Some Institutes for Advanced Study (SIAS). The SIAS consortium includes the original institute in Princeton and nine other institutes founded explicitly to emulate the model of the original IAS. These ten Institutes for Advanced Study are:

- Institute for Advanced Study in Princeton, New Jersey, United States
- Center for Advanced Study in the Behavioral Sciences in Stanford, California, U.S.
- National Humanities Center in Durham County, North Carolina, U.S.
- Radcliffe Institute for Advanced Study in Cambridge, Massachusetts, U.S.
- Netherlands Institute for Advanced Study in Amsterdam, the Netherlands
- Swedish Collegium for Advanced Study in Uppsala, Sweden
- Berlin Institute for Advanced Study in Berlin, Germany
- Israel Institute for Advanced Studies in Jerusalem
- Nantes Institute for Advanced Study Foundation in Nantes, France
- Stellenbosch Institute for Advanced Study in Stellenbosch, South Africa

In recent years there have been other institutes loosely based on the Princeton original, in some cases established with help from IAS professors. In 1997 IAS professor Chen-Ning Yang helped the Chinese set up the Institute for Advanced Study at Tsinghua University in Beijing. The Freiburg Institute for Advanced Studies in Freiburg, Germany was founded in 2007, with IAS director at the time Peter Goddard giving the inaugural address. Princeton IAS professors André Weil and Armand Borel helped to establish close contacts with the Ramanujan Institute for Advanced Study in Mathematics, founded in 1967 as part of the University of Madras in India.

The Institut des Hautes Études Scientifiques (IHÉS) founded in 1958 just south of Paris was inspired by the IAS in Princeton. Princeton Institute director Robert Oppenheimer had a close relationship with IHÉS founder Léon Motchane and played a major role in helping to get it established. The Dublin Institute for Advanced Studies, which focuses on theoretical physics, cosmic physics, and Celtic studies, was also based on the IAS, and was the second such institute when it was founded in 1940.

Neither the Princeton IAS nor SIAS is connected with, and should not be confused with, the Consortium of Institutes of Advanced Studies which comprises some twenty research institutes located throughout Great Britain and Ireland. The name Institute for Advanced Study, along with the acronym IAS, is also used by various other independent institutions throughout the world, some having little to do with the Princeton model. See Institute for Advanced Study (disambiguation) for a complete list.

== Directors, faculty and members ==
At any given time, the IAS has a faculty consisting of twenty-eight eminent academics who are appointed for life. Although the faculty do not teach classes (because there are none), they often do give lectures at their own initiative and have the title Professor along with the prestige associated with that title. Furthermore, they direct research and serve as the nucleus of a larger and generally younger group of scholars, whom they have the power to select and invite. Each year fellowships are awarded to about 190 visiting members from over 100 universities and research institutions who come to the institute for periods from one term to a few years. Individuals must apply to become members of the institute, and each of the schools has its own application procedures and deadlines.

Directors of the IAS
Name	Term
Abraham Flexner	1930–1939
Frank Aydelotte	1939–1947
J. Robert Oppenheimer	1947–1966
Carl Kaysen	1966–1976
Harry Woolf	1976–1987
Marvin Leonard Goldberger	1987–1991
Phillip Griffiths	1991–2003
Peter Goddard	2004–2012
Robbert Dijkgraaf	2012–2022
David Nirenberg	2022–present

== Campus, lands, Olden Farm and Olden Manor ==
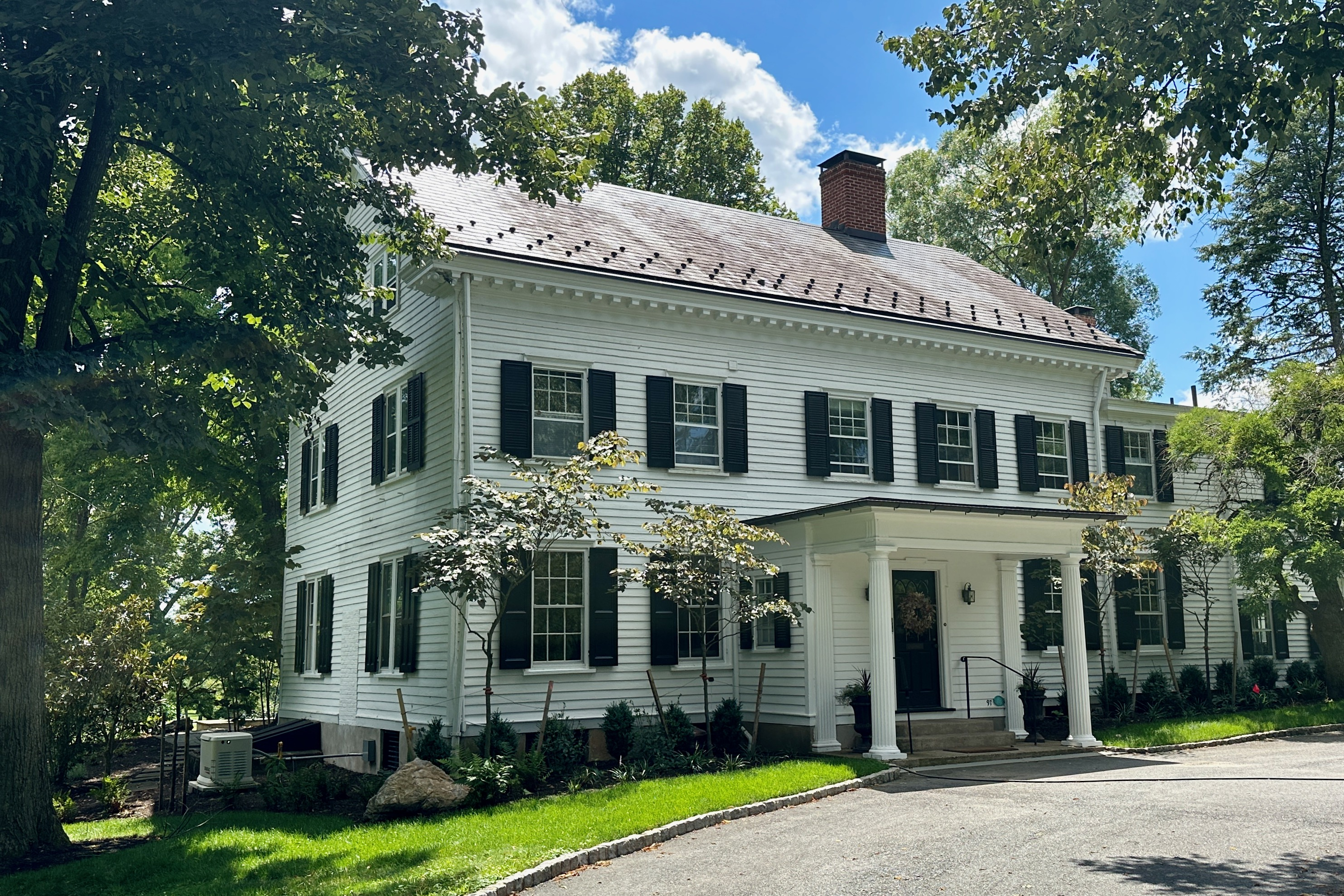
Olden Manor

The IAS owns over 600 acres of land, most of which was acquired between 1936 and 1945. Since 1997 the institute has preserved 589 acres of woods, wetlands, and farmland. By 1936, for total of $290,000, the founding trustees of the IAS had purchased 256 acres, including the two-hundred-acre Olden Farm with Olden Manor, which was the former home of William Olden. Olden Manor, with its extensive gardens, has been, since 1940, the residence of the institute's director.

Olden Manor is a substantial dwelling owned and maintained by the Institute and located on its main campus on Olden Lane in Princeton Township. It is the principal residence of the Director and his family, to whom it is furnished rent-free and as a term of his employment. It is also used by the Director, on behalf of the Institute, for official entertainment and for numerous faculty and trustees' meetings and conferences.

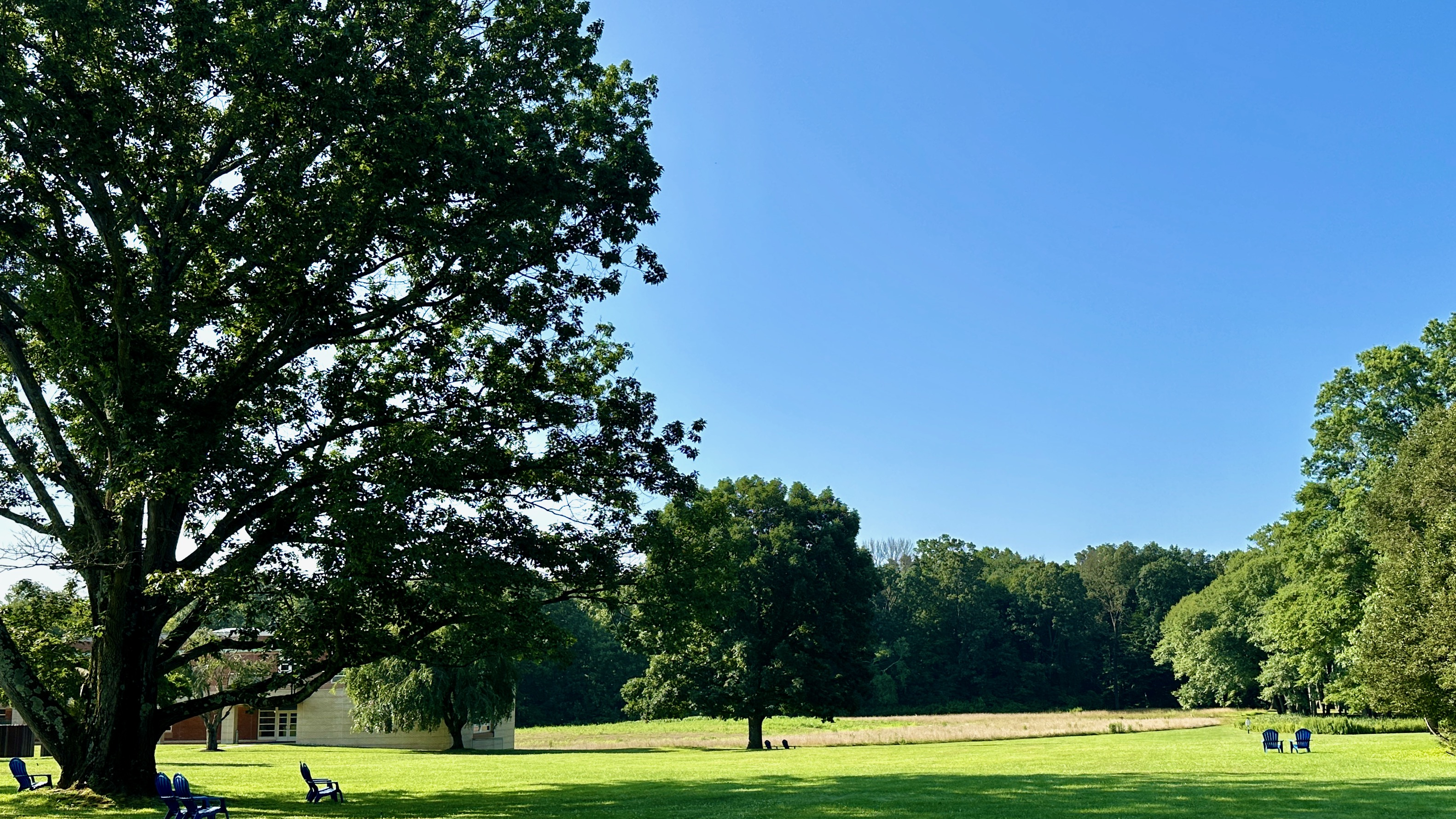
View of the Institute Woods from Fuld Hall

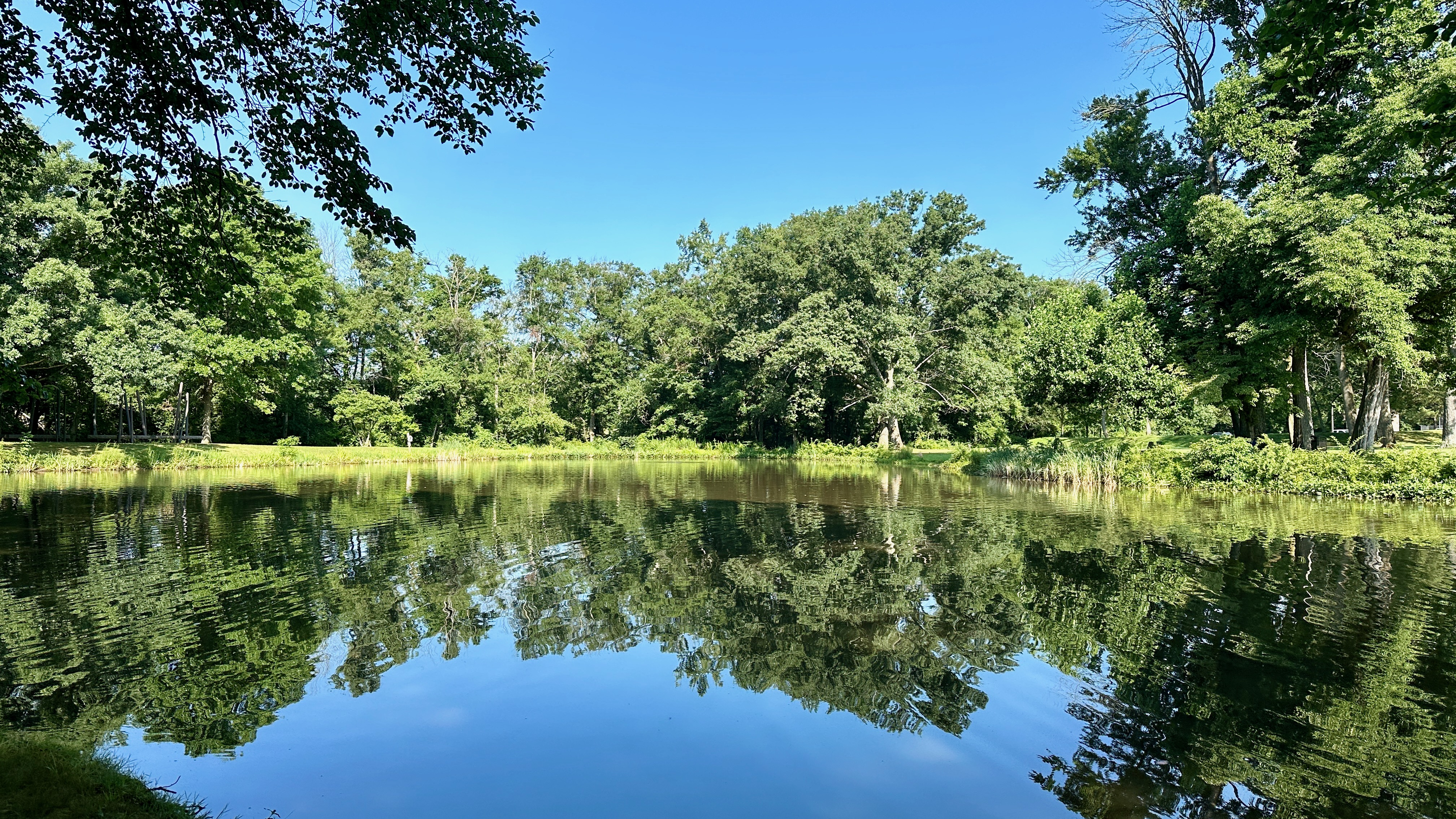
The Institute Pond, created in the 1960s

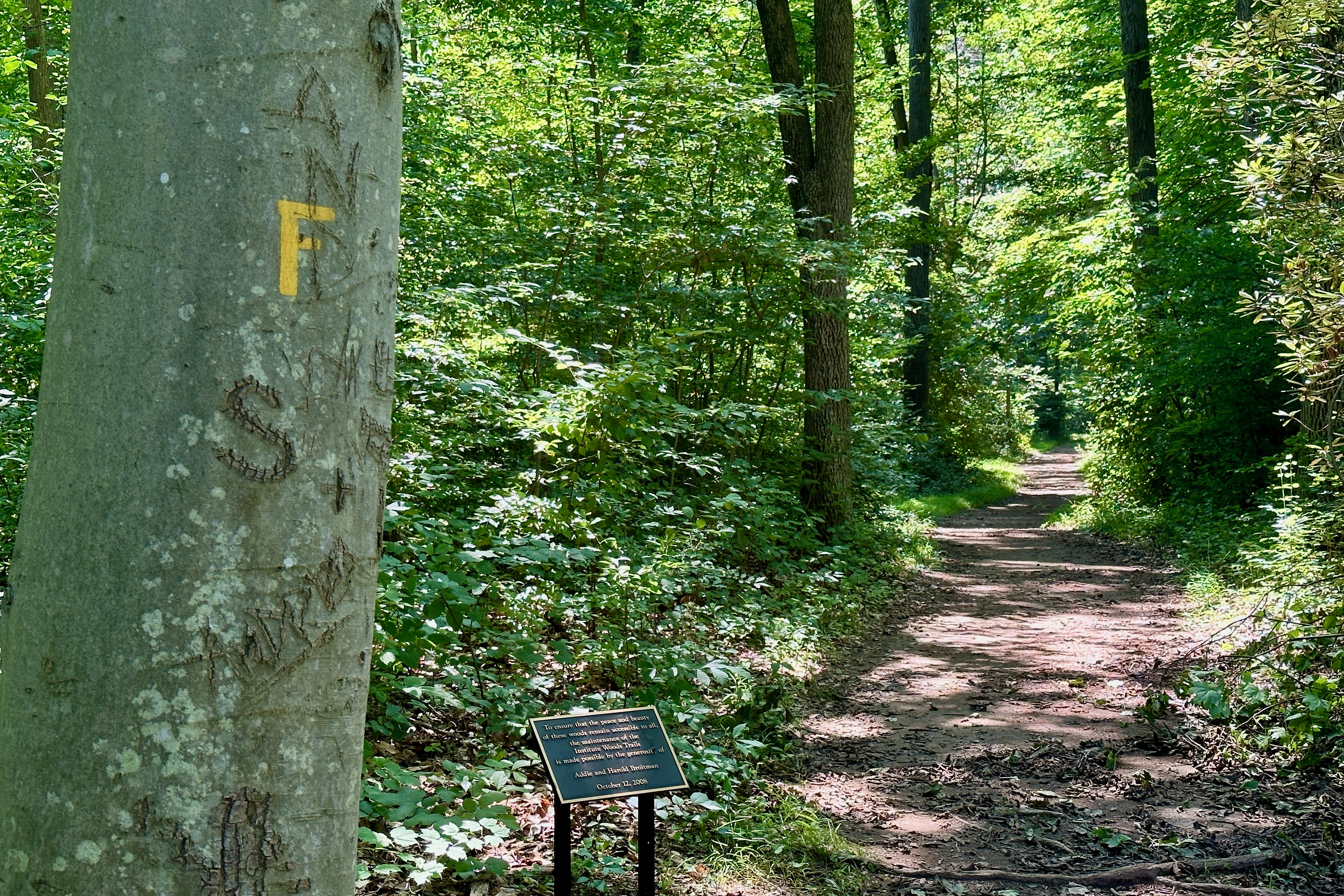
Founders' Walk in the Institute Woods

== See also ==
- List of Nobel laureates affiliated with the Institute for Advanced Study
- List of Fields medalists affiliated with the Institute for Advanced Study
- List of Cole Prize winners affiliated with the Institute for Advanced Study
- List of Wolf Prize winners affiliated with the Institute for Advanced Study
- Some Institutes for Advanced Study
- Economic and Financial Organization of the League of Nations, relocated at the IAS 1940–1946

== Bibliography ==
- Arntzenius, Linda G (2011). Institute for Advanced Study, pub by Arcadia, Charleston, SC. ISBN 978-0-7385-7409-7
- Axtell, James (2007). The Making of Princeton University : From Woodrow Wilson to the Present, Princeton University Press. ISBN 978-0-691-12686-9
- Batterson, Steve (2006). Pursuit of Genius : Flexner, Einstein, and the Early Faculty at the Institute for Advanced Study, A. K. Peters, Ltd., Wellesley, MA. ISBN 978-1-56881-259-5
- Bonner, Thomas Neville (2002). Iconoclast: Abraham Flexner and a Life in Learning, Johns Hopkins University Press. ISBN 978-0-8018-7124-5
- Dyson, George (2012). Turing's Cathedral: The Origins of the Digital Universe, Pantheon Books, New York. ISBN 978-0-375-42277-5
- Edwards, Jon R. (2012). A History of Early Computing at Princeton, Princeton Turing Centennial Celebration, Princeton University, May 10–12, 2012
- Feuer, Lewis Samuel (1974). Einstein and the Generations of Science, Basic Books. ISBN 978-0-465-01871-0
- Flexner, Abraham (1910). Medical Education in the United States and Canada: A Report to the Carnegie Foundation for the Advancement of Teaching, Merrymount Press. OCLC 9795002
- Flexner, Abraham (1930). Universities : American, English, German, Oxford Univ. Press, New York, OCLC 238820218
- Flexner, Abraham (1939). The Usefulness of Useless Knowledge, Harpers Magazine, Issue 179, June/November 1939
- Flexner, Abraham (1960). Abraham Flexner : An Autobiography, Simon and Schuster, New York. OCLC 14616573
- Freiberger, Marianne (2011). Review of Pursuit of Genius: Flexner, Einstein, and the Early Faculty at the Institute for Advanced Study, The Mathematical Intelligencer
- Frenkel, Edward (2015). Love and Math: The Heart of Hidden Reality, Basic Books, New York, ISBN 978-0-465-05074-1
- Grattan-Guinness, Ivor (2003). Companion Encyclopedia of the History and Philosophy of the Mathematical Sciences, volume 2, The Johns Hopkins University Press. ISBN 978-0-8018-7397-3
- Gunderman, Richard B.; Gascoine, Kelly; Hafferty, Frederic W.; Kanter, Steven L. (2010). A "paradise for scholars": Flexner and the Institute for Advanced Study, Academic Medicine : Journal of the Association of American Medical Colleges, November 2010; 85(11): 1784–9
- Institute for Advanced Study (1940). Bulletin No. 9 : History And Organization.
- Institute for Advanced Study (2010). "Modern Mathematics and the Langlands Program".
- Institute for Advanced Study (2013). "IAS Bluebook" (PDF).
- Institute for Advanced Study (2014). "Report for the Academic Year 2013–2014" (PDF).
- Institute for Advanced Study (2015). "Mission and History".
- Jogalekar, Ashutoshon (2013). Ich probiere: Revisiting Abraham Flexners dream of the useful pursuit of useless knowledge, Scientific American, December 12, 2013
- Leitch, Alexander (1978). The Institute for Advanced Study, in A Princeton Companion, Princeton University Press
- Leitch, Alexander (1995). Oswald Veblen, in A Princeton Companion, Princeton University Press
- Nasar, Sylvia (1998). A beautiful mind : a biography of John Forbes Nash, Jr., Simon & Schuster, New York, ISBN 978-0-684-81906-8
- Nevins, Michael (2010). Abraham Flexner: A Flawed American Icon, iUniverse Inc., ISBN 978-1-4502-6086-2
- Britta Padberg (2020). The Global Diversity of Institutes for Advanced Study, Sociologica, vol.14, no.1 (2020)
- Pais, Abraham & Crease, Robert P. J. Robert Oppenheimer: A Life, Oxford University Press, New York. ISBN 978-0-19-534722-7
- Pasachoff, Naomi (1992). Science's 'Intellectual Hotel' : The Institute for Advanced Study, Encyclopædia Britannica Yearbook of Science and the Future. ISBN 978-0-85229-549-6
- Regis, Ed (1987). Who Got Einstein's Office: Eccentricity and Genius at the Institute for Advanced Study, Addison-Wesley, Reading. ISBN 978-0-201-12065-3
- Reisz, Matthew (2008). The perfect brainstorm, Times Higher Education, March 20, 2008
- Scott, Joan Wallach & Keates, Debra, eds (2001). Schools of Thought : Twenty-five Years of Interpretive Social Science, Princeton University Press. A collection of reflective pieces by former fellows at the Institute for Advanced Study School for Social Science. ISBN 978-0-691-08841-9
- Villani, Cédric (2015). Birth of a Theorem : A Mathematical Adventure, Faber and Faber. ISBN 978-0-86547-767-4
- Wittrock, Björn (1910). A brief history of institutes for advanced study
