= Hutzler's =

Defunct department store founded in Baltimore, Maryland, US

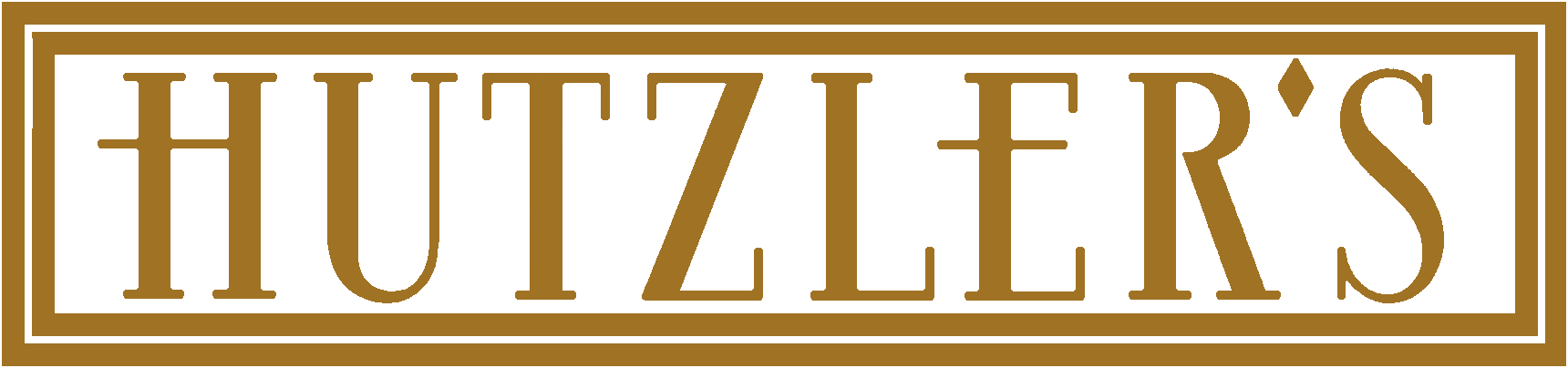
- Industry: Retail
- Founded: 1858
- Defunct: 1990
- Fate: Liquidation
- Headquarters: Baltimore, Maryland
- Key people: Abraham "Abram" Hutzler, founder
- Products: Fashion apparel, shoes, accessories, and cosmetics

Hutzler's, or Hutzler Brothers Company, was a department store founded in Baltimore by Abraham G. Hutzler (1836–1927) in 1858. From its beginning as a small dry goods store at the corner of Howard and Clay streets in downtown Baltimore, Hutzler's eventually grew into a chain of 10 department stores, all located in Maryland.

== Early years ==
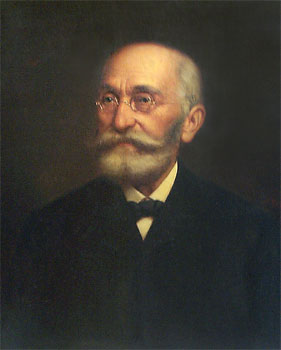
Moses Hutzler provided credit for his son, Abram, to start the company, but was otherwise not involved in the business

At age 23, Abram Hutzler was not yet old enough to secure credit; his father, Moses Hutzler, signed the official documents Abram needed to open the store in July 1858. Although the store originally traded as M. Hutzler & Son, Moses was otherwise not involved in the business.

After Abram brought his two brothers, Charles and David, into the business in 1867, the retail store was left in David's hands while Abram and Charles operated a wholesale business. The retail store expanded into three other storefronts on Howard Street in 1874, 1881 and 1887, gradually transforming into a department store. Abram and Charles discontinued the wholesale business in 1888 to concentrate on the company's retail operations.

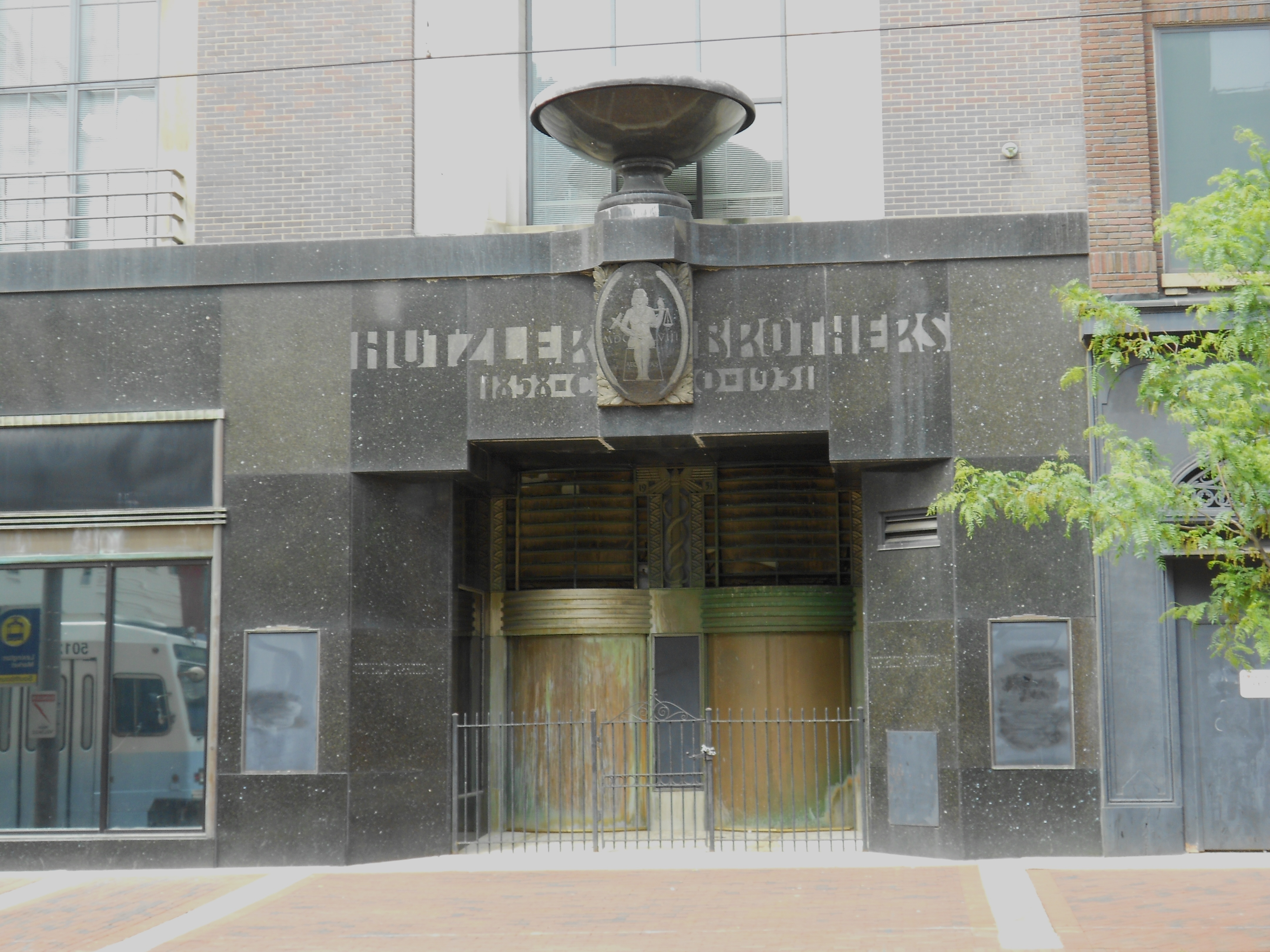
Entrance to the Hutzler Brothers Palace building at 200 North Howard Street in Baltimore (May 2012)

The original Howard Street locations were razed in 1888 and replaced by the five-story Hutzler Brothers Palace Building, designed by Baldwin & Pennington, an architectural firm. An example of neoclassical architecture, the Palace was added to the National Register of Historic Places in 1984. Its exterior features included Nova Scotia gray stone, carved with Arabesque heads and foliage, and large display windows. Facing Clay Street, a keystone carved with the image of Moses Hutzler was placed over a display window. The new store was organized into several departments and employed 200 workers.

In 1908, the company incorporated as Hutzler Brothers Company of Baltimore City. This was later amended to Hutzler Brothers Company.

Hutzler's opened its Colonial Tea Room on the fourth floor of the Palace building in 1917. It provided shoppers with a convenient dining location, the Tea Room also served as a venue for fashion shows.

=== Innovative retail practices ===
An innovator of progressive retailing practices, Hutzler's established the one-price policy in 1868. With one-pricing, all customers pay the same price, set by the store for a specific item, for specific period of time. This policy replaced the process of "higgling" or "haggling" to negotiate prices determined by the bargaining skill of individual customers. One-pricing for basic commodities was practiced before the Civil War, but Hutzler's may have been the first retailer to apply the policy to such a broad range of merchandise, including every item in the store.

Hutzler's led the retailing industry as one of the first to establish a liberal return policy, granting refunds to dissatisfied customers, and the first Maryland retailer with its own fleet of delivery trucks. It is also believed to be the first retail chain that did not discriminate against African-American customers. They operated the first bargain counter during the Civil War.

== Downtown expansion ==
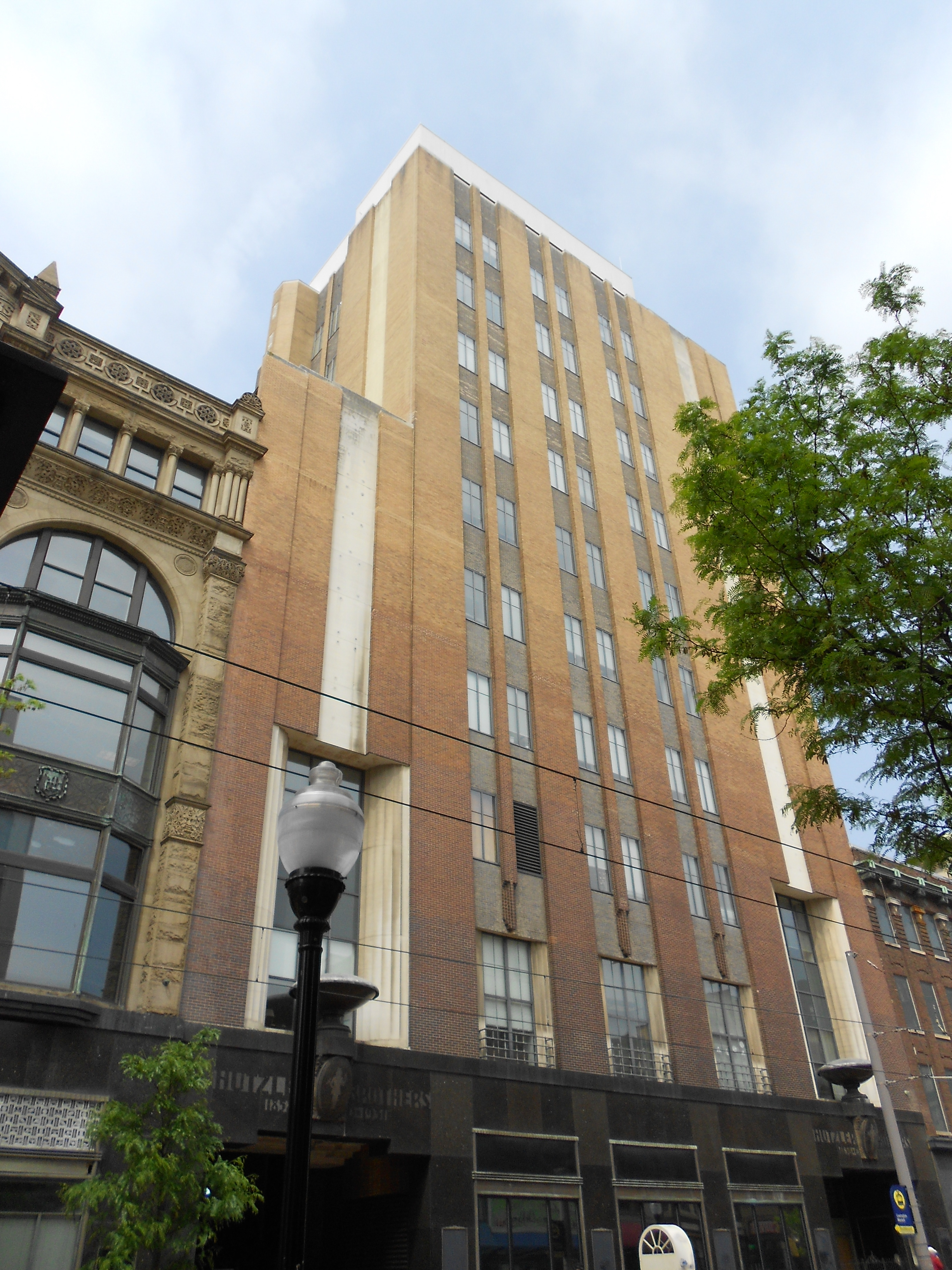
Hutzler Brothers "Tower" building, as seen from Howard Street, May 2012

A five-story building on Saratoga Street and two smaller buildings on Howard Street were added to the Hutzler's downtown location in 1916. Then in 1924 another five floors were added to the Saratoga Street building, bringing it up to 10 floors. Hutzler's Downstairs, an outlet for discounted merchandise, opened in the store's basement in September 1929.

A five-story art deco style expansion to the downtown store, described as "Greater Hutzlers", opened on October 1, 1932. This building eventually extended to nine floors and became known as the Tower building.

When it reached the peak of its operations in the 1950s, the downtown location covered 325,000 square feet (30,200 m^{2}) of retail space.

== Suburban expansion ==
In 1952, after nearly 100 years exclusively on the original site, Hutzler's opened its first branch store in Towson, Maryland. Other stores followed at Westview Mall, Eastpoint Mall, Southdale Center (this location was moved to Harundale Mall), Security Square Mall, Harford Mall, White Marsh Mall, and Salisbury Mall. In 1980, a small store in the Inner Harbor area was opened.

Designed for customers using automobiles, rather than pedestrian traffic, the Towson Hutzler's lacked the showcase windows of the downtown store. On the third floor of the Towson Hutzler's, customers dining in the store's Valley View Room, also known as the Tea Room, enjoyed a view overlooking the historic Hampton Mansion. The store restaurant had its own bakery, featuring Lady Baltimore cake and Goucher cake. Like the Tea Room in the Palace building downtown, the Valley View Room in the Towson Hutzler's also held fashion shows.

=== Declining years ===
In response to declining business in the 1980s, Hutzler's hired Angelo Arena from Marshall Field's in 1983 to take charge of the company and reverse the downward trend. In the fall of 1984, he moved the downtown store from its original location into the new Atrium building next door, site of Hochschild Kohn's former downtown location. The "Palace" name was also moved to the new building. By the time Arena arrived in 1983, the Hutzler's Palace store had contracted to 95,000 square feet (8,800 m^{2}) of retail floor space. Its new location in the Atrium building reduced Hutzler's to 70,000 square feet.

The move to the Atrium was part of a five-year plan, announced by Arena in August 1984, to buy four Hochshild Kohn's locations and to expand Hutzler's from eight to 15 stores in the Baltimore area.

Arena's efforts were unsuccessful. Hutzler's began closing stores, first with the Inner Harbor store in December 1986. The other locations followed until 1990, when all were gone.

Hutzler's remained a family-owned, Maryland business throughout its 132 years. Its downtown location is believed to hold the record among American department stores for the longest survival at an original location. David A. Hutzler, who joined the company's board in 1976, remained at his position until the company closed in 1990, without going through bankruptcy or lawsuits as its operations ended and assets were liquidated.

== Literature ==
- Michael Lisicky (2009). Hutzler's: Where Baltimore shops. The History Press, Charleston, SC. ISBN 978-1-59629-828-6.
- Baltimore's Bygone Department Stores: Many Happy Returns. The History Press. 2012. ISBN 978-1-60949-667-8.
- Suzanne Loudermilk and Kit Waskom Pollard (2019). Lost Restaurants of Baltimore. American Palate. ISBN 978-1-46714-066-9.

== See also ==
- Bargain bin
