= Salisbury Mall (Maryland) =

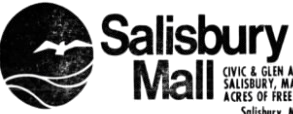
- Location: Salisbury, Maryland, United States
- Coordinates: 38.363°N 75.572°W
- Address: Civic and Glen Avenues
- Opened: October 16, 1968
- Closed: November 23, 2004
- Owner: Salisbury Mall Associates
- Num. of stores: 79 (at peak)
- Num. of anchor tenants: 4 (at peak)
- Floor area: 593,472 square feet (55,135.4 m^{2})
- Floors: 1
- Parking: Lighted parking lot with 3,300 spaces

The Salisbury Mall was a one-level 600,000-square-foot (56,000 m^{2}) regional mall located on Civic and Glen Avenues in Salisbury, Maryland. The Salisbury Mall was the first enclosed climate-controlled shopping mall in the Salisbury area, and the second on the Delmarva Peninsula. In the October 16, 1968 edition of the Daily Times in Salisbury, it was reported that the overall cost of the mall had exceeded $7 million, and the parking lot could accommodate 3,300 vehicles. The mall was originally anchored by Sears, Hecht's, Hutzler's, and Pantry Pride.

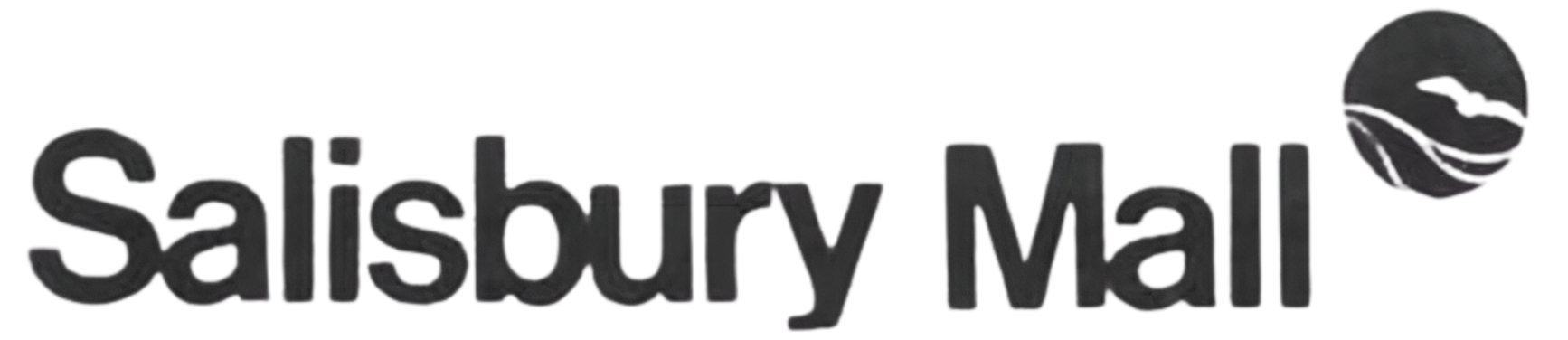
Another Variant of the Salisbury Mall's Logo

== Location ==
The mall's location near downtown Salisbury, along with the lack of other regional malls nearby, allowed the Salisbury Mall to thrive on the Eastern Shore of Maryland for more than two decades. The Salisbury Mall's closest regional mall competition was the Blue Hen Mall, which opened in 1968, and the Dover Mall, which opened in 1982, both located approximately 60 miles (97 km) north in Dover, Delaware.

Salisbury Mall's location on Civic and Glen Avenues was situated between a residential neighborhood and businesses along U.S. Route 50. The Wicomico Youth and Civic Center was within 100 yards (91 m) of the mall, and the city park and Salisbury Zoo were also within walking distance. In the years following the mall's opening, other major retailers clustered around the mall, including Towers Value House (later Service Merchandise) in 1977 and Toys "R" Us in 1983. The Salisbury Mall enjoyed a strong tourist customer base given its location on the major roadways of the Eastern Shore of Maryland and its close proximity to the popular tourist resort of Ocean City.

== History ==
=== Construction and opening ===
The mall project was officially announced in January 1967 by The Development Company of America. Construction on a 50-acre (20 ha) site near the civic center would begin later that year. A groundbreaking ceremony was held at the site on June 23, 1967, although construction didn't actually start until October.

The official grand opening took place one year later, during the week of October 14, 1968. Anchor stores Hecht Co. and Sears opened early in the week, followed by the mall itself on Wednesday. Although an opening-day advertisement for the mall claimed that shoppers could browse "all forty stores", only sixteen were ready to open on the first day of operation.

The mall claimed it would be "one of America's most beautiful shopping centers", and "an enchanting fantasyland of cascading fountains, lovely gardens, greenery, and flowers." The Salisbury Daily Times said the mall had "nine fountains and 25 planters" in its 530 feet (160 m) of interior walkways.

In a front-page article before opening day, the Daily Times highlighted a visit by then-reigning Miss America Judi Ford, and said "Before the day is over, hundreds—and perhaps thousands—of shoppers or sight-seers are expected to stroll the interior mall with its illuminated fountains and planters and new shops." A follow-up story stated mall owners were "delighted" with the crowds, and that police estimated a crowd of over 10,000 people during the peak evening hour.

Local sources speculated that the 10-acre (4.0 ha) Salisbury Mall would employ at least 1,000 workers when fully operational, with payroll between $5 and $6 million per year, and that annual sales could reach $15 million.

=== Renovation and expansion ===
On July 1, 1970, a single-screen movie theater opened at the mall. Originally operated by Cinecom Theatres and named simply "Mall Cinema," the theater featured the latest technology—xenon lamps, a "picture window radiant screen" and "RCA high fidelity sound"—for its 350 seats. It was Salisbury's first newly constructed movie theater since 1947. The theater was created by combining two vacant store spaces and pouring a new sloped concrete floor. A second screen would be added later, opening on May 19, 1977.

Eight years after its original opening, the Salisbury Mall underwent a major renovation and expansion, with construction beginning in November 1975. The mall opened a $3.5 million, 220,000-square-foot (20,000 m^{2}) east wing on September 13, 1976, which nearly doubled the mall's size to 593,472 square feet (55,135.4 m^{2}). The new wing added space for 25 new stores, bringing the mall's total capacity to 79. Two new anchors, Hutzler's and Pantry Pride, were also added, along with a Friendly's restaurant.

While the mall's original west section had a "colonial" look with columned entrances, the east section was of a more modern design. The entire building was made of white brick and stone. The mall's interior flooring, originally white ceramic tiles, was replaced with a parquet style during the renovation. After the addition, the mall's total number of parking spaces dropped slightly, to 2,880. With a central corridor connecting the original (west) wing to the new east wing, the mall was now laid out in an "H" shape when viewed from above.

The Hutzler's department store closed its doors in July 1987, after the struggling chain agreed to transfer the store's lease to Peebles, a Virginia-based regional department store chain. Peebles held a grand opening at the former Hutzler's space on August 20, 1987. The store chose to open almost immediately after Hutzler's departure, changing only the merchandise and signage. The space would then be gradually renovated the following year. Peebles already operated four stores on the Eastern Shore and wanted to expand into Salisbury, but this store would be the last major addition to the Salisbury Mall.

=== Competition and decline ===
In October 1988, a groundbreaking ceremony was held to mark the beginning of construction on a second enclosed mall in Salisbury. Phase one of the new mall, to be called The Centre at Salisbury, would include 693,842 square feet (64,460.0 m^{2}) of leasable space and four anchor stores including Boscov's, JCPenney, Leggett, and Montgomery Ward.

The Centre at Salisbury would attract more upscale establishments lacking at the Salisbury Mall, as well as more modern amenities, such as a food court and a multiplex theater. The mall would also have a much better location, as explained by Boscov's chairman Albert R. Boscov: "The Centre at Salisbury will be located at the intersection of Route 13, the principal north-south artery, and the Route 13 bypass, a limited access road that currently circumvents local congestion in Salisbury and provides full interchange connection at Route 50 for traffic heading to and from Ocean City. Without a doubt, the 'Centre' will have the best location in the entire area. The bypass extension to Route 50 west of Salisbury, planned for 1991, will further expand the accessibility of the mall to the majority of shore-bound traffic from Baltimore and Washington."

The Salisbury Mall owners had been considering an expansion to better compete with the soon-to-arrive Centre at Salisbury. However, those plans were shelved when it became clear that both Sears and Hecht's were planning to relocate to the new mall.

Hecht's had earlier agreed to stay and renovate their space at the Salisbury Mall, provided that Sears also agreed to stay. Sears, however, informed mall owners in September 1989 that they intended to relocate to the new Centre at Salisbury, thus freeing Hecht's from their agreement with the mall.

Both the Salisbury Mall's merchants and city officials were dissatisfied with the mall's management during this period, believing the mall should have been more aggressive trying to recruit and retain tenants. The mall still had an 85% occupancy rate, but many in the community believed most stores would soon flock to the new mall.

In a 1989 opinion column, the Daily Times lamented the possibility that the new mall would destroy the old Salisbury Mall. They wrote: "Instead of stimulating business for the old mall, the new mall appears destined to put the old mall out of business. The owners of the Salisbury Mall meanwhile, are spending most of their time discussing things like 'salvage value' [...] The Salisbury Mall's survival is as important to the community as the success of the new Centre at Salisbury. Free enterprise demands that only the strong survive, but it would be a tragedy to see the old mall fall into decline and take a part of the community with it."

On July 27, 1990, The Centre at Salisbury opened, located just 4 miles (6.4 km) north of the Salisbury Mall.

Hecht's and Sears relocated to the newly built mall in November 1991 as their leases expired, leaving Peebles and Food Depot as the only remaining anchors. Foot traffic decreased as national chains left the mall, due in part to concerns about crime and lax security. The twin-screen movie theater closed suddenly in May 1992, citing increased competition and declining business.

=== Homicide ===
On September 9, 1991, a seventeen-year-old Salisbury State University freshman student from Pittsburgh, Pennsylvania was murdered when she separated from a group of friends to use the restroom. When she exited the stall inside the ladies' room, she was confronted by David Boyd. He immediately stabbed her once in her chest and then spun her around and stabbed her once more in the back. Boyd then ran out of the restroom while the victim cried in pain. He then rode his bike to a nearby park where he fell asleep. He was arrested, convicted of murder, and sentenced to life in prison. Boyd continues to serve his sentence at the Maryland Correctional Institution - Hagerstown, located halfway between Salisbury and the victim's hometown of Pittsburgh.

=== Final years and west wing closure ===
In 1994, the mall made one final attempt at a recovery. By luring locally owned businesses and entrepreneurs with cheap rent, the owners hoped the mall could carve out a niche for itself. In September 1994, a "grand opening" was held to celebrate the arrival of many of these small businesses, most focusing on antiques or crafts. The mall held 51 stores at this point, although fewer than ten were national brands, and Orange Julius was the only remaining eatery. The mall's comeback didn't last; by 1996, the number of stores had dropped back down to 26, and rumors of the mall being sold and redeveloped were spreading.

The mall changed owners in 1997, purchased by Salisbury Mall Associates, LLC of Baltimore, Maryland. The new owners closed the original west wing of the mall in the spring of 1998 by erecting a plywood divider to block it off from the east wing. The western wing was allowed to quickly deteriorate. Because of the mall's flat roof, leaks were often a problem, and the original west wing was now going without basic upkeep and maintenance.

Peebles, Food Depot, and a few local stores were all that were left by the end of 1999. Most of the remaining tenants either relocated to nearby strip centers or simply went out of business. The nearby residents started complaining to the city of Salisbury because the structure was crumbling. Weeds had started to grow in the parking lot.

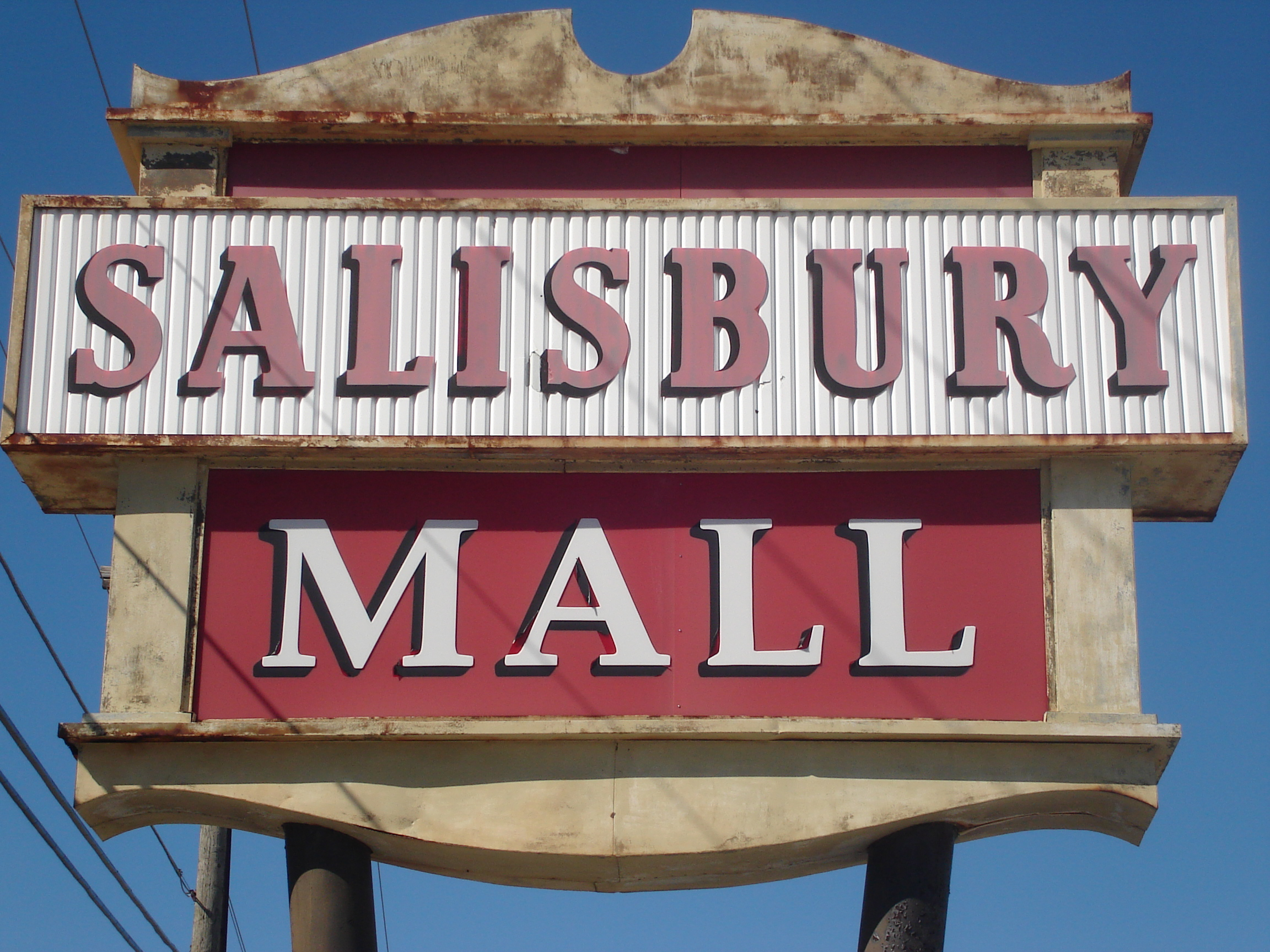
Salisbury Mall sign

The mall deteriorated rapidly; the original west wing caught fire due to an electrical short in 2000, and some parts of the building were condemned.

The last remaining department store, Peebles, closed its doors in the summer of 2001, citing poor sales. That left only Food Depot, The Connection, Illusion's Games and Comics, a branch of Sojourner-Douglass College, a martial arts academy, and a handful of small businesses.

The last remaining anchor—Food Depot—closed in December 2001, having been evicted after successfully suing the mall's owners over the poor maintenance of the building.

As of 2002, the mall had just seven remaining tenants and was placed up for sale.

The final tenant, The Connection, a locally owned clothing store, left the mall on November 23, 2004, relocating to The Twilley Center directly behind the mall.

=== Demolition and redevelopment attempts ===
A final 2007 Daily Times opinion piece on the old mall concludes: "It is now filled with mold, rotted by water damage and neglect, and unsafe for use or restoration. It's time to bid the Salisbury Mall farewell. It will soon be gone, and most of us would prefer to remember it as it once was, not as it stands today, an abandoned eyesore."

Demolition began on August 8, 2007, and was completed on November 21 of the same year. Cleanup occurred from December 2007 to April 2008: the remaining 40,000 tons of debris, consisting of the steel frame and masonry, was shipped to nearby recyclers.

Debate is ongoing between the property owners and the local community as to how the land should be used. The original redevelopment plan called for the land to be redeveloped as a mixed-use 685-unit residential/retail complex with a man-made lake, which would be known as The Village at Salisbury Lake. Construction was scheduled to begin in June 2008; however, these plans were put on hold due to the housing slump, and later the Great Recession that followed.

On November 12, 2007, the main building contractor, K. Hovnanian Homes of Maryland, LLC, filed suit against the property owner, Salisbury Mall Associates, LLC. The plaintiff was granted permission, by Wicomico County Circuit Court judge Donald C. Davis, to cancel their contract and pull out of the Village at Salisbury Lake development on September 29, 2008. On April 13, 2009, a stay of enforcement was granted to the defendant pending outcome of an appeal to the Maryland Court of Appeals. The defendant was required to post a $24,000 bond based on an estimated 18-month appeal period. The appeal was scheduled to be heard on February 3, 2010, as case number 2681/08. On July 6, 2011 the Court of Special Appeals vacated the judgement from the Wicomico County Circuit Court. The case was dismissed with prejudice.

Since April 2008, the mall site has remained empty except for piles of masonry reserved for future use. On July 10, 2019, the mall site was sold to Crossroads Salisbury, LLC for a residential and commercial development.

Another plan for the site's redevelopment was proposed in 2023. Still named The Village at Salisbury Lake, the updated plan called for 131 single-family homes and 88 townhomes on the property. However, funding for the project was still unclear as of 2024.
