= Dover Mall =

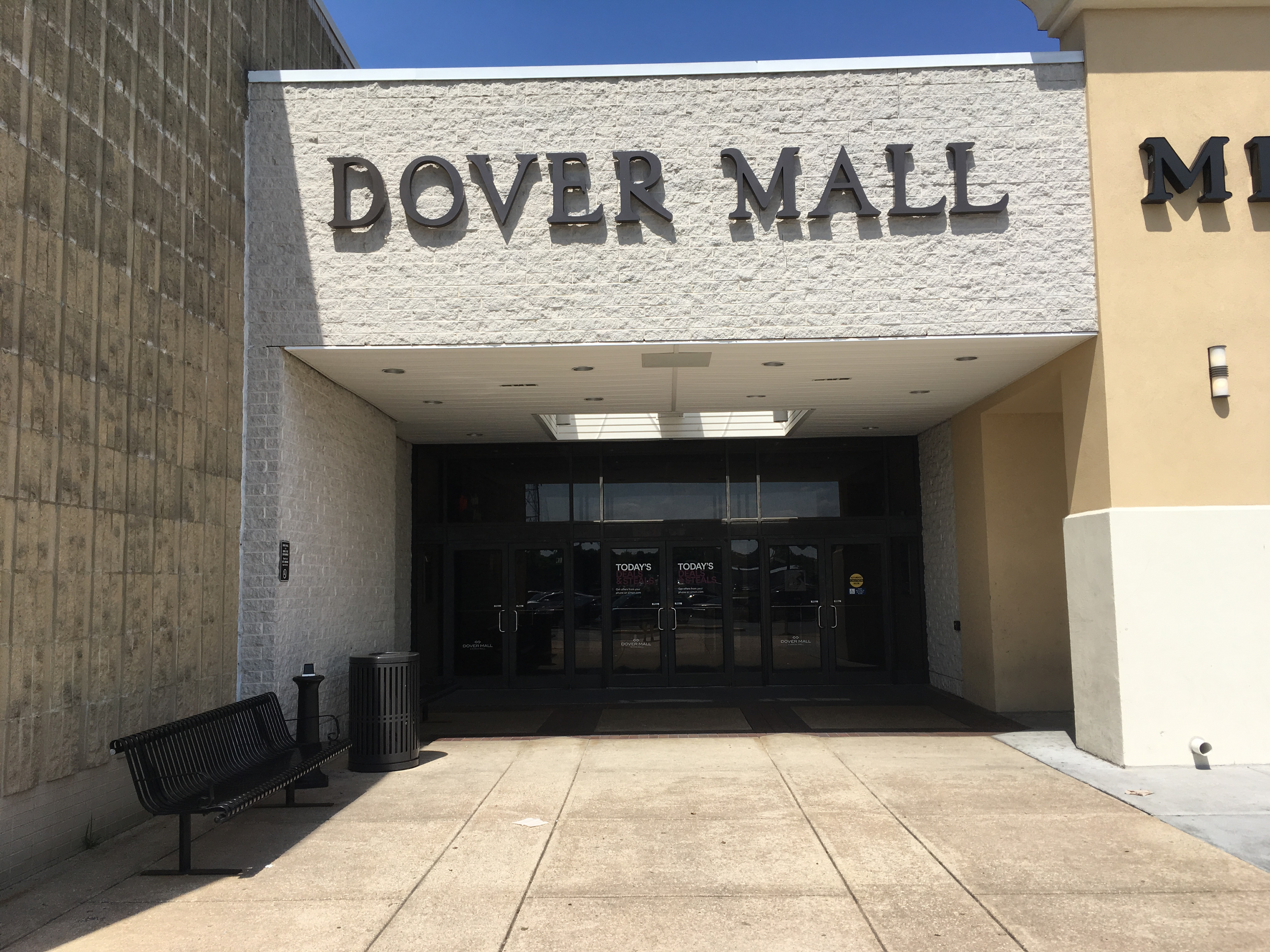
- Dover Mall entrance near Boscov's
- Location: Dover, Delaware, United States
- Coordinates: 39.1942°N 75.5398°W
- Address: 1365 North Dupont Highway Ste. 5061
- Opened: August 4, 1982; 44 years ago
- Renovated: 1993 (full mall); 1999 (food court)
- Developer: Homart Development Company
- Manager: Simon Property Group
- Owner: Simon Property Group (68.1%)
- Num. of stores: 54 (open)
- Num. of anchor tenants: 6 (4 open, 1 closing, 1 vacant)
- Floor area: 927,414 square feet (86,160 m^{2})
- Floors: 1 (plus mezzanine in Boscov's)
- Parking: Parking lot
- Public transit: DART First State bus: 108, 109, 112
- Website: www.simon.com/mall/dover-mall

Dover Mall is a shopping mall located on U.S. Route 13 in Dover, Delaware. The mall's anchor tenants include Boscov's, JCPenney, and Dick's Sporting Goods, along with Dover Movies 14. Old Navy serves as a junior anchor. It is a one-level, enclosed regional mall that is managed by majority-owner Simon Property Group. At 927,414 square feet (86,160 m^{2}), it is the second-largest mall in Delaware. There is one vacant anchor space last occupied by Macy’s. A second anchor space, currently occupied by Furniture & More, will be vacated by the end of 2026.

== Location ==
The mall is situated in a retail corridor and is located just northwest of Dover Motor Speedway and Bally's Dover casino resort, and across the street from Delaware State University. It is the only mall in Delaware located south of the Chesapeake & Delaware Canal. The mall is located a short distance south of an interchange with Delaware Route 1. The mall is served by DART First State bus routes 108, 109, and 112, which provide local bus service to points in Dover and Kent County. The closest competing malls are the Christiana Mall, 40 miles (64 km) north, and The Centre at Salisbury, 57 miles (92 km) south.

== History ==
=== 1980s ===
Dover Mall opened on August 4, 1982, and was developed by Homart Development Company. The mall became the second enclosed mall in Dover, following the 1968 opening of the Blue Hen Mall (now the Blue Hen Corporate Center). Dover Mall was built to provide a home for Sears and other interested retailers, after Sears was unable to reach an agreement to build a store at the Blue Hen Mall. The mall was originally anchored by Boscov's, Leggett, and Sears, and cost approximately $20 million to build. The Boscov's store in Dover was the chain's first location outside Pennsylvania and featured a full-service restaurant and candy counter.

The mall's original design featured raised brick planters throughout the mall and "walkways spanning a bubbling fountain" in the center court. There was also a fountain and stage in the Boscov's court. The 400-seat food court opened with several eateries including 1 Potato 2, The Great Hot Dog Experience, and Sbarro Pizza.

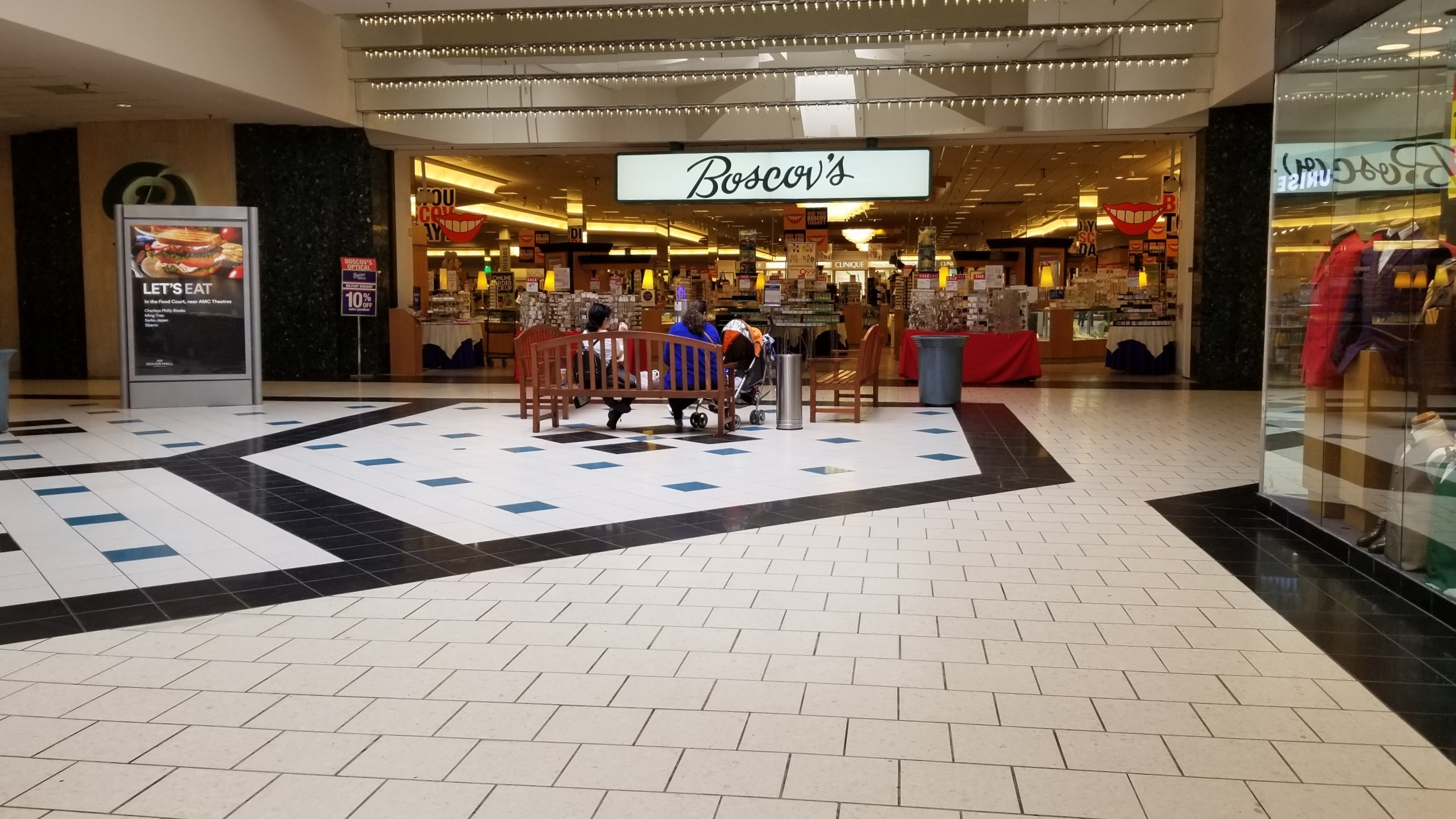
Boscov's entrance at Dover Mall, prior to 2025 store renovation

In December 1983, a six-screen movie theater opened at the mall, despite a lawsuit filed by the rival Blue Hen Mall. The theater was owned by Reading, PA-based Fox Theaters, which also owned the Dover Cinema at the Blue Hen Mall. The lawsuit had claimed that a 1979 lease agreement prohibited the theater operator from opening any new locations within a five-mile (8 km) radius of its mall.

In 1988, the mall's then-owners, Cadillac Fairview, built a new strip shopping center in front of the mall, parallel to the mall's south access road from U.S. Route 13. Named Dover Commons, the center added an additional 52,000 square feet (4,800 m^{2}) of retail space to the property. Silo and Pier 1 Imports became the center's anchor tenants.

=== 1990s ===
In September 1992, construction began on a 116,480-square-foot (10,821 m^{2}) addition onto the east side of the mall, to house a fourth anchor store. JCPenney opened on August 4, 1993, after relocating from the struggling Blue Hen Mall, four miles (6.4 km) south. The new location was 20,000 square feet (1,900 m^{2}) larger than the previous Dover store, in addition to presenting a "richer, more upscale appearance".

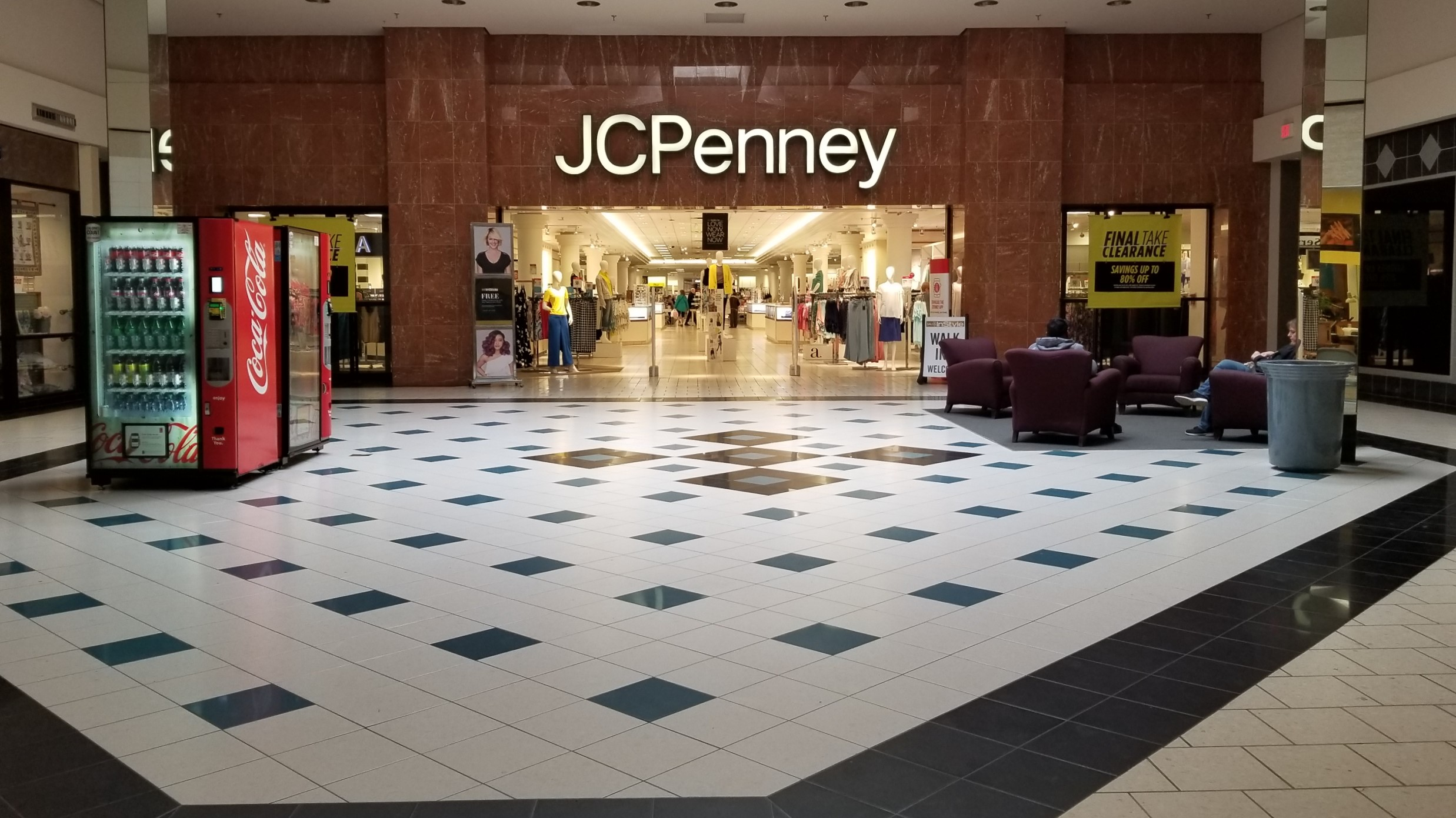
JCPenney entrance at the Dover Mall

In 1993, Dover Mall received its first renovation, removing the existing raised planters and fountains. A black and teal color scheme was introduced through new floor tiles and benches. Potted palm trees and additional skylights were also added. At the time of renovation, the mall held 95 stores and a 96.5% occupancy rate.

In October 1993, the Dover Mall became the second shopping mall in the state to ban smoking indoors, after a survey of 500 shoppers showed that nearly 80% were in favor of the ban.

In 1995, the Silo store at Dover Commons closed due to the chain's sudden collapse. It was replaced by a Chuck E. Cheese restaurant and arcade.

In March 1997, Leggett closed its location at the mall after the chain was purchased by Belk. Two months later, the May Company announced it would open a Strawbridge's department store in the vacant space. The existing Leggett building would be completely gutted, expanded by 65,265 square feet (6,063.3 m^{2}), and given an entirely new facade.

However, Boscov's objected to the size of the proposed Strawbridge's and sued in Chancery Court to block its construction. Boscov's cited a prior agreement with the mall's owner, which prohibited any expansion project unless permission was granted by the other anchor stores. Following two months of negotiations, Boscov's reached an agreement with May that allowed construction to proceed on Strawbridge's, while also allowing a simultaneous expansion of the Boscov's store.

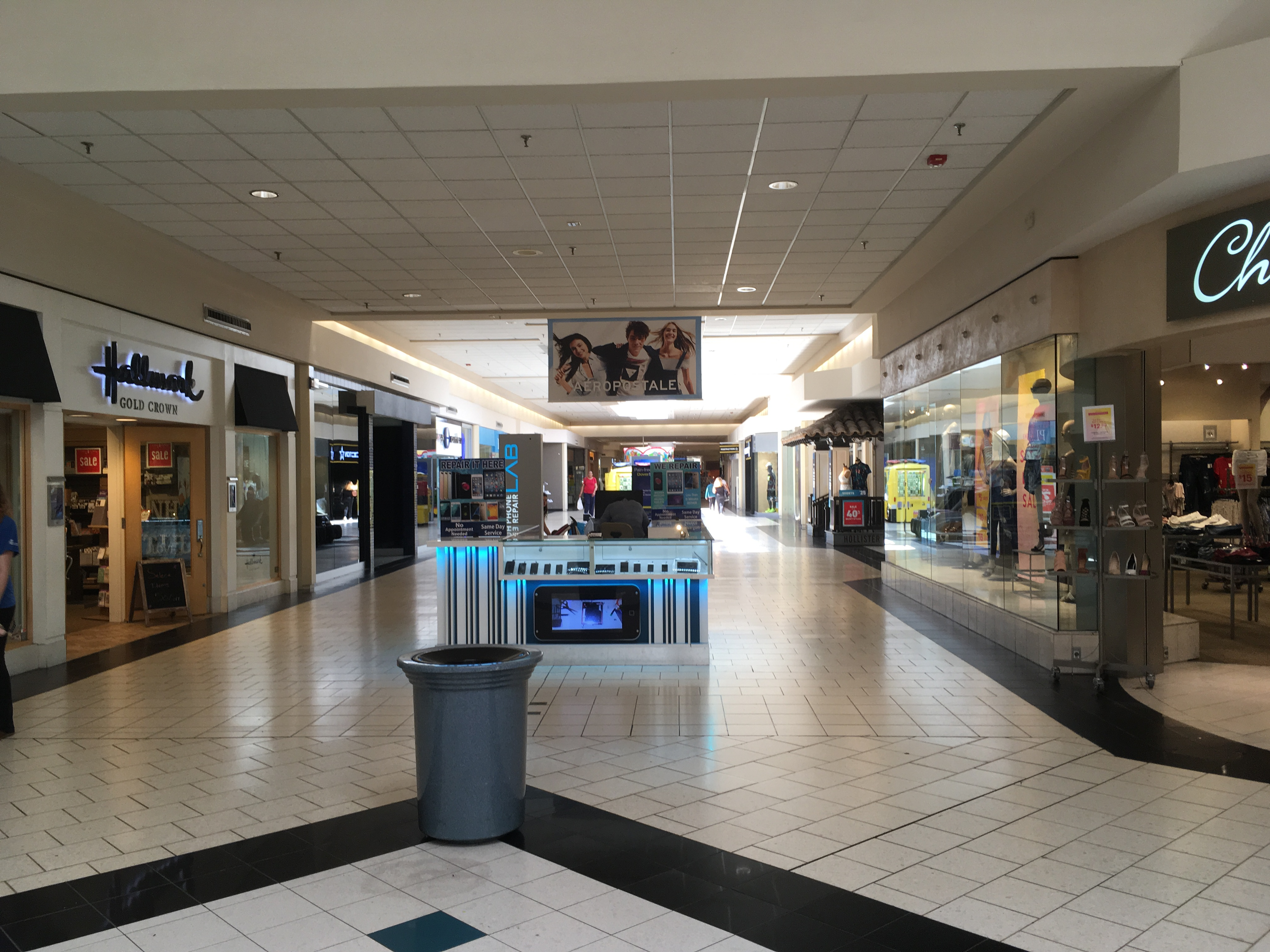
Dover Mall looking north from Center Court (2018)

Strawbridge's opened in November 1997, after just five months of construction. Meanwhile, Boscov's underwent a multimillion-dollar renovation and 60,000-square-foot (5,600 m^{2}) expansion project, which was completed the same month.

During the same time period, Sears completed a $3.4 million interior renovation.

In 1996, Fox Theatres was taken over by Carmike Cinemas. In 1999, the theater was expanded from six screens to fourteen at a cost of nearly $4 million, with the addition of stadium seating and digital surround sound. The building was expanded by 42,000 square feet (3,900 m^{2}) to accommodate the eight new auditoriums. The theater also received a new lobby and mall entrance from the food court, replacing its previous entrance near Boscov's.

While the theater was under construction, the mall's food court and restrooms underwent a $1.5 million renovation and expansion. To create a larger seating area, three existing retail spaces were reduced in size. The expansion added 200 seats and three new restaurants.

=== 2000s ===
Old Navy opened a 21,000-square-foot (2,000 m^{2}) store in the fall of 2000, filling space vacated by Lerner, Express, and Structure.

Macy's entrance at Dover Mall (2019)

In 2003, The Mills Corporation acquired the mall from Cadillac Fairview. The Mills Corporation intended to add approximately 500,000 square feet (46,000 m^{2}) of new stores and entertainment venues to the property, including an ice rink and skate park. However, these plans never advanced beyond the early planning stage.

In September 2006, Strawbridge's was converted to Macy's after Federated Department Stores purchased May Department Stores.

In 2007, Simon Property Group acquired the mall along with the other Mills properties, becoming the mall's third owner since 2000. It is Simon's only Delaware property.

In 2008, the mall's Ruby Tuesday restaurant closed after 15 years in business, leaving the Boscov's restaurant as the mall's only sit-down dining option.

In 2009, JCPenney completed a comprehensive interior renovation of its Dover Mall location.

=== 2010s ===
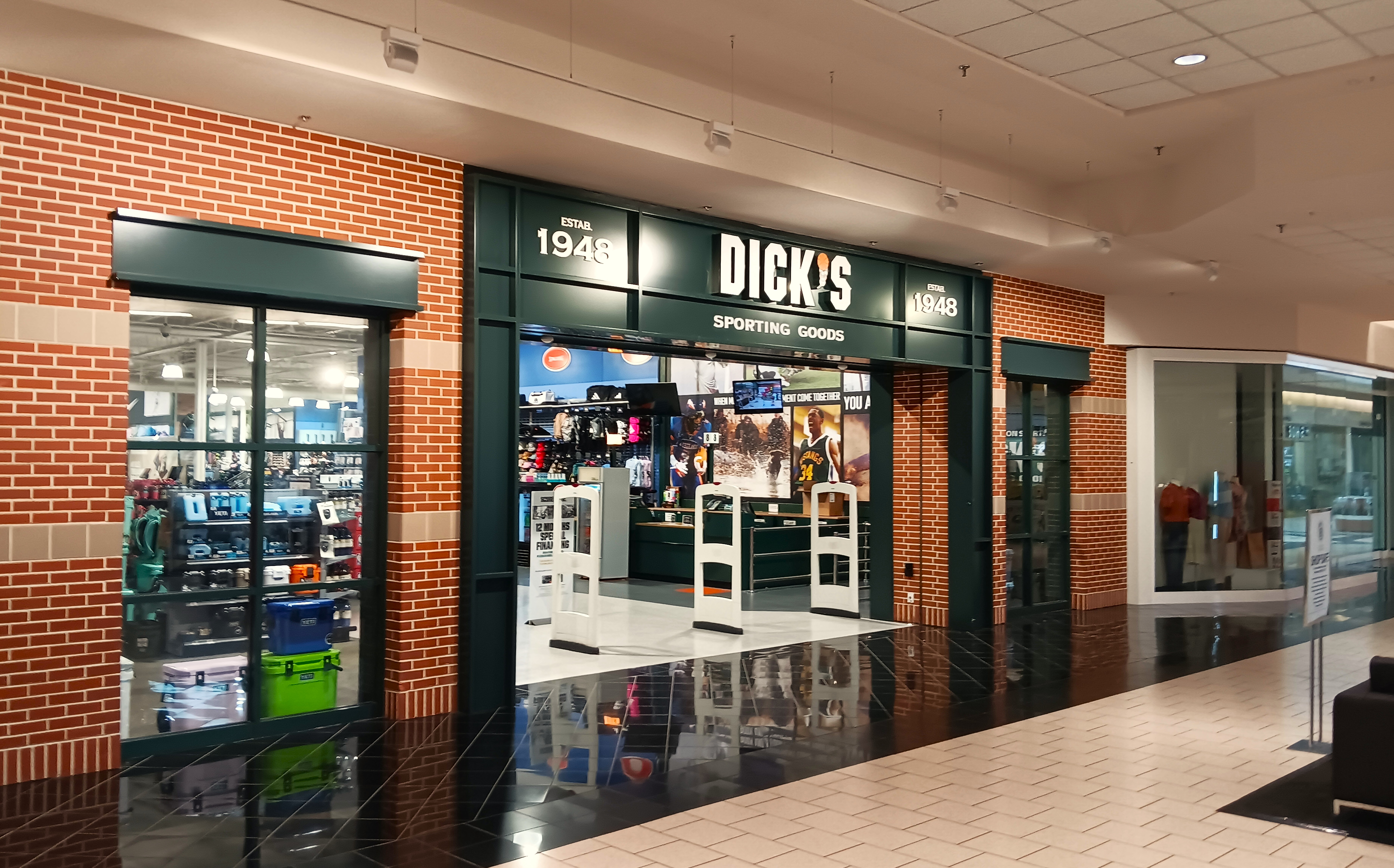
Interior entrance to Dick's Sporting Goods at Dover Mall

In November 2013, Dick's Sporting Goods opened as the mall's sixth anchor. To create the store, a 53,183-square-foot (4,941 m^{2}) addition was constructed on the southwest side of the building. The addition required permanently removing one mall entrance, along with an attached side corridor and the former Ruby Tuesday space. Several other stores were added at the same time, including Forever 21 as a junior anchor.

In 2017, the movie theater was rebranded to AMC Classic Dover 14 after Carmike Cinemas was purchased by AMC.

Also in 2017, Simon proposed building a retail power center behind the mall, which would house numerous big-box stores and restaurants. Under the proposal, the mall would receive a dedicated highway exit from nearby Route 1. These plans eventually fell through due to high construction costs and the mall's increasing struggles.

In May 2018, Sears Holdings announced that the Sears location at Dover Mall would be closing as part of a plan to close 42 stores nationwide. Liquidation sales began on May 18, 2018 and the store closed in August 2018. The Sears Auto Center closed by the end of 2018.

In 2019, a children's play area was added to the former Sears court.

=== 2020s ===
In early 2020, Pier 1 Imports in Dover Commons closed due to the chain's bankruptcy. It was replaced by a Boot Barn in 2022.

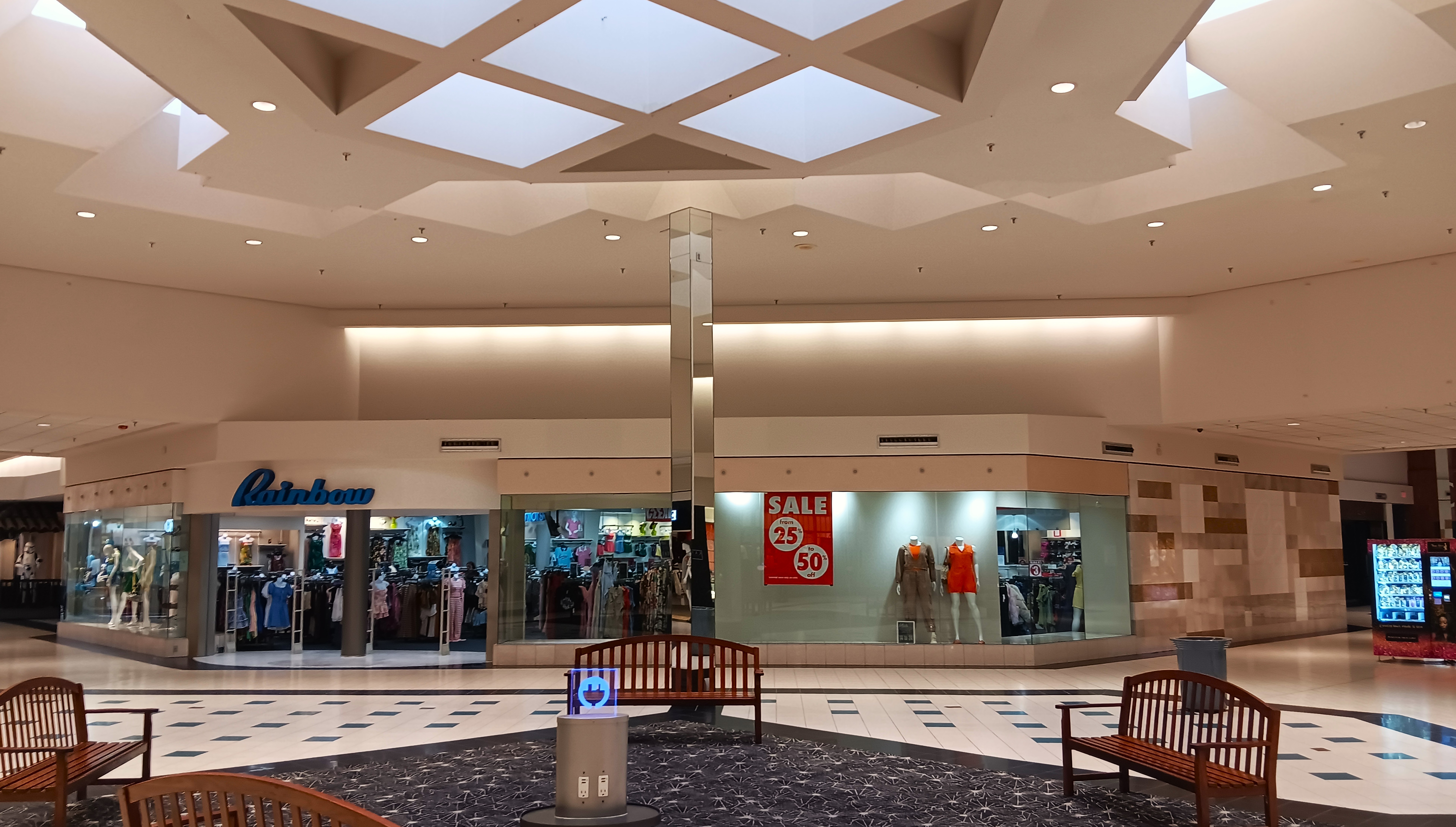
The mall's Center Court in 2026

In October 2020, Macy's announced that the mall's Macy's store would be converted into a fulfillment center as online shopping spiked during the COVID-19 pandemic. The Macy’s fulfillment center closed at the end of 2023, leaving an empty anchor space.

In early 2021, amid the ongoing pandemic, Boscov's closed their six remaining full-service restaurants, including the Dover Mall location.

In July 2021, the Dover city council amended the mall's zoning, allowing distribution centers, warehouses, and logistics businesses to operate at the mall. At the time, city planning director Dave Hugg stated, "It's very unlikely that the Dover Mall will continue to function viably as a regional shopping center without being able to likewise take advantage of [...] new opportunities."

In 2022, Walmart opened a truck driving school at the mall, as part of an "Associate-to-Driver" pilot initiative. The program offers employees from Walmart stores and distribution centers the opportunity to earn a commercial driver's license (CDL) upon completion of a 12-week course. Graduates then become full-time, salaried drivers for Walmart. Trucks used by the program are stored in the mall's parking lot.

In March 2024, the mall's AMC theater permanently closed, leaving Dover without a movie theater. The theater had faced increasing competition from newer multiplexes, especially Westown Movies in Middletown, which opened in 2013, and Milford Movies 9 in Milford, which opened at the end of 2020. AMC was also experiencing chain-wide financial difficulties during this period.

In May 2024, Furniture & More opened in the former Sears location at the mall. The regional furniture chain consolidated its two previous Dover locations into a new store at the mall.

In March 2025, Forever 21 announced it would be closing all of its remaining U.S. stores due to a Chapter 11 Bankruptcy filing. The store was quickly replaced by regional clothing chain Portabella, which then closed in October 2026. The space is currently vacant.

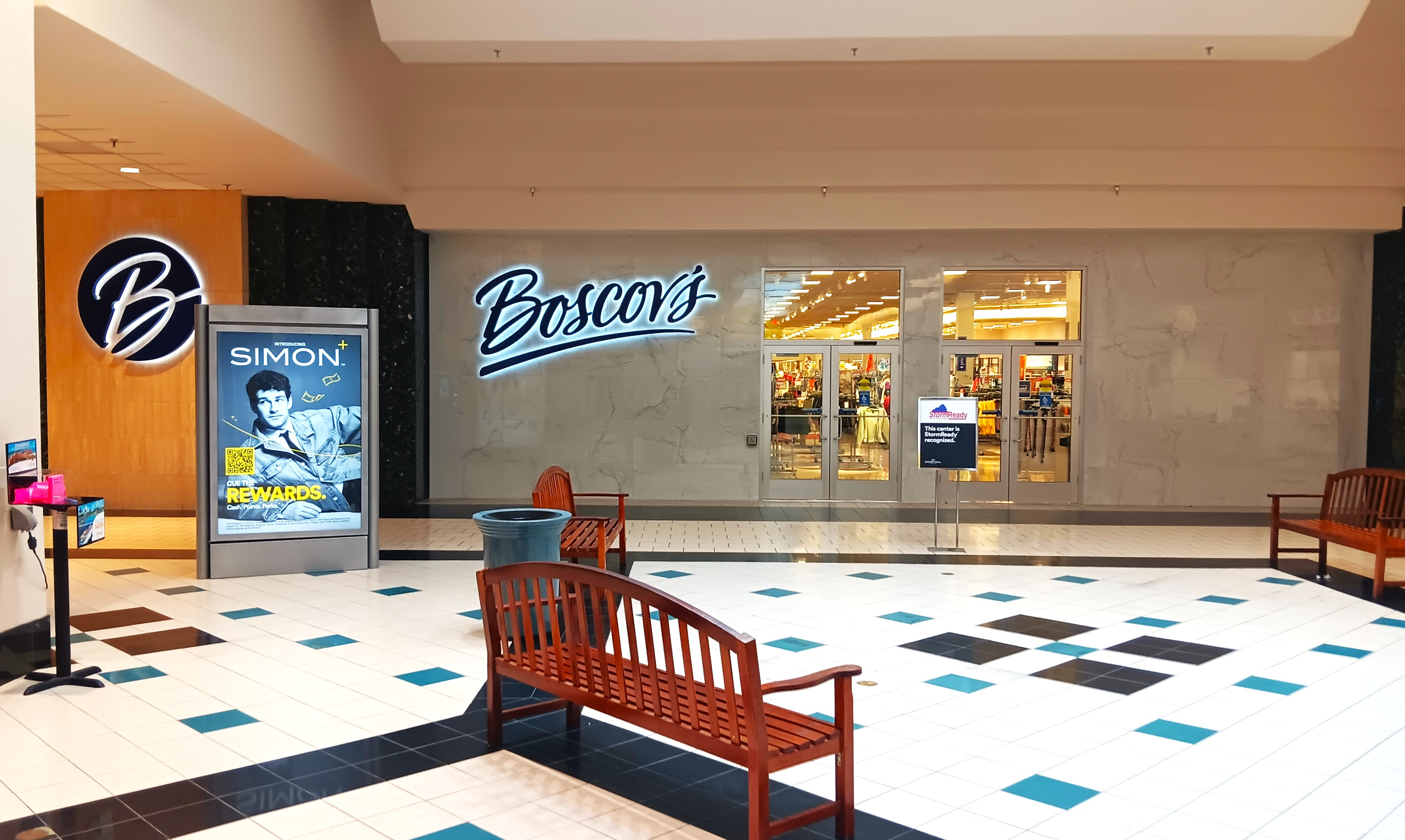
Boscov's after 2025-2026 store renovation

Boscov's underwent a major interior renovation in 2025, which modernized the store and removed its original chandeliers and neon lighting. The Boscov's mall entrance also received a new look, with updated signage and two sets of double doors replacing the original, larger opening. This is part of a broader effort by Boscov's to remodel around two stores annually. Jim Boscov, the chain's current CEO, says the updates "resize departments to reflect their importance in today's world", along with adding self-checkout and improved lighting.

In May 2026, local entrepreneur Arthur Helmick announced plans to reopen the mall's movie theater. Dover Movies 14 opened in November 2026, filling the space previously vacated by AMC, but fully renovated to modern standards. Helmick, who also owns the competing theaters in Middletown and Milford, explained "We put good money into this local theater and it’s going to be a completely new experience. I know everyone was unhappy with how AMC was running things..." The new theater features several amenities new to Dover, including laser projection, heated recliner seats, and self-serve concessions.

The reopening of the theater is part of a recent focus by the mall to recruit more local operators and entertainment-focused tenants, such as the Go Playland children's attraction, Jump Zone, and HobbyNexus.

Furniture & More will close its anchor store at the Dover Mall by the end of 2026, citing a "heavily competitive market for the middle-level customer".

As of mid-2026, the Dover Mall contains a total of 54 retail tenants, including 7 counter-service restaurants.
