= Shore Transit =

Transit agency in Maryland

- Parent: Tri-County Council for the Lower Eastern Shore of Maryland
- Founded: July 2003
- Headquarters: 31901 Tri-County Way; Salisbury, MD
- Service area: Somerset, Wicomico, and Worcester counties in Maryland
- Service type: bus service
- Routes: 11
- Stops: 200+
- Fleet: 46 vehicles
- Annual ridership: 365,558 (FY 2017)
- Transit Director: Andrew Wile
- Website: shoretransit.org

Shore Transit is a public transit agency that provides commuter bus service on the Lower Eastern Shore of the state of Maryland in the United States, serving Somerset, Wicomico, and Worcester counties. A major transfer point is located in Salisbury, Maryland, where most of the buses gather thirty minutes after every hour.

== History ==
In October 2002, the Tri-County Council for the Lower Eastern Shore was approached by representatives from Somerset Commuter, Wicomico Transit, and Worcester County Ride, with the desire to merge the three public transit systems. In July 2003, Wicomico Transit and Somerset Commuter merged to form Shore Transit, with Worcester County Ride joining in July 2004.

Shore Transit continues to expand to this day. As a part of the American Recovery and Reinvestment Act of 2009, Shore Transit received funding for eight new buses and a new building for its headquarters, which was located near Wor-Wic Community College, as part of the Tri-County Council building.

== Services ==
Shore Transit has twelve bus lines through the three counties with over 200 bus stops. The routes are mainly on the major highways in the region: U.S. Route 13, U.S. Route 50, and U.S. Route 113. Shore Transit also has several transfer points or hubs to connect to other buses, either more of its services or to other transit agencies.

Calvert Street
In downtown Salisbury. All but one bus routes stop here at one point during the day, most of which meet thirty minutes after every hour. The Calvert Street hub also provides connections to Delmarva Community Transit, another commuter transit agency serving Dorchester County and is a partner of MUST, a collaborative group of public transit agencies on Maryland's Eastern Shore.

Ocean City Transfer Point
Serves as a transfer point for Ocean City Transportation's Coastal Highway Beach Bus and Shore Transit during the winter months. Served by Routes 432 and 452.

West Ocean City Park and Ride
Serves as a transfer point for Ocean City Transportation's West Ocean City Park-N-Ride Beach Bus and Shore Transit during the summer months. Served by Routes 432 and 452.

Princess Anne Transfer Point
Located at Somerset Plaza. Routes 432, 452, 706 North and 706 South serve this hub, and the buses usually gather on the hour.

Westover Park and Ride
Serves as a transfer point and is served by Routes 432, 452, 706 North and 706 South.

=== Routes ===
Route Number	Route Name	Notable stops	Cities served	Other notes
Route 102	Downtown Salisbury Trolley	Salisbury University, University Terrace, and University Orchard to Downtown Salisbury.	Salisbury	In Service Thursday through Saturday ONLY
Route 115	Salisbury & Delmar	Wor-Wic Community College, Calvert St., The Centre at Salisbury, Target, Jasmine Dr., Walmart-Salisbury, and Rite Aid - Delmar.	Salisbury; Delmar	
Route 120	Delmar-Fruitland	Delmar Rite Aid, Target, Walmart North, The Centre at Salisbury, Calvert St., Magg's Gym, Walmart Fruitland and Pat's Pizzeria	Delmar Salisbury	
Route 155	South & East Salisbury	This route travels throughout the South side and East side of Salisbury. Notable stops include Food Lion - Fruitland, Walmart - Fruitland, Milford St. Medical Center, Schumaker Place, Health South, K-Mart, Walgreens, and Calvert St.	Salisbury; Fruitland	
Route 199	West & North Salisbury	This route serves both West and North Salisbury. Notable stops include Calvert St., Pine Bluff Village, Lodges at Naylor Mill, Foxfield Apts., Walmart - Salisbury, Target, and The Centre at Salisbury.	Salisbury	
Route 253	Salisbury–Princess Anne–Pocomoke	Shore Transit Terminal, Wor-Wic Community College, Walmart-Fruitland, UMES, Somerset Plaza, Walmart-Pocomoke	Salisbury; Fruitland; Princess Anne; Pocomoke	
Route 432	Salisbury-Ocean City-Pocomoke	Shore Transit Terminal, Ocean City, Berlin, Snow Hill, Pocomoke and Princess Anne	Salisbury Ocean City Berlin Snow Hill Princess Anne	
Route 452	Salisbury-Pocomoke–Ocean City	This route travels south to Princess Anne, then onward to Pocomoke. From there, it travels to Snow Hill, Berlin, and Ocean City, before returning to Salisbury.	Pocomoke; Berlin; Ocean City	
Route 706N	Salisbury–Crisfield–Princess Anne	Princess Anne Transfer Point, Kings Creek Market, Crisfield High School and Somers Cove.	Salisbury; Princess Anne; Crisfield	
Route 706S	Princess Anne–Crisfield	Princess Anne Transfer Point, Kings Creek Market, Crisfield High School and Somers Cove.	Princess Anne; Crisfield	

=== Shore Ride & Shore Access ===
Shore Transit also offers a service to those who are not located close to the fixed routes. The service only allows those whose destinations are outside of a .75 miles (1.21 km) distance of a fixed route stop to use it, and the requests for use must be called in. Additionally, it provides ADA transportation to disabled customers.

=== Fares ===
Fares one-way on any bus currently cost $3.00 and there are transfer tickets that cost $1.00. Senior fares are applicable for those over 62, and they are $1.50 one way. Children under 42 inches (110 cm) ride free.

In July 2008, a seven-day pass was introduced for all riders. This pass is refillable over seven-day periods and can be filled for up to four weeks at a time; each seven-day period costs $25.00.
