= Blue Hen Mall =

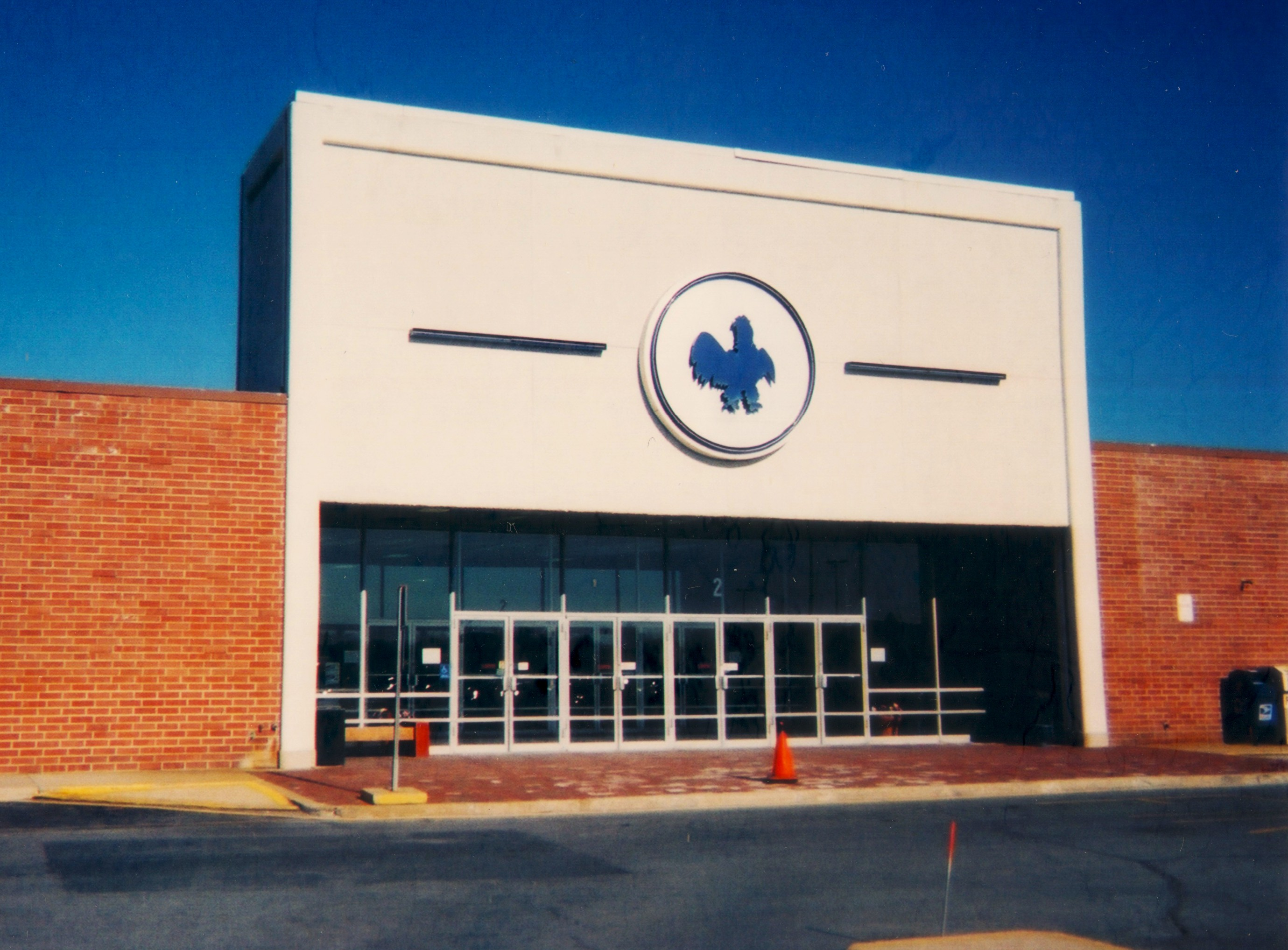
- Main entrance, mid-1990s
- Location: Dover, Delaware, United States
- Coordinates: 39.152°N 75.502°W
- Address: 655 S. Bay Rd., Dover, DE 19901
- Opened: August 15, 1968; 58 years ago (Original indoor mall)
- Closed: 1995 (original indoor mall)
- Developer: Jardel Co. Inc.
- Owner: Bayhealth Medical Center
- Floor area: 479,533 square feet (44,550.1 m^{2})
- Floors: 1 (retail level); 2 (JCPenney and office level)
- Parking: Parking lot with 6,000 spaces
- Public transit: DART First State bus: 107
- Website: https://www.bayhealth.org/locations

The Blue Hen Mall (now the Blue Hen Corporate Center) is a defunct shopping mall on Bay Road in Dover, Delaware. The mall opened in August 1968, and was developed and owned by the Jardel Company. It was named after Delaware’s official state bird, the blue hen chicken, and was the only enclosed mall serving the Dover area until the opening of the Dover Mall in 1982. After losing all of its anchor stores in the early 1990s, the mall was converted into a corporate center. The former mall is now owned by Bayhealth Medical Center and contains various medical facilities, along with a mix of state and federal offices. In addition to Bayhealth offices and outpatient clinics, tenants include the State of Delaware, the U.S. Social Security Administration, and an outpatient clinic operated by the U.S. Department of Veterans Affairs. The building was constructed with a gross leasable area of 479,533 square feet (44,550.1 m^{2}) and 6,000 parking spaces.

== History and design ==
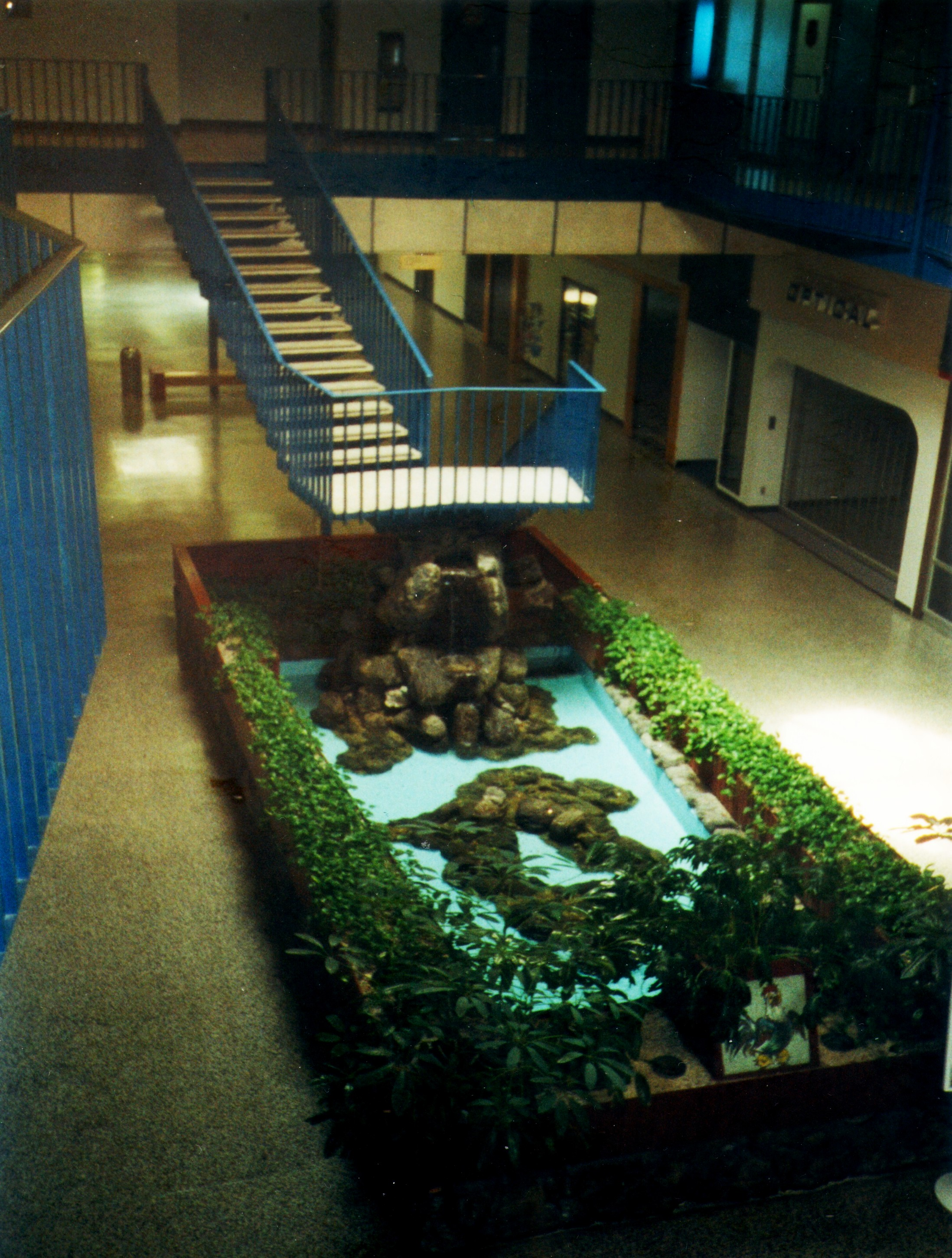
Blue Hen Mall staircase and waterfall, viewed from second floor

Construction on the Blue Hen Mall began in September 1966, at an expected cost of $5 million. The mall opened two years later in the summer of 1968, becoming the first enclosed mall in Delaware. The opening of the center contributed to the flight of businesses away from historic downtown Dover.

JCPenney served as the new mall’s lead anchor, after relocating from a downtown location on Loockerman Street. Other original anchors included Woolco and Woolworth, as well as a movie theater. The mall had space for approximately 50 shops and restaurants. Popular early stores included Hess Apparel, Benjamins, Dannemann's Fabrics, Thom McAn, Thrift Drug, and Record Museum (later Sound Odyssey). Restaurants included The Torch House and China Garden.

The mall was laid out in a classic "dumbbell" shape, with JCPenney anchoring the north end and Woolco on the south end. Woolworth and Dover Cinema occupied the largest inline spaces near the center of the mall. Russell Stover Candies (later Jerry's Dairy Bar and Walt's Dairy Bar), Bavarian Pretzel, and Woolworth's Harvest House Restaurant formed a cluster of eateries adjacent to the cinema.

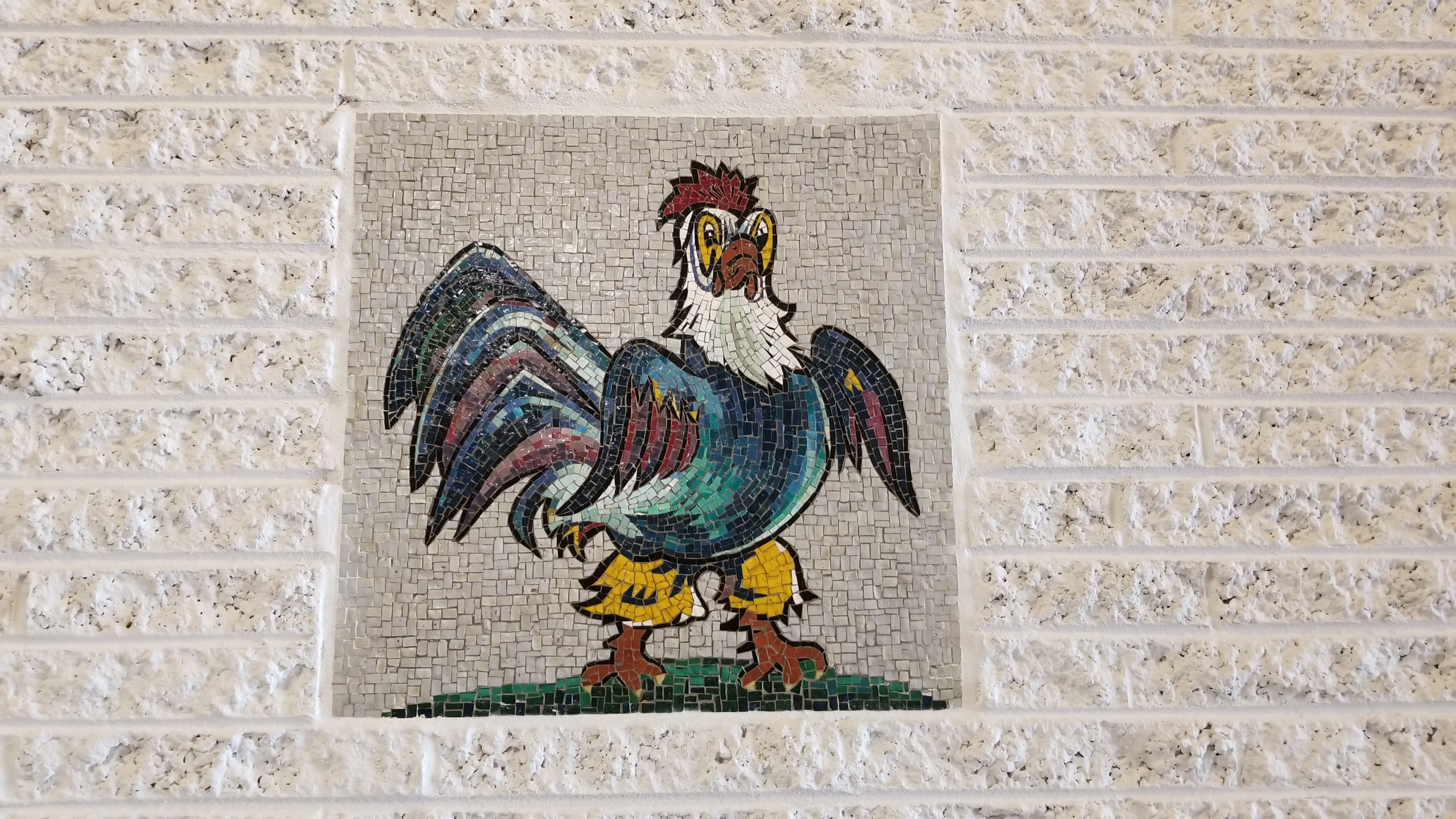
One of several Blue Hen tile mosaics

The mall's design featured terrazzo floors, rock walls, tile mosaics, multiple fountains, and a waterfall under the main staircase. A four-sided blue hen clock hung from the ceiling in center court, playing a crowing sound on the hour. The mall also featured a mezzanine level, located in the southern half of the building. This area contained the mall's public restrooms, along with professional space for law, medical, dental, and USAF recruitment offices among others. A narrow balcony connected the offices, overlooking the mall's first floor and waterfall.

In October 1976, a multi-panel mural was added to the mall’s main entry hall. Each panel depicted an important event from Delaware’s history. According to a plaque next to the mural, it was "dedicated to all past, present and future Delawareans", by then-Governor Sherman Tribbitt.

In 1982, the Dover Mall opened 4 miles (6.4 km) north of the Blue Hen Mall on North DuPont Highway. Sears had been interested in relocating from downtown Dover to the Blue Hen Mall, but was unable to reach an agreement with the mall's owner, Jardel Company, Inc. As a result, Sears became an opening-day anchor at the Dover Mall instead. Following the opening of the Dover Mall, the Blue Hen Mall entered a period of slow decline.

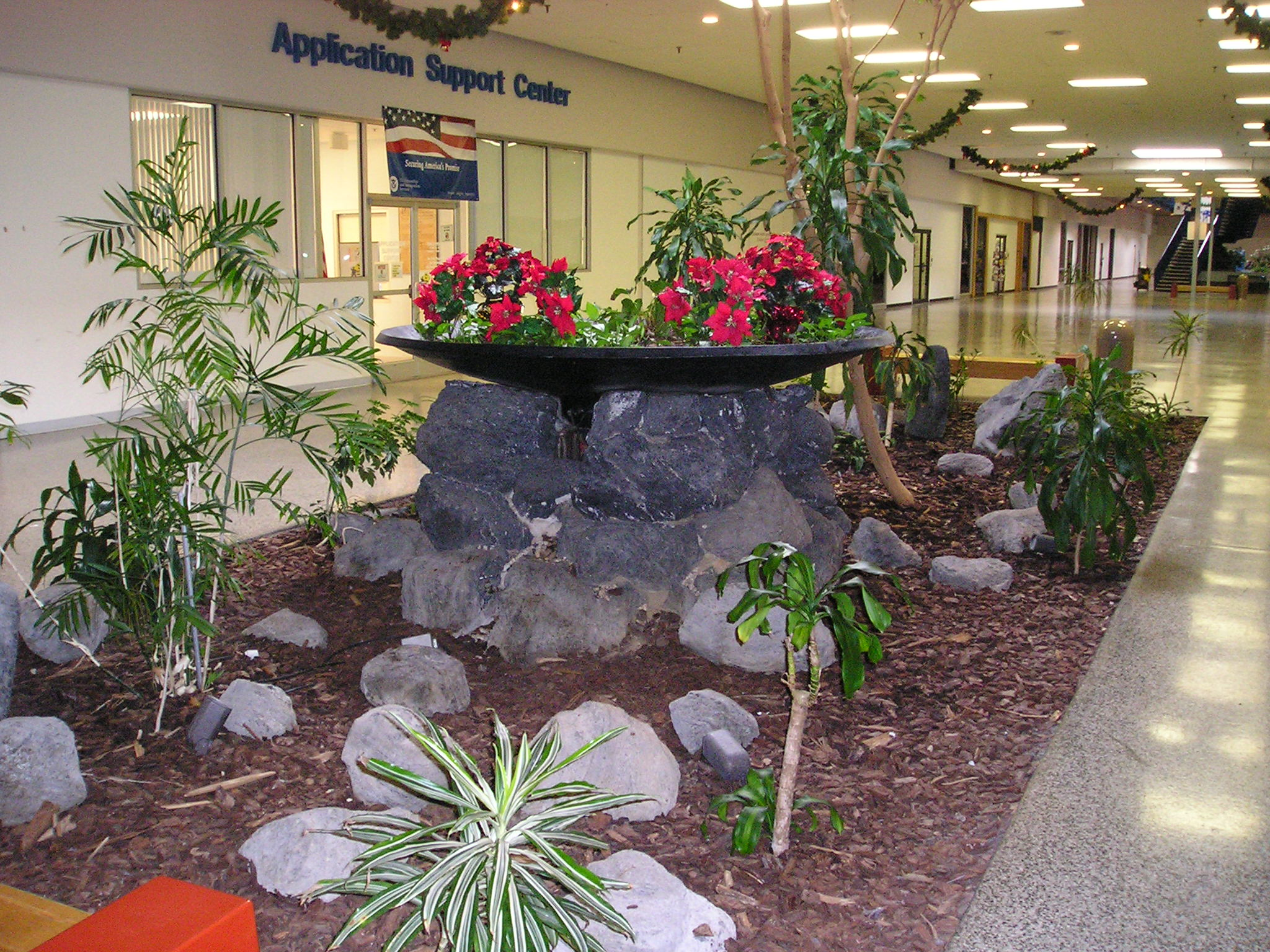
Indoor landscaping during the Christmas season

The Woolco store was shuttered in early 1983, along with the rest of the Woolworth-owned chain. It was replaced by a Roses Discount Store later in the same year.

In 1987, the mall announced a $400,000 renovation project, planned for completion by the mall’s 20th birthday. New signage with blue neon accents was added to the center court, and the hanging clock was removed on August 27, 1987.

By the early 1990s, the mall's inline store spaces were mostly occupied by locally owned stores and restaurants, including Sheila's Craft and Party World, Earle Teat Music, First State Coin, and Pizza Delight by Giacomo. A handful of national chains, including GNC, Radio Shack, and Waldenbooks remained at the mall into its final years. In 1991, a miniature golf course opened at the mall, improving entertainment options. A 1992 News Journal market survey showed the Dover Mall drawing a higher percentage of Dover-area shoppers, with 56% regularly shopping at the Dover Mall versus 47% at the Blue Hen Mall.

The mall's troubles accelerated in 1993. JCPenney relocated from the Blue Hen Mall to a newly built space at the Dover Mall in August 1993. Woolworth closed their Blue Hen Mall store after the 1993 holiday season as part of a larger corporate restructuring. Roses closed their Blue Hen Mall location on March 19, 1994, due to the chain entering Chapter 11 bankruptcy.

=== Dover Cinema ===
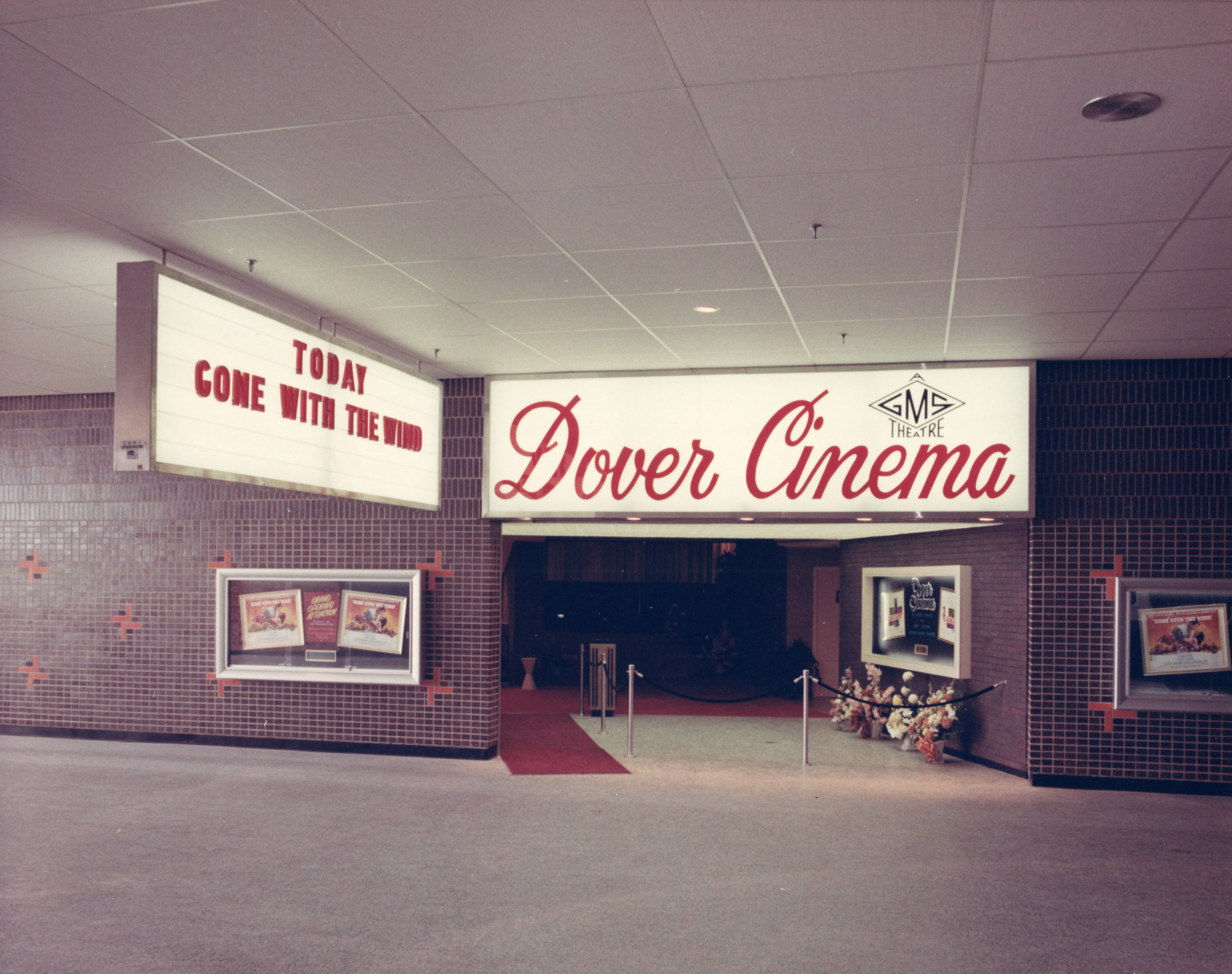
Dover Cinema on opening day (March 1969)

Dover Cinema, a single-screen movie theater, opened at the mall in March 1969 with a special showing of Gone with the Wind. The theater featured 1,200 stadium-style seats and a large 60-foot (18-meter) screen. It was the first in-mall movie theater in Delaware.

"The stadium design provides the advantages of the old balcony, but few of the disadvantages, such as excessive height. Parking space is available virtually at the door and the box office is entirely indoors, both of which help eliminate the problems of wind and weather", wrote critic Otto Dekom in an article about the theater's opening for the Wilmington, DE Morning News. The theater also featured a separate cry room for families with small children.

Business declined after two six-screen multiplexes opened in Dover during the early 1980s, and the theater closed c. 1985.

=== Blue Hen Mall Concert Hall ===
In September 1987, local musician Earle Teat leased the mall's theater, renaming it the Blue Hen Mall Concert Hall. Teat, who also owned a music store at the mall, invested $30,000 in sound and lighting upgrades for the venue.

It hosted at least 30 live concerts, primarily in the country genre. Most artists were booked for two shows in one night, typically at 7 pm and 10 pm. The seating capacity for concerts was 748. Notable performers included Tammy Wynette (1987), Chubby Checker (1988), Marty Stuart (1991), and Johnny Cash with June Carter Cash (1992).

The venue struggled at times with low ticket sales, and permanently closed c. 1998.

=== Sexual assaults ===
At least three cases of sexual assault occurred on mall property.

In July 1980, a woman was attacked by two men as she was attempting to leave the mall. They kidnapped her, beat her, committed sexual assault repeatedly, and burned her car. The two assailants were captured, convicted, and sentenced to prison. The victim later sued the mall's owners and managers, along with the movie theater's owner and the mall's security company. The lawsuit alleged that movie theater staff had noticed the two attackers acting suspiciously earlier in the evening but failed to act.

In August 1989, a woman was sexually assaulted, beaten, and robbed by a man hiding in the public restroom at the Woolworth's restaurant. Police arrested the assailant the next day, and he was ultimately convicted and imprisoned. The victim sued Woolworth's, the Blue Hen Mall, and the mall's security company, alleging the defendants didn't take sufficient precautions to protect customers. The lawsuit was settled out of court in 1995.

Another sexual assault was reported in August 1992, when a woman was grabbed in the Roses parking lot and forced into a car. According to police, two men held her while a third sexually assaulted her.

== Blue Hen Corporate Center ==
=== Transition from mall to corporate center ===
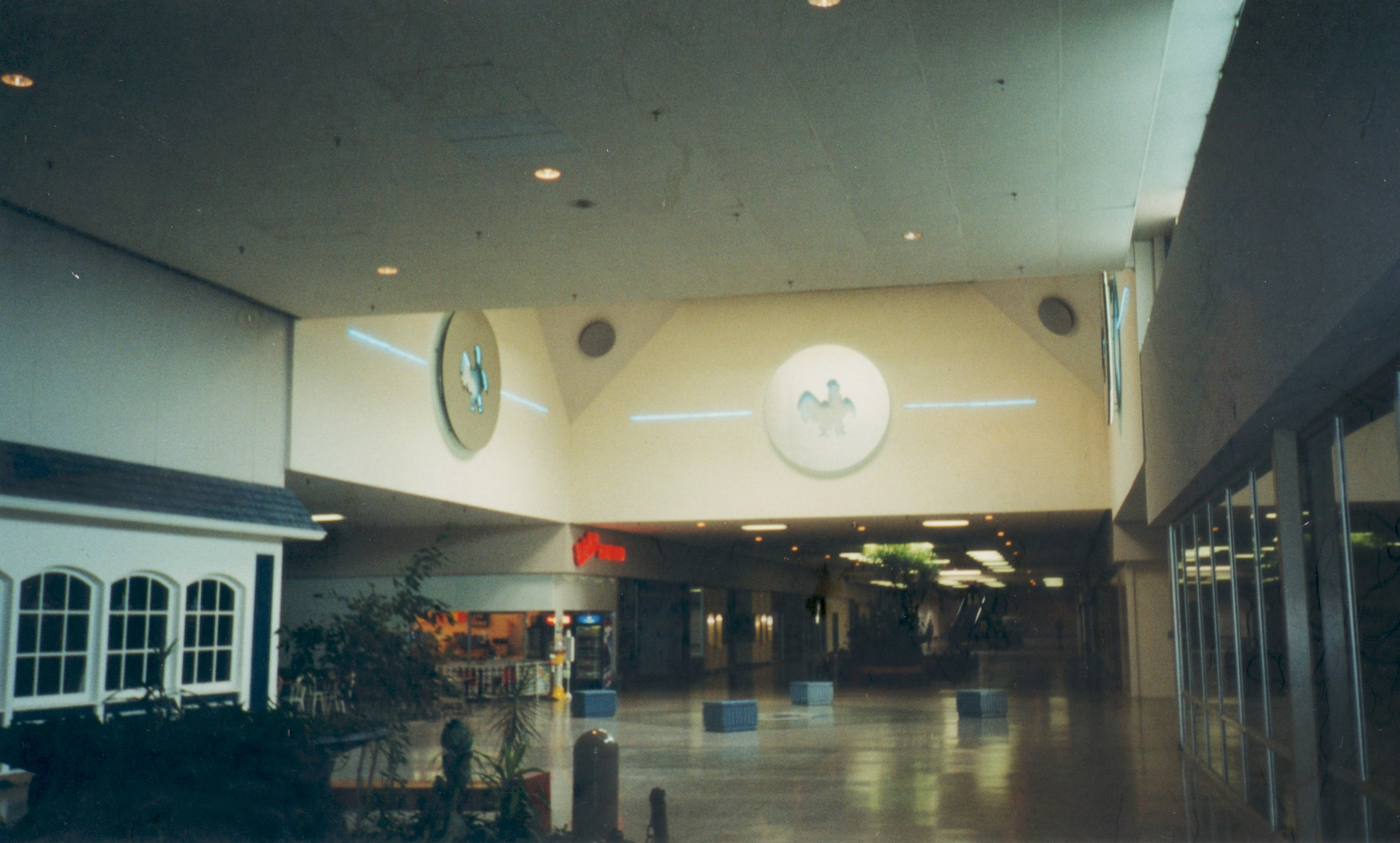
Center Court during the transition to Corporate Center

With only a few small retail tenants remaining, the Blue Hen Mall rebranded as the Blue Hen Corporate Center and Mall in early 1995. The former JCPenney space was renovated into an office location for 300 Aetna workers, while the former Roses space was converted to a call center for NationsBank (later Bank of America) with 270 employees. These large call center facilities would serve as anchors for the corporate center. The mall's remaining retail tenants were encouraged to stay, and the mall owners hoped to lure additional shops and restaurants that would cater to office workers.

In 2006, the property was sold by Blue Hen Properties to Pettinaro Enterprises LLC for $17.4 million. After the purchase, Pettinaro announced a plan to spend $10 million renovating the property.

The Bank of America call center closed in 2006 and Aetna left the center in 2009.

Pettinaro later completed an exterior renovation of the building, which added new office entrances, windows, landscaping, and signage, in addition to repairing original stucco finishes. The mall's interior corridors were finally closed to the public during the 2020 pandemic, although many of the mall's original features remained intact.

=== Anchor conversions for Bayhealth Medical Center ===
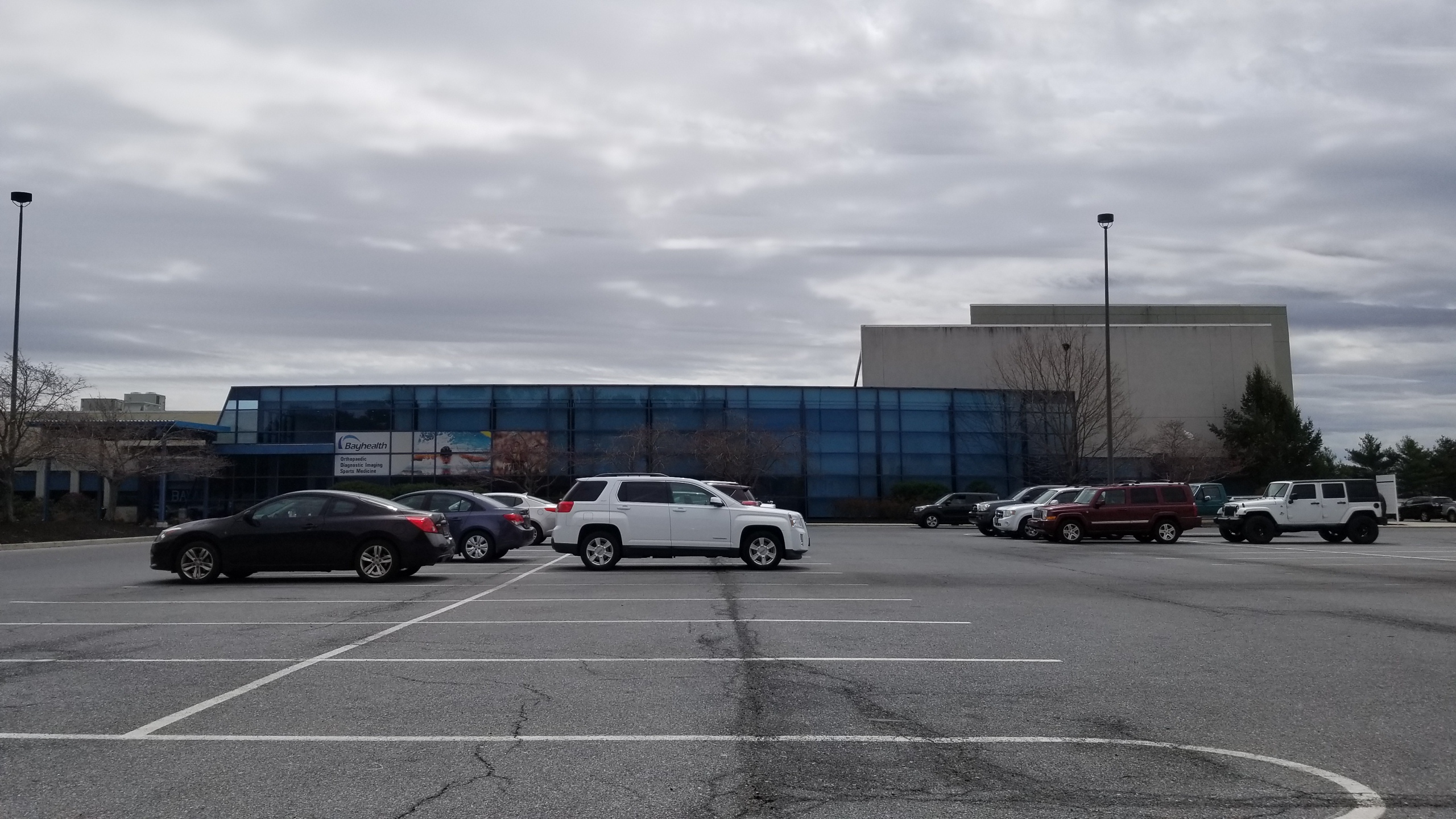
Bayhealth facility in former JCPenney

In September 2013, Bayhealth Medical Center leased the former JCPenney/Aetna space. After a major interior renovation, Bayhealth relocated their administrative offices, information technology, orthopedics and sports medicine departments to the new facility.

In January 2022, Bayhealth announced that it had completed a $17 million acquisition of both original end anchor spaces (formerly JCPenney & Woolco/Roses).

Construction in the former Woolco/Roses space was completed in 2024. Work included a new exterior facade, in addition to a comprehensive interior renovation. The space now houses several outpatient facilities open to the public. The final phase of the center, named Bayhealth at Blue Hen, opened in October 2024. Facilities include Pulmonology, Endocrinology, Occupational Health, Primary and Walk-in Medical Care, lab draws and ECG services, physical therapy, and speech therapy.

=== Other corporate center tenants ===
The U.S. Department of Veterans Affairs also operates an outpatient clinic at Blue Hen, offering "general medical care, including primary care, addiction and substance abuse treatment, mental health, laboratory services, PTSD treatment, women's health, and more."

Fresenius Kidney Care operates a dialysis center on the southeast side of the building.

Other tenants include the central Delaware offices of the U.S. Social Security Administration, Clearway Pain Solutions, and the Women Infants and Children (WIC) program of the Delaware Division of Public Health.

Parking lot pad sites are currently occupied by Firestone Tire (originally the Penney’s Auto Center), Enterprise Rent-a-Car, and Wayback Burgers (originally WSFS Bank).

=== Bayhealth Expansion and Future ===
In October 2026, Bayhealth announced its intention to purchase the entire property, including the former mall and outparcels. Although plans for the building have not been finalized, Bayhealth may create a "medical neighborhood" in the former mall, which could include surgical centers, doctors' offices, a pharmacy, cafe, or other health-related businesses. According to Kyle Benoit, Bayhealth's current COO, all existing tenant leases would be honored after the sale.

In November 2026, Bayhealth completed its purchase of the Blue Hen Corporate Center for $19.1 million. In a press release, Bayhealth also announced plans to create "an administrative and education hub" at Blue Hen, with a 20,000-square-foot (1,900 m^{2}) conference center. Bayhealth will develop a master plan for the property before announcing any detailed plans or timeline.

== List of former anchor tenants ==
Name	Year opened	Year closed	Notes
JCPenney	1968	1993	Replaced by Aetna (1994-2009), then Bayhealth (2013–present)
Woolco	1968	1983	Also included a Red Grille restaurant
Woolworth	1968	1994	Also included a Harvest House restaurant
Roses	1983	1994	Replaced Woolco; Replaced by Bank of America (1995-2006), then Bayhealth (2024-present)
Dover Cinema	1969	1985	Replaced by Concert Hall
Blue Hen Mall; Concert Hall	1987	1995	Space vacant since c. 1998
