= The Centre at Salisbury =

Shopping mall in Wicomico County, Maryland, U.S.

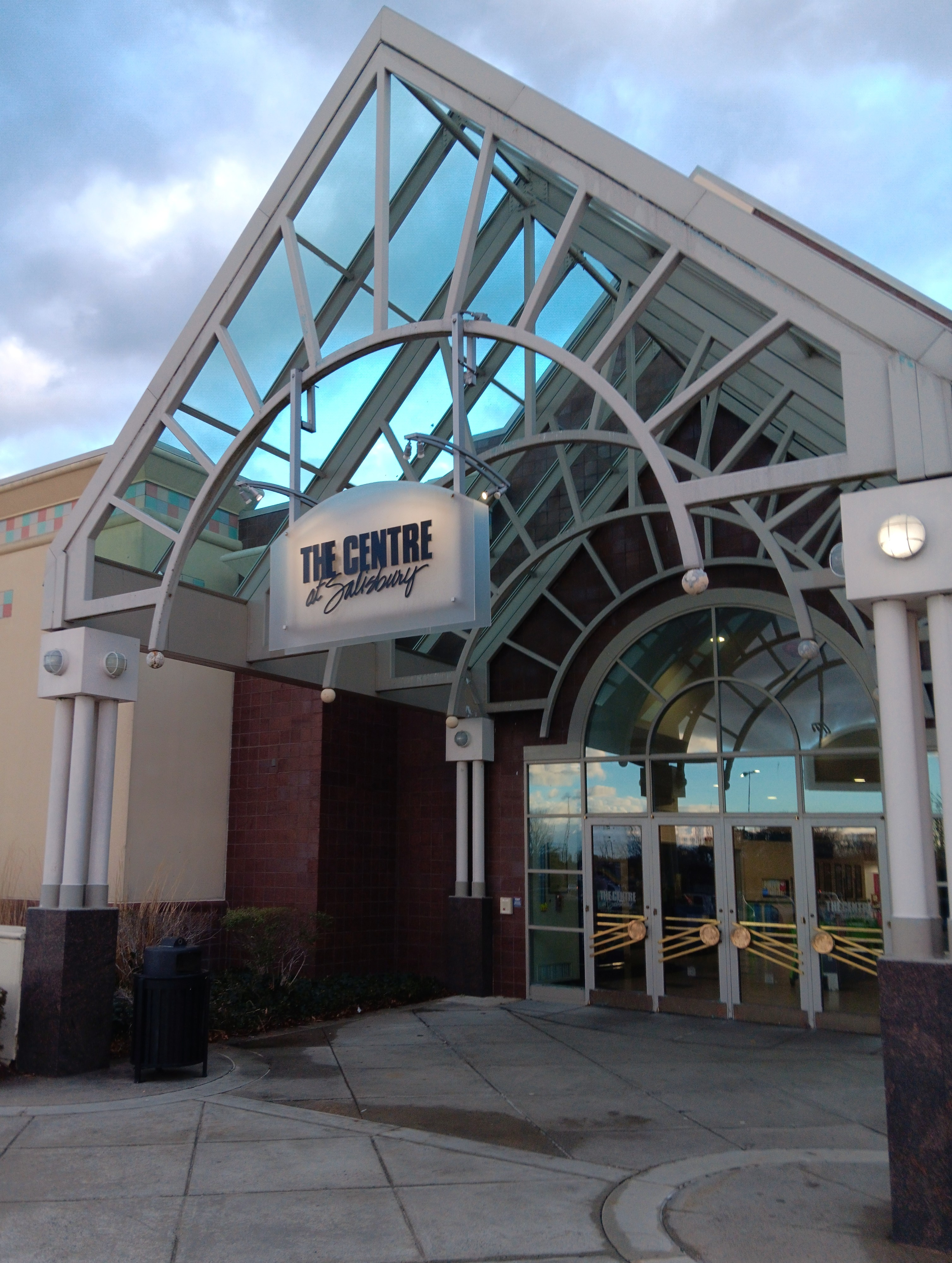
- Main entrance (February 2025)
- Location: Salisbury, Maryland, United States
- Coordinates: 38°24′3″N 75°34′0″W
- Address: 2300 N. Salisbury Blvd, 21804
- Opened: July 27, 1990; 36 years ago
- Developer: Petrie, Dierman and Partners
- Manager: 4th Dimension Properties
- Owner: 4th Dimension Properties
- Architect: James P. Ryan & Associates
- Num. of stores: 60
- Floor area: 856,895 square feet (79,608 m^{2})
- Floors: 1 (2 in Boscov's)
- Parking: Parking lot
- Public transit: Shore Transit bus: 116
- Website: www.centreatsalisbury.com

The Centre at Salisbury is a regional mall in Salisbury, Maryland. It is the only regional shopping mall within a 60-mile (97 km) radius and is the largest shopping center on the Eastern Shore of Maryland. The mall is anchored by Boscov's, Rural King (coming soon), and Regal Cinemas. Junior anchors include Dick's Sporting Goods, Burlington, H&M, and HomeGoods. Former anchors included Macy's, Sears, JCPenney, and Montgomery Ward, while former restaurants included Chuck E. Cheese and Ruby Tuesday.

The mall's opening led to the commercial development of north Salisbury, with several shopping centers opening near the mall after its construction.

== Overview ==
The Centre at Salisbury is located in the northern part of the City of Salisbury, in Wicomico County, Maryland. It is situated at the junction of U.S. Route 13, a major north–south route on the Delmarva Peninsula, and the Salisbury Bypass of U.S. Route 50, a major east–west route on the peninsula. The mall is served by Shore Transit bus route 116.

The mall has one floor, with 856,895 square feet (79,608.2 m^{2}). As of February 2025, the mall contains approximately 60 operating businesses and 27 vacant storefronts. The mall is anchored by a 140,000-square-foot (13,000 m^{2}) Boscov's and a 72,529-square-foot (6,738.2 m^{2}) freestanding Regal Salisbury & RPX with 16 screens. Rural King is coming soon to the mall, taking over its 140,000 square foot Macy’s. A 48,000-square-foot (4,500 m^{2}) Dick's Sporting Goods, a 40,584-square-foot (3,770.4 m^{2}) Burlington, and a 20,548-square-foot (1,909.0 m^{2}) H&M serve as junior anchors. A HomeGoods store is also attached but does not have a mall entrance. The mall contains a food court with eight eateries. Four additional casual dining restaurants are located on parking lot pad sites. The mall also includes a branch of the Wicomico Public Library. There is a vacant anchor space, previously occupied by Sears.

== History ==
=== 1987–1990: Development and opening ===
On September 11, 1987, news broke that developer Walter Petrie was planning to build a new shopping mall in the northern part of Salisbury. The mall, to be called The Centre at Salisbury, would be located on a 79-acre (32 ha) plot of land, approximately four miles (6.4 km) north of the city’s existing Salisbury Mall.

Petrie claimed that a new mall was needed to bring higher-quality stores to the region. He called the Salisbury Mall an "antiquated center that wasn't serving the market," and argued that Salisbury residents often had to leave the Eastern Shore to shop. Robert Di Pietro, the project's government liaison, said that both malls could survive. He claimed that having two malls in Salisbury would attract more shoppers to the city, and that both malls would be motivated by the competition.

On September 23 of that year, plans for the new mall were approved by the Salisbury Board of Zoning. The Centre at Salisbury would be a project of Petrie, Dierman and Partners, working with the Shopco Group. Boscov's, Leggett, JCPenney, and Montgomery Ward were announced as the anchor stores. A second phase would add two additional anchors.

Developers hoped the mall would attract shoppers from throughout the Eastern Shore, as well as tourists traveling to Ocean City. Construction of the Salisbury bypass would give the mall a more desirable location than the existing Salisbury Mall. Albert R. Boscov, then-chairman of Boscov's Department Stores, said "Without a doubt, the 'Centre' will have the best location in the entire area," referring to the mall's accessibility to beach-bound traffic.

The project's final hurdle was approval by the State Highway Administration. Plans called for construction of a flyover ramp to access the mall from U.S. Route 13. However, two local businesses objected, believing the access ramp would damage their properties. The negotiations delayed the start of construction by several months. Eventually, the Highway Administration withdrew the flyover plan, and the city council approved a simpler entrance from the highway.

A groundbreaking ceremony was held on October 26, 1988. The start of construction was delayed by rainy weather, but work was underway by April 1989. The mall cost an estimated $80 million to build, and employed approximately 500 construction workers.

==== Construction accidents ====
On the morning of June 5, 1989, a 25-foot (7.6 m) scaffold collapsed at the work site. Five workers fell to the ground, with some being temporarily trapped under debris. Two hours later, another worker was injured in a forklift accident. All were treated and released from Peninsula General Hospital. On November 4, 1989, one worker was killed in a construction accident. John "Redbird" Moore was working for contractor Steel Tech, when he lost his balance pulling a loose cable and fell 30 feet (9.1 m) to his death. More than 800 people attended his funeral.

All three original anchor stores opened on July 21, 1990, a few days before the mall's official opening.

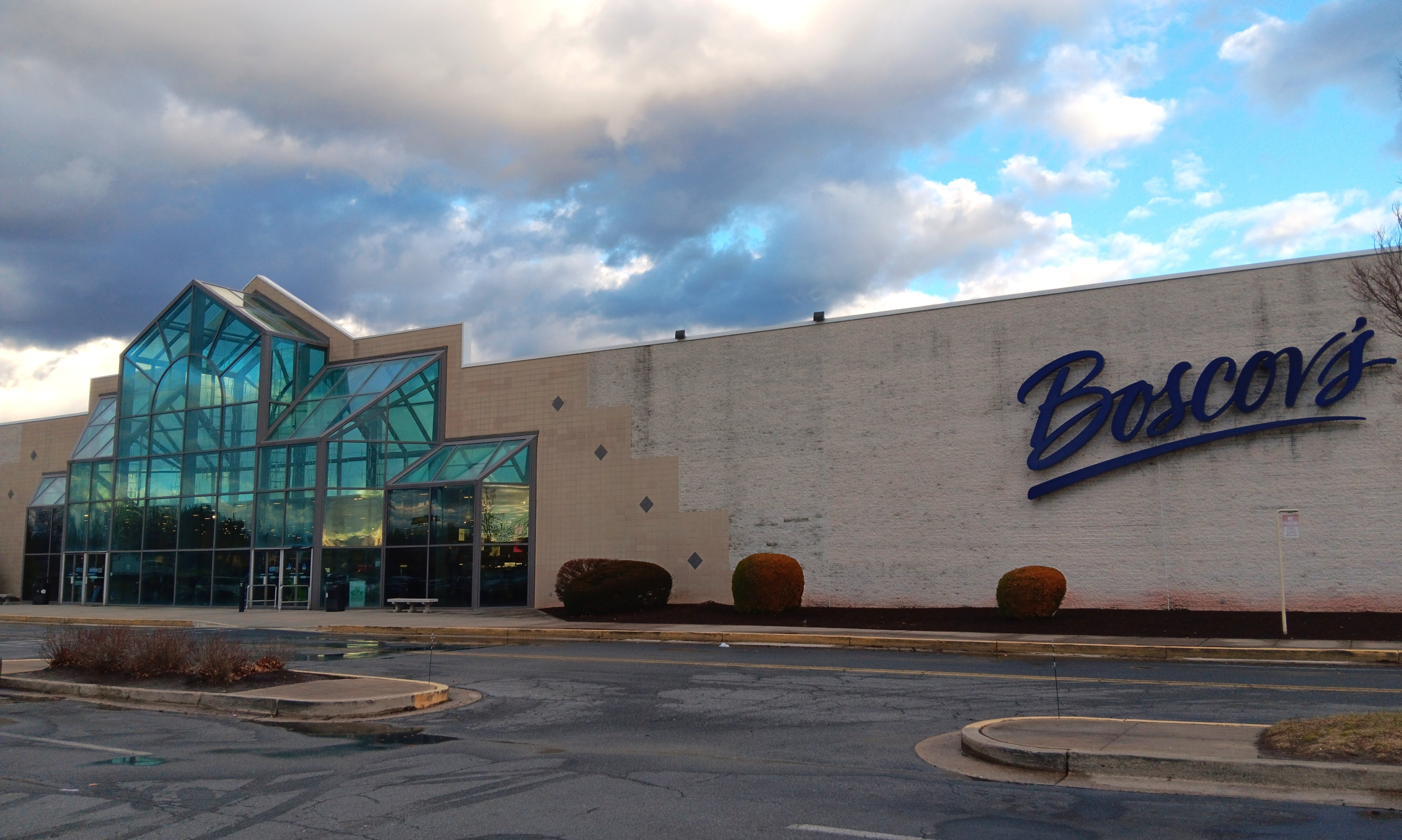
Facade of Boscov's (February 2025)

Boscov's was the only completely new anchor to the Salisbury region, and its 140,000-square-foot (13,000 m^{2}) store impressed the Salisbury Daily Times: "Certainly the most beautiful store in the area, Boscov's is a fantasy of mirrors and marble, with massive, glittering chandeliers, plush carpeting and soaring display pieces." The mall's Montgomery Ward replaced an older location on South Salisbury Boulevard. The 107,000-square-foot (9,900 m^{2}) store was given a modern warehouse design, with exposed wiring and pipes, instead of the traditional drop ceiling.

JCPenney was the smallest anchor, opening as an 86,222-square-foot (8,010.3 m^{2}) store. It replaced a location on East Main Street in downtown Salisbury. The Centre at Salisbury officially opened on July 25, 1990, with live music, remote broadcasts from local radio stations, kite-making workshops and kite-flying demonstrations. An estimated 75,000 people visited the mall during its grand opening.

Designed by the architectural firm of James P. Ryan & Associates, the mall featured "marble floors, landscaped gardens, fountains and pools, all under domed skylights." The Daily Times described the central water feature: "A glass-bottomed bridge spans cascading waterfalls that trickle down from two ends to meet in the middle".

A newspaper editorial said the mall was "guaranteed to forever change the retail shopping scene on the Eastern Shore", describing the mall as "truly amazing". Developer Petrie explained, "The amenities—the skylights, fountains, marble—are unusual for a market this size. But we think it will end up resulting in additional sales. [...] We believe it will become a showplace for people visiting."

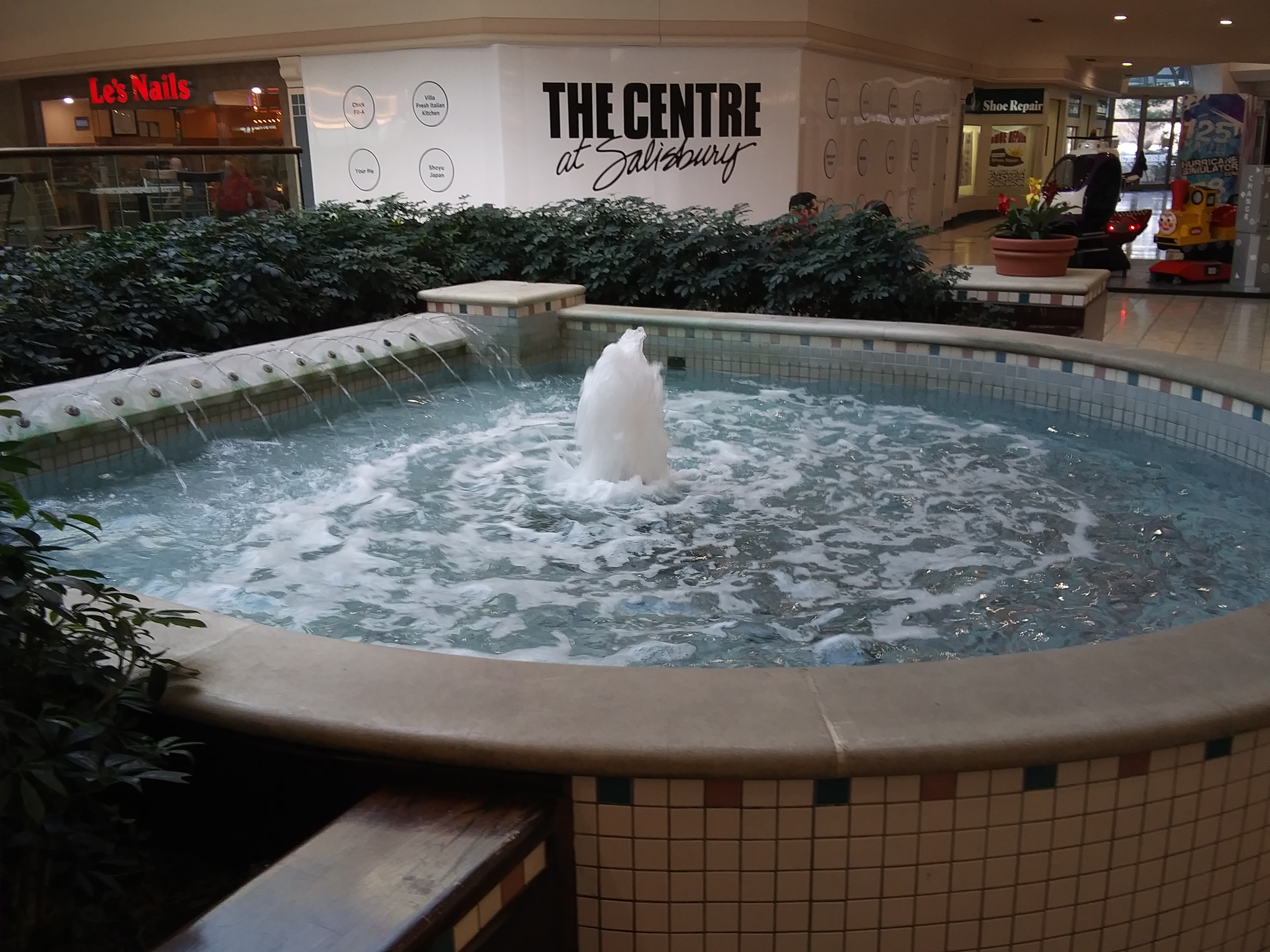
Fountain in Boscov's court (February 2019)

Each of the mall’s courts was given a distinctive identity. The Boscov's court contained a built-in stage with an attached fountain. Hoyt Cinema 10 opened at the mall on July 27, 1990. The 35,000-square-foot (3,300 m^{2}) theater had a total capacity of 1,900 guests, with each auditorium holding between 170 and 300 people. The mall also included a 25,000-square-foot (2,300 m^{2}) food court, with Chick-fil-A and A&W among the opening-day eateries.

=== 1989–2000: Sears and Hecht's ===
In September 1989, with construction of the Centre at Salisbury ongoing, officials from Sears informed Salisbury Mall management of their intention to relocate to the new Centre mall at the end of their lease. By November 1989, Hecht's had also announced their intention to relocate from the older mall.

While negotiations with Hecht's and Sears continued, plans for Leggett to open at the Centre stalled. Construction on the Leggett space was officially halted in October 1989. Developers claimed the stoppage was needed to adjust the mall's layout for Sears and Hecht's. At this point, Petrie stated that Leggett was still planning to anchor the mall, but that its opening would be delayed. He updated city officials a month later, saying Leggett was no longer committed to opening at the mall. In April 1990, mall developers confirmed that Hecht's would instead occupy the space previously intended for Leggett.

On April 21, 1990, Sears officially announced it would be building a store at the Centre to replace its 22-year-old location at the old Salisbury Mall. The new 132,300-square-foot (12,290 m^{2}) store would open in 1991, as part of the mall's second phase of construction. After the announcements that both Sears and Hecht's would relocate from the Salisbury Mall to the Centre at Salisbury, concern began to grow over the fate of the older mall. Government officials criticized the owners of the Salisbury Mall for not doing more to retain tenants. An editorial in the Daily Times concluded: "Instead of stimulating business for the old mall, the new mall appears destined to put the old mall out of business." Some in the local community felt misled by the mall developers, after previously being told that both malls could coexist.

Hecht's opened in the Centre at Salisbury on May 8, 1991. At 140,000 square feet (13,000 m^{2}), the new store was 57% larger than their previous Salisbury location and employed 100 more people. Sears opened at the Centre on October 1, 1991, with twice the display space of their previous Salisbury location. The Centre changed ownership for the first time in August 1995, when the mall's original developer, Shopco, sold the mall to California-based Macerich for approximately $78 million. At the time of purchase, the mall was 89% leased and was averaging more than $150 million in annual sales. In 1998, the Wicomico Public Library opened a branch at the mall.

==== 1995 shooting ====
A fatal shooting occurred at the mall on December 23, 1995. One victim, Roy Davis III, died from his injuries after being transported to the Peninsula Regional Medical Center. Two other people were hit by gunfire, though their injuries were not life-threatening. The shooting happened at 7:45 p.m. EST on a busy Saturday evening, while the mall was filled with an estimated 5,000 Christmas shoppers. Prosecutors said Gabriel Cannon fired six shots from a handgun during an argument with Davis, after the two men randomly spotted each other at the mall. The argument was related to an earlier incident, where Cannon was allegedly beaten and robbed by Davis. Davis had been criminally charged over that incident, and Cannon was expected to testify against him at trial.

Cannon, then 23 years old, had no prior criminal record, and was a full-time student. Police in Virginia arrested Cannon and a relative in connection with the shooting, charging both with first-degree murder. Cannon was ultimately convicted on lesser charges of manslaughter, attempted manslaughter, and reckless endangerment, and was sentenced to prison. Charges against the other defendant were dropped after it became clear that Cannon was the only shooter.

=== 2000–2008: Introduction of Regal Cinemas ===
On December 28, 2000, Montgomery Ward announced it was filing for Chapter 11 bankruptcy and closing all of its remaining stores. The company's location in the mall permanently closed its doors on March 25, 2001. A Daily Times editorial eulogized the "beloved" retailer, which had operated in Salisbury for decades: "One hazard to growing old is that the things you rely on disappear as you outlive them. But the idea that we actually observe the end of Montgomery Ward Inc. is especially difficult to comprehend. [...] We find it hard to believe the current roster of retailers will be remembered as fondly."

In May 2003, Regal Entertainment Group (REG) acquired Hoyt Cinemas. Five months later, Regal announced it would be closing and replacing the mall's existing 10-screen cinema. A new 16-screen theater would be built on some of the land previously occupied by Montgomery Ward. At twice the size of the old theater, it would feature modern amenities and upgraded stadium seating. Demolition of the former Ward location began in September 2004. An outdoor pedestrian plaza replaced the vacant department store, and a new mall entrance was constructed. The new theater would be located in a freestanding building next to the mall, opening onto the plaza. Plans called for two additional retail buildings to complete the reconfigured space, although only one was actually built. The mall had difficulty leasing the new retail building, which still remained vacant a full year after its construction.

Regal Cinemas opened their new Salisbury Stadium 16 & RPX theater on December 2, 2005. The theater featured several amenities missing from the previous location, including high-back rocking chairs and digital surround sound. In February 2006, Dick's Sporting Goods applied for permits to begin construction on a Centre at Salisbury location. The Hecht's store was rebranded as Macy's in September 2006, after Federated Department Stores purchased May Department Stores.

Dick's Sporting Goods opened their 48,000-square-foot (4,500 m^{2}) store on October 8, 2006. The store replaced the mall spaces previously occupied by the 10-screen movie theater and a few smaller stores, located on the southeast side of the building. It was the first Dick's store on the Eastern Shore. By December 2006, the mall was able to achieve its highest overall occupancy rate, with approximately 96% of space leased. In 2007, the Wicomico Public Library's Centre branch moved into a new, larger location across from Chuck E. Cheese. Renovations to the 2,700-square-foot (250 m^{2}) space cost $30,000.

=== 2008 renovations ===
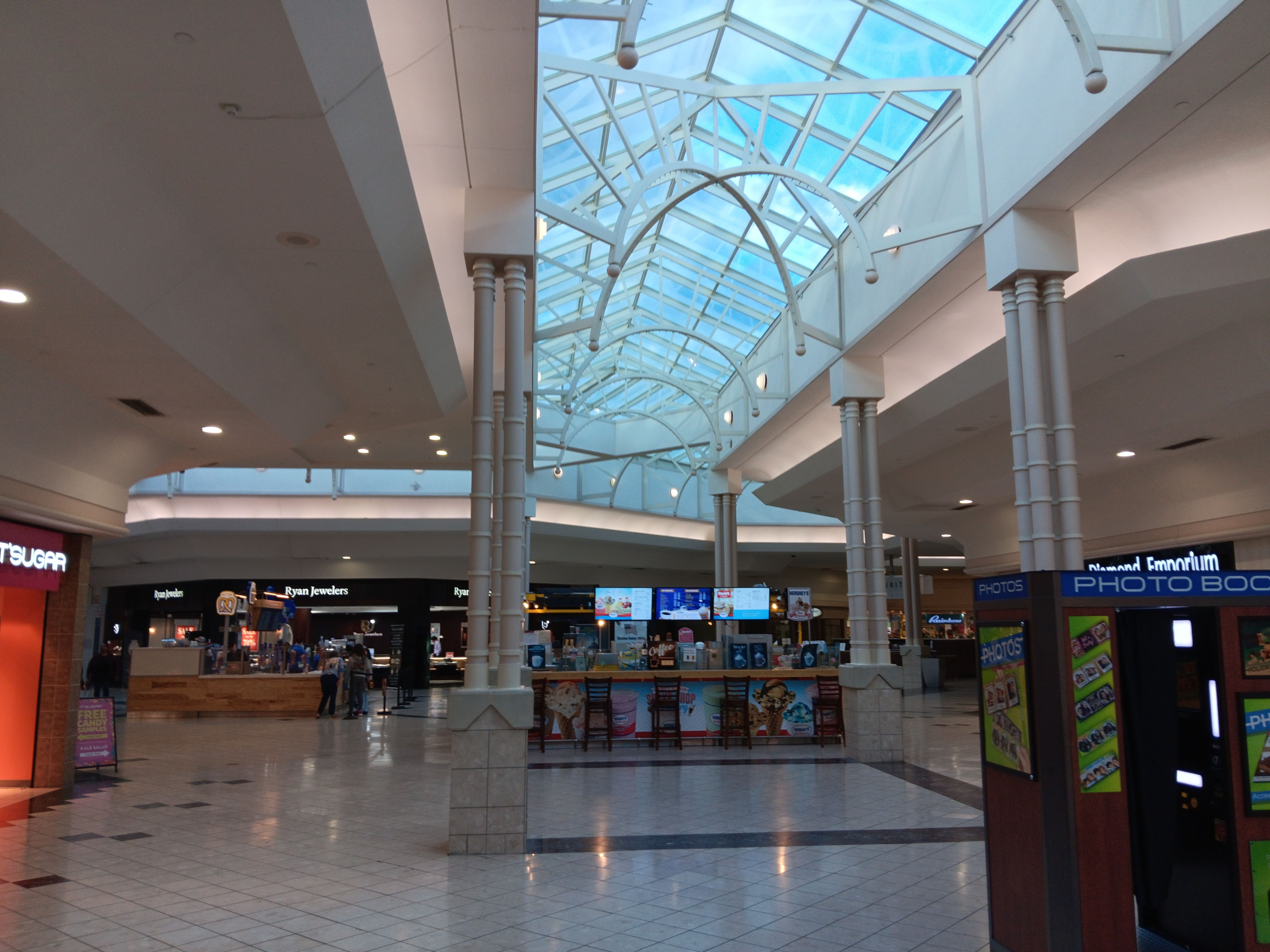
Interior of Centre at Salisbury, looking toward center court (2025)

The Centre at Salisbury completed a partial renovation in 2008, focused on the mall's center court. New kiosks and seating were added for Coffee Beanery and Auntie Anne's, while the decorative water fountains, bridges, and planters were completely removed.

A children's play area and guest services desk were added to the hallway between center court and Sears. The food court received minor updates. Other changes included the addition of plush seating, energy-efficient lighting, and Wi-Fi. A Daily Times editorial said the mall's renovations were "far more than a skin-deep cosmetic facelift" because they "focus[ed] on amenities only a mall can offer" such as "comfortable seating and a welcoming ambiance".

=== 2013–present: ===
In December 2013, Macerich sold the Centre at Salisbury to GGP spinoff Rouse Properties in a package deal with another mall. Rouse paid a total price of $292.5 million for both malls. The Centre was 93.8% leased at the time of sale.

On January 15, 2014, JCPenney announced it would be closing its Salisbury location, along with 32 other "underperforming" stores across the country. JCPenney closed on May 3, 2014. On March 24, 2016, Swedish fast fashion retailer H&M announced that it would be opening a 21,000-square-foot (2,000 m^{2}) Centre at Salisbury location in the fall of 2016. H&M replaced five smaller store spaces near the former JCPenney. Brookfield Asset Management acquired Rouse Properties for $2.8 billion on July 6, 2016, giving them ownership of the Centre at Salisbury.

On October 23, 2016, HomeGoods opened a store in a 25,280-square-foot (2,349 m^{2}) portion of the former JCPenney space. The HomeGoods store does not have a mall entrance and can only be accessed from the parking lot. On December 18, 2017, mall officials announced that Burlington would open a store at the Centre, replacing the largest remaining portion of the former JCPenney space. The Burlington store opened on September 14, 2018. On December 27, 2018, Sears Holdings announced that the Salisbury Sears location would close in March 2019. The Salisbury closure was part of a round of 80 store closings for the struggling chain, which had recently filed for Chapter 11 bankruptcy.

Boscov's launched a $10 million renovation and expansion project in 2019. The work included an 18,000-square-foot (1,700 m^{2}) addition—replacing the former garden center—which moved the store's auditorium and restrooms to the first floor. A comprehensive renovation of the entire store, which removed its original neon elements, was then completed in time for the location's 30th anniversary in 2020. In January 2020, Macy’s announced it would be permanently closing its Salisbury location. The store closed in March 2020. Ruby Tuesday closed their restaurant at the mall in February 2021. The chain, which had been struggling for years, closed hundreds of restaurants after filing for bankruptcy in October 2020.

On March 17, 2021, Kohan Retail Investment Group quietly purchased the Centre at Salisbury from Brookfield Properties. In 2023, 4th Dimension Properties acquired the Centre at Salisbury. Shortly after the purchase, the company's principal officer, Felix Reznick, told local media "My malls don't die" and pledged to bring new tenants to the mall.

The mall's Chuck E. Cheese restaurant and arcade closed in April 2026.

In October 2026, it was announced that Rural King was coming soon to The Centre at Salisbury, taking over its former Macy’s, as part of the ongoing effort to revitalize the mall with more businesses
