= Abraham Groves =

Canadian physician and surgeon (1847–1935)

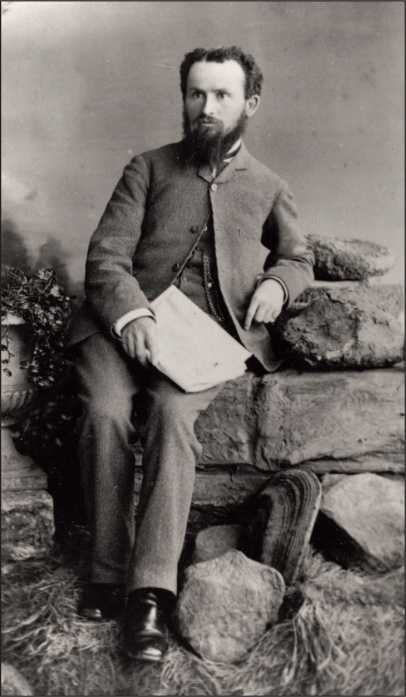
- Groves circa 1870
- Born: September 8, 1847; Peterborough, Canada West
- Died: May 12, 1935 (aged 87); Fergus, Ontario
- Occupation: Physician

Abraham Groves (September 8, 1847 – May 12, 1935) was a Canadian physician and surgeon in Fergus, Ontario, who is credited with performing the first appendectomy in North America, in 1883. He is also recognized for performing Canada's first suprapubic lithotomy and for his early use of aseptic technique in surgery, possibly being the first person to use surgical gloves for infection control. Groves practiced in Fergus for sixty years, and the hospital he founded, formerly the Royal Alexandra, is now named the Groves Memorial Community Hospital in recognition of his work.

== Early life and education ==
Groves was born in Peterborough, Canada West, on September 8, 1847, the fifth child of Irish immigrants Abraham and Margaret Groves. In 1856, the family moved to a farm outside the town of Fergus. Groves completed his early schooling in Fergus and in 1867 moved to Toronto to study at the Toronto School of Medicine, where he was a classmate of William Osler. While Groves received a thorough education in anatomy at the Toronto school, the quality of clinical training was poor due to the temporary closure of the Toronto General Hospital and a shortage of instructors. Groves graduated in 1871, and after six months of training under a Toronto doctor, he returned to Fergus where he set up a medical practice. Unaffiliated with local hospitals, Groves travelled to patients' homes and lodging places to carry out surgeries.

== Career ==
Groves was an early practitioner of aseptic technique in surgery. During his first laparotomy in 1874, Groves boiled his instruments and sponges before use and cleaned his hands and his patient's skin with boiled water. This would become his routine practice: the Dittrick Museum of Medical History holds one of Groves's surgical knives, manufactured in 1870, which shows wear from frequent boiling. Regarding boiling instruments, Groves stated to the museum curator in 1932 that "previous to that date I never heard it was done".

In 1885, Groves had just operated on a pus-filled abdomen when he encountered another patient who needed urgent surgery. Recognizing that it would be dangerous to operate with his bare hands, Groves boiled his rubber riding gloves and wore them during the surgery. If this date, given in Groves's 1934 memoir, is accurate, this would be the first documented use of surgical gloves to prevent infection.

In 1878, Groves performed Canada's first suprapubic lithotomy, in a tavern in Guelph, Ontario. At the time, bladder stones were extracted through the perineum, but this route was not suitable for this patient as he weighed over 300 pounds (140 kg). Groves made an abdominal incision to access the patient's bladder and extracted six stones. The patient recovered quickly. Groves was an early practitioner of many urologic surgeries, including prostatectomy, removal of the renal capsule, and surgical repair of the bladder and urethra.

Groves is credited with performing the first appendectomy in North America. Abdominal surgery was rare at the time: Groves stated that "during my undergraduate course there was not, so far as I know, one abdomen opened in the Toronto General Hospital". The operation took place on May 10, 1883. Groves removed the appendix of a twelve-year-old boy, using a flame-heated probe to sterilize the site where it was severed. The boy recovered, but his father was unhappy with Groves, believing the doctor's actions to be reckless. When Groves shared the news of his operation with other doctors, they were similarly displeased. A colleague recounted that the Toronto Medical Association condemned his actions, calling him a "backwoods doctor". Nevertheless, Groves went on to perform many appendectomies. Groves kept the appendix from his first surgery preserved in a glass bottle, which his widow donated to the Toronto Academy of Medicine in 1961. The specimen was transferred to the Canadian Museum of science and technology, following the closure of the University of Toronto's History of Medicine Collection, though it is no longer on display.

Some uncertainty exists regarding the date of Groves's appendectomy, as Groves did not publish his findings at the time. The 1883 appendectomy was first described in a review of appendicitis published by Groves in 1903. Groves gave a contradictory account of his appendectomy in a 1928 interview, claiming to have based his technique on papers by British surgeon Lawson Tait which were first published in 1890. A student of Groves, John Wishart, claimed to have performed North America's first appendectomy in 1885.

In 1902, Groves opened the Royal Alexandra Hospital in Fergus and established a nursing school. In 1932, Groves closed the nursing school in response to regulatory pressure and donated the hospital to the community. After Groves's death, the hospital was renamed to Groves Memorial in his honour. As of 2019, the Groves Memorial Community Hospital continues to serve the town of Fergus and surrounding areas.

Groves practiced in the town of Fergus for a total of sixty years. During his career, he served as physician and surgeon for the Grand Trunk Railway and the Wellington County House of Industry and Refuge. He also established an electric lighting plant in Fergus.

In 1934, Groves published an autobiography titled All in The Day's Work, which reflected on his medical career. The book received positive reviews in The Lancet and the British Medical Journal.

Groves died of pneumonia in Fergus on May 12, 1935, at the age of 87.

== Personal life ==
In his personal life, Groves was a devout Anglican, publishing several poems on religious subjects. He was a member of the Masonic Order, and served on the Fergus school board and village council; he was elected reeve in 1885, but could not take the position due to his post at the Wellington County House of Industry.

Groves married Jennie Gibbon of Elora, Ontario, in 1874 and had two children with her. After Gibbon's death, Groves married Ethel Burke, a graduate nurse in Fergus. Groves owned a pet alligator and a parrot named Polly. The parrot was taxidermied and donated to the Wellington County Museum and Archives in the late 1970s.
