= Poorhouse =

Public institution providing housing and relief for the poor

Poorhouses were public institutions used from the seventeenth through the mid twentieth centuries to provide relief for people unable to support themselves, including the elderly, the sick, people with disabilities, widows, and others. In North America—particularly in the United States and Canada—they were usually operated by local governments and often took the form of "poor farms", where residents who were able to work were expected to contribute labor. One Vermont Law from 1797 detailed that towns were squarely responsible for social welfare, not the state or federal government. Similar laws existed across the nation at the time.

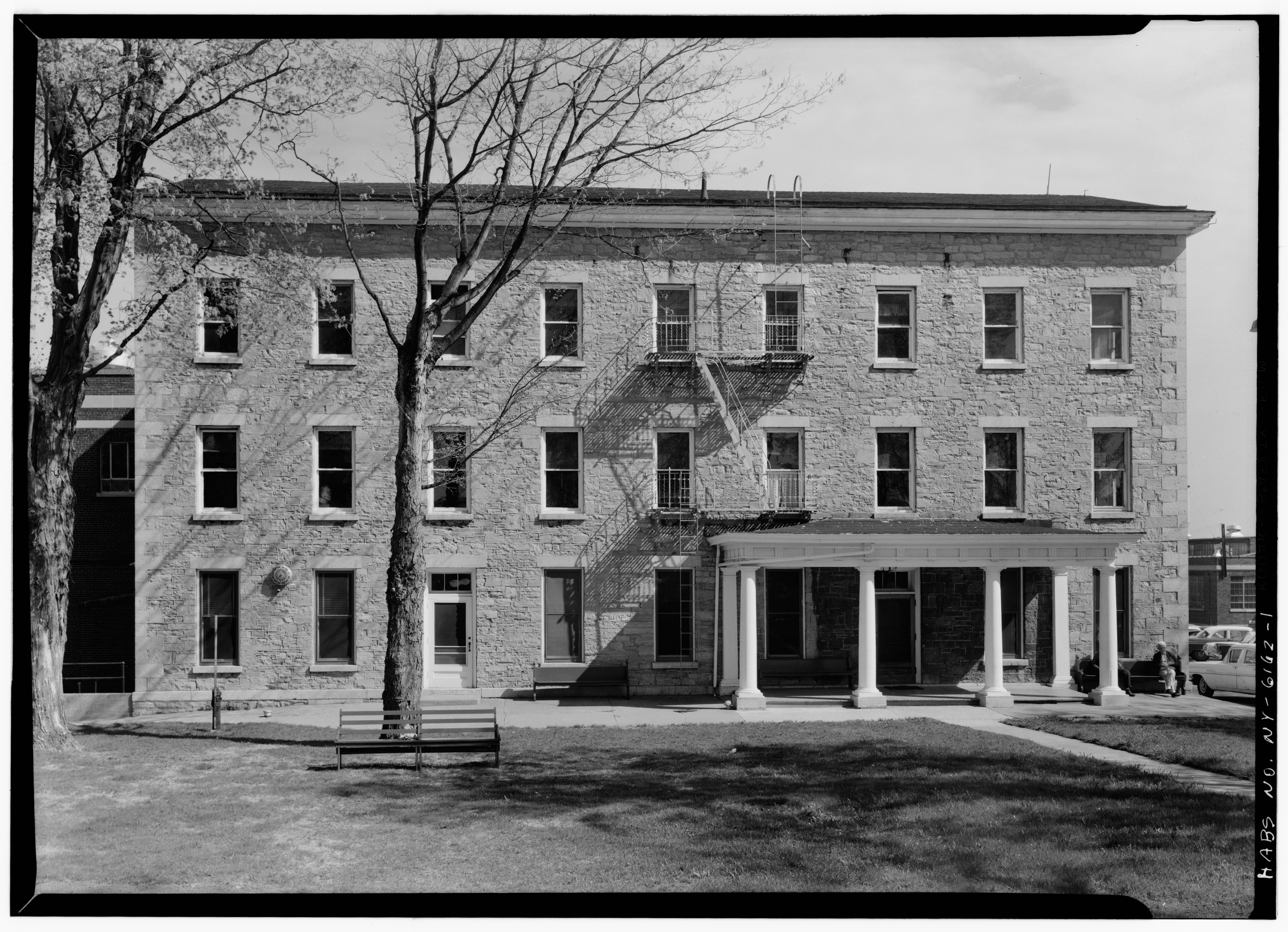
Onondaga County Poorhouse, New York

Poorhouses developed from earlier systems of poor relief influenced by the English Poor Laws and by social attitudes that distinguished between the "deserving" and "undeserving" poor. Known by various names—including almshouses, poor farms, houses of industry, and county homes—these institutions varied widely in organization and purpose. Unlike the British workhouse system, however, North American poorhouses were typically locally administered and served primarily as residential institutions for a wide range of dependent populations.

During the nineteenth century poorhouses became the principal institutions of public welfare in much of North America. Over time their role changed as reformers created specialized institutions for groups such as children, the mentally ill, and disabled people. The importance of poorhouses declined during the twentieth century as expanding welfare programs, pensions, and social assistance systems gradually replaced local institutional relief. These shift in welfare Federalism closely coincided with LBJ's War on Poverty.

== Terminology ==
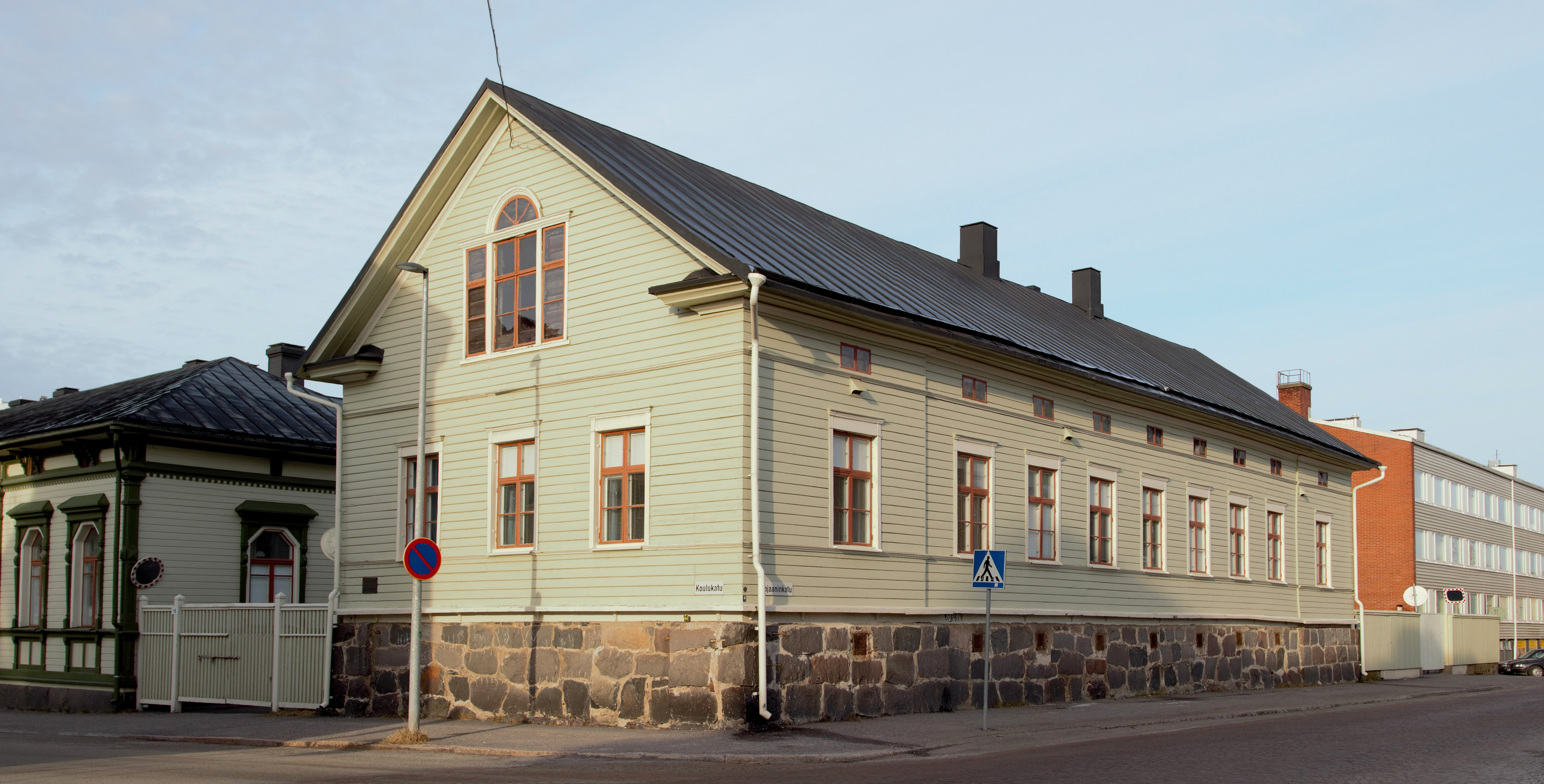
The building located at Kajaaninkatu 30 in Oulu, Finland was originally built as a poorhouse in 1831, before becoming a primary school in 1874.

Poorhouses were known by several names, including almshouses, poor farms, town farms, houses of industry, county homes, and city homes. These terms generally referred to similar public institutions that provided housing and basic support for people unable to support themselves. Although terminology varied by region and period, their purpose remained the same: to provide publicly funded relief for the indigent. The term "poor farm" usually referred to a rural poorhouse where residents performed agricultural or other labor to help support the facility. In the late nineteenth century many counties began referring to their institutions as county homes or city homes, reflecting changing attitudes toward public welfare and the growing association of poorhouses with care for the elderly.

In the United States, many poorhouses were located on farms in rural areas. These institutions—often called poor farms—differed from the large urban workhouses associated with Victorian England and some American cities. Workhouses in Britain were typically designed primarily as labor institutions intended to discourage reliance on public relief, whereas American poorhouses served as residential institutions that housed a broad range of people in need of support. By the mid-nineteenth century, nearly every county in the United States operated a poorhouse or similar institution. Residents included the elderly, people with physical or mental disabilities, the chronically ill, children, widows, immigrants, and others who were unable to support themselves.

By the early twentieth century, efforts were made to reduce the negative associations attached to the term “poor.” Many poor farms and poorhouses were therefore renamed county homes or infirmaries, reflecting a growing emphasis on providing housing and care for the elderly, destitute, and infirm.

== United States ==
=== Colonial poor relief ===
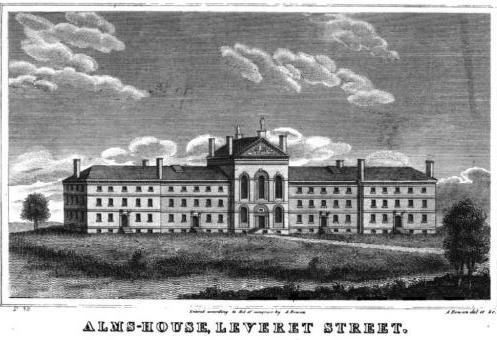
Leverett Street Almshouse, Boston, 1828

Poor relief in colonial America developed largely from English precedents, particularly the English Poor Laws, which established the principle that local communities were responsible for supporting the indigent. The first colonial poor laws were enacted in Plymouth Colony in 1642, followed by Virginia in 1646, Connecticut in 1673, and Massachusetts in 1676. In most colonies the administration of relief was carried out by local officials known as overseers of the poor. Public assistance was typically denied to individuals who had family members capable of supporting them. Residency requirements used to determine eligibility for public assistance, first appeared in Plymouth Colony. Under these rules, each town was responsible for supporting its own poor residents. Early laws limited relief for newcomers, however, and individuals who had lived in a community for less than three months were generally not eligible for aid. After that period, those considered strangers could be required to leave the town.

Several methods of poor relief were used during the colonial period. Many communities relied on outdoor relief, which provided small amounts of food, fuel, clothing, or money while allowing recipients to remain in their homes. In other cases, towns auctioned the care of poor individuals to the lowest bidder, contracted with local families to house them, or required able-bodied paupers to work for local farmers. Outdoor relief was generally intended to assist people during periods of temporary hardship, particularly the elderly, the sick, and families facing short-term economic difficulties. Institutional relief existed but was limited. Large towns occasionally established almshouses or workhouses, such as Boston’s early workhouse (1738) and New York City’s almshouse, founded in 1736. These early institutions housed the poor alongside the sick, the mentally ill, and sometimes criminals.

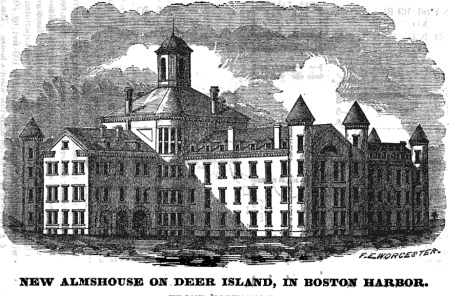
Almshouse, Boston, 1851

By the late eighteenth century two different systems for administering poor relief had developed. In New England, towns were generally responsible for helping the poor, whereas in Pennsylvania and several other states the administration of relief was assigned to county governments. The Pennsylvania approach proved influential in the early republic because it permitted counties to establish poorhouses with approval from the state legislature. These institutions were not mandatory; counties petitioned the legislature for authorization to construct them. During the early nineteenth century poorhouses became increasingly common. Even as poorhouses developed, most assistance to the poor continued to take place outside institutions, and in many communities more people received outdoor relief than lived in poorhouses. One form of relief was exemption from taxation. The elderly and sick often received this assistance, which allowed them to remain in their homes. A number of cities also established soup houses in the first half of the nineteenth century.

=== Attitudes toward the poor ===
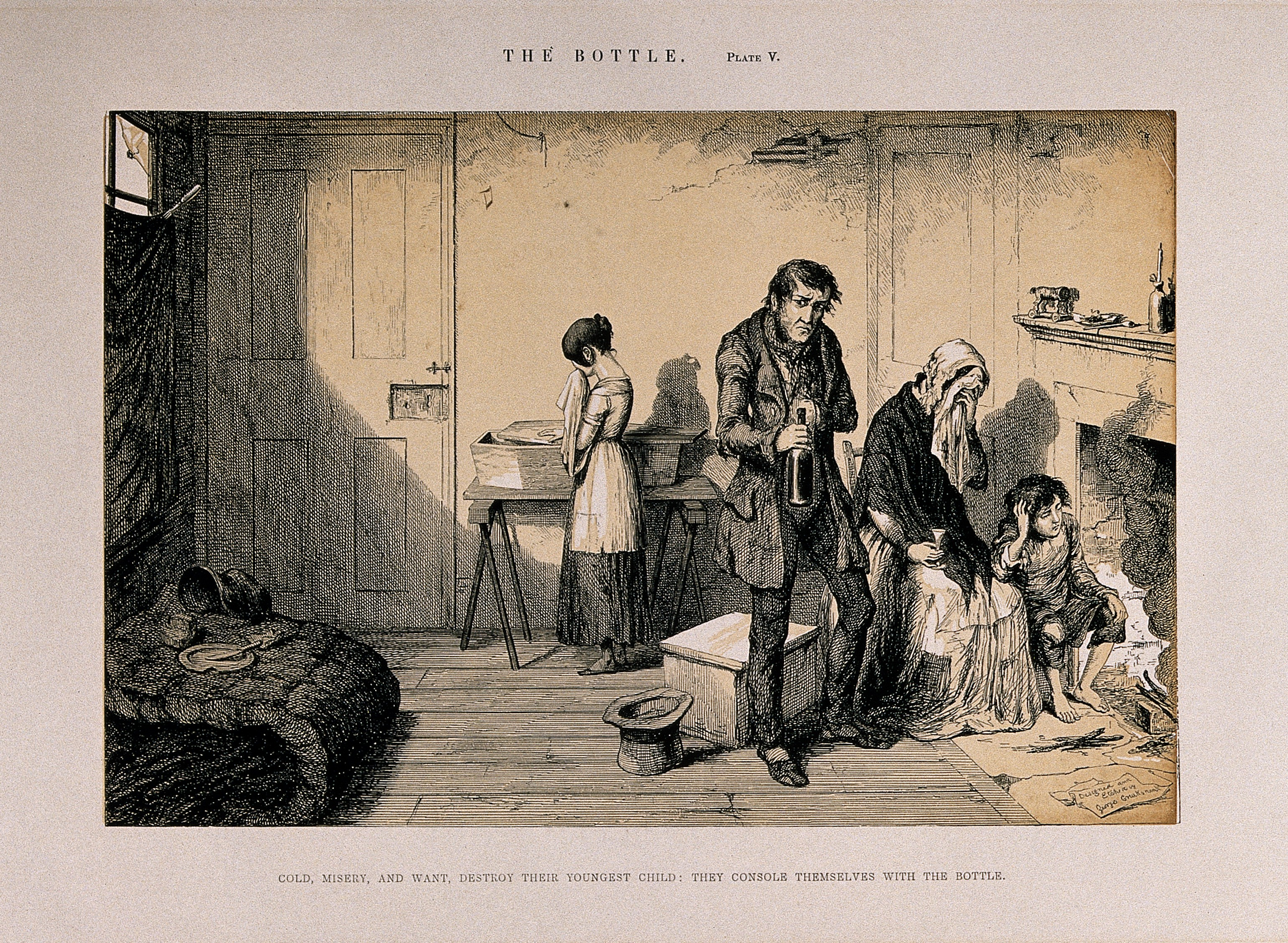
Intemperance and poverty propaganda, 1847

Public attitudes toward poverty in the nineteenth century were shaped by ideas about work, character, and personal responsibility. Common beliefs in the early 1800s held that poverty reflected a lack of character and was an individual moral failing—the result of laziness, vice, or alcoholism rather than misfortune, as had often been assumed in the colonial era. Many Americans believed that the country offered abundant opportunities for success, and they often viewed poverty as the result of personal shortcomings such as idleness, drunkenness, or immoral behavior.

Many taxpayers believed that public relief encouraged idleness and dependency, and reformers frequently distinguished between the “deserving” and “undeserving” poor. Urbanization and immigration also influenced these perceptions. In many cities officials blamed rising poverty on factors such as alcohol abuse, moral weakness, or the growing immigrant population. Some early poorhouses reflected these attitudes; a few were little more than rudimentary shelters intended simply to keep residents alive. In Richmond, Virginia, for example, the language used by city officials in the 1850s revealed increasingly harsh attitudes toward the poor and a growing reluctance to spend public funds on relief.

=== The rise of poorhouses ===
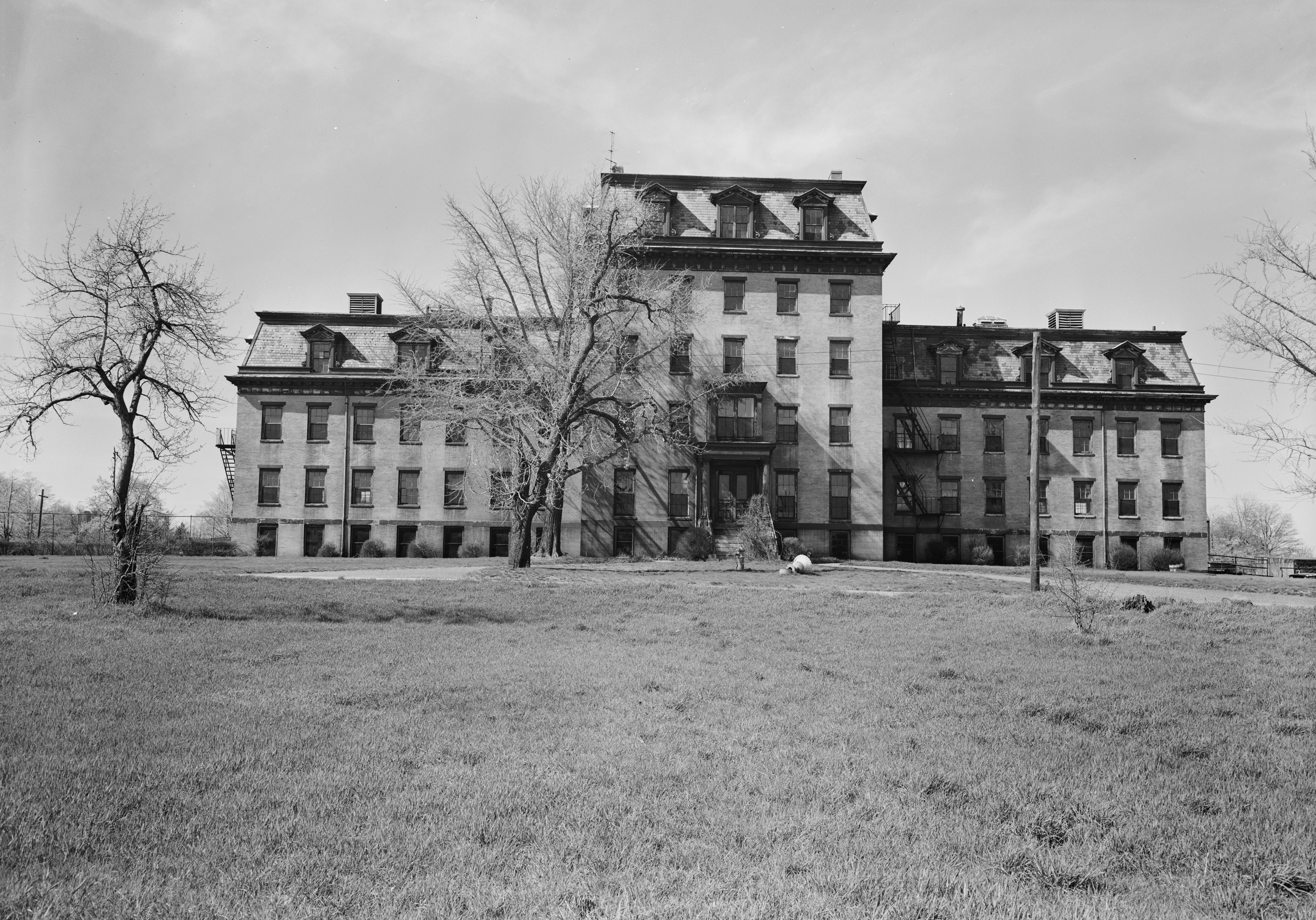
Dexter Asylum, Rhode Island, 1830

During the early nineteenth century, concerns grew among public officials that poverty and the cost of poor relief were increasing. Investigations into local relief systems produced influential reform reports, most notably the Quincy Report in Massachusetts (1821) and the Yates Report in New York (1824). The Quincy Commission, headed by Boston mayor Josiah Quincy, was appointed to examine the administration of outdoor relief in Massachusetts. Its report argued that relief systems should distinguish between different types of paupers and identified two broad groups: those incapable of work—such as the aged, the infirm, children, and the mentally disabled—and those considered able-bodied. The commission recommended expanding the use of institutional relief through almshouses and poorhouses rather than relying primarily on outdoor assistance.

The Yates Report (1824), authored by New York Secretary of State John Yates, was a detailed survey of poverty and public relief in the state. The report strongly criticized outdoor relief and advocated the creation of county poorhouses where the indigent could be supported under supervision. Yates similarly distinguished between two categories of the destitute: the permanent poor, who required long-term public support, and the temporary poor, who needed assistance only during periods of hardship.

Both reports helped shape early nineteenth-century reform thinking. Reformers argued that outdoor relief encouraged dependency and that institutional care would allow officials to supervise the poor while reducing public expenditures. They also believed poorhouses could eliminate older practices such as auctioning paupers to the lowest bidder or transferring poor individuals between towns. The influence of these reports contributed to a widespread movement to establish almshouses and county poorhouses, particularly in the northeastern United States. During the early and mid-nineteenth century, institutional relief expanded rapidly as urban growth and industrialization made poverty more visible. Immigration also contributed to rising numbers of people requiring assistance.

Municipalities responsible for supporting the poor typically relied on a combination of outdoor relief and institutional care depending on the needs of the community. The construction of poorhouses was often motivated less by humanitarian concerns than by efforts to reduce the cost of poor relief. In a largely rural country, many towns and counties built these institutions on farms, where agricultural production could help offset expenses. Conditions varied widely from county to county and state to state. Some states developed extensive systems of county institutions; in Ohio, for example, nearly every county operated a poor farm. In other parts of the country such institutions were far less common, and relief was often provided through other means.

=== Conditions and daily life ===
==== Resident populations ====
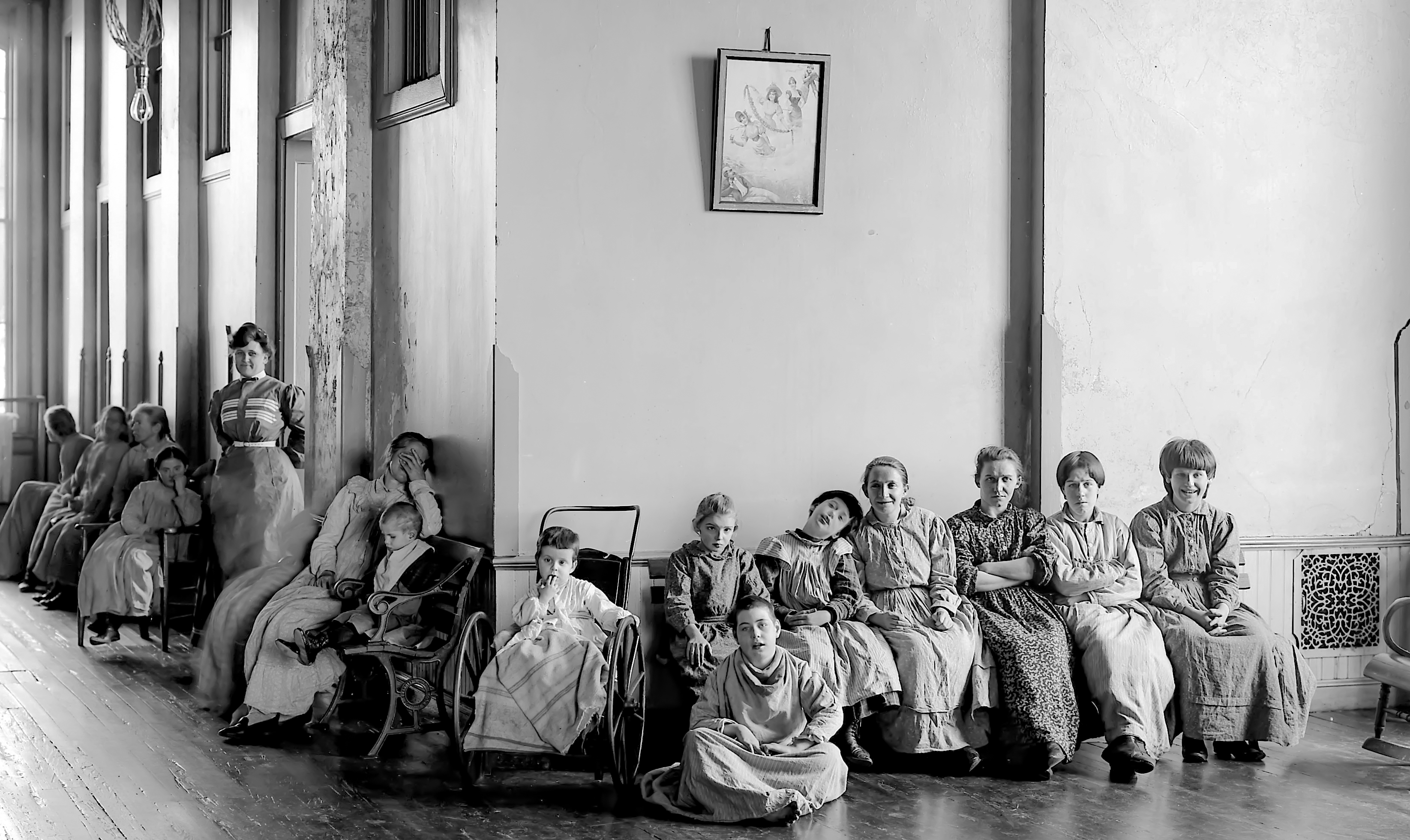
Poorhouse residents, St Louis, 1904

Many poorhouse residents entered these institutions because illness, disability, or old age left them unable to support themselves. Historians have noted that illness was a major cause of destitution among families receiving relief, and a large proportion of almshouse inmates were sick or physically debilitated. Elderly people were particularly vulnerable; without children to care for them or savings for support, many found themselves completely destitute.

Lengths of stay varied widely. Some residents entered poorhouses only temporarily during periods of hardship, while others—especially the elderly or chronically ill—remained for many years. Poorhouses therefore functioned both as temporary shelter and as long-term homes for those unable to support themselves. Poorhouses housed a wide range of people, including the elderly, the sick, single mothers, abused wives, transients, disabled individuals, orphans, and families facing illness or sudden hardship. In an era when few alternative institutions were available, poorhouses sometimes provided shelter for people in crisis. Women occasionally entered these institutions to give birth, and historians have noted that they often functioned informally as maternity facilities for women without family support. Poor farms also sometimes served as places where women experiencing family violence could seek protection.

During the late nineteenth century, men were more likely than women to live in poorhouses. Women were often supported by family members, and some forms of public assistance were available to widows and mothers. Historians have noted that African Americans were often underrepresented in poorhouse registers. Racial discrimination in access to public services meant that many Black Americans relied instead on family networks, churches, or segregated charitable institutions rather than county poor farms.

==== Work and daily routine ====
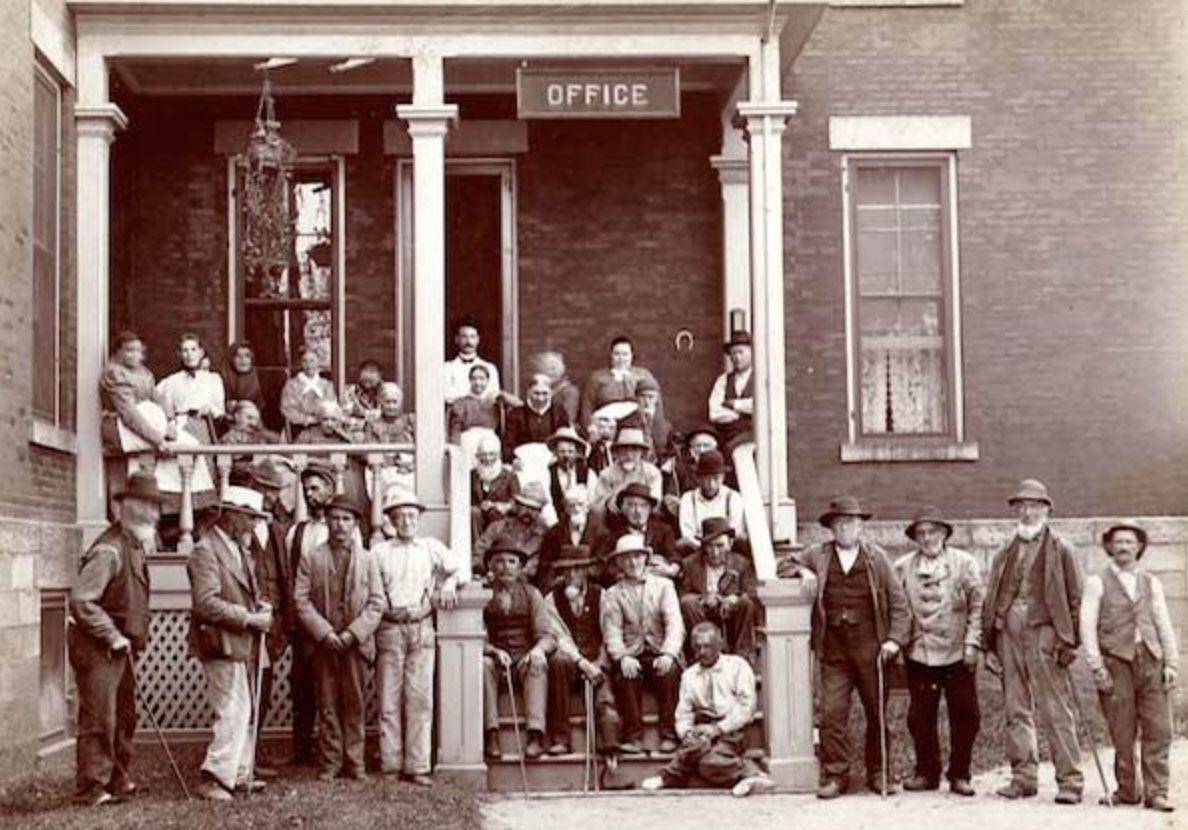
Poorhouse residents, Albion, NY, 1904

Living arrangements in poorhouses were typically communal. Residents often shared rooms or slept in dormitory-style quarters and typically ate meals together at scheduled times. Some institutions maintained separate dining rooms for men and women. Many institutions expected able-bodied residents to perform light indoor or outdoor work. Some poorhouses also used cottage-style layouts that separated residents by family group, gender, or race. Residents were provided with basic clothing. Uniforms were uncommon, and some residents assisted with sewing, mending, or laundry work within the institution.

Most poor farm residents were already elderly, ill, or physically incapable of regular labor when they entered the institution. Those who were able to support themselves typically remained only briefly, often leaving once work became available or their circumstances improved. By the 1920s, only about 7 percent of poor farm residents were physically capable of working, and only a small portion of them—around 12 percent—remained in the institution for a year or longer.

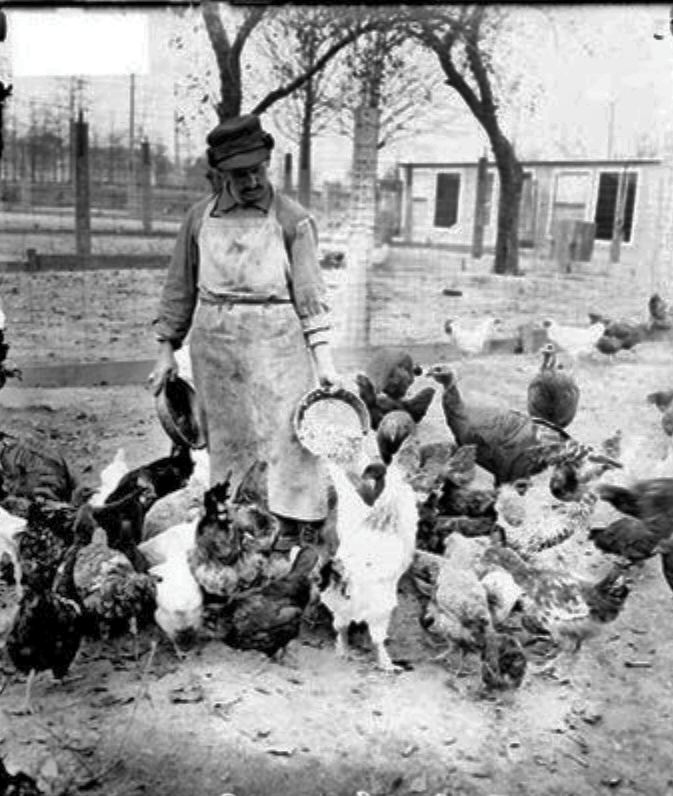
Cook County Poor Farm, 1914

Institutions usually imposed strict rules governing work and behavior. Men and women were often housed separately, and administrators attempted to regulate daily routines through schedules and supervision. Although poorhouse residents were not legally prisoners and could often leave voluntarily, administrators frequently struggled to maintain order and discipline within the institutions. Residents were expected to contribute labor whenever possible, performing tasks such as cooking, cleaning, sewing, gardening, or caring for other residents. Women commonly carried out domestic work such as spinning, weaving, and sewing, while men were assigned agricultural labor or maintenance tasks. In larger institutions residents often supervised work assignments or assisted staff in overseeing daily tasks.

Many American poorhouses functioned as institutional farms intended to provide food and basic goods for the institution. Able-bodied residents were often assigned agricultural work, raising livestock and cultivating crops used for meals or livestock feed. In some institutions residents also produced household goods such as soap and clothing used within the poorhouse. Most poor farms employed a matron who supervised domestic work, managed food preparation and clothing, and oversaw the daily care of residents. Although poorhouses carried social stigma, residents were not always isolated from their communities. Local visitors sometimes brought food and newspapers occasionally reported on events at the institutions.

==== Living conditions ====
Life in American poorhouses was often harsh. These locally-run institutions were typically designed to be "spartan and uncomfortable" as a way to incentivize the value of having the poor work themselves out of poverty. These conditions bolstered the perception that available public services catering to poor, dependent children, are "barren and stigmatized." As such, there came increased reliance on privately-run institutions like orphanages for temporary childcare.

Conditions were especially severe for residents with mental illness. Before the development of specialized hospitals and asylums, poorhouses frequently confined mentally ill individuals in rudimentary cells or outbuildings and provided little medical care. Some residents were restrained with chains or subjected to corporal punishment. Visitors and staff sometimes reported that the wards used for mentally ill residents were poorly ventilated, unsanitary, and infested with pests. Conditions varied widely from institution to institution, but nineteenth-century reports frequently described overcrowding, inadequate staffing, and poor-quality food. Investigations and grand jury inspections sometimes criticized institutional management, noting limited diets, insufficient clothing, and unsanitary wards. An 1850s New York legislative report described some residents as poorly clothed and suffering from hunger. Former inmates and reformers reported abuse by attendants or other forms of mistreatment, prompting public inquiries and legislative investigations.

=== Poorhouse reforms ===
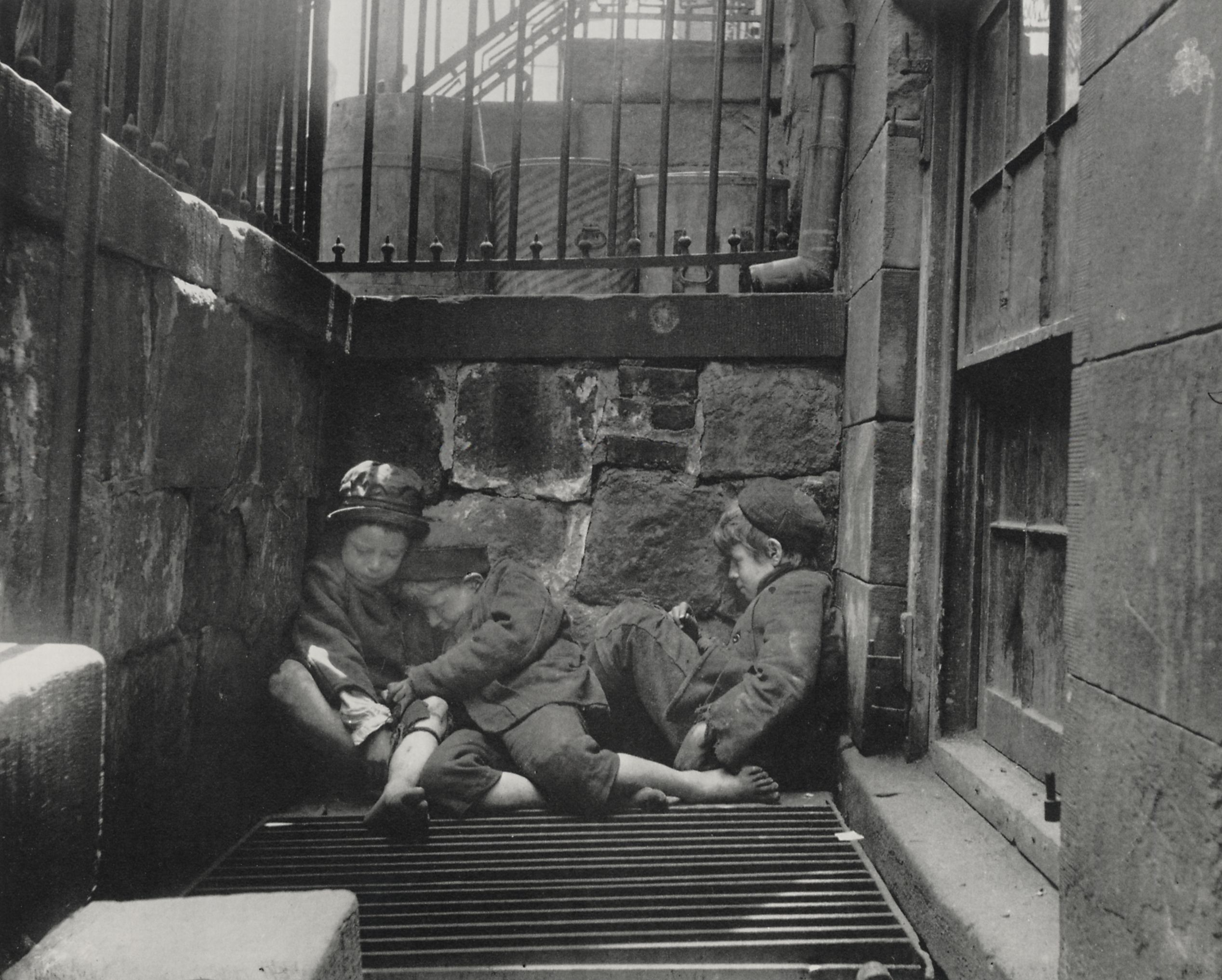
Sleeping homeless children, New York City, 1890s

By the late nineteenth century, there was growing recognition that poorhouses housed a wide range of dependent groups—including children, the mentally ill, and the elderly—under the same conditions. Reformers increasingly criticized this practice, arguing that such institutions indiscriminately mixed able-bodied residents with widows, the elderly, the infirm, and children, and failed to provide appropriate care for any group.

==== Children ====
Reformers also emphasized a growing public responsibility for dependent children. Children formed one of the largest groups among the neglected and needy during the nineteenth century. Large families were common, and many children were left orphaned or without adequate support, particularly after the Civil War. Because they were seen as innocent victims of circumstance rather than responsible for their poverty, reformers increasingly viewed children as among the most deserving recipients of assistance.

In the post-Civil War period, several states developed different approaches to removing children from poorhouses, reflecting differing views on cost and church-state relations. In the midwest, states like Minnesota, Colorado, and Massachusetts established public orphanages called "state schools" like the State Public School at Coldwater which temporarily housed children before placing them out with nearby families. Another approach was adopted in Ohio and Cincinnati where local governments did not create new orphanages but instead opted to pay to place children in preexisting institutions. The last approach was followed by New York where legislatures earmarked tax dollars to subsidize orphanages, which were mostly private, faith-based organizations, in the interest of fiscal efficiency.

Beginning in the 1870s, reform launched campaigns to remove children from poorhouses and place them in orphanages, foster homes, or private family settings. These efforts contributed to the rapid expansion of orphanages in the late nineteenth century. They formed part of a growing child-welfare reform movement that sought to remove dependent, neglected, and delinquent children from almshouses and other institutions and provide more specialized care. Reformers also promoted related measures such as juvenile courts and probation systems, mothers’ pensions, compulsory school attendance laws, and campaigns against child labor.

==== Mental illness ====
Concerns about the treatment of mentally ill residents became an important focus of reform. Social reformer Dorothea Dix toured poorhouses in the 1840s and documented the poor conditions in which many people with mental illness and disabilities were confined. In some institutions she found individuals confined in cold rooms or chained in their cells. Her widely publicized reports helped draw attention to the conditions inside poorhouses and encouraged the establishment of specialized state institutions for people with mental illness as well as facilities for the deaf, blind, and other disabled populations.

Investigations into poorhouse conditions often focused on the treatment of residents with mental illness. Reports of neglect and abuse contributed to growing support for removing psychiatric patients from poorhouses and placing them in specialized institutions.

==== Creation of specialized institutions ====
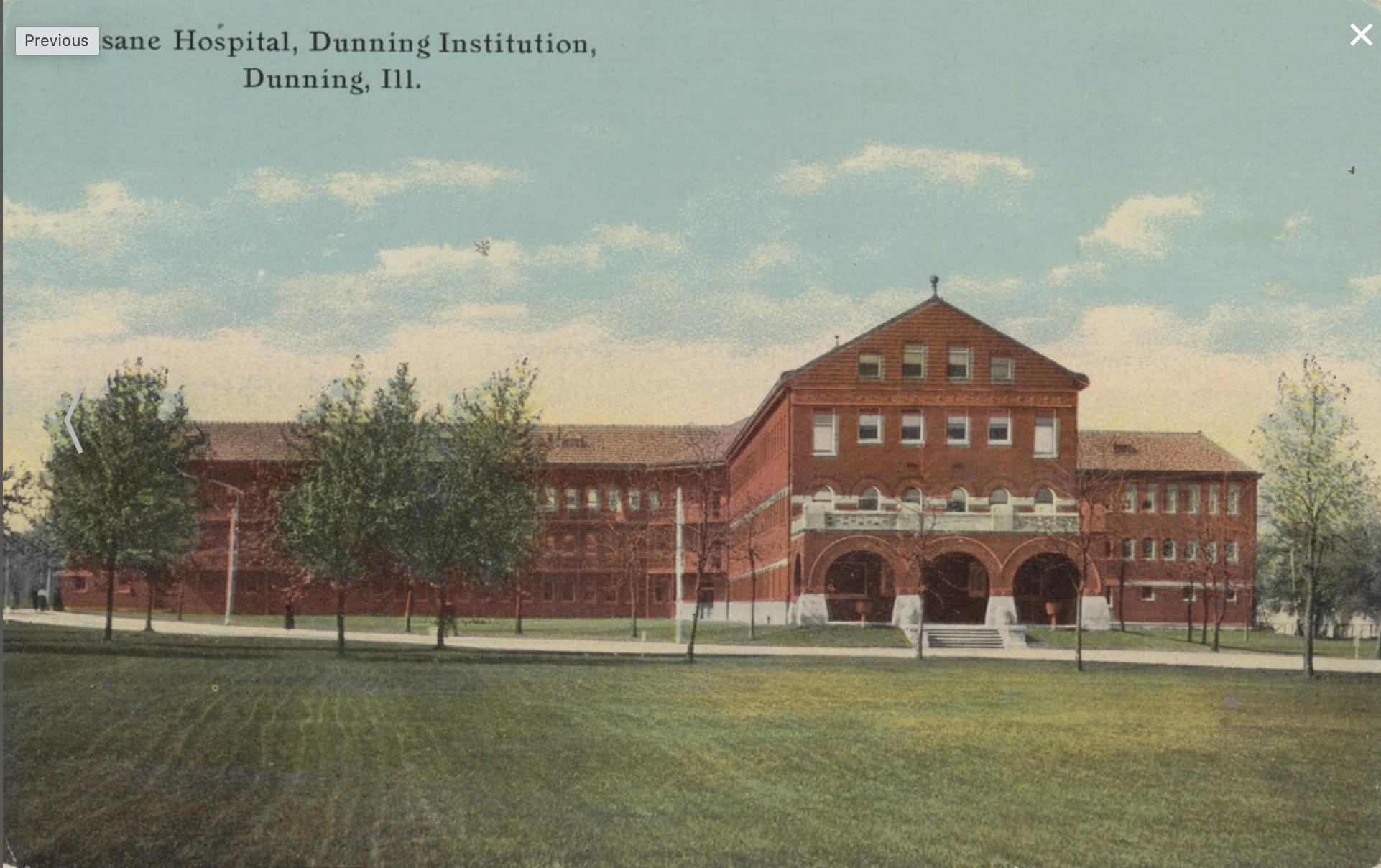
Dunning, Illinois Insane Hospital, 1900

During the nineteenth century, reformers increasingly advocated separating different dependent populations into specialized institutions. States and charitable organizations established facilities for groups such as the blind, deaf, and mentally ill, gradually reducing the number of people housed in poorhouses and altering the institutions’ role within the American welfare system.

State governments increasingly assumed responsibility for the care of people with mental illness by establishing public asylums. By 1880, at least seventy-five state mental asylums had been created across the United States. A major milestone occurred with New York’s State Care Act of 1890, which transferred responsibility for indigent mentally ill people from local poorhouses to state hospitals and encouraged similar reforms elsewhere.

As maternity homes, hospitals, and other specialized institutions expanded, many younger residents were removed from poor farms. However, these facilities were often overcrowded, and poorhouses continued to house people whose families or governments could not place elsewhere. By the late nineteenth and early twentieth centuries, poorhouses increasingly functioned primarily as homes for the elderly, who often had no alternative institutions available.

=== Decline of the poorhouse system ===
During the nineteenth century poorhouses were the dominant institutions of public welfare in the United States. By the late nineteenth century more than 2,400 poorhouses operated across the country, housing a wide range of dependent populations.

Over time, however, the role of poorhouses began to change. During the late nineteenth and early twentieth centuries they gradually lost their central place in American systems of public relief as reformers removed particular groups to specialized institutions. State governments increasingly assumed responsibility for the care of the mentally ill, while charitable organizations expanded services for children and other vulnerable populations. As these changes progressed, many poorhouses came to function primarily as homes for the elderly rather than general relief institutions. The population of poorhouses also shifted during this period. By the early twentieth century the typical resident of a poor farm was a middle-aged or elderly laborer without family support. The growing number of older residents reflected both the expansion of direct relief programs and the continued absence of broader public health and pension systems.

At the same time, governments began experimenting with new forms of public assistance. Mothers’ pension laws allowed widowed or single mothers to remain at home with their children rather than placing them in institutions. During the 1920s some states also introduced programs such as old-age assistance and aid for the blind. Studies increasingly suggested that maintaining poor farms was an expensive form of relief, encouraging policymakers to consider alternative approaches.

=== Rise of modern welfare programs ===
The decline of poorhouses accelerated during the early twentieth century as federal and state governments expanded social welfare programs. Progressive-era reforms introduced new forms of public assistance, including mothers’ pensions and other direct aid programs. During the campaign leading to the Social Security Act of 1935, reformers frequently cited poorhouses and county homes as examples of the shortcomings of earlier relief systems and used them to argue for publicly funded old-age pensions. Public spending on welfare rose substantially during the early twentieth century. Total welfare expenditures increased from approximately $180 million in 1913 to about $750 million by 1929. Much of this funding supported institutional care, including more than 70,000 people living in roughly 2,000 poor farms and almshouses. The 1910s and 1920s marked both a peak in welfare spending and the largest number of poor farms in operation. During the same period welfare administration became more centralized and professionalized as county and state welfare boards gradually replaced the earlier system of locally managed poor farms.

Despite increasing demand for relief during the Great Depression, the number of poor farms declined rapidly during the 1930s. Financial pressures and the expansion of state and federal assistance programs encouraged local officials to close institutions or reorganize them in order to qualify for outside funding. Because residents of poor farms were generally not eligible for federal benefits under the Social Security Act, counties often converted these institutions into hospitals or nursing homes.

The effects of Social Security were quickly visible in many communities. In some counties poor farm populations fell sharply during the late 1930s and 1940s as elderly residents began receiving pensions. However, institutional care did not disappear entirely; roughly half of elderly poor farm residents who applied for Social Security assistance received benefits, and many communities continued to rely on institutional care for people who could not be supported elsewhere. At the same time, the expansion of federal welfare funding encouraged counties to transform poor farm properties into public nursing homes or long-term care facilities, often using the same buildings or sites that had previously housed the poor farms. Earlier welfare reforms had already reduced the number of women and children entering these institutions, as mothers’ aid programs and other forms of direct assistance increasingly allowed families to remain in their own homes.

=== Closure of poor farms ===
The Social Security Act of 1935 marked a major turning point in American public welfare by establishing national programs for old-age pensions and unemployment insurance. These reforms reduced reliance on locally administered poorhouses, and by the mid-twentieth century many had disappeared or were converted into county nursing homes or other social service institutions.

By this time, the remaining residents of poor farms were often individuals who required long-term institutional care, including adults with disabilities and others who could not easily be supported elsewhere. Although some institutions continued to operate for several decades, poor farms declined steadily after World War II. The last poor farms generally closed or were converted to nursing homes during the 1960s and early 1970s. Some individual institutions survived longer than others; for example, the Lewiston City Farm remained in operation until 1967.

Today poor farm cemeteries are often the most visible surviving traces of these institutions. In many communities counties have preserved these burial grounds and installed markers or memorials to commemorate former residents.

== Canada ==
=== Colonial foundations of poor relief ===
Early in Canadian history, governments played a supporting role in providing poor relief. Responsibility for assistance largely rested with families, religious institutions, private charitable organizations, and local communities. Approaches to poor relief in the territories that later became Canada varied according to colonial administration. In New France, charitable assistance was organized largely through the Catholic Church, with financial support from the French colonial government. Religious institutions established hospitals and charitable homes that provided care for the destitute, elderly, and sick. As in many early modern welfare systems, assistance distinguished between the “deserving” and “undeserving” poor, with widows, abandoned wives, and the infirm generally considered deserving of aid.

==== New France ====
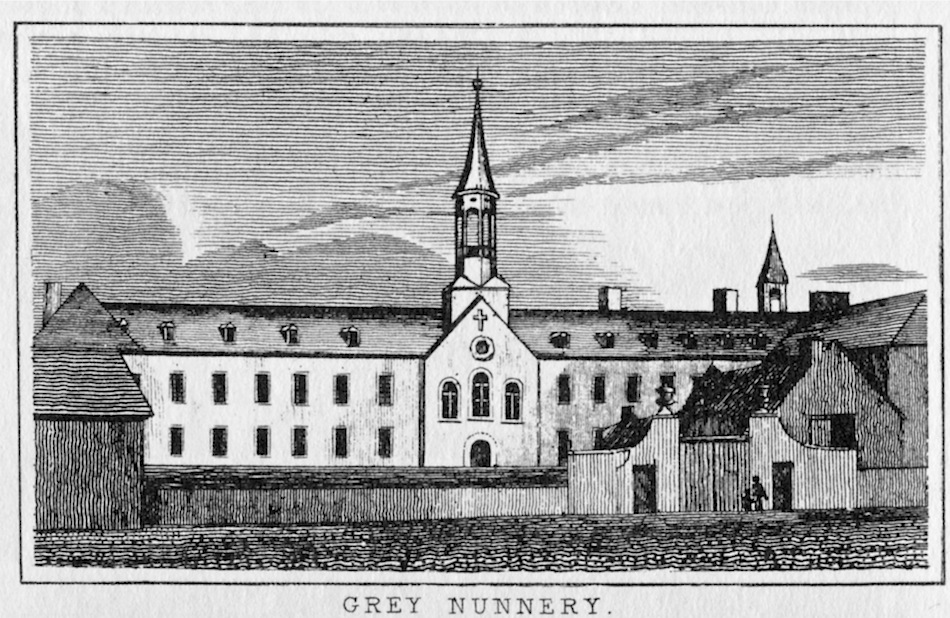
Montreal Grey Nunnery, 1839

New France was the name used for France’s colonial possessions in North America, which originally included Canada, Acadia, Newfoundland, and Louisiana. In colonial New France, charitable assistance was organized largely through Catholic religious orders, with financial support from the French colonial government. These communities established hospitals and charitable homes that cared for the destitute, elderly, and sick. Women’s orders also cared for orphans, abandoned women, the mentally ill, and the aged, and founded some of the earliest hospitals near Quebec in the mid-seventeenth century. As in many early modern welfare systems, assistance distinguished between the “deserving” and “undeserving” poor, with widows, abandoned wives, and the infirm generally considered deserving of aid. Before 1688, the only direct assistance provided by the state to those considered deserving of charity was a license permitting them to beg.

==== British Colonies ====
Systems of poor relief in eighteenth-century British North America varied widely from colony to colony. Nova Scotia and New Brunswick adopted legislation influenced by the English Poor Laws, placing responsibility for supporting the indigent on local parishes or townships. Nova Scotia enacted poor law legislation in 1763 and New Brunswick followed in 1786. These systems used residency requirements to determine eligibility for assistance, although in practice relief was often limited and uneven. In some communities the care of impoverished residents was contracted to private households rather than provided through permanent institutions.

Other colonies did not adopt formal poor law systems. In Prince Edward Island the English Poor Law was never fully implemented, largely because of the island’s small population and the absence of municipal government outside the towns of Charlottetown and Summerside. In Upper Canada colonial authorities also resisted adopting poor law legislation, believing it impractical in a largely agrarian economy and assuming that able-bodied settlers could support themselves through available land and employment. In these regions, assistance was usually provided informally through families, churches, and voluntary charity, while local jails sometimes served as makeshift shelters for the homeless or mentally ill.

The situation differed again in Newfoundland and Lower Canada. In Newfoundland, where early settlement was limited and administrative structures remained weak, responsibility for poor relief fell largely to the colonial government and local charitable initiatives rather than to a formal poor-law system. In Lower Canada, the French Catholic tradition of assigning responsibility for health, education, and welfare to religious institutions continued after the British conquest, and charitable assistance remained largely organized through the Church.

=== Attitudes towards the poor ===
In New France before 1688, the only direct assistance the state provided to those considered deserving of charity was permission to beg. Alms-seekers were often treated sympathetically by local residents, who tended to view poverty as the result of misfortune rather than deliberate idleness. Women made up a large proportion of those receiving aid; by the late seventeenth century, about two-thirds of alms recipients in Montreal were women, most of them widows or abandoned wives.

At the same time, as elsewhere in colonial North America, attitudes toward poverty were influenced by ideas of personal responsibility and self-reliance. Relief was generally limited to those regarded as the “deserving poor,” such as the elderly, sick, or disabled, while able-bodied individuals were expected to work, and measures such as residency and work requirements were used to restrict access to aid. Many communities offered outdoor relief, which provided modest amounts of food, fuel, clothing, or money while allowing recipients to remain in their own homes.

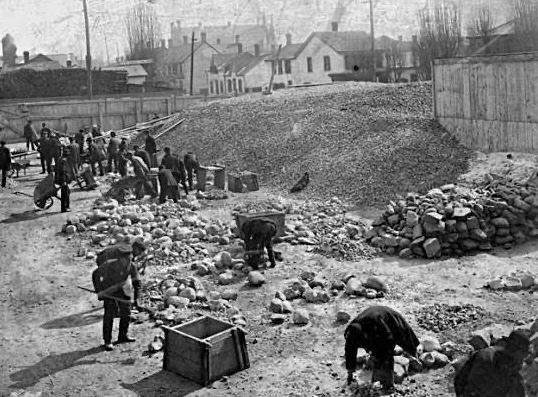
Residents breaking stones, House of Industry, c.1900

=== Houses of Industry and early institutional relief ===
Changes to the English Poor Law in 1834 sharply restricted the use of outdoor relief in Britain and emphasized institutional care through workhouses, where the poor were housed and expected to perform labor until they could support themselves. These reforms quickly influenced social policy in British North America. Beginning in the late 1830s, municipalities in several cities established institutions known as Houses of Industry, commonly referred to as poorhouses or workhouses. They provided food and shelter to people who needed public assistance. Residents, including children and the elderly, were usually expected to work either within the institution or for private employers. In 1837 legislation authorized municipalities to levy taxes on ratable property to finance the construction of such institutions.

=== Poor relief in nineteenth-century Canada ===
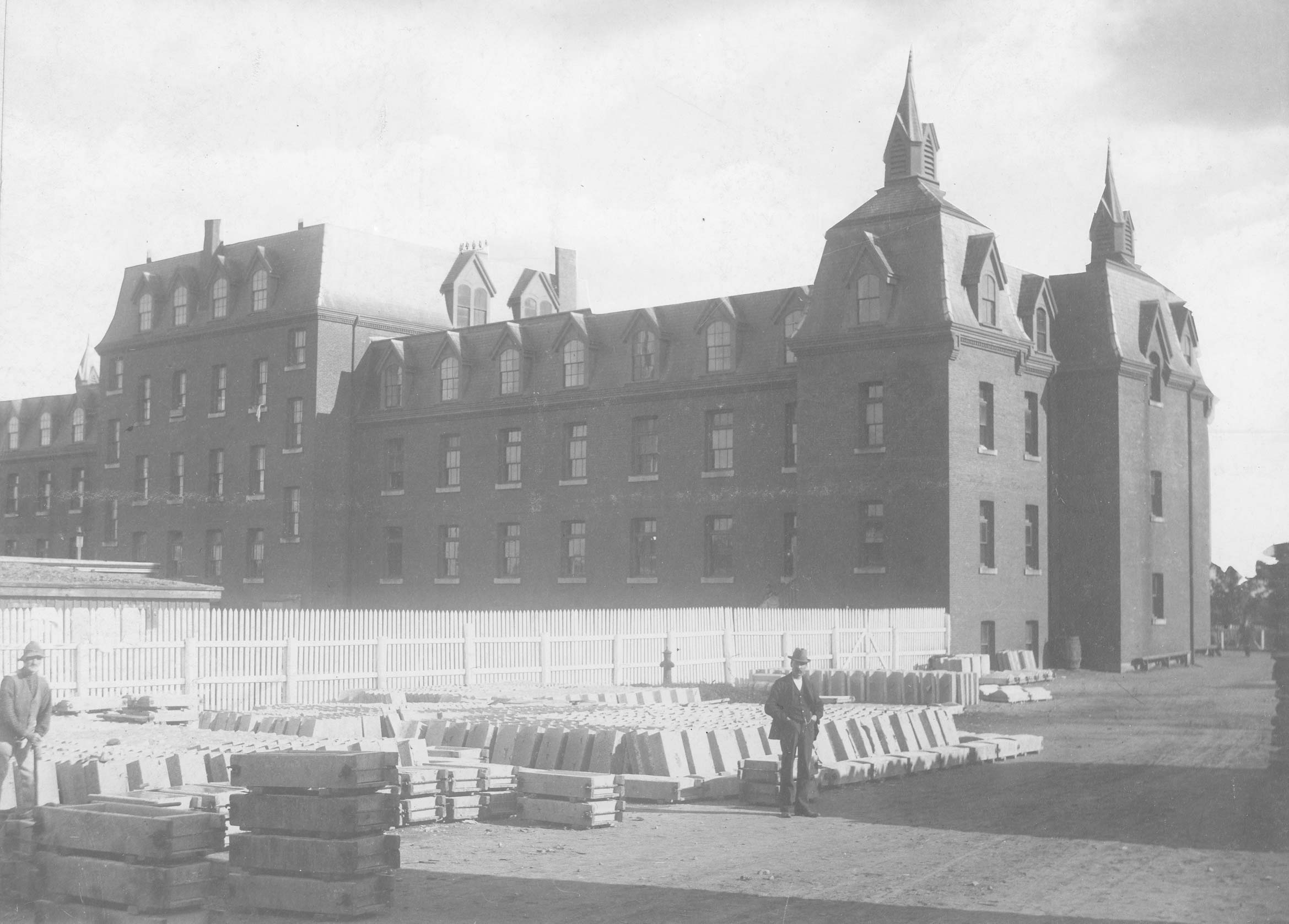
Halifax Poor Asylum, 1899

By the mid-nineteenth century, systems of poor relief became more structured as government institutions developed in British North America. After the union of Upper and Lower Canada in 1840 and the creation of the Dominion of Canada in 1867, a mixed system of welfare provision emerged. Poor relief was delivered through municipal institutions such as Houses of Industry, as well as through voluntary and religious charities and specialized institutions including hospitals and asylums. As government institutions expanded, approaches to poor relief also evolved.

By the 1850s many Houses of Industry increasingly housed single destitute men, while families, the elderly, and the mentally ill were more often directed toward charitable assistance or specialized institutions. By the late nineteenth century, criticism of conditions in workhouses and Houses of Industry led to greater reliance on outdoor relief, particularly for families.

=== Transition to modern welfare programs ===
In the early twentieth century, Canadian governments gradually expanded their role in social welfare as industrialization, urbanization, and economic instability increased demands for public assistance. Provincial governments introduced early welfare programs such as workers’ compensation and mothers’ allowances, reflecting a growing acceptance that governments should provide social support. Early cash assistance programs were directed toward groups considered especially deserving, particularly children without fathers and elderly people. Mothers’ allowances provided financial support to single mothers and their children, while old-age pensions offered assistance to impoverished seniors.

After the hardships of the Great Depression and the Second World War, Canada developed a more comprehensive welfare system. Beginning in the mid-twentieth century, federal and provincial governments introduced national and provincial social assistance programs that provided a financial safety net for people living in poverty.

=== Closure of poorhouses ===
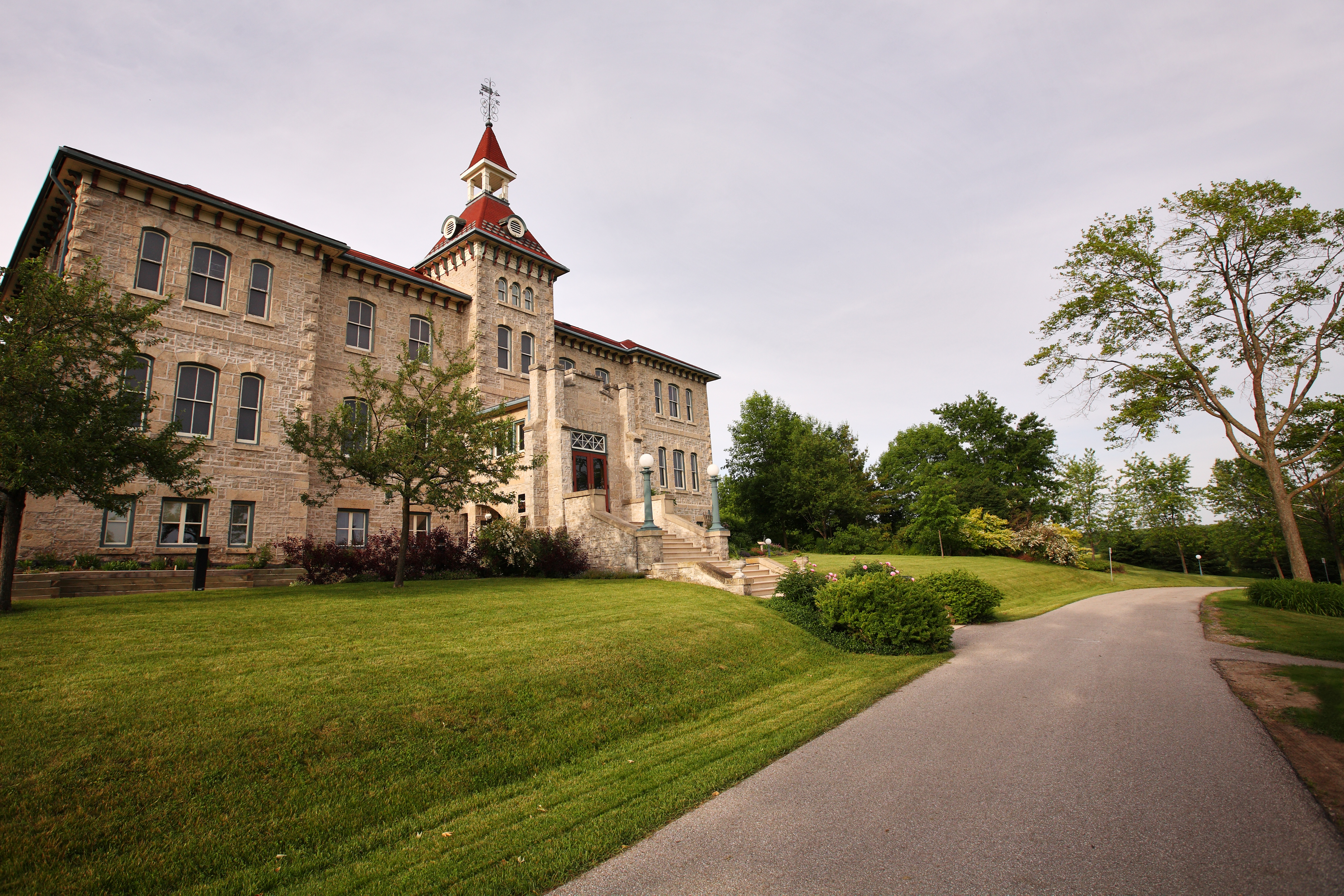
Wellington County Museum, Ontario, 2009

The expansion of modern welfare programs during the mid-twentieth century gradually reduced reliance on institutions such as Houses of Industry and poorhouses. Federal legislation such as the Unemployment Assistance Act of 1956 supported the growth of publicly funded assistance programs across Canada.

As these programs expanded, several provinces—including Nova Scotia and New Brunswick—closed their remaining poorhouses, while others converted them into homes for the aged or other social service institutions. By the mid-twentieth century, institutional poor relief had largely been replaced by welfare programs administered by provincial and federal governments.

Some surviving buildings have been preserved as historic sites. One example is the Wellington County House of Industry and Refuge in Ontario, opened in 1877, which later operated as a home for the aged before becoming a museum.

== Gallery of poorhouse residents ==
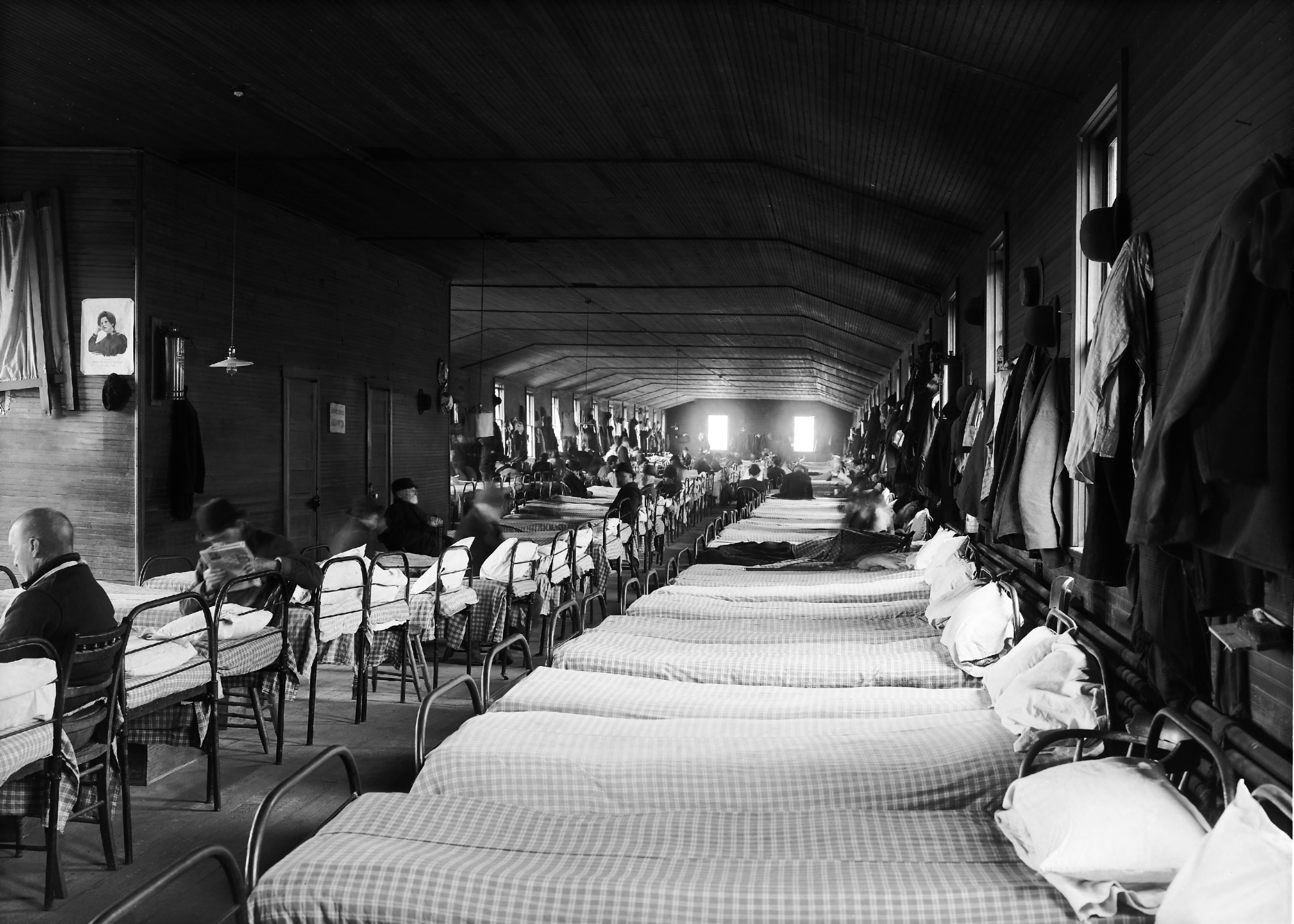
Male Pauper Barracks, St. Louis Poor House,1904

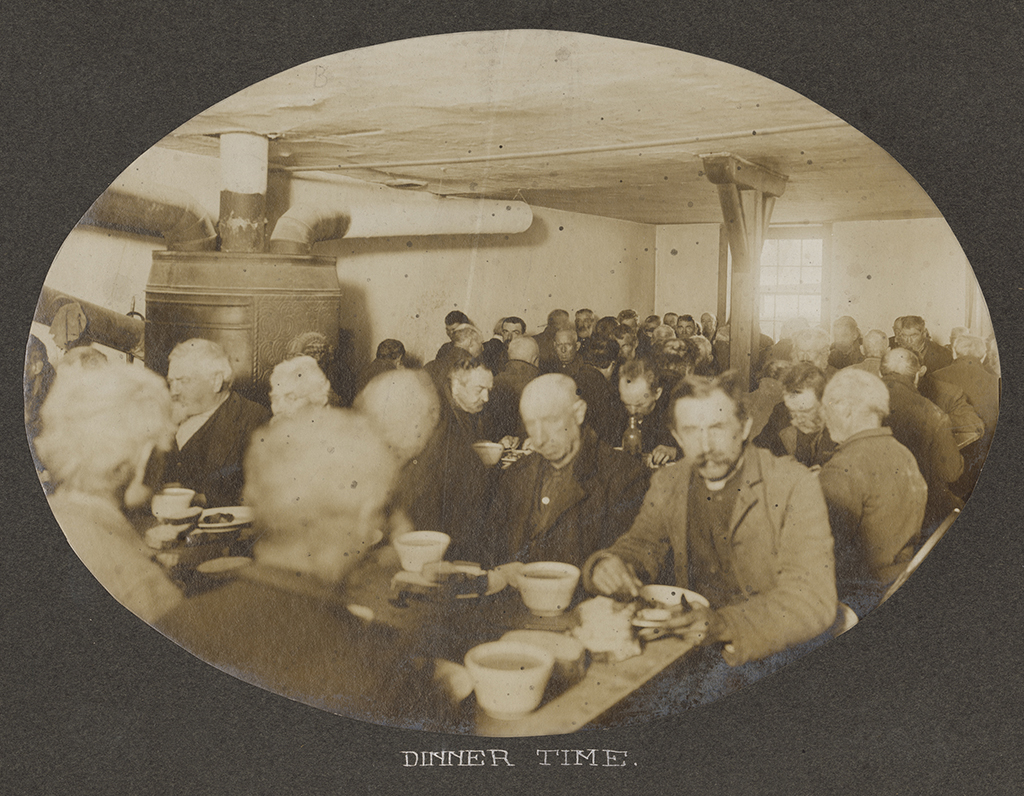
New York City Farm Colony, meal time, 1904

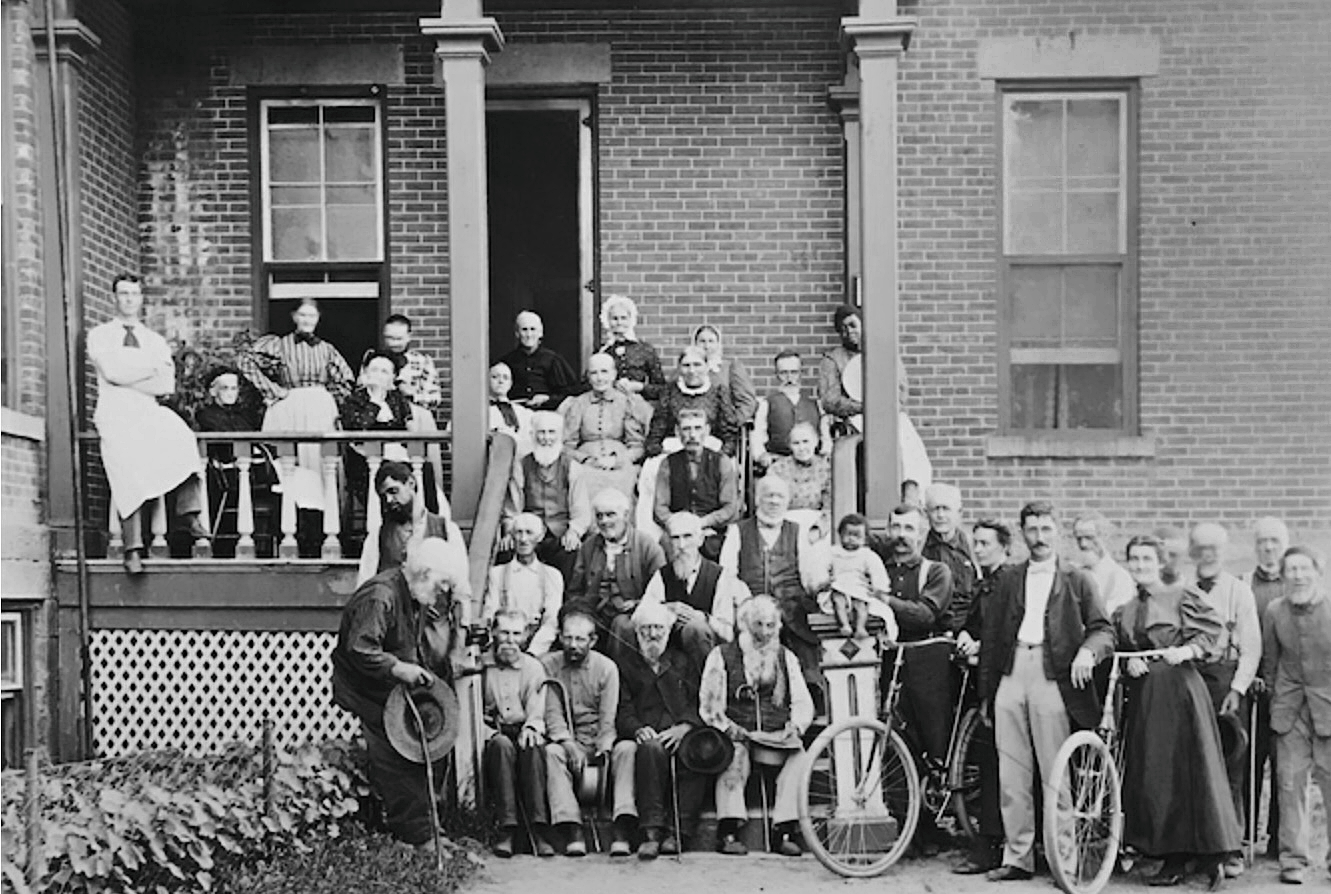
Poorhouse residents, Albion, NY, 1904

== See also ==
- Almshouse
- Low income housing
- Scottish poorhouse
- Homeless shelter
- History of poverty in the United Kingdom
- History of poverty in the United States
- Toronto House of Industry
- Wellington County House of Industry and Refuge
- Cook County Poor Farm, Illinois
- Mothers' pensions

== Sources ==
- Birk, Megan (2022). The Fundamental Institution: Poverty, Social Welfare, and Agriculture in American Poor Farms. University of Illinois Press. ISBN 978-0252044380.
- Finkel, Alvin (2012). Social Policy and Practice in Canada: A History. Wilfrid Laurier University Press. ISBN 978-1554588862.
- Green, Elna C. (2003). This Business of Relief. University of Georgia Press. ISBN 978-0820324517.
- Guest, Dennis (2001). The Emergence of Social Security in Canada. UBC Press. ISBN 978-0774805513.
- Hasci, Timothy (1997). Second Home: Orphan Asylums and Poor Families in America. Harvard University Press. ISBN 978-0674796447.
- Himmelfarb, Gertrude (1983). The Idea of Poverty:England in the Early Industrial Age. Alfred A. Knopf. ISBN 978-0394530628.
- Katz, Michael B. (1996). In the Shadow of the Poorhouse: A Social History of Welfare in America. HarperCollins. p. 2nd. ISBN 978-0465032105.
- Robbenhaar, Madeline E. a. (2025). Poverty Policy: Historic Institutional Approaches to Poor Relief in Canada (Master's thesis). University of Alberta.
- Trattner, Walter I. (2007). From Poor Law To Welfare State: A History of Social Welfare in America (6th ed.). New York: Free Press. ISBN 978-1416593188.
- Wagner, David (2005). The Poorhouse: America's Forgotten Institution. New York: Rowman & Littlefield. ISBN 978-0742529458.
