= Wellington County House of Industry and Refuge =

National Historic Site of Canada

- Refuge pour les pauvres du Comté de Wellington
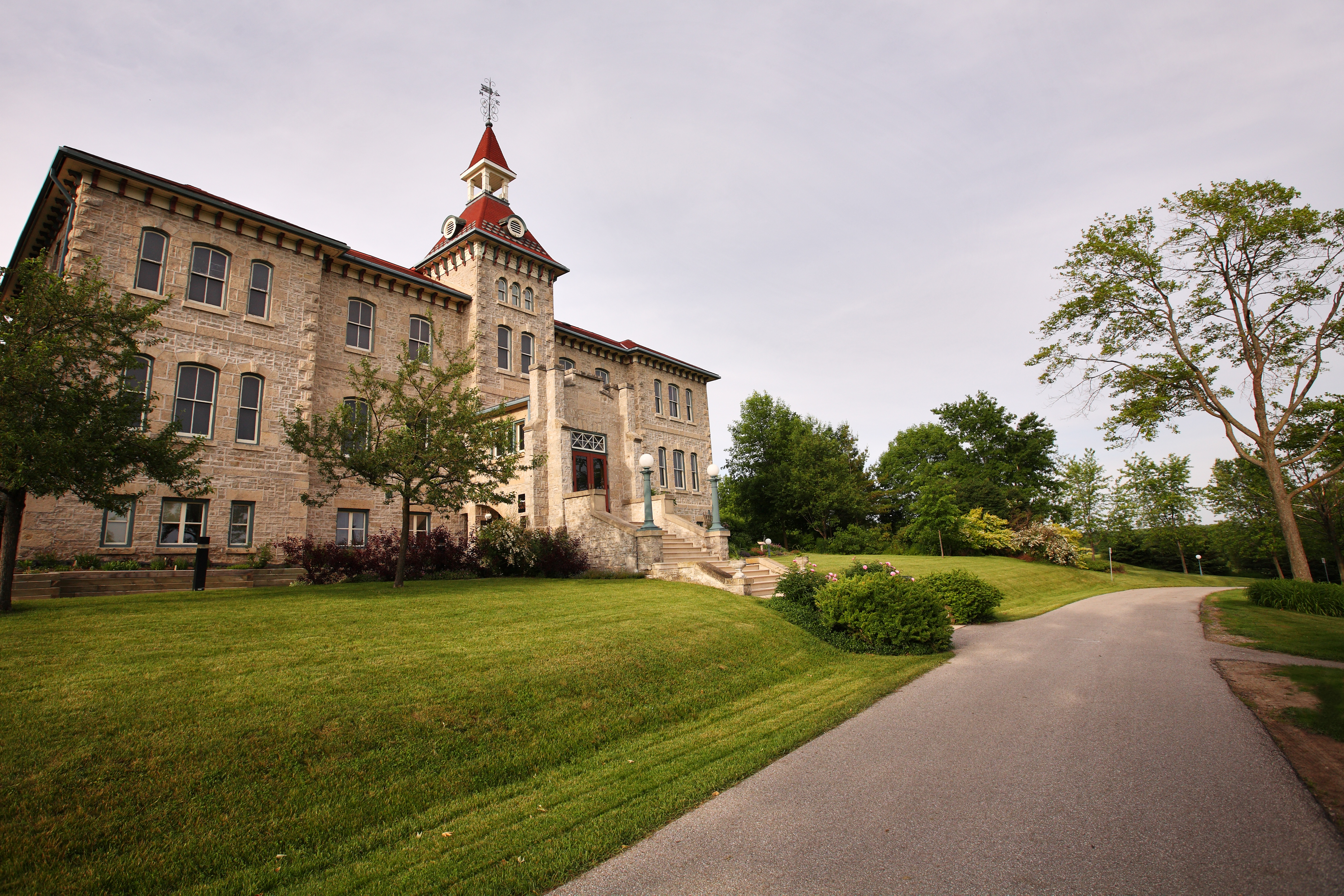
- The main building as of 2009
- Interactive map of Wellington County House of Industry and Refuge
- 43°41′35″N 80°23′59″W

History
- Built: 1876–1877
- Built for: Wellington County Council

Site notes
- Area: Fergus, Ontario, Canada
- Architect(s): Victor Stewart, C. J. Soule, John Taylor
- Architectural style: Italianate

National Historic Site of Canada
- Designated: 1995

The Wellington County House of Industry and Refuge, located in Fergus, Ontario, is the oldest surviving state-supported poorhouse in Canada. Constructed in 1877, the site operated as a poorhouse and farm until 1947, and as an old age home until 1971. In the 1980s, the building was repurposed to house the Wellington County Museum and Archives. The Wellington County House of Industry and Refuge was designated a National Historic Site of Canada in 1995 based on its illustration of 19th century attitudes towards poverty and the origins of Canada's social safety net.

== History ==
During the middle to late 19th century, Ontario's transition from a predominantly agricultural to an industrialized economy left many residents, particularly the elderly, in precarious financial positions. Following pressure from a citizen's committee, the House of Industry Act was passed by the provincial legislature in 1837, officially establishing institutions that would provide assistance for the poor and ill who were unable to support themselves, as well as able-bodied indigents — provided that they were "diligently employed in labour". The Municipal Institutions Act of 1866 required all counties with populations above 20,000 to construct such institutions, but this decision was strongly opposed and an 1867 amendment negated this requirement. Only nine poorhouses were established under this legislation: the Wellington County House of Industry was the fourth and the oldest still standing, as well as the only surviving poorhouse constructed prior to 1903.

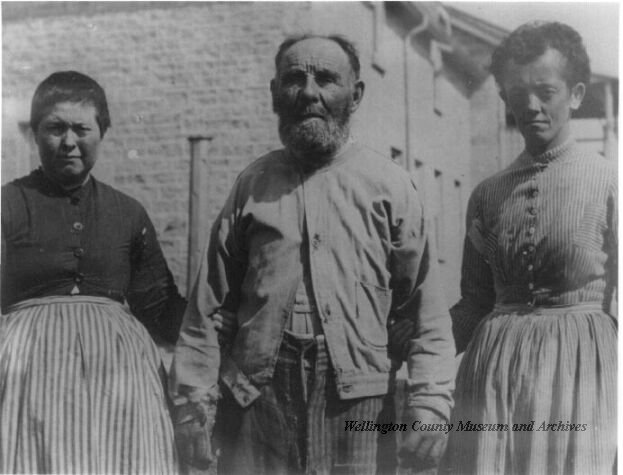
Three inmates of the House of Industry, circa 1900

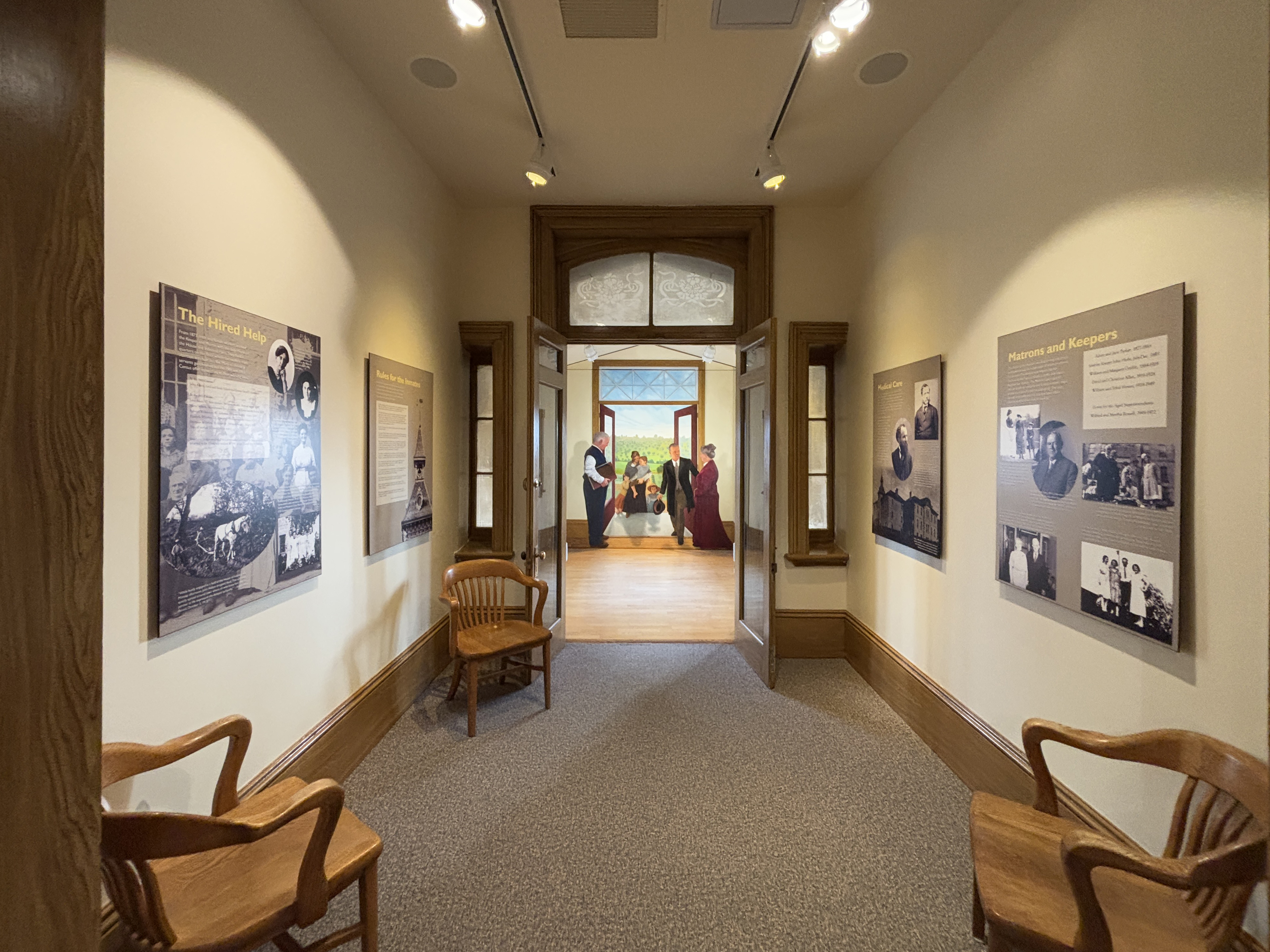
Level 1 foyer to display the environment in the past

The land for the House was purchased by the Wellington County Council in 1876. Of the 50 acre (20 ha) plot situated between the towns of Fergus and Elora, Ontario, 30 acres (12 ha) were dedicated to agricultural activities, where residents (then called inmates) would work to earn their keep. In 1886 and 1937, additional land was purchased, expanding the lot to its current size of 102 acres (41 ha).

The House of Industry was initially designed to accommodate 65 residents, offering admission to the "virtuous and respectable poor". Over a thousand people were admitted to the institution during its first 30 years of operation, predominantly older, working-class men who had previously been unskilled labourers. At the urging of the House's physician, Dr. Abraham Groves, a hospital wing was added in 1893 to accommodate increasing numbers of elderly and infirm inmates.

Accommodations at the poorhouse were spartan. Residents' rooms were furnished only with beds, nightstands and straight-back chairs. In 1877, the House was reported to spend less than 76 cents per week on the care of each inmate. Inmates were also bound to strict rules: they were forbidden from leaving the property without permission from the keeper of the house, and visitations were restricted to half a day, once per week. Married couples were not permitted to cohabit and were housed in separate wings of the building. The rural location of the House (common for Ontario houses of industry) served to further isolate inmates from their friends and family.

The House's goal of financing itself through agricultural production proved unsuccessful, as the inmates were largely elderly or in ill health; able-bodied young men were deemed unworthy of assistance. It became necessary to hire outside workers to maintain the house and farm. In 1889, the House's inspector remarked on the revenue produced by inmates' labour that "No estimate has been made and it would be very hard to furnish any that is reliable. Many do nothing and others do so little." It is estimated that in 1911, only 14% of the operational costs of the Ontario Houses of Refuge were covered by agricultural work.

The House of Industry operated as a poorhouse for seventy years from its 1877 opening until 1947, when it was renamed and repurposed as the Wellington County Home for the Aged. In 1955, a large addition was made to the rear of the building, providing additional accommodations for the home's residents. The Home for the Aged closed in 1971, and between 1987 and 1988 the main building was extensively renovated to convert it to the Wellington Museum and Archives. The museum now hosts exhibits pertaining to the House of Industry and local history.

In 1995, the Historic Sites and Monuments Board of Canada recognized the Wellington County House of Industry and Refuge as a National Historic Site. This designation was based on the House's demonstration of 19th century attitudes towards the poor, its role in the genesis of Canada's social welfare system, and the preservation of the site's original buildings and landscape.

== Architecture ==
=== Exterior ===
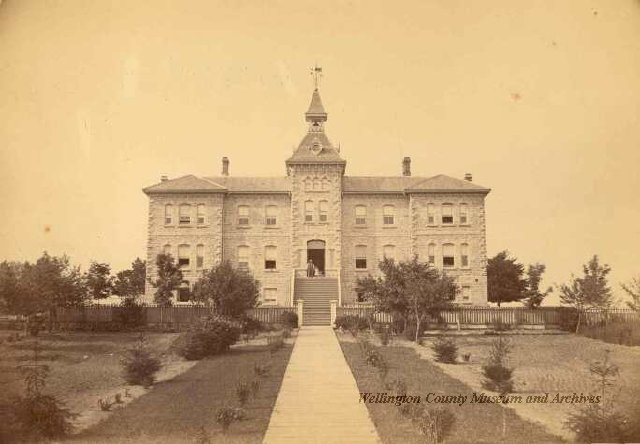
Exterior of the House of Industry, circa 1890

The main feature of the site is the residential building, a two-storey stone masonry building designed in an Italianate style by Guelph architect Victor Stewart in 1876. Stewart unexpectedly left town during the building's construction, leaving the completion of the project to local architect C. J. Soule. The building, completed in 1877, sits on a raised basement on a hilltop overlooking the Grand River. Its overall structure consists of five symmetrical pavilions with the entry and end pavilions projecting outwards, a design popular in contemporary public buildings of the British Empire. A belfry adorns the central pavilion, and the building's exterior is ornamented with an extensively bracketed cornice and segmental arches over the windows. The entry and end pavilions are emphasized with quoining, and stone sill courses separate the two stories. The roof is shallow with deep eaves, a design more decorative than practical for the Canadian climate.

Aside from the addition of a porch to the main entrance in 1907, the front and sides of the building remain as they were in 1877. A hospital wing, similar in design to the original building, was added to the east rear in 1893, and a further rear addition was built in 1955 to better accommodate residents during the site's use as an old age home. The back of the building, including the 1950s addition, has been largely obscured by a two-storey addition constructed during the 1980s conversion of the building to the Wellington Museum and Archives. This addition is identifiably modern in its design, with a concrete exterior.

A variety of agricultural buildings are located west of the house. Except for a hog pen and tool shed that was demolished in the 1970s, these 19th century buildings have been preserved. A timber-frame barn, constructed in 1877 by John Taylor from Elora, served as the centre of the poorhouse's agricultural activities, the lower level housing dairy cows while the upper level was used to store hay. The structure is supported by king-post trusses and lined with vertical sheathing board. A root cellar is located on the south end of the barn, and a silo was added to the barn's east end in 1914. A storage shed and driveshed dating to 1888 are located nearby.

A cemetery was established in 1888 on the east end of the poorhouse grounds. It remained in use until 1946, and 271 residents of the House were buried there, their graves marked with simple wooden crosses. A stone monument was erected on the cemetery grounds in 1951 and evergreen trees were planted. In 2013, the cemetery was restored by museum staff and officially opened to the public.

=== Interior ===
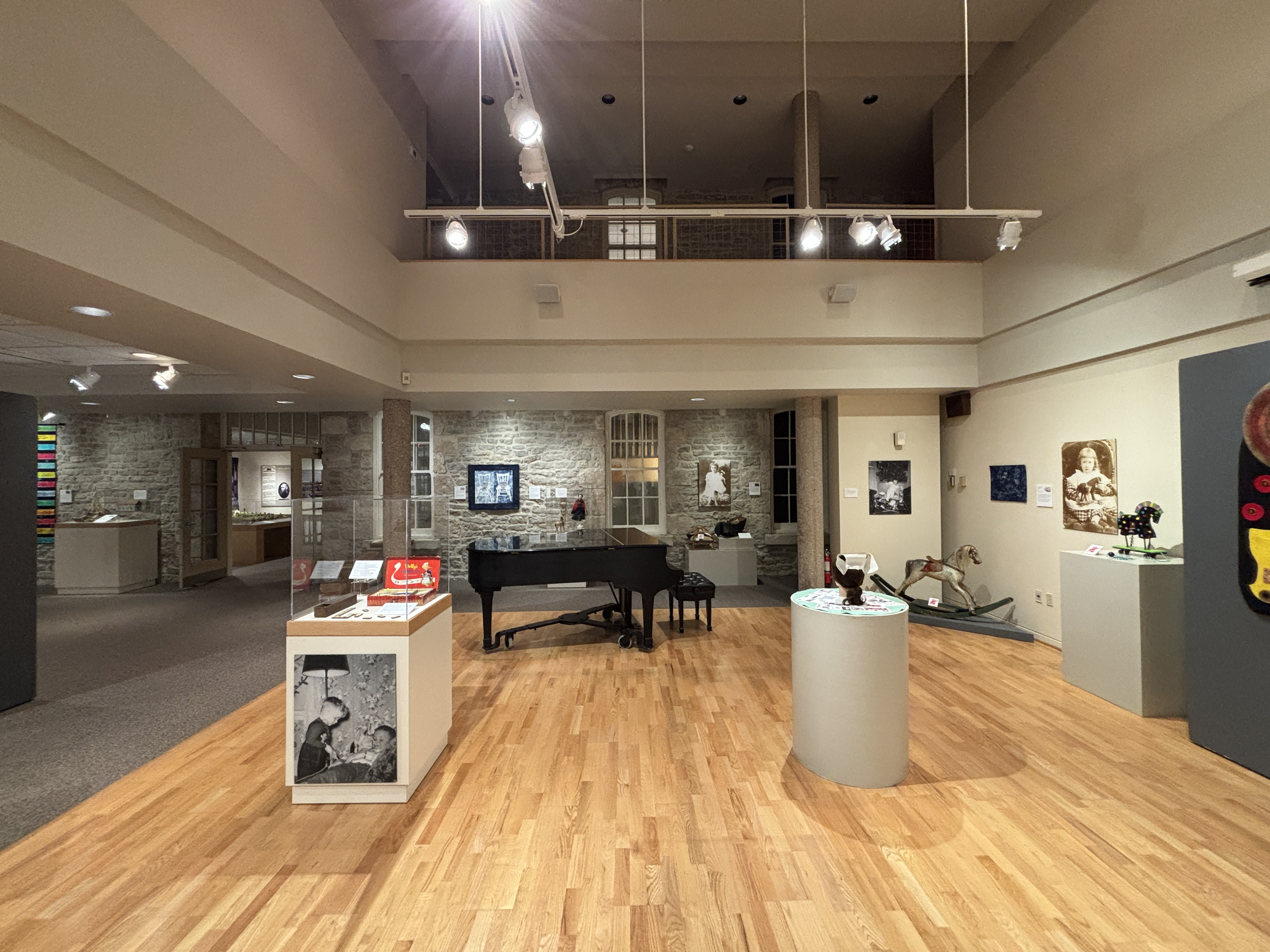
Level 1 exhibiton area

During the site's use as a poorhouse, the centre pavilion housed a well appointed, two-storey keeper's residence while separate wings for male and female inmates, laid out in dormitory style with sparse furnishings, were located on each side of the building. The building's basement housed kitchen and laundry services. The interior structure was preserved until the museum conversion, which involved the construction of a two-storey addition linking the main building to the hospital wing. This conversion required relocation of the main stairs in the central pavilion, removal of two stairwells in the side wings that did not conform to building codes, and removal of the doors separating the keeper's residence from the side wings.
